= Tommy Morrison vs. Donovan Ruddock =

Boxing match

Raw Power
- Date: June 10, 1995
- Venue: Municipal Auditorium in Kansas City, Missouri
- Title(s) on the line: IBC Heavyweight World Title

Tale of the tape
Boxer	Tommy Morrison	Donovan Ruddock
Nickname	The Duke	Razor
Hometown	Jay, Oklahoma, US	Toronto, Ontario, Canada
Purse	$50,000	$45,000
Pre-fight record	44–2–1 (38 KO)	28–4–1 (20 KO)
Age	26 years, 5 months	31 years, 5 months
Height	6 ft 2 in (188 cm)	6 ft 3 in (191 cm)
Weight	227 lb (103 kg)	244 lb (111 kg)
Style	Orthodox	Orthodox
Recognition	Former WBO heavyweight world champion	Former WBA Inter-Continental heavyweight champion

Result
- Morrison defeats Ruddock by TKO in round six

Tommy Morrison vs. Donovan Ruddock, billed as Raw Power, was a professional boxing match contested on June 10, 1995 for the IBC heavyweight world title.

== Background ==
In April 1995, a fight between former heavyweight contenders Tommy Morrison and Donovan "Razor" Ruddock was made official.

Both fighters had been top ranked heavyweights in the years prior and were looking to make a comeback after debilitating losses. Morrison was looking to bounce back into title contention after losing the WBO heavyweight world title in a first-round knockout loss to Michael Bentt in October 1993. Morrison would then go undefeated in 1994 with 3 wins and 1 draw and landed a WBO heavyweight world title fight against Herbie Hide on the infamous "High Noon in Hong Kong" card, but the event was cancelled at the last minute due to financial issues. With his world title opportunity falling by the wayside, Morrison would go 3–0 in 1995 before landing the fight with Ruddock.

Ruddock, meanwhile, was returning after a long period of inactivity. Ruddock was a top contender before suffering a blowout loss via second-round knockout to Lennox Lewis in October 1992. After said loss, Ruddock would take over a year off before returning with a unanimous decision victory in January 1994 against Anthony Wade, but he would not fight again until the Morrison fight. Ruddock had since fallen on hard times, filing for bankruptcy and then being involved in a lawsuit with his promoter and manager Murad Muhammad over an alleged forged contract, though the lawsuit was unsuccessful and Muhammad was able to continue as Ruddock's promoter.

== The fight ==
Despite his long layoff, Ruddock got off to a great start, dropping Morrison with an uppercut less than a minute into the first round, though Morrison got back up immediately and continued the fight. Morrison bounced back to take round two, stunning Ruddock with an uppercut of his own. Ruddock grabbed the top rope to prevent himself from going down, causing the referee to give him a standing eight count as a result. Both fighters continued to trade power punches in rounds three and four, but Ruddock took control in round five, hurting Morrison with several left hooks and keeping him at bay with his jab. Ruddock continued to control the early portion of round six, landing consecutive left hooks and causing a dazed Morrison to retreat. Ruddock pursued Morrison across the ring in effort to finish him off, but threw a wild uppercut that missed Morrison, who in turn countered with this trademark left hook, which sent Ruddock down in a heap. Ruddock got back up and was allowed to continue the fight, though Morrison quickly rushed in with a barrage of unanswered punches that caused the referee to step in and give Ruddock another standing eight count. Ruddock attempted to clinch Morrison in an effort to survive the final 30 seconds, but Morrison landed another unanswered barrage that led the referee to step in and stop the fight, giving Morrison the victory by TKO and the IBC heavyweight world title.

== Fight card ==
Confirmed bouts:

Weight Class	Weight		vs.		Method	Round	Notes
Heavyweight	200+ lb	Tommy Morrison	def.	Donovan Ruddock	TKO	6/12
Lightweight	135 lb	Orlando Canizales	def.	Kino Rodriguez	KO	2/10
Super Middleweight	168 lb	Roberto Durán	def	Roni Martinez	TKO	7/10
Heavyweight	200+ lb	Alonzo Highsmith	def	Jeff Garrigan	KO	3/4

Preceded by vs. Terry Anderson	Tommy Morrison's bouts June 10, 1995	Succeeded by vs. Lennox Lewis
Preceded by vs. Anthony Wade	Donovan Ruddock's bouts June 10, 1995	Succeeded by vs. Brian Yates
