= One Big Night =

Boxing event

- Date: May 10, 1996
- Venue: Madison Square Garden, New York City, New York, U.S.

One Big Night was a professional boxing card contested at Madison Square Garden on May 10, 1996.

Promoted by Main Events and broadcast by HBO, the card featured three televised non-title heavyweight bouts; Tim Witherspoon vs. Jorge Luis González, Lennox Lewis vs. Ray Mercer and Evander Holyfield vs. Bobby Czyz.

== Background ==
The event's origins date back to November 1995 when it was announced that Madison Square Garden would produce an all-heavyweight fight card in honor of the 25th anniversary of Fight of the Century, the heavyweight title fight between Joe Frazier and Muhammad Ali which had taken place at the venue in 1971. Originally, the card, promoted by Bob Arum and dubbed End of an Era, was set to be headlined by a George Foreman–Michael Moorer heavyweight title fight, a long-awaited rematch of their 1994 fight two years prior that was to be Foreman's final fight. Supplementing the Foreman–Moorer bout was an undercard that was tentatively scheduled to feature Jeremy Williams facing either Ray Mercer or James Toney, Peter McNeeley, coming off his infamous fight against Mike Tyson, against undefeated knockout sensation Eric "Butterbean" Esch and young up-and-coming heavyweights Michael Grant and Jo el Scott against yet-to-be-named opponents.

The original event, initially set for February 29, 1996, was derailed after a dispute between Arum and Time Warner, the then-parent company of HBO, regarding a series of conditions Time Warner insisted on Arum meeting before they agreed to broadcast the event on pay-per-view. After the cancellation, Madison Square Garden senior vice president John Cirillo, determined to still put on a heavyweight boxing event, recruited promoter Dino Duva of Main Events, who began negotiations with former heavyweight champions Lennox Lewis and Evander Holyfield to face Ray Mercer and Lou Savarese respectively. In early February, Lewis agreed to face Mercer, followed by Holyfield, who was matched up against two-division world champion Bobby Czyz instead of Savarese. 38-year old former two-time heavyweight champion Tim Witherspoon, who had defeated Al Cole at Madison Square Garden earlier in January of that year but suffered a broken left hand in the process, recovered from his injury enough and was matched up against Jorge Luis González to round out the card. The Holyfield–Czyz fight went on last as the main event on account of the five-hour time difference in Lewis' native England, which was broadcasting the fight on Sky Sports, which led to his fight going on second.

Though HBO and Madison Square Garden still hoped to honor the 25th anniversary of Frazier–Ali I, both men declined to appear after being unable to come to an agreement financially, thus the planned celebration was dropped from the event.

== Witherspoon vs. González ==
One Big Night: Witherspoon vs. González
Tale of the tape
Boxer	Tim Witherspoon	Jorge Luis González
Nickname	Terrible	
Hometown	Philadelphia, Pennsylvania, U.S.	Havana, Cuba
Pre-fight record	44–4 (29 KO)	24–1 (23 KO)
Age	38 years, 4 months	31 years, 6 months
Height	6 ft 3 1/2 in (192 cm)	6 ft 7 in (201 cm)
Weight	224 lb (102 kg)	250 lb (113 kg)
Style	Orthodox	Orthodox
Recognition	Former two-time heavyweight champion	

Result
- Witherspoon wins via fifth-round technical knockout

The first bout of the televised broadcast saw former two-time heavyweight champion Tim Witherspoon against former heavyweight contender Jorge Luis González, who was nearly one year removed from his WBO heavyweight title fight against Riddick Bowe. Witherspoon had suffered a broken hand in his previous fight, also at Madison Square Garden, against Al Cole in January, leaving his status uncertain for the One Big Night card, though the injury had healed enough for him to commit to face González.

Witherspoon controlled the fight and ended it during the final minute of the fifth round. Witherspoon caught González against the ropes and landed a series of right and left hooks to the head of González. Stunned, González tried to clinch Witherspoon, but failed and was hit cleanly with more hooks that eventually sent him down. Referee Joe Santarpia counted until seven, but after realizing González was in no condition to continue, stopped the fight with five seconds remaining in the round, giving Witherspoon the victory by technical knockout.

After the event, Witherspoon was critical of the performances of his fellow former heavyweight champions, Lewis and Holyfield, stating to the New York Times "If that's all they have to offer, then I'm the best out there."

== Lewis vs. Mercer ==
One Big Night: Lewis vs. Mercer
Tale of the tape
Boxer	Lennox Lewis	Ray Mercer
Nickname	The Lion	Merciless
Hometown	London, England	Union City, New Jersey, U.S.
Pre-fight record	28–1 (24 KO)	23–3–1 (16 KO)
Age	30 years, 8 months	35 years, 1 month
Height	6 ft 5 in (196 cm)	6 ft 1 in (185 cm)
Weight	247 lb (112 kg)	238 lb (108 kg)
Style	Orthodox	Orthodox
Recognition	WBC; No. 1 Ranked Heavyweight; WBA; No. 3 Ranked Heavyweight; IBF; No. 5 Ranked Heavyweight	Former WBO heavyweight titleholder

Result
- Lewis wins via majority decision (96–94, 96–95, 95–95)

=== Background ===
Lewis was the WBC's number-one ranked heavyweight and the mandatory challenger to WBC heavyweight champion Frank Bruno after defeating Lionel Butler in an eliminator bout in May 1995. However, the WBC bypassed Lewis and sanctioned a fight between Bruno and the recently returned former undisputed heavyweight champion Mike Tyson to take place on March 16, 1996. Lewis sued the WBC in hopes of stopping the Bruno–Tyson fight and getting the title fight against Bruno himself. With the lawsuit not being settled until after the Bruno–Tyson fight, Lewis took the fight with Mercer in the meantime.

Lewis' previous fight had taken place on October 7, 1995, against Tommy Morrison, who had since been diagnosed with HIV in February 1996. As a safety precaution, Lewis, who had been vacationing in Jamaica, was flown in to London in order to be tested for the disease, with the results coming back negative.

=== Fight details ===
Though Lewis entered the fight as the clear-cut favorite, Mercer surprised both Lewis and the audience by putting on one of the best performances of his career. From the opening bell, the two men would go back and forth, with Mercer being able to win two of the first three rounds on the scorecards. The two men would have arguably their most entertaining showing in the fourth. Lewis was able to hit Mercer with two impressive combinations within the round's first two minutes, but with 40 seconds left in the round, Mercer was able to put on his best offensive showing in the fight as he hammered Lewis with a 16-punch combination that briefly stunned Lewis. Lewis then responded with a combination of his own, but Mercer was able to fight out of it with another combination. The two continued to exchange close rounds with neither man gaining a knockdown and, by the end of the fight, both fighters' eyes were almost completely shut. One judge scored the fight a draw at 95–95, while the other two judges had Lewis narrowly winning the fight with scores of 96–95 and 96–94, giving Lewis the victory by majority decision.

When the decision was announced by Michael Buffer, the pro-Mercer crowd loudly booed, having felt Mercer had done enough to win the fight. The unofficial Associated Press scorecard had Mercer clearly winning the fight by the score of 97–93, while HBO's unofficial ringside scorer Harold Lederman scored the bout a draw 95–95. Despite giving up three inches to Lewis, Mercer was able to land 60% percent of his jabs to Lewis' 33%. Mercer also landed a higher percentage of total punches, 59% to Lewis' 44%. Lewis, however, was able to narrowly land more total punches, having landed 235 punches to Mercer's 223.

== Holyfield vs. Czyz ==
One Big Night: Holyfield vs. Czyz
Tale of the tape
Boxer	Evander Holyfield	Bobby Czyz
Nickname	The Real Deal	The Matinee Idol
Hometown	Atlanta, Georgia, U.S.	Wanaque, New Jersey, U.S.
Pre-fight record	31–3 (22 KO)	44–6 (28 KO)
Age	33 years, 6 months	34 years, 3 months
Height	6 ft 2 1/2 in (189 cm)	5 ft 10 in (178 cm)
Weight	211 lb (96 kg)	210 lb (95 kg)
Style	Orthodox	Orthodox
Recognition	WBC; No. 8 Ranked Heavyweight; Former 2-division undisputed world champion	Former 2-division world champion

Result
- Holyfield wins via 5th-round corner retirement

In the main event of the evening, Holyfield dominated the bout, controlling the action from the opening bell and using his height and strength advantages to force Czyz to take a standing 8-count in the 3rd round. Referee Ron Lipton stopped the contest two rounds later, declaring Holyfield the winner by a technical knockout after Czyz quit on his stool following the 5th round.

Prior to the stoppage, Czyz had complained of a foreign substance in his eyes and claimed that someone in Holyfield's corner had put a substance on his gloves to cause burning.

In response to Czyz's accusations, Lipton rubbed Holyfield's gloves on his own face to no effect, and determined that nothing had come off the gloves. State investigators later examined the gloves after the fight but found no foreign substances other than the standard petroleum jelly.

In the days after the bout, tapes from the HBO telecast revealed that Czyz had told his corner that he could not continue due to pain in his back, only for his trainer Tommy Parks to insist "Don't say it's your back. I said it's your eyes." When Czyz attempted to interject, Parks was heard saying "You shut up. Let me handle this. If I say it's your eyes, that's what it is."

Several months later, on November 9th, 1996, Holyfield faced and defeated WBA Champion Mike Tyson by 11th round TKO in a massive upset, tying Muhammad Ali as being the only two men to hold the heavyweight title on three separate occasions.

== Fight card ==
Confirmed bouts:

Weight Class	Weight		vs.		Method	Round
Heavyweight	200+ lbs.	Evander Holyfield	def.	Bobby Czyz	RTD	5/10
Heavyweight	200+ lbs.	Lennox Lewis	def.	Ray Mercer	MD	10
Heavyweight	200+ lbs.	Tim Witherspoon	def.	Jorge Luis González	TKO	5/10
Light Heavyweight	175 lbs.	Montell Griffin	def.	Charles Scott	TKO	4/10
Welterweight	147 lbs.	Vernon Forrest	def.	Chris Slaughter	TKO	1/10
Heavyweight	200+ lbs.	Courage Tshabalala	def.	Tim Noble	SD	8
Heavyweight	200+ lbs.	Gary Bell	def.	Patrick Freeman	UD	6
Heavyweight	200+ lbs.	Michael Grant	def.	Olian Alexander	TKO	4/4

== Broadcasting ==
Country	Broadcaster
United Kingdom	Sky Sports
United States	HBO

Preceded by vs. Al Cole	Tim Witherspoon's bouts May 10, 1996	Succeeded by vs. Ray Mercer
Preceded by vs. Jason Waller	Jorge Luis González's bouts May 10, 1996	Succeeded by vs. Ross Puritty
Preceded by vs. Tommy Morrison	Lennox Lewis's bouts May 10, 1996	Succeeded by vs. Oliver McCall II
Preceded by vs. Evander Holyfield	Ray Mercer's bouts May 10, 1996	Succeeded by vs. Tim Witherspoon
Preceded by vs. Riddick Bowe III	Evander Holyfield's bouts May 10, 1996	Succeeded by vs. Mike Tyson
Preceded by vs. Richard Jackson	Bobby Czyz's bouts May 10, 1996	Succeeded by vs. Corrie Sanders
