= Michael Bentt vs. Herbie Hide =

Professional boxing match in 1994

- Date: 19 March 1994
- Venue: The New Den, Southwark, London, UK
- Title on the line: WBO heavyweight title

Tale of the tape
Boxer	Michael Bentt	Herbie Hide
Nickname		The Dancing Destroyer
Hometown	Brooklyn, New York, U.S.	Norwich, England, UK
Purse	$1,100,000	
Pre-fight record	11–1 (6 KO)	25–0 (24 KO)
Age	28 years, 6 months	22 years, 6 months
Height	6 ft 3 in (191 cm)	6 ft 2 in (188 cm)
Weight	230 lb (104 kg)	216 lb (98 kg)
Style	Orthodox	Orthodox
Recognition	WBO; Heavyweight Champion; The Ring; No. 5 Ranked Heavyweight	WBA; No. 5 Ranked Heavyweight; IBF; No. 7 Ranked Heavyweight; British heavyweight champion

Result
- Hide wins via 7th-round KO

Michael Bentt vs. Herbie Hide was a professional boxing match contested on 19 March 1994, for the WBO heavyweight title.

== Background ==
Bentt, in only his 12th professional fight and virtually unknown, scored an upset first-round knockout victory over the heavily favored Tommy Morrison, making him the new WBO heavyweight champion in the process. Bentt's first defence was announced to take place in London. Bentt who had been born in London but raised in New York City championed his British heritage exclaiming to be as British as "Bruno, Lewis or Thatcher." Bentt and his team narrowed his potential opponents to British fighters Lennox Lewis and Herbie Hide, with Bentt also receiving a big money offer to face George Foreman. While Bentt stated he preferred Foreman or Lewis, he was unable to reach an agreement with either fighter and Hide was ultimately picked as his opponent.

A memorable altercation occurred two months before the fight. On 10 January 1994, Bentt and Hide were at a press conference at the Sheraton Park Tower Hotel in London to promote the fight. Hide, who had taken exception to Bentt calling himself British, caused an uproar when he knocked a baseball cap off Bentt's head, leading to Bentt to retaliate by throwing a punch that sent Hide down. Hide and Bentt then wrestled each other in a puddle before they were broken up. Hide complained to the media afterward "It goes to show what hooligans we have in boxing. He's a nut. He can't take criticism. He hit me for no reason at all." Said Bentt about the incident "He compromised my manhood. No man is going to lay his hands on me. I don't regret it. I'm a man first and a boxer second. Nobody attempts to belittle me." Two days later, Bentt had a change of heart and apologized for his role in the brawl stating "I want to apologize this morning to all the people of Britain. I let boxing down. I let myself down. I let my faith down because of my behaviour with Herbie Hide. "All I remember is him coming at me. He pulled my Millwall cap off, but I thought he was about to attack me. That's why I hit out. There was no malice, there was nothing personal about it at all." Because of the brawl, both Bentt and Hide were fined $14,800 by the British Boxing Board of Control.

== The fight ==
Bentt and Hide fought a close first two rounds with Hide winning the first on the scorecards and Bentt winning the second. However, the fight turned in Hide's favour in the third round when he landed a massive left hook that hurt Bentt and then sent him down to canvas with an uppercut. Bentt barely survived the round, answering the referee's count at nine and then withstood a furious rally from Hide thereafter. From then on, Hide dominated the fight as a shaky Bentt struggled to offensively and defensively. Finally, with 10 seconds left in the seventh round, Hide sent Bentt down face first after landing a left-right combination. Bentt did not attempt to get back until the referee was at the end his 10-count and was counted out, giving Hide the knockout victory.

== Aftermath ==
Bentt, who complained of dizziness after the fight, collapsed in his dressing room shortly after the fight ended and had to be rushed to the hospital. After undergoing a CT scan, it was determined that Bentt was suffering from swelling of the brain and it was also revealed that Bentt had no memory of the fight itself nor any event in the proceeding six hours prior. John Sutcliffe, the neurosurgeon who examined Bentt, determined that Bentt's injuries were serious enough to be career-ending telling the media "Having suffered an injury similar to this some weeks ago, I think he is now suffering the effects of more than one injury over the past few months or possibly years. I think it would be unwise for him to box more." After spending two days in the hospital, Bentt was released and was scheduled to return to New York City that same day before setting up an appointment with another neurosurgeon. While on the flight home, Bentt collapsed again, though his manager said that this was likely due to low blood sugar (Hypoglycemia) rather than as a result of his neurological injuries and they were able to revive him after giving him juice and feeding him. Bentt would ultimately never fight again and transitioned to acting.

== Undercard ==
Confirmed bouts:

Weight Class	Weight		vs.		Method	Round	Notes
Heavyweight	200+ lbs.	Herbie Hide	def	Michael Bentt (c)	KO	7/12	^{Note 1}
Cruiserweight	190 lbs.	Gary Ballard	def.	Ian Henry	TKO	4/8
Bantamweight	110 lbs.	Wayne McCullough	def.	Mark Hargreaves	TKO	3/6
Light Heavyweight	175 lbs.	Mark Delaney	def.	Paul Murray	KO	3/6

^Note 1 For WBO heavyweight title

== Broadcasting ==
Country	Broadcaster
United Kingdom	Sky Sports
United States	ESPN

Preceded by vs. Tommy Morrison	Michael Bentt's bouts 19 March 1994	Retired
Preceded by vs. Jeff Lampkin	Herbie Hide's bouts 19 March 1994	Succeeded by ~~vs. Tommy Morrison~~ vs. Riddick Bowe
