= Lennox Lewis vs. Tommy Morrison =

Boxing competition

Laying It All On the Line
- Date: October 7, 1995
- Venue: Convention Center, Atlantic City, New Jersey, U.S.
- Title(s) on the line: IBC Heavyweight Championship

Tale of the tape
| Boxer | Lennox Lewis | Tommy Morrison |
| Nickname | The Lion | The Duke |
| Hometown | London, England | Jay, Oklahoma, U.S. |
| Purse | $2,400,000 | $2,100,000 |
| Pre-fight record | 27–1 (23 KO) | 45–2–1 (39 KO) |
| Age | 30 years, 1 month | 26 years, 9 months |
| Height | 6 ft 5 in (196 cm) | 6 ft 2 in (188 cm) |
| Weight | 241 lb (109 kg) | 227 lb (103 kg) |
| Style | Orthodox | Orthodox |
| Recognition | WBC; No. 2 Ranked Heavyweight; WBA; No. 5 Ranked Heavyweight; IBF; No. 8 Ranked Heavyweight; The Ring; No. 6 Ranked Heavyweight; Former WBC heavyweight champion | The Ring; No. 10 Ranked Heavyweight; IBC; Heavyweight Champion |

Result
- Lewis wins via 6th round technical knockout

Lennox Lewis vs. Tommy Morrison, billed as Laying It All on the Line, was a professional boxing match contested on October 7, 1995, for the IBC heavyweight championship.

== Background ==
A Lennox Lewis–Tommy Morrison fight had been in the making for two years. During Lewis' first reign as WBC Heavyweight Champion, he and Morrison, who was fresh off a victory over George Foreman that made him the WBO Heavyweight Champion, were able to reach an agreement that would see Lewis make the fourth defense of his title against Morrison, with both men evenly splitting a $16 million purse. However, the bout was cancelled after Morrison lost to the virtually unknown Michael Bentt. Bentt brutalized Morrison in the first round of their WBO Championship fight, gaining three knockdowns on Morrison en route to a first-round knockout victory. Lewis, meanwhile, made his next defense against fringe-contender Phil Jackson instead, eventually winning by knockout in the eighth round. Lewis then moved on the face the WBC's number one contender Oliver McCall, but in one of boxing's biggest upsets, McCall earned the upset victory by knocking Lewis out in the second round with a quick right hand. Lewis attempted to quickly gain a rematch with McCall, offering the champion a $10 million payday, but McCall refused the offer. As such, Lewis was forced to look elsewhere and met the WBC's number two contender Lionel "The Train" Butler in the first match of his comeback, easily picking up the victory with a fifth-round knockout. After facing a bevy of unknowns and fighting to a draw with journeyman Ross Puritty, Morrison was able to get back in contention with a knockout victory over fellow heavyweight contender Donovan "Razor" Ruddock. Following this, Morrison was scheduled to meet former Undisputed Heavyweight Champion Riddick Bowe for Bowe's WBO Heavyweight title, but Bowe pulled out after obtaining a more lucrative fight with Evander Holyfield. Shortly after the cancellation of the Bowe–Morrison fight, Lewis and Morrison were able to reach an agreement to face one another, which would see Morrison's newly captured IBC belt at stake, during the fall of 1995 in Atlantic City, New Jersey.

== The fight ==
Both fighters fought a conservative first round with neither man establishing much power-wise, but Lewis was able to effectively and efficiently use his signature left-jab to keep Morrison on the defensive and had little trouble with Morrison from the second round onwards. Lewis continued to use that strategy in the second, but as the second minute of the round came to a close, Morrison attacked Lewis with a combination to the body that he followed up with a strong right hand. Lewis was able to dodge Morrison's attempt and countered with a quick left hook that caused Morrison to briefly fall on one knee, causing referee Mills Lane to rule it a knockdown after which Morrison had to take a mandatory standing eight count. The punch also opened a cut above Morrison's right eye that would hinder him for the rest of the fight. Lewis continued to effectively use his left hand in round three, outboxing Morrison to win his third consecutive round. Morrison rebounded with a strong fourth round, winning the round on two of the judge's scorecards. Lewis, however, regained control of the fight in the fifth and was able to gain a second knockdown of Morrison towards the end of the round with a right uppercut that again caused Morrison to fall on one knee. Morrison was able to answer the referee's count and hung on to survive the remainder of the round. Though his right eye was now almost completely shut and he was now well behind Lewis on the scorecards due to the two knockdowns, Morrison and his corner decided to continue on with fight, hoping that Morrison could finally surprise Lewis with his dangerous left hook and possibly score a knockout victory like he had in his previous fight against Ruddock. Lewis, however, continued to dominate the exhausted Morrison and dropped Morrison to the canvas for the third time 50 seconds into the round. Morrison again answered the referee's count, but Lewis continued his assault and was able to score the deciding knockdown around 30 seconds later with a strong left hook. Lane gave Morrison another standing eight count, but as Morrison was clearly in no condition to continue, decided to stop the fight and Lewis was rewarded with the third consecutive technical knockout victory of his comeback.

== Aftermath ==
In February 1996 Morrison was tested positive for HIV by Nevada Athletic Commission which ended his career at the elite level of boxing, with his final professional fight in the 1990s, to raise funds for the Knockout AIDS Foundation, a TKO victory against Marcus Rhode in November 1996.

Lewis would go on to face another former WBO beltholder in Ray Mercer who he beat by a razor thin majority decision, before signing to finally face long time rival Riddick Bowe in a non-title fight due to be held in September 1996.

== Undercard ==
Confirmed bouts:

== Broadcasting ==
| Country | Broadcaster |
|---|---|
| Mexico | Televisa |
| United Kingdom | Sky Sports |
| United States | HBO |

| Preceded by vs. Justin Fortune | Lennox Lewis's bouts October 7, 1995 | Succeeded by vs. Ray Mercer |
| Preceded by vs. Donovan Ruddock | Tommy Morrison's bouts October 7, 1995 | Succeeded by vs. Marcus Rhode |
