= Ray Mercer vs. Tommy Morrison =

Boxing match

Test of Courage
- Date: October 18, 1991
- Venue: Convention Center, Atlantic City, New Jersey, U.S.
- Title on the line: WBO Heavyweight Championship

Tale of the tape
| Boxer | Ray Mercer | Tommy Morrison |
| Nickname | Merciless | The Duke |
| Hometown | Union City, New Jersey, U.S. | Jay, Oklahoma, U.S. |
| Purse | $550,000 | $500,000 |
| Pre-fight record | 17–0 (12 KO) | 28–0 (24 KO) |
| Age | 30 years, 6 months | 22 years, 9 months |
| Height | 6 ft 1 in (185 cm) | 6 ft 2 in (188 cm) |
| Weight | 225 lb (102 kg) | 221 3/4 lb (101 kg) |
| Style | Orthodox | Orthodox |
| Recognition | WBO; Heavyweight Champion; The Ring; No. 6 Ranked Heavyweight | WBA/WBO; No. 8 Ranked Heavyweight; WBC; No. 11 Ranked Heavyweight; IBF; No. 12 Ranked Heavyweight |

Result
- Mercer defeated Morrison by 5th round knockout

Ray Mercer vs. Tommy Morrison, billed as Test of Courage, was a professional boxing match contested on October 18, 1991 for the WBO heavyweight world championship.

== Background ==
The fight was a matchup between two undefeated, up-and-coming heavyweights. Thirty-year-old 1988 Olympic Gold Medalist Ray Mercer had won all 17 of his previous fights (12 by KO) since turning pro in 1989 and was coming off a victory over Francesco Damiani that made him the WBO Heavyweight Champion, though the WBO title did not carry nearly as much prestige as the WBA, WBC and IBF versions of the title. Meanwhile, 22-year-old Tommy Morrison was a perfect 28–0 with 23 victories coming by way of knockout. Morrison had four prior fights in 1991 including first round victories over former heavyweight contenders James Tillis and Pinklon Thomas. Initially, the bout was set to take place on August 9, but Morrison had to withdraw after suffering a deep cut while sparring. Mercer contemplated facing a substitute opponent, but it was announced the following week that fight would be rescheduled for October 18.

While Mercer was fighting and winning with injuries and under adversity against Kimmuel Odum, Bert Cooper and Francesco Damiani, critics have called his skills primitive. Rumors circulated that Ray was more dedicated to partying than to training.

== The Fight ==
Morrison got off to a great start, outboxing a sluggish Mercer through the first three rounds en route to taking all three rounds on all three of the judge's scorecards. Morrison was able to limit Mercer's offense, landed several combinations and opened up a cut on Mercer's lower lip. However, Mercer rebounded with a strong round four, landing several hard rights to Morrison's head. Mercer would end the fight only 28 seconds into the fifth round. With Morrison backed up into the corner, Mercer was able to land a 15–punch combination. Clearly hurt from the exchange, Morrison slumped unconscious against the ropes, but the referee allowed Mercer to land several more punishing blows to a now defenseless Morrison before finally ending the fight.

== Aftermath ==
Mercer's victory propelled into one of the top heavyweights in the division and he made it known in his post-match interview that he wanted a shot at Evander Holyfield's Undisputed Heavyweight title. Mercer chose to bypass a WBO title match with Michael Moorer, instead vacating the title in order to move on to a number one contenders match with Larry Holmes scheduled on February 7, 1992 with a shot at Holyfield's Undisputed title on the line. Mercer was installed as a heavy favorite over the aging Holmes, but Holmes was able to outbox and outpoint Mercer en route to a unanimous decision victory, taking Mercer's title shot against Holyfield in the process.

Morrison rebounded from the loss by winning his next eight fights before meeting George Foreman for the WBO heavyweight world championship in June 1993, which had been vacated by Moorer earlier in the year. Morrison was able to outbox Foreman and won by a lopsided unanimous decision to become the new WBO champion, as well as reestablishing him as one of the top heavyweight contenders. After defending his title once against Tim Tomashek, Morrison signed a deal to meet the WBC heavyweight world champion Lennox Lewis for the title, but chose to take a tuneup bout against the virtually unknown Michael Bentt before facing Lewis. The decision would prove to be unwise as Bentt brutalized Morrison during their fight, knocking him down three times in the first round after which the fight was stopped and Bentt was named the winner. The loss cost Morrison his title shot against Lewis, as well as a reported $7.5 million that he was to earn in the Lewis fight.

== Undercard ==
Confirmed bouts:

== Broadcasting ==
| Country | Broadcaster |
|---|---|
| United States | HBO |

| Preceded by vs. Francesco Damiani | Ray Mercer's bouts October 18 1991 | Succeeded by vs. Larry Holmes |
| Preceded by vs. Ladislao Mijangos | Tommy Morrison's bouts October 18 1991 | Succeeded by vs. Bobby Quarry |
