= George Foreman vs. Tommy Morrison =

Boxing competition

Star-Spangled Battle
- Date: June 7, 1993
- Venue: Thomas & Mack Center, Paradise, Nevada
- Title(s) on the line: WBO Heavyweight Championship

Tale of the tape
Boxer	George Foreman	Tommy Morrison
Nickname	Big	The Duke
Hometown	Houston, Texas	Jay, Oklahoma
Purse	$7,000,000	$1,250,000
Pre-fight record	72–3 (67 KO)	36–1 (32 KO)
Age	44 years, 4 months	24 years, 5 months
Height	6 ft 4 in (193 cm)	6 ft 2 in (188 cm)
Weight	256 lb (116 kg)	226 lb (103 kg)
Style	Orthodox	Orthodox
Recognition	IBF/WBO; No. 1 Ranked Heavyweight; WBA; No. 4 Ranked Heavyweight; The Ring; No. 5 Ranked Heavyweight; Former undisputed heavyweight champion	WBO; No. 2 Ranked Heavyweight; WBA/IBF; No. 7 Ranked Heavyweight; The Ring; No. 6 Ranked Heavyweight

Result
- Morrison defeated Foreman by 12th round unanimous decision

George Foreman vs. Tommy Morrison, billed as the Star-Spangled Battle, was a professional boxing match contested between George Foreman and Tommy Morrison on June 7, 1993, for the vacant World Boxing Organization (WBO) Heavyweight Championship.

== Background ==
After WBO Heavyweight champion Michael Moorer opted to vacate the title in February 1993, the WBO sanctioned a match between popular 44-year-old ex-WBC and WBA heavyweight champion George Foreman and then up-and-coming 24-year-old prospect Tommy Morrison to determine who would be the next WBO Heavyweight champion. Both fighters were looking to claim the title after losing their previous heavyweight title fights. Foreman had come up short to Evander Holyfield in a bid to become the oldest Undisputed Heavyweight champion two years prior, while Morrison had unsuccessfully challenged fellow undefeated contender Ray Mercer for the WBO title, in what was his first (and at the time of his fight with Foreman, only) professional loss. Prior to the fight, Foreman announced that his fight with Morrison would "probably (be) the last fight I'll ever have" while adding that he wanted to go out "right" by getting a "title belt around my waist". Foreman was a 7-to-5 favorite to win.

== The Fight ==
Though the bout was promoted as a match between two of boxing's hardest punchers, neither fighter scored a knockdown nor had his opponent in any real danger. Morrison abandoned his usual aggressive style while Foreman was the aggressor for the duration of the fight, stalking the agile Morrison, who in turn circled the older and bigger Foreman, scoring with sharp punches before quickly retreating. Though the pro-Foreman fans voiced their disapproval by showering Morrison with boos, Morrison's tactic ultimately paid off. Morrison won the bout in a lopsided unanimous decision with two scores of 117–110 and one score of 118–109, becoming the new WBO Heavyweight champion in the process. Unofficial HBO scorer Harold Lederman had 116–111 in Morrison's favor.

== Aftermath ==
Morrison's victory not only made him the WBO heavyweight champion, but also a legitimate contender to the three major heavyweight titles sanctioned by the WBA, WBC and IBF. His rise and reign, projected to last for a few years at least, lasted for only 144 days. Morrison first agreed to defend his newly won title against his Rocky V co-star Michael Williams in what was billed as real-life Tommy Gunn vs. Union Cane (the characters that Morrison and Williams played in the film) matchup. However, Williams refused to leave his dressing room and Morrison was forced to face unknown journeyman Tim Tomashek, winning the bout after four rounds when Tomashek's corner refused to let him continue. Morrison then agreed to a lucrative WBC title shot against champion Lennox Lewis, but opted to defend his WBO title against little-known Michael Bentt in what was perceived to be a warmup before facing Lewis. However, Bentt would unexpectedly score three knockdowns over Morrison en route to a first-round knockout victory that cost Morrison his title match against Lewis.

Foreman initially stuck with his retirement plans and spent a year and a half without participating in a boxing match. However, Foreman decided to challenge the newly crowned WBA and IBF heavyweight champion Michael Moorer for his titles to which Moorer accepted. Moorer appeared to have the fight in hand and was ahead on all three scorecards when Foreman hit him with a sudden right hand in the 10th round that dropped Moorer for the count and made Foreman the oldest heavyweight champion in boxing history.

== Undercard ==
Confirmed bouts:

== Broadcasting ==
Country	Broadcaster
Canada	TSN
France	Canal+
Mexico	Televisa
Philippines	GMA Network
United Kingdom	Sky Sports
United States	HBO

Preceded by vs. Pierre Coetzer	George Foreman's bouts June 7 1993	Succeeded by vs. Michael Moorer
Preceded by vs. Dan Murphy	Tommy Morrison's bouts June 7 1993	Succeeded by vs. Tim Tomashek
