= Quarry brothers =

The Quarry brothers were four sibling American boxers of the 20th century:

- James Quarry (1944-2002), eldest brother of Jerry and Mike Quarry american heavyweight boxer
- Jerry Quarry (1945–1999), American heavyweight boxer
- Mike Quarry (1951–2006), light heavyweight boxer
- Bobby Quarry (born 1962), youngest brother of Jerry and Mike Quarry
