= Joe Hipp =

American boxer

- Born: December 7, 1962 (age 63); Browning, Montana, U.S.
- Other names: The Boss
- Nationality: American Blackfeet Nation
- Height: 1.85 m (6 ft 1 in)
- Weight: 105.0 kg (231.5 lb; 16.53 st)
- Division: Heavyweight
- Reach: 73 in (185 cm)
- Stance: Southpaw
- Years active: 18 (1987–2005)

Professional boxing record
- Total: 50
- Wins: 43
- By knockout: 29
- Losses: 7
- By knockout: 6

Amateur boxing record
- Total: 128
- Wins: 119
- Losses: 9

Other information
- Occupation: All Nations Foundation, founder
- Notable school: A.C. Davis High School
- Boxing record from BoxRec
- Last updated on: October 17, 2009

Joe "the Boss" Hipp (born December 7, 1962) is an American former professional boxer who competed from 1987 to 2005. A member of the Blackfeet Tribe, he became the first Native American to challenge for a world heavyweight boxing championship on August 19, 1995 when he fought WBA champion Bruce Seldon at the MGM Grand Garden Arena. In May 2009, he was inducted into the American Indian Athletic Hall of Fame.

== Professional career ==
Hipp began his professional career with a 4-round decision over Steve Cortez at the Lane County Fairgrounds in Eugene, Oregon on August 29, 1987. For his second fight 2 months later, Hipp travelled to Carson City, Nevada to face Utah native Veti Katoa. The fight was stopped by the ringside doctor after Hipp suffered a broken jaw in the third round.

Hipp rebounded successfully from the defeat by notching 3 consecutive first-round knockout victories before facing Katoa in a rematch at Gardnerville Park in Gardnerville, Nevada on July 2, 1988. Hipp dominated the action on the inside with his hard-hitting, banging style to take a 5-round unanimous decision.

Hipp then took a year-long hiatus from boxing before returning to face Andrew Matthews on the 4th of July of the following year. Outweighing his opponent by over 30 pounds, Hipp punched his way to a first-round stoppage. Exactly two weeks later, Hipp scored a unanimous four-round decision over up-and-coming contender Cleveland Woods in what Ring Magazine referred to as "...the upset of the night" on the card for that evening.

Hipp began another winning streak (including a brutal third-round knockout of Katoa in their third and final meeting) before facing Bert Cooper in Cooper's final bout prior to his fight with Evander Holyfield for the world title one month later. Cooper outslugged Hipp en route to a fifth-round stoppage by referee Joe Cortez.

Hipp again rebounded by winning 3 consecutive contests before facing Tommy Morrison on June 27, 1992 in Reno, Nevada. In a slugfest that saw Morrison break his jaw and one of his hands, Hipp lost by a 9th-round TKO, resulting in broken cheekbones for Hipp. After recovering from his injuries, Hipp fought once in 1993, earning a victory with a ten-round decision in a rematch with Kevin Ford.

Hipp began 1994 with a victory over Alex Garcia for the fringe NABF heavyweight title and finished the year with two more wins. He began the following year by continuing his winning ways with a third-round TKO of journeyman Phillip Brown. This win would lead to Hipp's most important bout, the fight that would land him in the history books as the first Native American to challenge for one of the four recognized heavyweight title belts.

=== WBA Heavyweight Title Bout ===
On August 19, 1995 at the MGM Grand Garden Arena in Las Vegas on the undercard of the infamous Mike Tyson vs. Peter McNeeley fight (Tyson's first fight after being released from prison for rape), Hipp squared off against Bruce Seldon for the WBA Heavyweight championship. With Seldon well ahead on all scorecards, the fight was stopped in the tenth round by referee Richard Steele after Hipp experienced massive swelling and bleeding on his face.

=== Career Decline ===
Hipp's career was rather undistinguished afterwards. He fired off a series of victories over third-rate competition before being knocked out by hard-hitting journeyman Ross Puritty on June 15, 1997. Hipp had secured a comfortable lead on the scorecards before Puritty came out swinging for the tenth and final round of their bout. An exhausted Hipp was no match for Puritty in the last round and he suffered another KO defeat. Hipp racked up three consecutive victories against nondescript competition after the Puritty fight, but then blew out his knee against Jeff Pegues in a fifth-round TKO loss on December 9, 1999.

He attempted a comeback four years later, but that came to an abrupt end in his second fight as he dropped a six-round decision to journeyman Billy Zumbrun on November 14, 2003.

Hipp, referred to as "the Boss" by his loyal fans, returned from another extended layoff to win a six-round decision over Ted Reiter on August 13, 2005, in what was his final fight.

== Professional boxing record ==
43 Wins (29 knockouts, 14 decisions), 7 Losses (6 knockouts, 1 decision)
Result	Record	Opponent	Type	Round	Date	Location	Notes
Win	43–7	(United States) Ted Reiter	MD	6	13/08/2005	(United States) Lewiston, Idaho, U.S.	
Loss	42–7	(United States) Billy Zumbrun	MD	6	14/11/2003	(United States) Seattle, Washington, U.S.	
Win	42–6	(United States) Chris Brown	KO	2	22/08/2003	(United States) Spokane, Washington, U.S.	Brown knocked out at 2:37 of the second round.
Loss	41–6	(United States) Jeff Pegues	TKO	5	09/12/1999	(United States) Mount Pleasant, Michigan, U.S.	Hipp suffered a severe knee injury during the fight causing a stoppage.
Win	41–5	(United States) Everett Martin	UD	12	25/06/1999	(United States) Saint Charles, Missouri, U.S.	WBF World heavyweight title.
Win	40–5	(United States) Jack Basting	UD	10	27/03/1998	(United States) Tacoma, Washington, U.S.	
Win	39–5	(Canada) George McFall	TKO	2	11/02/1998	(United States) Yakima, Washington, U.S.	
Loss	38–5	(United States) Ross Puritty	KO	10	15/06/1997	(United States) Biloxi, Mississippi, U.S.	
Win	38–4	(United States) Marcus Rhode	TKO	1	29/03/1997	(United States) Bellevue, Washington, U.S.	
Win	37–4	(United States) Lorenzo Boyd	KO	1	10/03/1997	(United States) Kansas City, Missouri, U.S.	Boyd knocked out at 2:45 of the first round.
Win	36–4	(United States) Will Hinton	TKO	1	13/12/1996	(United States) Tacoma, Washington, U.S.	Referee stopped the bout at 1:30 of the first round.
Win	35–4	(Canada) Troy Roberts	KO	2	05/10/1996	(United States) Yakima, Washington, U.S.	
Win	34–4	(United States) Fred Houpe	TKO	1	23/09/1996	(United States) Bellevue, Washington, U.S.	Referee stopped the bout at 1:55 of the first round.
Win	33–4	(United States) Bill Corrigan	KO	1	04/08/1996	(United States) Sequim, Washington, U.S.	Corrigan knocked out at 1:39 of the first round.
Win	32–4	(United States) Anthony Moore	TKO	5	17/07/1996	(United States) Worley, Idaho, U.S.	Western States heavyweight title.
Win	31–4	(Mexico) Martin Jacques	TKO	1	15/12/1995	(United States) Yakima, Washington, U.S.	
Loss	30–4	(United States) Bruce Seldon	TKO	10	19/08/1995	(United States) Las Vegas, Nevada, U.S.	WBA World heavyweight title. Referee stopped the bout at 1:47 of the tenth round.
Win	30–3	(United States) Philipp Brown	TKO	3	17/04/1995	(United States) Moline, Illinois, U.S.	
Win	29–3	(Puerto Rico) Rodolfo Marin	SD	10	01/11/1994	(United States) Las Vegas, Nevada, U.S.	
Win	28–3	(Cuba) José Ribalta	KO	2	10/05/1994	(United States) Mashantucket, Connecticut, U.S.	NABF heavyweight title. Ribalta knocked out at 1:53 of the second round.
Win	27–3	(United States) Alex Garcia	UD	12	01/03/1994	(United States) Atlantic City, New Jersey, U.S.	NABF heavyweight title.
Win	26–3	(United States) Keith McMurray	KO	4	14/01/1994	(United States) Saint George, Utah, U.S.	McMurray knocked out at 2:52 of the fourth round.
Win	25–3	(United States) Kevin Ford	UD	10	03/04/1993	(United States) Las Vegas, Nevada, U.S.	
Loss	24–3	(United States) Tommy Morrison	TKO	9	27/06/1992	(United States) Reno, Nevada, U.S.	Referee stopped the bout at 2:47 of the ninth round.
Win	24–2	(United States) Jesse Shelby	UD	10	28/02/1992	(United States) Las Vegas, Nevada, U.S.	
Win	23–2	(United States) Kevin Ford	UD	8	01/02/1992	(United States) Las Vegas, Nevada, U.S.	
Win	22–2	(United States) John Morton	KO	3	05/01/1992	(United States) Reno, Nevada, U.S.	Morton knocked out at 3:00 of the third round.
Loss	21–2	(United States) Bert Cooper	TKO	5	Oct 18, 1991	(United States) Atlantic City, New Jersey, U.S.	Referee stopped the bout at 1:01 of the fifth round.
Win	21–1	(United States) Cleveland Woods	KO	1	15/07/1991	(United States) Irvine, California, U.S.	Woods knocked out at 0:27 of the first round.
Win	20–1	(United States) Bill Duncan	KO	1	02/07/1991	(United States) Phoenix, Arizona, U.S.	
Win	19–1	(United States) David Bey	TKO	7	26/02/1991	(United States) Birmingham, Alabama, U.S.	Referee stopped the bout at 1:07 of the seventh round.
Win	18–1	(United States) Mike Cohen	KO	4	14/01/1991	(United States) Fife, Washington, U.S.	World Boxing Foundation (WBFo) Intercontinental heavyweight title. Cohen knocked out at 2:30 of the fourth round.
Win	17–1	(United States) Richard Cade	KO	2	16/11/1990	(United States) Fort Lewis, Washington, U.S.	Cade knocked out at 0:52 of the second round.
Win	16–1	(United States) Harry Terrell	KO	2	11/09/1990	(United States) Fife, Washington, U.S.	Terrell knocked out at 2:14 of the second round.
Win	15–1	(Mexico) Gerardo Valero	KO	1	26/07/1990	(United States) Yakima, Washington, U.S.	Valero knocked out at 3:04 of the first round.
Win	14–1	(United States) Tracy Thomas	UD	10	12/06/1990	(United States) Yakima, Washington, U.S.	
Win	13–1	(United States) Danny Wofford	PTS	6	24/04/1990	(United States) Reseda, California, U.S.	
Win	12–1	(United States) Veti Katoa	KO	3	16/03/1990	(United States) Butte, Montana, U.S.	
Win	11–1	(United States) Dan Ross	KO	1	12/02/1990	(United States) Butte, Montana, U.S.	Ross knocked out at 2:09 of the first round.
Win	10–1	(United States) Marvin Camel	TKO	6	02/12/1989	(United States) Lacey, Washington, U.S.	
Win	9–1	(United States) Sean McClain	TKO	4	26/09/1989	(United States) Las Vegas, Nevada, U.S.	
Win	8–1	(United States) Shaun Ayers	UD	10	26/08/1989	(United States) Eugene, Oregon, U.S.	
Win	7–1	(United States) Cleveland Woods	UD	4	18/07/1989	(United States) Las Vegas, Nevada, U.S.	
Win	6–1	(United States) Andrew Matthews	TKO	1	04/07/1989	(United States) Gardnerville, Nevada, U.S.	Referee stopped the bout at 0:34 of the first round.
Win	5–1	(United States) Veti Kotoa	UD	5	02/07/1988	(United States) Gardnerville, Nevada, U.S.	
Win	4–1	(United States) Steve Cortez	TKO	1	18/06/1988	(United States) Vancouver, Washington, U.S.	
Win	3–1	(United States) Paul Bradshaw	TKO	1	04/06/1988	(United States) Albany, Oregon, U.S.	
Win	2–1	(United States) John Elkins	TKO	1	02/06/1988	(United States) Portland, Oregon, U.S.	
Loss	1–1	(United States) Veti Katoa	TKO	3	24/10/1987	(United States) Carson City, Nevada, U.S.	
Win	1–0	(United States) Steve Cortez	UD	4	29/08/1987	(United States) Eugene, Oregon, U.S.	

== Outside the Ring ==
In 2004, Rocky Mountain College and the Billings Writer's Voice sponsored a poetry reading held by various Native American groups in tribute to Hipp.

In December 2005, Hipp was a FEMA worker for the Hurricane Katrina disaster. Responding to the call, he joined his fellow Blackfeet members who were called upon due to their experience in wildfires and search and rescue missions.

By 2007 Hipp was working for his former manager Ray Frye at a Seattle area sweeping company. He also co-owned a small construction company.
