= Steve Lott =

American boxing manager (1950–2021)

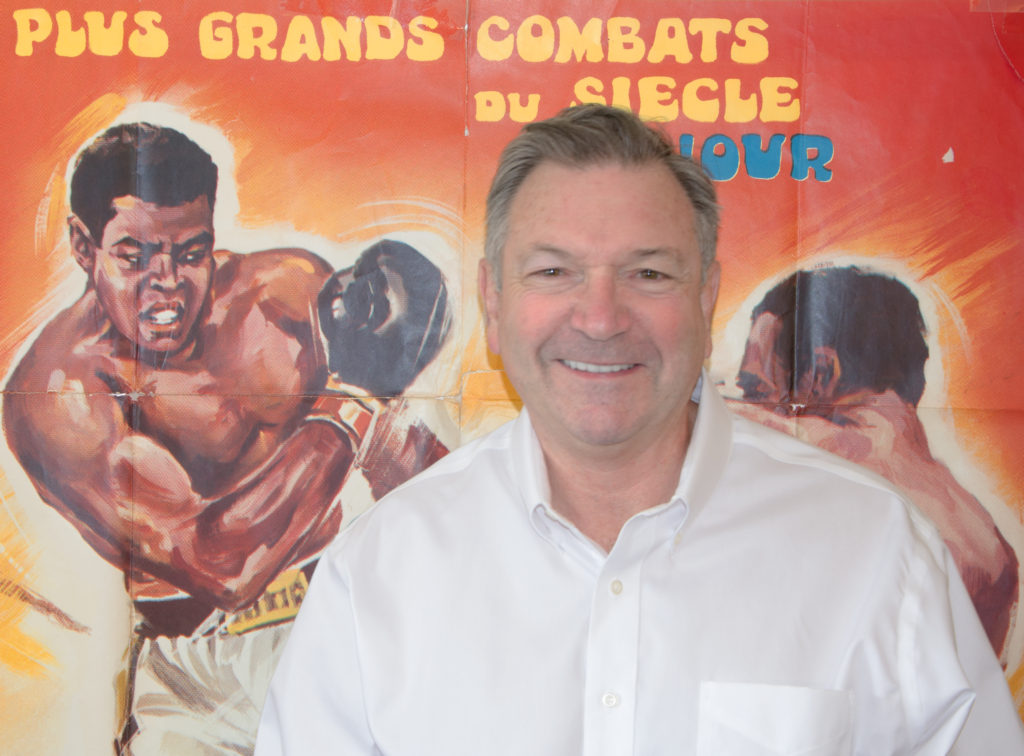
- Steve Lott was the CEO of Boxing Hall of Fame Las Vegas Nevada, boxing manager, boxing film historian
- Born: Steven Lott; January 17, 1950
- Died: November 6, 2021 (aged 71); Las Vegas, Nevada, U.S.
- Occupation: Manager
- Known for: Founder of BHOF, film editor, camp coordinator of world champions as Edwin Rosario, Wilfred Benítez, Mike Tyson, Tommy Morrison, Jeremy Williams, Michael Grant, Vinny Pazienza

Signature
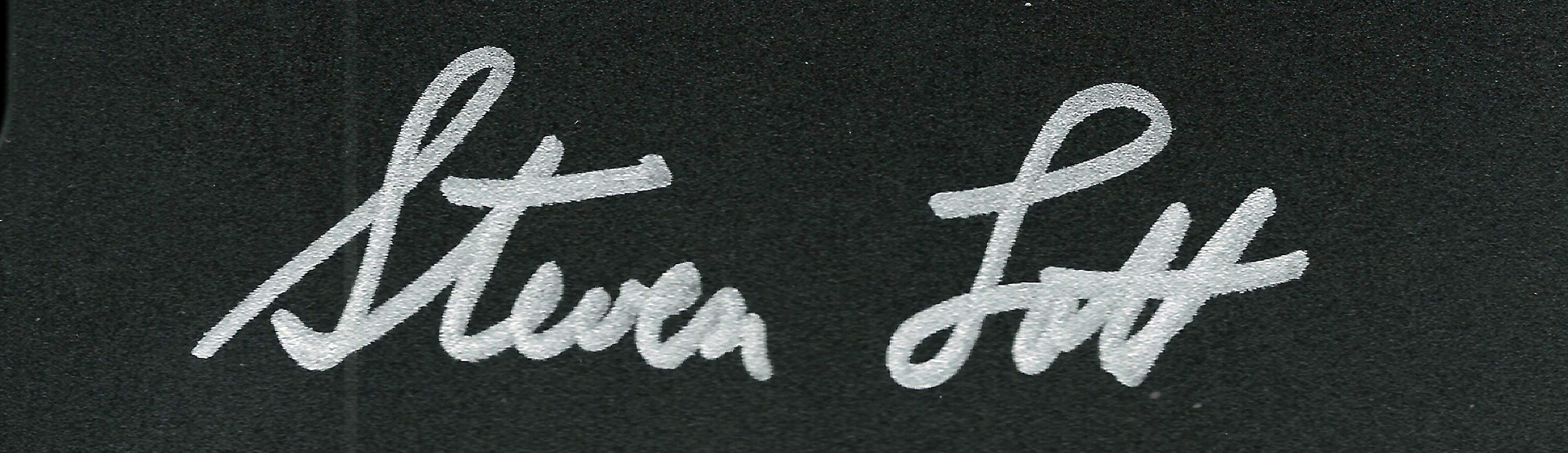

Steve Lott (January 17, 1950 – November 6, 2021) was an American boxing manager. He was the CEO of the Boxing Hall of Fame Las Vegas Nevada, a film editor at ESPN, boxing film historian and assistant to fight managers Bill Cayton and Jim Jacobs. He financed Mike Tyson's boxing coach and life mentor Cus D'Amato.

== Career ==
He was an executive producer at the Big Fights, Inc., and assistant manager of ten fighters, including five world champions.

Over a thirty-year span at Big Fights, Inc. 1972 – 1998, beginning as a film editor and culminating as executive producer, he had hands-on experience with every frame of what is now the ESPN/Classic Sports film and tape library.

As the assistant manager and then manager of over ten fighters, he has built relationships with the leading members of the boxing press, as well as many noted trainers, boxers, referees, promoters, and boxing celebrities. He also assisted such venues as the South Street Seaport Museum and National Museum of American Jewish History with the development of boxing exhibits. He appeared on Larry King Live and in many boxing documentaries and TV specials.

== Death ==
On November 6, 2021, it was announced on the Boxing Hall of Fame Las Vegas Facebook page that founder and CEO Steve Lott died peacefully in his sleep surrounded by his loved ones.

== Filmography ==
- Fallen Champ: The Untold Story of Mike Tyson (1993)
- Ali vs. Frazier: The Fight of the Century
- Knockout (1977)
- The Garden's Defining Moments
- Thrilla in Manila

== Sources ==
- "Boxing Hall of Fame". Boxing Hall of Fame.
- "Fallen Champ: The Untold Story of Mike Tyson (1993)". IMDb.
- "Ali vs. Frazier: The Fight of the Century". IMDb.
- "The Garden's Defining Moments". IMDb.
- "Knockout (1977)". IMDb.
- "Thrilla in Manila". IMDb.
