= George Foreman vs. Pierre Coetzer =

Boxing match

Heavy Damage
- Date: January 16, 1993
- Venue: Reno-Sparks Convention Center, Reno, Nevada

Tale of the tape
Boxer	George Foreman	Pierre Coetzer
Nickname	Big	
Hometown	Houston, Texas, U.S.	Pretoria, Gauteng, South Africa
Purse	$5,000,000	$170,000
Pre-fight record	71–3 (66 KO)	39–4 (27 KO)
Age	44 years	31 years, 1 month
Height	6 ft 4 in (193 cm)	6 ft 4 in (193 cm)
Weight	258 lb (117 kg)	216 lb (98 kg)
Style	Orthodox	Orthodox
Recognition	IBF; No. 1 Ranked Heavyweight; WBA/WBC; No. 4 Ranked Heavyweight; The Ring; No. 6 Ranked Heavyweight; Former Undisputed Champion	IBF; No. 12 Ranked Heavyweight

Result
- Foreman wins via 8th-round technical knockout

George Foreman vs. Pierre Coetzer, billed as Heavy Damage, was a professional boxing match contested on January 16, 1993.

== Background ==
Nine months prior, George Foreman had arguably the toughest fight of his comeback against former heavyweight contender Alex Stewart. Foreman scored two knockdowns in the second round which proved to be crucial as Stewart gave him a much tougher fight than expected as Foreman, whose face was severely swollen by the end of the fight, barely eked out a majority decision victory, winning two scorecards by a single point, whilst the third had the bout even. Though Foreman expressed interest in continuing his boxing career in order to get another world title opportunity, Foreman answered "possibly" when asked if the Stewart fight would be his last.

In mid-November 1992, any doubt that Foreman had fought for the last time was erased when it was announced that he would return to the ring to face heavyweight contender Pierre Coetzer in Reno, Nevada. Co-headlining with Foreman and Coetzer would be a fight between popular heavyweight Tommy Morrison (IBF:6th, The Ring:9th, WBA:10th) and two-time heavyweight title challenger Carl "The Truth" Williams. Foreman and Morrison were then expected to face each other next should they both be victorious in their respective matches.

== Fight Details ==
Foreman used his trademark left jab to his advantage, with 147 of the 210 punches he landed being such. Coetzer was the more active of the two fighters, throwing 462 punches but Foreman managed to block a large majority of Coetzer's offense as he was managed to land just 174. Foreman, meanwhile, had little trouble landing punches on Coetzer, scoring 210 out of 323 thrown punches for a 65% success rate. Coetzer entered the fight with a cut on his nose that Foreman quickly reopened in the first round and although the wound bled profusely for the remainder of the fight, it did not seem to affect Coetzer's performance. One minute into the fourth round, Foreman scored the first of two knockdowns, sending Coetzer down flat on his back after landing a left hook. Coetzer answered referee Joe Cortez's 10-count at eight and was allowed to continue. Foreman landed several more heavy blows on Coetzer and implored Cortez to stop the fight, screaming "what is wrong with you?", though Coetzer survived the round. The second knockdown came midway through the eighth round after Foreman scored with a left-right combination that sent Coetzer down to his knees. Though Coetzer once again beat the count and was allowed to continue, after Foreman landed a few more blows to a clearly battered and exhausted Coetzer, Cortez stepped in and stopped the fight at 1:48 of the round, securing the TKO victory for Foreman.

== Aftermath ==
Foreman's victory coupled with Morrison's put the two fighters on course for a showdown later in the year. Foreman expressed doubt about facing Morrison, who was 20 years younger and revered for his knockout power, telling the media after the fight that he would "have to sleep" on whether or not he would face Morrison as planned, though promoter Bob Arum maintained that Foreman had already signed on for the fight and claimed it would be Foreman's next fight unless he retired. A month later, Foreman confirmed that he would proceed with the fight against Morrison though the original April 16 date was pushed back to June 5 at his request.

== Fight card ==
Confirmed bouts:

Weight Class	Weight		vs.		Method	Round	Notes
Heavyweight	200+ lbs.	George Foreman	def.	Pierre Coetzer	TKO	8/10
Heavyweight	200+ lbs.	Tommy Morrison	def.	Carl Williams	TKO	8/10
Welterweight	147 lbs.	Vince Phillips	def.	Julio Flores	TKO	1/10
Heavyweight	200+	Francois Botha	def.	Billy Wright	TKO	5/8

== Broadcasting ==
Country	Broadcaster
United States	HBO

Preceded by vs. Alex Stewart	George Foreman's bouts 16 January 1993	Succeeded by vs. Tommy Morrison
Preceded by vs. Frank Bruno	Pierre Coetzer's bouts 16 January 1993	Retired
