= Art Tucker =

American boxer

Arthur Tucker (born January 29, 1959) is a heavyweight boxer from Newark, New Jersey.

He started boxing while incarcerated in Rahway State Prison, N.J. for 12 years. Art Tucker, nicknamed Champ, launched his career after being released in 1987 with 15 wins in a row. At one point during this time, he was rumored to be a possible opponent for heavyweight champion Evander Holyfield, but this fight never materialized. Since 1989 he suffered severe losses to Riddick Bowe, Tommy Morrison and Tim Witherspoon. He ultimately retired in 1993 after a win against Mark Young. His record in 27 professional fights shows 21 wins (15 K.O.), 5 losses (5 K.O.) and 1 draw. For some time he was trained by Teddy Atlas, who also coached former heavyweight world-champion Michael Moorer.
