= Kevin Ford (boxer) =

American boxer (born 1962)

Kevin Ford (born August 3, 1962) is an American former heavyweight professional boxer.

== Amateur career ==
Ford is a native of Sacramento, California, graduating from Rio Linda High School, but he moved to Houston in 1987 to further his boxing career. He had a stellar amateur career, becoming the 1988 National Golden Gloves super heavyweight champion. Prior to the win, he lost to Riddick Bowe in 1988 Olympic Trials.

== Professional career ==
Ford turned pro in 1989 and was undefeated in his first 9 bouts before losing to Tony Willis by TKO in 1990. He then lost a decision to Joe Hipp in 1992 and again in 1993. He retired later that year after a TKO loss to James Smith.

== Professional boxing record ==
14 Wins (10 knockouts, 4 decisions), 4 Losses (2 knockouts, 2 decisions)
Result	Record	Opponent	Type	Round	Date	Location	Notes
Loss	14-4	(United States) James Smith	TKO	9	26/06/1993	Atlantic City, New Jersey, U.S.	
Loss	14-3	(United States) Joe Hipp	UD	10	03/04/1993	Las Vegas, Nevada, U.S.	
Win	14-2	(United States) Keith McMurray	TKO	7	27/02/1993	Beijing, China	Referee stopped the bout at 2:56 of the seventh round.
Win	13-2	(United States) Terry Verners	TKO	1	11/07/1992	The Aladdin, Paradise, Nevada, U.S.	
Win	12-2	(United States) John Morton	PTS	8	06/05/1992	Bakersfield, California, U.S.	
Loss	11-2	(United States) Joe Hipp	UD	8	01/02/1992	Caesars Palace, Paradise, Nevada, U.S.	
Win	11-1	(United States) Lionel Butler	PTS	8	29/04/1991	Great Western Forum, Inglewood, California, U.S.	
Win	10-1	(United States) John Morton	PTS	6	28/02/1991	San Diego, California, U.S.	
Loss	9-1	(United States) Tony Willis	TKO	7	23/04/1990	Great Western Forum, Inglewood, California, U.S.	Referee stopped the bout at 2:50 of the seventh round.
Win	9-0	(United States) Sammy Speech	KO	1	22/02/1990	Civic Plaza, Phoenix, Arizona, U.S.	Speech knocked out at 1:38 of the first round.
Win	8-0	(United States) Richard Cade	KO	3	13/02/1990	Long Beach, California, U.S.	
Win	7-0	(United States) Jose Herrera	KO	2	08/12/1989	Richfield, Utah, U.S.	
Win	6-0	(United States) Steve Cortez	KO	1	13/11/1989	Great Western Forum, Inglewood, California, U.S.	
Win	5-0	(United States) Don Askew	TKO	1	12/10/1989	Richfield, Utah, U.S.	
Win	4-0	(United States) Dion Burgess	KO	2	29/06/1989	Del Mar, California, U.S.	
Win	3-0	(United States) Herman Pettigrew	KO	1	05/06/1989	Great Western Forum, Inglewood, California, U.S.	
Win	2-0	(United States) Craig Murray	DQ	1	15/05/1989	Great Western Forum, Inglewood, California, U.S.	
Win	1-0	(United States) Rocky Pepeli	KO	1	28/02/1989	Great Western Forum, Inglewood, California, U.S.	
