= Tommy Morrison vs. Michael Bentt =

Boxing match

The Tulsa Shootout
- Date: October 29, 1993
- Venue: Tulsa Convention Center, Tulsa, Oklahoma, U.S.
- Title(s) on the line: WBO Heavyweight Championship

Tale of the tape
Boxer	Tommy Morrison	Michael Bentt
Nickname	The Duke	
Hometown	Jay, Oklahoma, U.S.	Queens, New York, U.S.
Purse	$1,200,000	$135,000
Pre-fight record	38–1 (33 KO)	10–1 (5 KO)
Age	24 years, 9 months	28 years, 1 month
Height	6 ft 2 in (188 cm)	6 ft 3 in (191 cm)
Weight	226 3/4 lb (103 kg)	226 lb (103 kg)
Style	Orthodox	Orthodox
Recognition	WBO; Heavyweight Champion; The Ring; No. 4 Ranked Heavyweight	WBO; No. 9 Ranked Heavyweight

Result
- Bentt wins via 1st-round technical knockout

Tommy Morrison vs. Michael Bentt, billed as The Tulsa Shootout, was a professional boxing match contested on October 29, 1993 for the WBO Heavyweight championship.

== Background ==
On October 18, 1991, the then-undefeated Tommy Morrison lost to Ray Mercer via 5th-round knockout in his first attempt at capturing the WBO heavyweight title.

Following his loss, Morrison strung together eight consecutive victories before landing another shot at the vacant WBO title against popular 44-year-old former heavyweight champion George Foreman. Through the course of the fight, Morrison abandoned his aggressive style and used constant movement to keep Foreman off balance. Though the pro-Foreman crowd booed Morrison for using the tactic, it nevertheless paid off as Morrison was able to pick up a lopsided unanimous decision, winning by two scores of 117–110 and one score of 118–109, becoming the new WBO heavyweight champion in the process.

Originally, Morrison's first defense was scheduled to be against his Rocky V co-star Mike Williams, but Williams pulled out only an hour before the fight after refusing to take a pre-fight drug test. As such, Morrison proceeded to defeat unknown journeyman Tim Tomashek in what would ultimately become a non-title bout after the WBO refused to sanction the fight.

A month prior, Morrison had reached an agreement to face the undefeated Lennox Lewis for Lewis' WBC heavyweight title. However, before moving on to face Lewis, Morrison chose to first defend his WBO title against the virtually unknown Michael Bentt, who was a highly decorated amateur, but had only 11 fights in five years as a professional.

Bentt went on to fight Morrison reportedly not fully recovered from an arm fracture.

== The fights ==
=== Toney vs. Thornton ===
The Tulsa Shootout: James Toney vs. Tony Thornton
- Title(s) on the line: IBF super middleweight title

Tale of the tape
Boxer	James Toney	Tony Thornton
Nickname	Lights Out	The Punching Postman
Hometown	Grand Rapids, Michigan, U.S.	Glassboro, New Jersey, U.S.
Pre-fight record	39–0–2 (26 KO)	35–5 (25 KO)
Age	25 years, 2 months	33 years, 11 months
Height	5 ft 8 in (173 cm)	5 ft 11 in (180 cm)
Weight	168 lb (76 kg)	167 lb (76 kg)
Style	Orthodox	Orthodox
Recognition	IBF; Super Middleweight Champion; The Ring; No. 1 Ranked Super Middleweight; The Ring No. 4 ranked pound-for-pound fighter 2-division world champion	IBF; No. 3 Ranked Super Middleweight; The Ring; No. 8 Ranked Super Middleweight

Result
- Toney wins via unanimous decision

In the chief support James Toney made the first defense of the IBF super middleweight title he had won from Iran Barkley in February, against No. 3 ranked Tony Thornton (WBC:6th, WBA:12th).

Toney was originally set to face No. 1 contender and former champion Darrin Van Horn, however he pulled out of the fight after claiming a shoulder injury.

==== The fight ====
In a somewhat tentative fight Toney was able to keep out of reach of Thornton's jab.

Toney was able to get Thornton against the ropes in the 9th round, landing a hard left and an overhead right, however neither man was able to land any seriously damaging blows. The lack of action prompted boos from the roughly 7,200 crowd.

At the end of 12 rounds Judge Paul Weitzel scored it 118–110, Steve Epstein 118–110 and Lucien Joubert 116–112 all in favour of the champion. HBO's unofficial scorer Harold Lederman also had it 118–110.

According to Compubox, Toney landed 431 of 1,011 total punches (43%) while Thornton connected on 323 of 827 (39%).

==== Aftermath ====
Speaking after the bout Toney said "I had the jab in his face all night, I beat him decisively can't anybody dispute that." When asked about the boos from the crowd he responded "I don't care what the crowd thinks, they wanted to see blood and guts. I fight to win."

Preceded by vs. Larry Prather	James Toney's bouts 29 October 1993	Succeeded by vs. Anthony Hembrick
Preceded by vs. Willie Ball	Tony Thornton's bouts 29 October 1993	Succeeded by vs. Lenzie Morgan

=== Main Event ===
Morrison was able to quickly get Bentt's back up against the ropes and staggered him twice with left hooks. Morrison would hit Bentt with a multiple-punch combination, but soon tired, allowing Bentt to counter with a combination of his own that sent Morrison down to the canvas only 50 seconds into the round. Morrison was able to answer the referee's count, but Bentt quickly attacked him with another powerful combination that sent Morrison into the ropes and back onto the canvas only seconds after the first knockdown. With Morrison clearly shaken up from the knockdowns and the three knockdown rule in effect, Bentt relentlessly continued to hammer Morrison with another powerful combination in an effort to get the deciding knockdown. After backing Morrison into the ropes, Bentt landed a six-punch combination that again sent Morrison down. The fight was immediately stopped and Bentt was named the winner by technical knockout at 1:33 of the first round, becoming the new WBO Heavyweight Champion.

== Aftermath ==
Morrison's loss not only cost him the WBO title, but also his planned $8 million WBC title fight with Lennox Lewis. Morrison would go undefeated in his next eight fights, which concluded with a knockout of former number one contender Donovan "Razor" Ruddock that got him back into contention. After a WBO heavyweight title match with Riddick Bowe fell through, he finally met Lewis in a non-title bout on October 7, 1995, ultimately losing by sixth round knockout.

Bentt, meanwhile, would make the first defense of his title on March 19, 1994 against British fighter Herbie Hide. Bentt was knocked out in the seventh round and had to be rushed to the hospital where he spent four days in a medically induced coma after suffering brain damage. Though he eventually made a full recovery, the injuries were severe enough that Bentt was forced to retire shortly after.

== Undercard ==
Confirmed bouts:

== Broadcasting ==
Country	Broadcaster
Canada	TSN
United Kingdom	Sky Sports
United States	HBO

Preceded by vs. Tim Tomashek	Tommy Morrison's bouts 29 October 1993	Succeeded by vs. Tui Toia
Preceded by vs. Mark Wills	Michael Bentt's bouts 29 October 1993	Succeeded by vs. Herbie Hide
Awards
Preceded by Jeff Fenech vs. Azumah Nelson II	KO Magazine Upset of the Year; 1993	Award Discontinued
