= John Daly (producer) =

British film producer (1937–2008)

- Born: 16 July 1937; England
- Died: 31 October 2008 (aged 71)

John Daly (16 July 1937 – 31 October 2008) was a British film producer.

== Personal life ==
John Daly was born in South East London, a part of London which was badly bombed and damaged in World War II; his father was a dockworker. He attended St Joseph's Roman Catholic school in Camberwell. He served the Merchant Navy, then sold insurance before founding the Hemdale Film Corporation with David Henmings. Daly was father to Jenny, Michael, Jonathan, Julian, and Timothy.

== Career ==
=== Music ===
With David Hemmings, Daly formed Hemdale Film Corporation in 1967. Hemdale had many diverse entertainment business interests, and grew rapidly in the 1970s by managing bands such as Yes and Black Sabbath. The company also acquired the worldwide stage rights for Lionel Bart's musical Oliver!, along with producing Grease in 1973, starring Richard Gere.

=== Film ===
Hemdale began producing, financing and distributing its own full-length feature films, becoming a leading independent film company in Britain with films such as Melody, Tommy, The Triple Echo and Images by Robert Altman.

Hemdale gave career starts to actors such as Keanu Reeves, Denzel Washington, and Julia Roberts. It also worked with directors including James Cameron (The Terminator); Oliver Stone (Salvador, Platoon); Mick Jackson (The Bodyguard); Martin Campbell (James Bond and The Legend of Zorro); Michael Apted (Coal Miner's Daughter); Robert Altman (Images); John Schlesinger (The Falcon and the Snowman), Ken Loach (Hidden Agenda); Harold Becker (The Boost); Gillian Armstrong (High Tide); Tim Hunter (River's Edge) and James Foley (At Close Range). Under Daly, Hemdale made over 100 films, grossing over $1.5 billion.

In 2003, he wrote and directed Petersburg-Cannes Express (Russian: Экспресс Петербург-Канны). In 2004, Daly produced, co-wrote and directed The Aryan Couple, starring Oscar winner Martin Landau, which received numerous awards at international film festivals. Daly also directed The Box Collector for Corsan Productions.

=== Sport ===
In 1974, Don King was trying to promote "The Rumble in the Jungle" heavyweight boxing match between George Foreman and Muhammad Ali. He turned to Daly, who together with Video Techniques Inc. (of which King was a director), were the official co-promoters.

In 1994, Daly conceived the High Noon in Hong Kong boxing event, investing at least $800,000 of his own money, but it was cancelled at the last minute after Barry Hearn withdrew his boxers when no purses were forthcoming. "My end of the deal was kept," Daly argued. "I had to arrange the stadium, air fares and all the pre-fight promotional expenses, which I did, but the purses were not part of my obligation."

== Business interests ==
Daly's company Hemdale acquired an ownership interest in a TV company, its own film studios, and an off-track betting company chain of shops.

From 2003, Daly acted as Chairman, CEO and President of Film and Music Entertainment, Inc. and its subsidiaries. In May 2008, he took a leave of absence from his executive duties. He remained chairman until his death.

== Death ==
John Daly, 71, died on 31 October 2008 of cancer. He was survived by his daughter, Jenny, and three sons, Michael, Julian and Timothy.

== Awards ==
On behalf of his companies, Daly achieved 21 Oscar nominations and 13 wins, including consecutive Best Picture wins for Platoon and The Last Emperor (as executive producer, shared with the film's producer Jeremy Thomas), an unequaled achievement in independent filmmaking.

Throughout his forty-year career, Daly won numerous awards at the Golden Globes, the Cannes Film Festival, the Berlin International Film Festival, the Independent Spirit Awards and the Houston Film Festival, along with many other prizes.
