= Ross Puritty =

American boxer (born 1966)

Personal information
- Nickname: The Boss
- Nationality: American
- Born: Ross Puritty; December 18, 1966 (age 59) Phoenix, Arizona, U.S.
- Height: 6 ft 3 in (1.91 m)
- Weight: Heavyweight

Boxing career
- Reach: 80 in (203 cm)
- Stance: Orthodox stance

Boxing record
- Total fights: 54
- Wins: 31
- Win by KO: 27
- Losses: 20
- Draws: 3

Ross Puritty (born December 18, 1966) is an American former professional boxer. A high-level journeyman and occasional heavyweight contender, Puritty is remembered for his fight with Wladimir Klitschko in 1998 in which he won the World Boxing Council (WBC) International heavyweight title, as well as for fighting former World Boxing Organization (WBO) world heavyweight champion, Tommy Morrison, to a draw. He also holds victories over former world title challengers Jorge Luis Gonzalez and Joe Hipp.

== Football and professional boxing career ==
Puritty played as a defensive lineman at UTEP for four seasons, starting on the 1988 team that won 10 games and went to the program's first bowl in 20 years. Over the course of his college career, he recorded 12 sacks, 18 pass breakups, and forced 8 fumbles. In the summer before his senior season, Puritty began training to become a professional boxer, adopting a peek-a-boo defensive stance with very high hands inspired by Floyd Patterson. He did not have an amateur career and initially struggled professionally, losing to Cleveland Woods by technical knockout after being knocked down twice in his second fight. Through his first six professional fights Puritty had compiled a mediocre record of 3–3, and after thirteen professional fights he fell to 6–7, with five of his defeats being on points.

A July 1994 match against Tommy Morrison, 41–2 at the time, was a turning point in Puritty's career, as he was outlanded and tired out near the end of the fight, but the bout was scored a draw after ten rounds on the strength of Puritty's two knockdowns of Morrison. Puritty then went on a tear, winning his next ten consecutive bouts, all by knockout. Puritty had made his name and was now considered a top-tier opponent, earning matches against Hasim Rahman and Michael Grant (both of whom beat him on points), and against Jorge Luis Gonzalez and Joe Hipp, both of whom Puritty beat. Following the win against Hipp, Puritty was matched against world title contenders Corrie Sanders, Larry Donald, and Chris Byrd, losing all three fights on points. In 1998 on his way to a four fight winning streak, Puritty defeated Mark Hulstrom, then knocked out Wladimir Klitschko to win his first championship belt; it was Klitschko's first loss, and would be one of only five losses in his illustrious professional career.

After a draw with Frankie Swindell in January 2000, Puritty posted a record of 4–7–2, finishing with a career record of 31 wins and 20 losses, including 27 knockouts.

Puritty has been generally acknowledged as a fighter with an "iron chin" due to his ability to absorb heavy blows. After the two early stoppages - one TKO and one retirement - he was only stopped again once in his career, by a small cut to the eyebrow, by Vitali Klitschko: the other 17 of his defeats all went the distance.

Ross Puritty now resides in Wichita, Kansas with his wife and five children and works as a salesperson at Lexus of Wichita.

== Professional boxing record ==
54 fights	31 wins	20 losses
By knockout	26	3
By decision	4	17
By disqualification	1	0
Draws	3	

No.	Result	Record	Opponent	Type	Round(s), time	Date	Age	Location	Notes
54	Win	31–20–3	Carl Gathright	MD	8	Oct 27, 2007	40 years, 313 days	River Rock Casino, Richmond, British Columbia, Canada	
53	Loss	30–20–3	David Cadieux	UD	10	Feb 10, 2007	40 years, 54 days	Montreal Casino, Montreal, Quebec, Canada	
52	Loss	30–19–3	Eddie Chambers	UD	10	May 17, 2005	38 years, 150 days	Blue Horizon, Philadelphia, Pennsylvania, U.S.	
51	Loss	30–18–3	Alexander Dimitrenko	UD	8	Nov 6, 2004	37 years, 324 days	Erdgas Arena, Riesa, Sachsen, Germany	
50	Win	30–17–3	Tommy Connelly	TKO	4 (6), 3:00	Jan 24, 2004	37 years, 37 days	Fire Lake Casino, Shawnee, Oklahoma, U.S.	
49	Win	29–17–3	John Dixon	KO	2 (6), 1:28	Aug 2, 2003	36 years, 227 days	Northern Lights Casino, Walker, Minnesota, U.S.	
48	Loss	28–17–3	Attila Levin	UD	10	Sep 8, 2002	35 years, 264 days	Great Plains Coliseum, Lawton, Oklahoma, U.S.	
47	Loss	28–16–3	Timo Hoffmann	UD	12	Jun 1, 2002	35 years, 165 days	Nuernberg Arena, Nürnberg, Bayern, Germany	For IBF Inter-Continental heavyweight title
46	Loss	28–15–3	Vitali Klitschko	TKO	11 (12), 1:16	Dec 8, 2001	34 years, 355 days	Koenig Pilsener Arena, Oberhausen, Nordrhein-Westfalen, Germany	For WBA Inter-Continental heavyweight title
45	Draw	28–14–3	Sedreck Fields	PTS	10	Sep 21, 2001	34 years, 277 days	Sport Palace Yunusabad, Tashkent, Uzbekistan	
44	Win	28–14–2	Ronnie Smith	TKO	4 (8), 1:26	Nov 4, 2000	33 years, 322 days	Music Hall, Austin, Texas, U.S.	
43	Loss	27–14–2	Eliecer Castillo	UD	10	Aug 20, 2000	33 years, 246 days	Casino Queen, East Saint Louis, Missouri, U.S.	
42	Draw	27–13–2	Frankie Swindell	SD	10	Jan 14, 2000	33 years, 27 days	Don Haskins Center, El Paso, Texas, U.S.	
41	Win	27–13–1	Louis Monaco	PTS	8	Apr 22, 1999	32 years, 125 days	Adam’s Mark Hotel, Tulsa, Oklahoma, U.S.	
40	Win	26–13–1	Lorenzo Boyd	TKO	3 (6)	Mar 23, 1999	32 years, 97 days	KC Market Center, Kansas City, Missouri, U.S.	
39	Win	25–13–1	Wladimir Klitschko	TKO	11 (12), 0:18	Dec 5, 1998	31 years, 352 days	Sport Palace, Kiev, Ukraine	Won WBC Inter-Continental heavyweight title
38	Win	24–13–1	Mark Hulstrom	KO	2 (6)	Nov 6, 1998	31 years, 323 days	K.B. Hallen, Copenhagen, Denmark	
37	Loss	23–13–1	Chris Byrd	UD	10	Jul 14, 1998	31 years, 208 days	Casino Magic, Bay Saint Louis, Mississippi, U.S.	
36	Loss	23–12–1	Larry Donald	UD	10	Apr 21, 1998	31 years, 124 days	Players Island Casino, Lake Charles, Louisiana, U.S.	
35	Loss	23–11–1	Corrie Sanders	UD	12	Nov 15, 1997	30 years, 332 days	Carousel Casino, Hammanskraal, Gauteng, South Africa	For vacant WBU heavyweight title
34	Win	23–10–1	Joe Hipp	KO	10 (10), 1:43	Jun 15, 1997	30 years, 179 days	Grand Casino, Biloxi, Mississippi, U.S.	
33	Win	22–10–1	Calvin Jones	TKO	5 (?)	Apr 17, 1997	30 years, 120 days	Adam’s Mark Hotel, Tulsa, Oklahoma, U.S.	
32	Win	21–10–1	Jorge Luis González	TKO	7 (10), 2:28	Dec 5, 1996	29 years, 353 days	Brady Theater, Tulsa, Oklahoma, U.S.	
31	Win	20–10–1	Lionel Jackson	KO	1 (?)	Sep 14, 1996	29 years, 271 days	Matte Sports Arena, Tulsa, Oklahoma, U.S.	
30	Win	19–10–1	Michael Seals	TKO	2 (?)	Sep 3, 1996	29 years, 260 days	Memphis, Tennessee, U.S.	
29	Loss	18–10–1	Michael Grant	UD	10	Jul 21, 1996	29 years, 216 days	Teamster's Hall, Baltimore, Maryland, U.S.	
28	Loss	18–9–1	Hasim Rahman	UD	10	Mar 26, 1996	29 years, 99 days	Blue Cross Arena, Rochester, New York, U.S.	
27	Win	18–8–1	Ron Brooks	TKO	1 (8)	Mar 2, 1996	29 years, 75 days	Civic Center, Sanford, Connecticut, U.S.	
26	Win	17–8–1	Stan Jones	KO	3 (8)	Sep 23, 1995	28 years, 279 days	Kissimmee, Florida, U.S.	
25	Win	16–8–1	Andre Smiley	TKO	1 (8), 0:52	Aug 26, 1995	28 years, 251 days	Argosy Riverboat, Kansas City, Missouri, U.S.	
24	Win	15–8–1	Cedric Harbaugh	DQ	3 (?)	Aug 22, 1995	28 years, 247 days	Civic Center, Raleigh, North Carolina, U.S.	
23	Win	14–8–1	Andre Smiley	TKO	1 (?)	Aug 18, 1995	28 years, 243 days	Ciudad Juarez, Chihuahua, Mexico	
22	Win	13–8–1	Tom Williams	TKO	1 (?)	Jul 25, 1995	28 years, 219 days	Columbia, South Carolina, U.S.	
21	Win	12–8–1	Lamar Johnson	TKO	3 (6)	Jul 18, 1995	28 years, 212 days	Civic Center, Raleigh, North Carolina, U.S.	
20	Win	11–8–1	Tyrone Dixon	KO	1 (?)	Jun 22, 1995	28 years, 186 days	Virginia Beach, Virginia, U.S.	
19	Win	10–8–1	Max Key	TKO	2 (?)	Apr 26, 1995	28 years, 129 days	Raleigh, North Carolina, U.S.	
18	Win	9–8–1	Ron Gullette	TKO	4 (?)	Feb 17, 1995	28 years, 61 days	Raleigh, North Carolina, U.S.	
17	Draw	8–8–1	Tommy Morrison	SD	10	Jul 28, 1994	27 years, 222 days	Convention Center, Atlantic City, New Jersey, U.S.	
16	Loss	8–8	Kirk Johnson	UD	6	May 5, 1994	27 years, 138 days	Olympic Auditorium, Los Angeles, California, U.S.	
15	Win	8–7	Derrick Roddy	UD	6	Mar 27, 1994	27 years, 99 days	Expo Square Pavilion, Tulsa, Oklahoma, U.S.	
14	Win	7–7	Jason Williams	UD	4	Mar 12, 1994	27 years, 84 days	MGM Grand, Grand Garden Arena, Las Vegas, Vegas, U.S.	
13	Loss	6–7	Brian Nielsen	UD	6	Mar 5, 1994	27 years, 77 days	Olympic Auditorium, Los Angeles, California, U.S.	
12	Loss	6–6	Will Hinton	UD	6	Aug 5, 1993	26 years, 230 days	Aladdin Hotel & Casino, Las Vegas, Nevada, U.S.	
11	Win	6–5	Juan Ramon Perez	KO	4 (?)	Apr 3, 1992	25 years, 107 days	Ciudad Juarez, Chihuahua, Mexico	
10	Win	5–5	Mike Bardwell	KO	2 (?)	Mar 25, 1992	25 years, 98 days	Sports Arena, San Diego, California, U.S.	
9	Loss	4–5	King Ipitan	UD	4	Feb 25, 1992	25 years, 69 days	Country Club, Reseda, California, U.S.	
8	Loss	4–4	Derek Isaman	UD	4	Feb 24, 1991	24 years, 68 days	Bally's Las Vegas, Las Vegas, Nevada, U.S.	
7	Win	4–3	Jose Avila	TKO	1 (?), 0:32	Feb 3, 1991	24 years, 47 days	El Paso Convention Center, El Paso, Texas, U.S.	
6	Loss	3–3	John Sargent	UD	6	Jan 6, 1991	24 years, 19 days	Civic Center, Bismarck, North Dakota, U.S.	
5	Loss	3–2	Aleksandr Miroshnichenko	RTD	6 (8)	Oct 29, 1990	23 years, 315 days	Korakuen Hall, Tokyo, Japan	
4	Win	3–1	Troy Tutwiler	TKO	3 (?)	Jun 10, 1990	23 years, 174 days	Sunland Park, New Mexico, U.S.	
3	Win	2–1	Sergio Hernandez	TKO	1 (4)	Jan 15, 1990	23 years, 28 days	Sunland Park, New Mexico, U.S.	
2	Loss	1–1	Cleveland Woods	TKO	1 (4), 2:31	Jun 27, 1989	22 years, 191 days	Showboat Hotel & Casino, Las Vegas, Nevada, U.S.	
1	Win	1–0	Sergio Araujo	KO	1 (4)	May 29, 1989	22 years, 162 days	County Coliseum, El Paso, Texas, U.S.	

Preceded by Wladimir Klitschko	WBC International Heavyweight Champion; December 5, 1998 – March 18, 2000; Vacated	Vacant Title next held by Wladimir Klitschko
