= Bobby Quarry =

American boxer

Personal information
- Nickname: Bobby “The Scientist” Quarry
- Born: Robert Neil Quarry; November 20, 1962 (age 63) Lynwood, California, U.S.
- Height: 6 ft 0 in (183 cm)
- Weight: Heavyweight

Boxing career
- Stance: Orthodox

Boxing record
- Total fights: 24
- Wins: 10
- Win by KO: 7
- Losses: 12
- Draws: 2
- No contests: 0

Robert Neil Quarry (born November 20, 1962), known as Bobby Quarry, is a former boxer and the youngest brother of James, Jerry and Mike Quarry.

Bobby Quarry was born in Lynwood, California, and is the last surviving brother of the four Quarry brothers, three of whom were noted boxers.

Quarry boxed professionally from 1982 to 1992, amassing a record of 10–12–2. His best-known fight was in 1992, when he faced Tommy Morrison in a Las Vegas match televised on ESPN. Morrison knocked Quarry out in the second round. Quarry won only one of his last nine bouts, a televised, one-punch knockout of Dave Kilgour, whom Quarry outweighed by 28 pounds.

Quarry retired at 29.
