= Tommy Morrison =

American boxer (1969–2013)

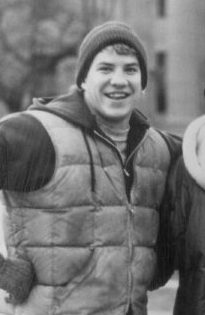
- Morrison in 1990
- Born: January 2, 1969; Gravette, Arkansas, U.S.
- Died: September 1, 2013 (aged 44); Omaha, Nebraska, U.S.
- Nickname: The Duke; The Machine
- Height: 6 ft 2 in (188 cm)
- Weight: Heavyweight
- Reach: 76 in (193 cm)
- Style: Orthodox
- Years active: 1988–1996, 2007–2008 (boxing); 2007, 2009 (MMA)

Professional boxing record
- Total: 52
- Wins: 48
- By knockout: 42
- Losses: 3
- Draws: 1

Mixed martial arts record
- Total: 1
- Wins: 1
- By knockout: 1
- Losses: 0

Tommy David Morrison (January 2, 1969 – September 1, 2013) was an American professional boxer and mixed martial artist who competed from 1988 to 2009. Best known for having a great left hook and formidable punching power along with a weak chin, Morrison won the vacant World Boxing Organization heavyweight world title in 1993 with a unanimous decision victory over a 44-year-old George Foreman. He lost the title in his second defense to Michael Bentt that same year. The other major lowlight of Morrison's boxing career was his fight with Ray Mercer in 1991 in which Morrison was knocked out after receiving 18 unanswered punches. In 1995, he won the minor International Boxing Council heavyweight world title when he defeated Donovan Ruddock by technical knockout (TKO).

Morrison is also known for his acting career, having co-starred alongside Sylvester Stallone in the 1990 film Rocky V as the Oklahoma boxer Tommy Gunn. Morrison's inability to take a good punch led to him being knocked down 13 times from October 1991 to October 1995, including being knocked down by a jab by Lennox Lewis in October 1995. Morrison made a brief comeback to boxing in 2007 and 2008 after the Nevada commission lifted his indefinite worldwide suspension for previously testing HIV-positive. In 2009 he briefly competed as a mixed martial artist as he scored a first-round knockout win over Corey Williams in his final professional fighting match.

On September 1, 2013, Morrison died at the age of 44 of complications related to AIDS. His son James McKenzie Witt was diagnosed with stage 4 stomach cancer in August 2026.

== Early life and amateur career ==
Morrison was born in Gravette, Arkansas. His mother, Diana, was of Native American (half Ponca and half Otoe) ancestry, and his father Tim was a white southerner of Scottish ancestry. Morrison was raised in Delaware County, Oklahoma, spending most of his teenage years in Jay. His nickname, "The Duke", is based on the false claim that he was a grand-nephew (or otherwise distant relative) of the Hollywood star John Wayne (né Marion Morrison), nicknamed "Duke". Tommy's father urged him to take up boxing in the 1970s. When Tommy was 15 years old, his mother used a fake ID and entered her son into a "toughman" contest (the minimum age for contestants was 18). He later told The New York Times that he lost only one of these matches.

After graduating from high school in 1988, Morrison received a partial football scholarship to the NCAA Division II program Emporia State University. In the same year, Morrison won the Regional Heavyweight Title – Kansas City Golden Gloves from Donald Ellis and advanced to the National Golden Gloves in Omaha, Nebraska, where he decisioned Javier Alvarez in the preliminaries, decisioned Warren Williams in the quarterfinals, but lost a split decision to Derek Isaman in the semifinals. Two weeks later, Morrison took part in the Western Olympic trials in Houston, Texas, defeating Robert Hargrove by a 4–1 majority decision in the semifinals, and John Bray by a 5–0 unanimous decision in the finals, and qualifying for the nationals, and garnering the "Outstanding Fighter" award of the tournament. Two weeks after that, fighting out of Republic, Missouri, at the National Olympic Trials in Concord, California, July 6, 1988, Morrison lost a 0–5 unanimous decision to Ray Mercer, who went on to win the gold medal at the Seoul Olympics. (They also had a prior match-up scheduled to be held June 16, 1988, at the Felt Forum in New York City, but it is not known why it did not take place.)

As an amateur, Morrison claimed 222 fights (most of which were local unsanctioned match-ups), with the 1988 Olympic Trials being the top of his amateur career. He said his unsanctioned amateur record was 202 wins, 20 losses, with many of the matches being one-round Toughman matches.

== Professional career ==
=== Early career ===
Morrison started his professional boxing career on November 10, 1988, with a first-round knockout of William Muhammad in New York City. Three weeks later, he scored another first-round knockout. On June 11, 1989, Morrison's camp arranged a fight with a boxer who was HIV positive named Richard "Ricky" Nelson. Nelson later died of AIDS-related complications on March 21, 1990. Morrison was not told about this when he fought this opponent. Morrison fought numerous fights after the Nelson fight and was tested and did not get HIV from his fight with Nelson. In 1989, Morrison had 19 wins and 0 losses, 15 by knockout. That same year, actor Sylvester Stallone, after watching one of Morrison's bouts, arranged a script reading, and cast Morrison in the movie Rocky V as Tommy "The Machine" Gunn, a young and talented protege of the retired Rocky Balboa. Morrison took a six-month break from boxing to work on the movie in 1990. From December 8, 1989, until June 8, 1990, Morrison did not compete in a boxing match, due to injuries and his involvement in Rocky V. In 1991, Morrison won four bouts, including notable victories against opponents James Tillis, the first man to take Mike Tyson the distance, and former WBC heavyweight champion Pinklon Thomas.

==== Morrison vs. Mercer ====
Morrison was then given an opportunity to face fellow undefeated fighter Ray Mercer, the WBO heavyweight world title holder, in a Pay Per View card held on October 18, 1991. The fight was a matchup between two undefeated, up-and-coming heavyweights. The bout had been scheduled for August 9, but Morrison withdrew due to an injury.

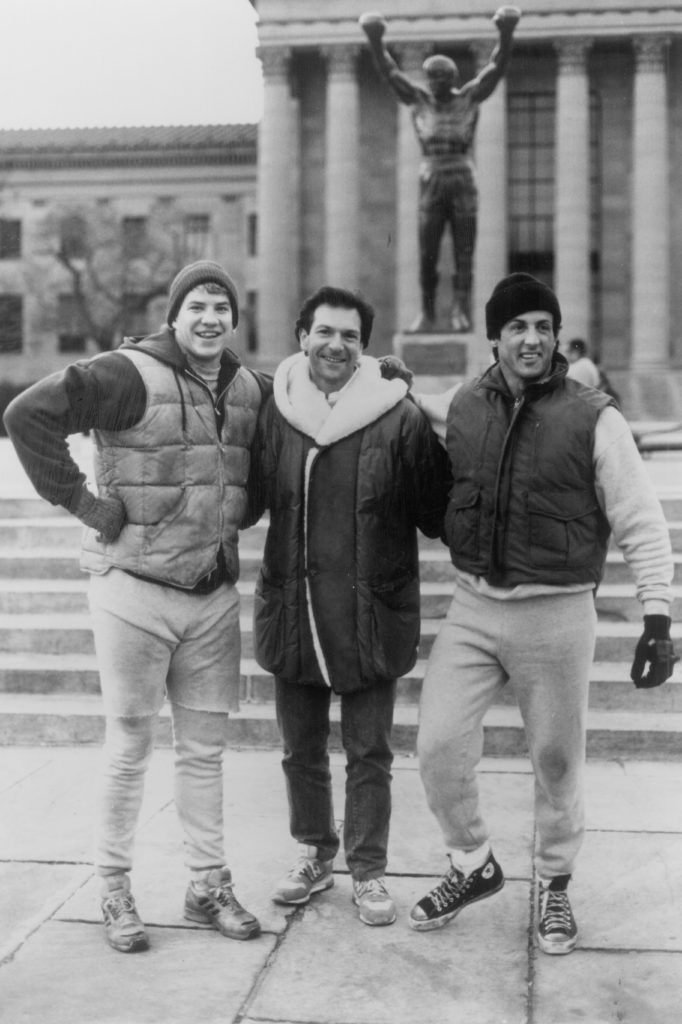
Tommy Morrison (on left), Steve Lott and Sylvester Stallone on June 6, 1990

Morrison got off to a great start, outboxing a sluggish Mercer through the first three rounds en route to taking all three rounds on all three of the judge's scorecards. Mercer would end the fight only 28 seconds into the fifth round. With Morrison backed up into the corner, Mercer was able to land a 15–punch combination. Clearly hurt from the exchange, Morrison slumped against the ropes, but the referee allowed Mercer to land several more punishing blows to a defenseless Morrison before ending the fight. Morrison suffered the first loss of his career, losing by 5th-round knockout.

=== Career from 1991–1993 ===
He had six wins in 1992, including fights with Art Tucker and Joe Hipp, who later became the first Native American to challenge for the world heavyweight title. In the Hipp fight, held June 19, 1992, Morrison was suffering from what was later discovered to be a broken hand and broken jaw, but rallied to score a knockout in the ninth round.

=== WBO heavyweight world champion ===
==== Morrison vs. Foreman ====
After two wins in 1993, including one over two-time world title challenger Carl "The Truth" Williams, Morrison found himself fighting for the WBO world title again, against heavyweight boxing legend George Foreman. Though the bout was promoted as a match between two of boxing's hardest punchers, neither fighter scored a knockdown nor had their opponent in any real danger. Morrison chose to avoid brawling with Foreman and spent the fight boxing from long range. He was able to hit and move effectively in this manner. Morrison won the bout in a lopsided unanimous decision with two scores of 117–110 and one score of 118–109, which resulted in him becoming the new WBO heavyweight world champion in the process.

==== Morrison vs. Tomashek ====
Originally, Morrison's first world title defense was scheduled against his Rocky V co-star Mike Williams in August 1993. Williams ultimately withdrew on the night of the fight, so Tim Tomashek stood in as a replacement. Tomashek had been selected as an alternate. Tomashek had been drinking before the bout, not believing Williams to have really backed out. Though Tomashek gave a good account of himself, reeling off a combination en route to winning the first round on the judges cards, Morrison fought conservatively but dropped his opponent with a multi-punch combination, and the fight was stopped by Tomashek's corner after only four rounds due to him walking to the wrong corner after his brutal punishment by Morrison. The WBO was later said to have rescinded their sanctioning of this fight due to Tomashek's lack of experience, but this was later confirmed to have been a rumor as fight records show the fight remained a bonafide title bout.

==== Morrison vs. Bentt ====
Almost immediately, talks of a fight with World Boxing Council champion Lennox Lewis began for reestablishing him as one of the top heavyweight contenders. Morrison then agreed to the lucrative WBC title shot against Lewis, that would see Lewis make the fourth defense of his title against Morrison, with both men evenly splitting a $16 million purse. However, Morrison's camp first chose to take a tuneup bout against the virtually unknown Michael Bentt before facing Lewis. The decision would prove to be unwise as Bentt brutalized Morrison during their fight, knocking him down three times 97 seconds into the first round in front of a live HBO Boxing audience, after which the fight was stopped and Bentt was named the winner. The loss cost Morrison his title shot against Lewis, as well as a reported $7.5 million that he was to earn in the Lewis fight.

=== Career from 1994–1996 ===
Morrison recovered by winning three bouts in a row in 1994, but his last fight of the year, against Ross Puritty, ended with a draw, before he landed a WBO heavyweight title fight against Herbie Hide on the infamous "High Noon in Hong Kong" card, but the event was cancelled at the last minute due to financial issues. Morrison won three fights in 1995 before meeting former #1 contender Razor Ruddock for the minor IBC heavyweight title.

==== Morrison vs. Ruddock ====
Ruddock dropped Morrison to his knees in the first round, but Morrison recovered to force a standing count in round two and compete on even terms for five rounds. Both fighters continued to trade power punches in rounds three and four, but Ruddock took control in round five, hurting Morrison with several left hooks and keeping him at bay with his jab. In the sixth round, Ruddock hurt Morrison with a quick combination, but just as it seemed Morrison was in trouble, he countered with a tremendous hook that put Ruddock on the canvas. Ruddock regained his feet, but Morrison drove him to the ropes and showered him with an extended flurry of blows. Just as the bell was about to sound, the referee stepped in and declared Morrison the winner by TKO.

==== Morrison vs. Lewis ====
Following his victory over Ruddock, Morrison was scheduled to meet former Undisputed Heavyweight Champion Riddick Bowe for Bowe's WBO Heavyweight title, but Bowe pulled out after obtaining a more lucrative fight with Evander Holyfield. Shortly after the cancellation of the Bowe–Morrison fight, Lewis and Morrison were able to reach an agreement to face one another during the fall of 1995 in Atlantic City, New Jersey which would see Morrison defending the IBC belt he won from his fight with Ruddock. The much-anticipated fight with Lewis, who had also lost his world championship, was finally about to take place. In it, Morrison was stopped in the sixth round. Morrison was knocked down once in the second round, once in the fifth round, and twice in the fourth round. The referee Mills Lane stopped the fight with Morrison on his feet after being knocked down for the fourth time. Lane pointed at Morrison's closed eye as a partial reason for the stoppage. Both fighters fought a conservative first round with neither man establishing much power-wise, but Lewis was able to effectively and efficiently use his signature left-jab to keep Morrison on the defensive and had little trouble with Morrison from the second round onwards. Morrison suffered a 36 stitch cut to his right eye.

=== Retirement ===
In February 1996, in the hours before a scheduled bout against Arthur Weathers, the Nevada Athletic Commission determined that Morrison had tested positive for HIV, suspending Morrison from boxing in Nevada. Several days later, Morrison's physician administered a test - but the test result has never been produced, which was allegedly positive. At a news conference on February 15, 1996, Morrison said he had contracted HIV because of a "permissive, fast and reckless lifestyle." Morrison stated that he would "absolutely" never fight again.

At another news conference on September 19, 1996, in Tulsa, Oklahoma, Morrison announced he wished to fight "one last time" when he could find an opponent, the proceeds of which would benefit his KnockOut AIDS Foundation. A spokesman for the Oklahoma Professional Boxing Advisory Board said Morrison would probably not be permitted to fight in Oklahoma because of his Nevada suspension. Morrison was given an opportunity for a final bout. By invitation of George Foreman, Morrison traveled to Japan in November 1996, to fight on the undercard, headlined by Foreman himself of his title defense of his Lineal title and WBU championship against Crawford Grimsley. Morrison was allowed to fight as anyone who was HIV positive was not prohibited from fighting in the boxing sport within Japan. However, the bout was agreed to be stopped if Morrison received a cut. Morrison won against Marcus Rhode by TKO, at less than two minutes of the first round. Morrison never received payment for this fight.

Despite his suspension, scoring a victory over Rhode, Morrison, despite not willing to go forward with a comeback beyond the bout, did voice his desire to possibly rematch Foreman; a mutual desire Foreman reciprocated, even defending the junior Morrison from the negative media surrounding his diagnosis. Had this bout been put together, Morrison would have challenged for the Lineal heavyweight championship (a title Foreman had held since 1994 when he upset Michael Moorer). However the bout never materialized, and Foreman retired the following year while Morrison stayed retired.

=== Comeback ===
In 2007, Morrison began fighting again having tested negative for HIV several times that year, after a decade away from the ring. After passing medical tests in Texas, West Virginia licensed Morrison to fight in that state, so in February of that year he fought and beat John Castle by a second round TKO, knocking him down in round two with his signature left hook.

==== Morrison vs Weisharr ====
In February 2008, Morrison was cleared to fight a young and undefeated fighter, Matt Weishaar, 3–0–2 (1 KO), in Leon, Mexico, on the undercard of Marco Antonio Rubio vs. Jose Luis Zertuche. Morrison's age and ring rust were very prominent in the bout, as he nearly stumbled over in round 2, but defended well and retained sharp powerful punches that shook his junior opponent. Weisharr took the first round on the cards with his jab keeping Tommy off the attack, but Morrison defeated Weisharr by third round TKO, after Weishaar was beginning to be overwhelmed by Morrison's powerful punches and accurately placed blows to the head beginning in the third, leading to the ref waving off the fight after a hard left hook and right cross.

==== Licensing and cancelled bouts in Texas and Montreal ====
Following his win over Castle, in April 2007, Morrison passed an additional medical test to be cleared to fight and licensed to fight in the state of Texas. He was scheduled to fight 28 year old Dale Ortiz (3–1) at Grand Plaza Hotel in Houston. Due to a paper work issue, not arriving before the date of the fight, Morrison was pulled from the event card.

Morrison reapplied for a boxing license in several jurisdictions. He got licensed to fight in the state of Washington in August 2010; although no bouts materialized from this.

In January 2011, the RACJ, the boxing commission for the province of Quebec, required that Morrison take a supervised HIV test in advance of a scheduled 2011 fight against Eric Barrak (3–0). Morrison invited the Quebec commission to attend a public test, but the commission did not come. Morrison stated that if Quebec refused to license him, he would "take the dog and pony show somewhere else." Following this, Tommy confirmed he was retired for good in an interview of August 2011 as he discussed his career and health. The fight took place in Montreal however with Matt Weishar, who had previously been the formers opponent, replacing Tommy and Tommy in his corner as his cornerman.

==== Muay Thai Bout ====
Morrison passed another HIV test and fought a modified Muay Thai bout against professional Corey "WizKid" Williams as the main event of the Ultimate Explosion 12: The Last Stand MMA and Boxing fight card on January 31, 2009 for the Wyoming state heavyweight title. The bout was unable to be sanctioned as a boxing match for the state of Wyoming did not possess an athletic commission at the time. As Williams utilized knees and boxing whilst Morrison clinched and boxed, he defeated his opponent by KO at one minute and fifty-eight seconds in the first round. The fight was instead an exhibition sanctioned by the Warrior Rage Kickboxing Federation. The fight was Morrison's final bout in combat sports.

== Mixed Martial Arts ==
After resuming his boxing career, Morrison announced his MMA debut. Although he never intended to pursue mixed martial arts full-time, he stands alongside Ray Mercer, as one of the few former heavyweight boxing champions to achieve measurable success in the sport.

On June 9, 2007, Morrison got into the cage with John Stover, a 340 pound fighter with a 7–2 record on the undercard fights of World Fighting Championships: Rumble in the Red Rocks. He did not need a license to fight as the location was outside the Arizona state jurisdiction, and Stover agreed to the match when it was shown to him that his opponent was allegedly HIV negative. Stover was under restrictions not able to knee, kick, or grapple, and bout was reduced to modified striking match, with boxing and elbows the only types remaining, and Muay Thai practices not involving the lower body remaining. After being pushed into the cage twice and some struggling with Stover throwing a number of ineffectual right hands and a left elbow, Morrison won in the first round by TKO after breaking Stover's nose with an overhand right at just over two minutes into the round. Due to the modified stand-up rules, the fight was to be "not considered a mixed martial arts contest," so instead was billed an exhibition fight and did not count towards Morrison's professional MMA record.

== Personal life ==
At one point in 1996, Morrison was married to two women at the same time: Dawn Freeman and to Dawn Gilbert. He married Dawn Freeman in March 1996 in Las Vegas, Nevada. The marriage ended in divorce in 2000, about eight months after Morrison was sentenced to an Arkansas prison. He married Dawn Gilbert in a marriage ceremony in Mexico in 1996. That marriage was annulled in 1998. Morrison had two sons, Trey Lippe-Morrison and James McKenzie Witt. There is a false claim that Tristan Brady is his biological son. However, Tristan is the son of Dawn Gilbert and Barry Brady. Gilbert married deceased firefighter Barry Brady three years after Morrison's initial HIV diagnosis.

=== Health ===
In 2006, Morrison said his HIV tests had been false positives. The Nevada commission's medical advisory board reviewed Morrison's 1996 test results and concluded they were "ironclad and unequivocal." Morrison said he tried to get a copy of the original test result but was unable to do so, adding: "I don't think it ever existed." Dr. Margaret Goodman said Morrison could "contact the laboratory, and they would immediately release the results to him." The results were provided in a court case in 2014 for the first time to the commission.

Morrison tested negative for HIV four times in January 2007. On July 22, 2007, the New York Times reported that Morrison took two HIV tests in 2007 and a third specifically for the Times. Ringside doctors, including Nevada's chief ringside physician, implied that the negative results were not based on Morrison's blood. Morrison's widow Trisha, filed a lawsuit in 2014 against the Nevada State Athletic Commission and Quest Diagnostics, the company that originally tested Morrison's blood in 1996.

=== Legal issues ===
In December 1993, Morrison was charged with assault and public intoxication when he allegedly punched a University of Iowa student in the back of the head while at Country Kitchen restaurant. Morrison said that the student had been staring at him. Morrison pleaded guilty and paid a $310 fine, but said he was innocent. In October 1996, Morrison pleaded guilty to transporting a loaded firearm in Jay, Oklahoma; he received a 6-month suspended sentence and a $100 fine. In 1997, an Oklahoma jury convicted him of DUI in an accident that left three people injured; the court ordered Morrison to spend time in treatment.

In September 1999, an Oklahoma court gave a two-year suspended sentence for a DUI elevated to felony level by his previous DUI conviction. On September 16, 1999, the police stopped Morrison for driving erratically and found drugs and weapons in his car, which resulted in various drugs and firearms charges. While awaiting trial on the September 16 charges, Morrison was again arrested on charges of intoxication and weapon possession while a felon in November 1999. On January 14, 2000, Morrison was sentenced to two years in prison on the September 16 charges. On April 3, 2002, he was sentenced to another year in prison after violating parole in Tulsa, Oklahoma, but was given credit for time previously served.

== Death ==
In August 2013, Morrison's mother, Diana, said that Tommy had "full-blown AIDS" and was "in his final days.". She also stated that Morrison had been bedridden for over a year.

On September 1, 2013, Morrison died at the Nebraska Medical Center in Omaha, Nebraska, at the age of 44. According to the Nebraska Department of Health & Human Services, Morrison's cause of death was cardiac arrest, resulting from multiorgan failure due to septic shock caused by a Pseudomonas aeruginosa infection. Morrison died 17 years and 7 months after his initial HIV diagnosis. Morrison's former agent Randy Lang stated in 2007 that Morrison still had HIV.

== Legacy ==
The World Boxing Organization said people would remember Morrison best for his dangerous punching power and especially his left hook. After his death, the International Boxing Hall of Fame said Morrison brought "so much excitement and energy to the heavyweight division in the 1990s".

ESPN released the 30 for 30 documentary "Tommy" in 2017. In the 90 minute documentary Morrison's career is explained and his former wives, friends, children, boxing opponents, boxing managers and trainers are interviewed.

Two-time heavyweight champion Pinklon Thomas said Morrison hit like a baseball bat and rated him ahead of Mike Tyson as the hardest puncher he had faced.

On May 23, 2023, Morrison was added to the boxing video game Undisputed, in the heavyweight division.

== Professional boxing record ==
52 fights	48 wins	3 losses
By knockout	42	3
By decision	6	0
Draws	1	

No.	Result	Record	Opponent	Type	Round, time	Date	Location	Notes
52	Win	48–3–1	Matt Weishaar	TKO	3 (6), 1:40	Feb 9, 2008	Domo de la Feria, León, Mexico	
51	Win	47–3–1	John Castle	TKO	2 (6), 1:49	Feb 22, 2007	Mountaineer Casino Racetrack and Resort, Chester, West Virginia, U.S.	
50	Win	46–3–1	Marcus Rhode	TKO	1 (10), 1:38	Nov 3, 1996	Tokyo Bay NK Hall, Urayasu, Japan	
49	Loss	45–3–1	Lennox Lewis	TKO	6 (12), 1:22	Oct 7, 1995	Convention Hall, Atlantic City, New Jersey, U.S.	Lost IBC heavyweight title
48	Win	45–2–1	Donovan Ruddock	TKO	6 (12), 2:55	Jun 10, 1995	Municipal Auditorium, Kansas City, Missouri, U.S.	Won vacant IBC heavyweight title
47	Win	44–2–1	Terry Anderson	KO	7 (10), 1:34	May 1, 1995	Brady Theater, Tulsa, Oklahoma, U.S.	
46	Win	43–2–1	Marselles Brown	KO	3 (10), 2:18	Mar 5, 1995	Civic Assembly Center, Muskogee, Oklahoma, U.S.	
45	Win	42–2–1	Ken Merritt	TKO	1 (10), 2:41	Feb 7, 1995	State Fair Arena, Oklahoma City, Oklahoma, U.S.	
44	Draw	41–2–1	Ross Puritty	SD	10	Jul 28, 1994	Convention Hall, Atlantic City, New Jersey, U.S.	
43	Win	41–2	Sherman Griffin	UD	10	May 24, 1994	Brady Theater, Tulsa, Oklahoma, U.S.	
42	Win	40–2	Brian Scott	TKO	2 (10), 1:37	Mar 27, 1994	Expo Square Pavilion, Tulsa, Oklahoma, U.S.	
41	Win	39–2	Tui Toia	KO	3 (10), 2:13	Feb 20, 1994	Belle Casino, Biloxi, Mississippi, U.S.	
40	Loss	38–2	Michael Bentt	TKO	1 (12), 1:33	Oct 29, 1993	Convention Center, Tulsa, Oklahoma, U.S.	Lost WBO heavyweight title
39	Win	38–1	Tim Tomashek	RTD	4 (12), 3:00	Aug 30, 1993	Kemper Arena, Kansas City, Missouri, U.S.	Retained WBO heavyweight title
38	Win	37–1	George Foreman	UD	12	Jun 7, 1993	Thomas & Mack Center, Paradise, Nevada, U.S.	Won vacant WBO heavyweight title
37	Win	36–1	Dan Murphy	TKO	3 (10), 1:10	Mar 30, 1993	Kemper Arena, Kansas City, Missouri, U.S.	
36	Win	35–1	Carl Williams	TKO	8 (10), 2:10	Jan 16, 1993	Convention Center, Reno, Nevada, U.S.	
35	Win	34–1	Marshall Tillman	TKO	1 (10), 2:23	Dec 12, 1992	America West Arena, Phoenix, Arizona, U.S.	
34	Win	33–1	Joe Hipp	TKO	9 (10), 2:47	Jun 27, 1992	Bally's, Reno, Nevada, U.S.	
33	Win	32–1	Art Tucker	TKO	2 (10), 1:12	May 14, 1992	Broadway by the Bay Theater, Atlantic City, New Jersey, U.S.	
32	Win	31–1	Kimmuel Odum	TKO	3 (10), 1:50	Apr 23, 1992	Foxwoods Resort Casino, Ledyard, Connecticut, U.S.	
31	Win	30–1	Jerry Halstead	TKO	5 (10), 0:30	Mar 20, 1992	Caesars Palace, Paradise, Nevada, U.S.	
30	Win	29–1	Bobby Quarry	TKO	2 (10), 1:29	Feb 16, 1992	Las Vegas Hilton, Winchester, Nevada, U.S.	
29	Loss	28–1	Ray Mercer	TKO	5 (12), 0:28	Oct 18, 1991	Convention Hall, Atlantic City, New Jersey, U.S.	For WBO heavyweight title
28	Win	28–0	Ladislao Mijangos	TKO	1 (10), 1:40	Jun 27, 1991	Bally's Las Vegas, Paradise, Nevada, U.S.	
27	Win	27–0	Yuri Vaulin	TKO	5 (10), 2:06	Apr 19, 1991	Convention Hall, Atlantic City, New Jersey, U.S.	
26	Win	26–0	Pinklon Thomas	RTD	1 (10), 3:00	Feb 19, 1991	Kemper Arena, Kansas City, Missouri, U.S.	
25	Win	25–0	James Tillis	TKO	1 (8), 1:51	Jan 11, 1991	Etess Arena, Atlantic City, New Jersey, U.S.	
24	Win	24–0	Mike Acey	TKO	1 (6), 1:35	Nov 8, 1990	Bally's Las Vegas, Paradise, Nevada, U.S.	
23	Win	23–0	John Morton	TKO	5 (6), 1:49	Oct 4, 1990	Etess Arena, Atlantic City, New Jersey, U.S.	
22	Win	22–0	Charles Woolard	KO	2	Jun 9, 1990	Memorial Hall, Kansas City, Kansas, U.S.	
21	Win	21–0	Ken Lakusta	UD	6	Dec 7, 1989	The Mirage, Paradise, Nevada, U.S.	
20	Win	20–0	Lorenzo Canady	UD	6	Nov 3, 1989	South Mountain Arena, West Orange, New Jersey, U.S.	
19	Win	19–0	Charles Hostetter	KO	1	Oct 26, 1989	Kemper Arena, Kansas City, Missouri, U.S.	
18	Win	18–0	Harry Terrell	KO	1 (6), 2:59	Oct 17, 1989	State Fair, Phoenix, Arizona, U.S.	
17	Win	17–0	David Jaco	KO	1 (6), 0:37	Sep 19, 1989	Veterans Memorial Coliseum, Jacksonville, Florida, U.S.	
16	Win	16–0	Rick Enis	TKO	1 (6), 2:45	Sep 5, 1989	Harrah's Lake Tahoe, Stateline, Nevada, U.S.	
15	Win	15–0	Jesse Shelby	TKO	2 (6), 1:55	Aug 22, 1989	Showboat, Atlantic City, New Jersey, U.S.	
14	Win	14–0	Mike Robinson	TKO	2 (6)	Aug 8, 1989	Bally's Park Place, Atlantic City, New Jersey, U.S.	
13	Win	13–0	Aaron Brown	UD	6	Jul 3, 1989	Atlantic City, New Jersey, U.S.	
12	Win	12–0	Steve Zouski	UD	4	Jun 25, 1989	Convention Hall, Atlantic City, New Jersey, U.S.	
11	Win	11–0	Ricky Nelson	TKO	2 (6)	Jun 11, 1989	Trump Plaza Hotel and Casino, Atlantic City, New Jersey, U.S.	
10	Win	10–0	Mike McGrady	TKO	1, 1:19	May 14, 1989	Trump Plaza Hotel and Casino, Atlantic City, New Jersey, U.S.	
9	Win	9–0	Lorenzo Boyd	TKO	2	Apr 22, 1989	Kansas City, Kansas, U.S.	
8	Win	8–0	Alan Jamison	KO	1	Mar 29, 1989	Wichita, Kansas, U.S.	
7	Win	7–0	Lee Moore	KO	2	Feb 24, 1989	Convention Hall, Atlantic City, New Jersey, U.S.	
6	Win	6–0	Traore Ali	TKO	4 (6), 0:53	Feb 9, 1989	Felt Forum, New York City, New York, U.S.	
5	Win	5–0	Mike Foley	KO	1	Jan 24, 1989	Four Seasons Arena, Great Falls, Montana, U.S.	
4	Win	4–0	Elvin Evans	KO	1	Jan 17, 1989	Premier Center, Sterling Heights, Michigan, U.S.	
3	Win	3–0	Joe Adams	KO	1	Jan 12, 1989	Oklahoma City, Oklahoma, U.S.	
2	Win	2–0	Tony Dewar	KO	1, 0:41	Nov 30, 1988	Cobo Hall, Detroit, Michigan, U.S.	
1	Win	1–0	William Muhammad	TKO	1 (4)	Nov 10, 1988	Felt Forum, New York City, New York, U.S.	

== Titles in boxing ==
Major World titles

- WBO heavyweight champion (200+ lbs)

Minor World titles

- IBC heavyweight champion (200+ lbs)

== Mixed martial arts record ==
=== Professional record ===
Professional record breakdown
1 match	1 win	0 losses
By knockout	1	0

Res.	Record	Opponent	Method	Event	Date	Round	Time	Location	Notes
Win	1–0	Corey Williams	KO (punch)	Ultimate Explosion 12: The Last Stand	Jan 31, 2009	1	1:58	Laramie, Wyoming, United States	Won Wyoming heavyweight title

=== Exhibition record ===
Professional record breakdown
1 match	1 win	0 losses
By knockout	1	0

Res.	Record	Opponent	Method	Event	Date	Round	Time	Location	Notes
Win	1–0	John Stover	TKO (punch)	WFC: Rumble in the Red Rocks	June 9, 2007	1	2:08	Camp Verde, Arizona, United States	MMA debut.

== Filmography ==
Year	Title	Role	Notes
1988	They Live	Dave, Resistance Fighter	Uncredited
1990	Rocky V	Tommy Gunn	
2026	I am Tommy Morrison	Himself	TV documentary – CFI Media

Rocky role
Previous: Dolph Lundgren	Main opponent actor 1990	Next: Antonio Tarver
Sporting positions
Minor world boxing titles
Vacant Title last held by Tim Puller	IBC heavyweight champion June 10, 1995 – October 7, 1995	Succeeded by Lennox Lewis
Major world boxing titles
Vacant Title last held by Michael Moorer	WBO heavyweight champion June 7, 1993 – October 29, 1993	Succeeded by Michael Bentt
Heavyweight status
Previous: Corrie Sanders	Latest born world champion to die September 1, 2013 – present	Incumbent
