= Derek Isaman =

American boxer (born 1967)

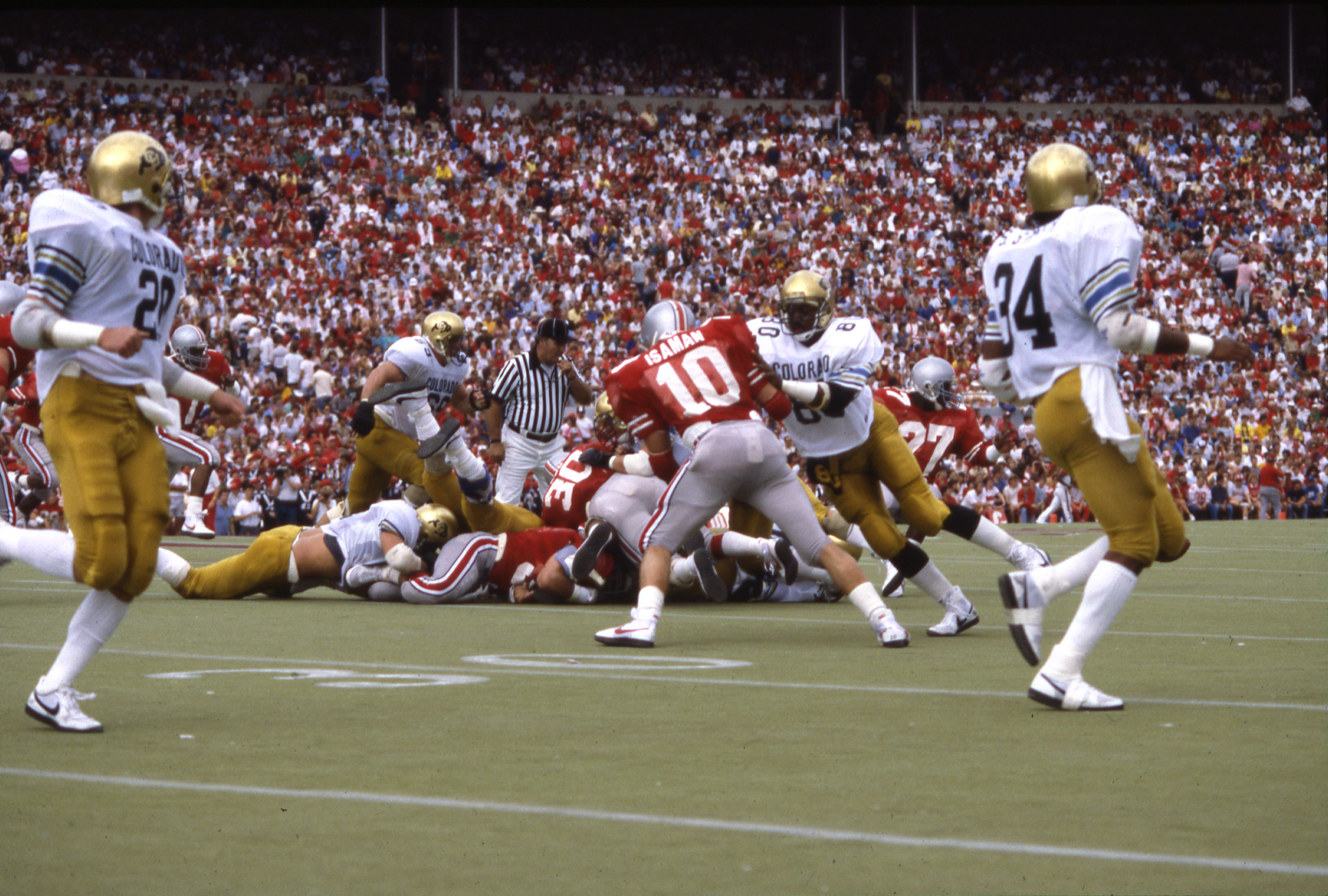
Isaman (#10) playing for the Ohio State Buckeyes in 1986

Derek Warren Isaman (born April 23, 1967) is an American former professional boxer. He fought Mike Tyson in a Golden Gloves semi-final at age 16, and went on to win the national Golden Gloves title in 1988. He was the alternate heavyweight boxer on the 1988 United States men's Olympic boxing team. Following a successful career as a linebacker for the Ohio State Buckeyes football team, he became a professional boxer.

== College football ==
Isaman played college football for the Ohio State Buckeyes, where he was the starting inside linebacker. He was the Most Valuable Player on the 1989 Ohio State football team.

== Amateur boxing career ==
Isaman was the 1988 National Golden Gloves Heavyweight champion, he decisioned James Johnson in the quarterfinals, Tommy Morrison in the semifinals, and Robert Hargrove in the finals. He also lost a points decision to Mike Tyson in a prior National Golden Gloves semi-final. He was the only boxer to fight Tyson and not get knocked out.

== Professional boxing career ==
Isaman turned pro in 1990 and won his first 12 fights, before losing a rematch to Marion Wilson in 1992. He retired in 1994 after a three fight win streak.

== Professional boxing record ==
15 Wins (9 knockouts, 6 decisions), 1 Loss (0 knockouts, 1 decision)
Result	Record	Opponent	Type	Round	Date	Location	Notes
Win	17-5	(United States) West Turner	PTS	8	08/11/1994	(United States) Mashantucket, Connecticut, U.S.	
Win	5-0-1	(United States) Tom Dailing	TKO	4	24/09/1994	(United States) Atlantic City, New Jersey, U.S.	
Win	10-38	(United States) Rocky Bentley	UD	8	01/08/1992	(United States) Columbus, Ohio, U.S.	
Loss	5-3-2	(United States) Marion Wilson	SD	6	14/05/1992	(United States) Atlantic City, New Jersey, U.S.	
Win	4-7	(United States) Sim Warrior	TKO	2	Mar 20, 1992	(United States) Las Vegas, Nevada, U.S.	
Win	13-40-2	(United States) Frankie Hines	KO	1	08/02/1992	(United States) Columbus, Ohio, U.S.	
Win	5-1-1	(United States) Marion Wilson	TD	2	09/08/1991	(United States) Atlantic City, New Jersey, U.S.	
Win	4-7	(United States) Warren Thompson	UD	4	20/06/1991	(United States) Atlantic City, New Jersey, U.S.	
Win	3-0	(United States) Webster Vinson	PTS	4	12/05/1991	(United States) Rochester, New York, U.S.	
Win	4-10-1	(United States) Mike Robinson	PTS	4	18/04/1991	(United States) Atlantic City, New Jersey, U.S.	
Win	1-4	(United States) Horace Craft	KO	1	17/03/1991	(United States) Las Vegas, Nevada, U.S.	Craft knocked out at 1:16 of the first round.
Win	4-3	(United States) Ross Puritty	PTS	4	24/02/1991	(United States) Las Vegas, Nevada, U.S.	
Win	2-6	(United States) Corey Coulter	TKO	1	10/02/1991	(United States) Atlantic City, New Jersey, U.S.	
Win	0-2-1	(United States) Jose Avila	KO	1	12/11/1990	(United States) Baton Rouge, Louisiana, U.S.	
Win	0-1	(United States) Roy Price	TKO	1	17/09/1990	(United States) Atlantic City, New Jersey, U.S.	
Win	0-2	(United States) Ed Strickland	KO	1	19/08/1990	(United States) Reno, Nevada, U.S.	
