= High Noon in Hong Kong =

Boxing card in Hong Kong

- Poster before the Padilla/Hale bout was dropped
- Date: 22 October 1994 (cancelled)
- Venue: Hong Kong Stadium, Hong Kong Island, British Hong Kong

Result
- Card cancelled

High Noon in Hong Kong was a World Boxing Organisation sanctioned boxing event. It was to feature four fights: a heavyweight title fight between Herbie Hide and Tommy Morrison; Steve Collins versus American Lonnie Beasley for the WBO middleweight title; Billy Schwer would challenge Rafael Ruelas for the IBF lightweight title, plus Frank Bruno vs. Ray Mercer in a non-title fight in the Hong Kong Stadium on 22 October 1994. It was cancelled at the last minute because of major financial problems.

== Beginning ==
According to British sports promoter Barry Hearn, he met John Daly, a Los Angeles-based Londoner, in June 1994, who asked him to provide boxers for the event. American boxing promoter Bob Arum was providing Tommy Morrison and Barry Hearn would provide Herbie Hide and Steve Collins. Mickey Duff and Jarvis Astaire provided Frank Bruno for a non-title fight with Ray Mercer, as well as Billy Schwer for the IBF lightweight title challenge against Rafael Ruelas.

The four-fight High Noon show at the Hong Kong Stadium was offered as pay-per-view with a cash flow estimated at US $2.3 million, expected from the American public.

== Cancellation ==
Barry Hearn withdrew his boxers, Herbie Hide and Steve Collins, when their purse guarantees were not in place by the deadline of 5:30 pm local time on Saturday. Bob Arum was the event's nominal promoter but refused to come up with the cash to save it. Daly tried to raise the money which, according to Arum, was around US $2m.

When the local bankers whom Daly thought had agreed to salvage the show refused to advance him a further US $771,000 against anticipated revenue from ticket sales and American pay-per-view subscriptions at US $25 each, Daly had no choice. He said that the boxers' purses were Arum's responsibility, which Arum did not agree with.

Daly had spent at least US $800,000 of his own money into it. "My end of the deal was kept," Daly argued. "I had to arrange the stadium, air fares and all the pre-fight promotional expenses, which I did, but the purses were not part of my obligation."

The 2,000-odd fight fans in Hong Kong who bought tickets, some worth a couple of thousand dollars, had yet to receive refunds a year later.

== Responses ==
Frank Bruno said: "I feel very let down by Bob Arum and the promoters. They were supposed to be top professionals, the creme de la creme. I thought they were the business, but to be quite honest they've been unprofessional, totally unprofessional."

"To cancel a promotion just like that without consulting anyone is very serious. A lot of money has been going into this. Top Rank are big promoters and they should have dug deep in their pockets - they've made enough money out of fighters over the years."

"It's tough for all the fighters, and for the people who worked five days a week to afford to come over here and support us. It's disgusting. It's staggering."

Mickey Duff, who plans to sue Arum and Top Rank on behalf of Bruno and Billy Schwer said: "What kind of promoters are these? I've been in the business 45 years and I've never cancelled a show just because I was going to lose money. I'd rather cut my throat than do that."

Barry Hearn said, "But to be honest I was very pleased with myself in Hong Kong. I stood my ground. How many others would have?"

== Planned card ==
| Weight Class | Weight | | vs. | | Notes |
|---|---|---|---|---|---|
| Heavyweight | 200+ lbs. | Herbie Hide | vs. | Tommy Morrison | ^{note 1} |
| Heavyweight | 200+ lbs. | Frank Bruno | vs. | Ray Mercer |
| Lightweight | 135 lbs. | Rafael Ruelas | vs. | Billy Schwer | ^{note 2} |
| Light Welterweight | 140 lbs. | Zack Padilla | vs. | Ross Hale | ^{note 3} |
| Super Middleweight | 154 lbs. | Steve Collins | vs. | Lonnie Beasley | ^{note 4} |

^Note 1 For WBO Heavyweight title
^Note 2 For IBF Lightweight title
^Note 3 For WBO Light Welterweight title, bout dropped following Padilla boxing license being suspended in August
^Note 4 For WBO Super Middleweight title
