= Michael Bentt =

American actor and boxer

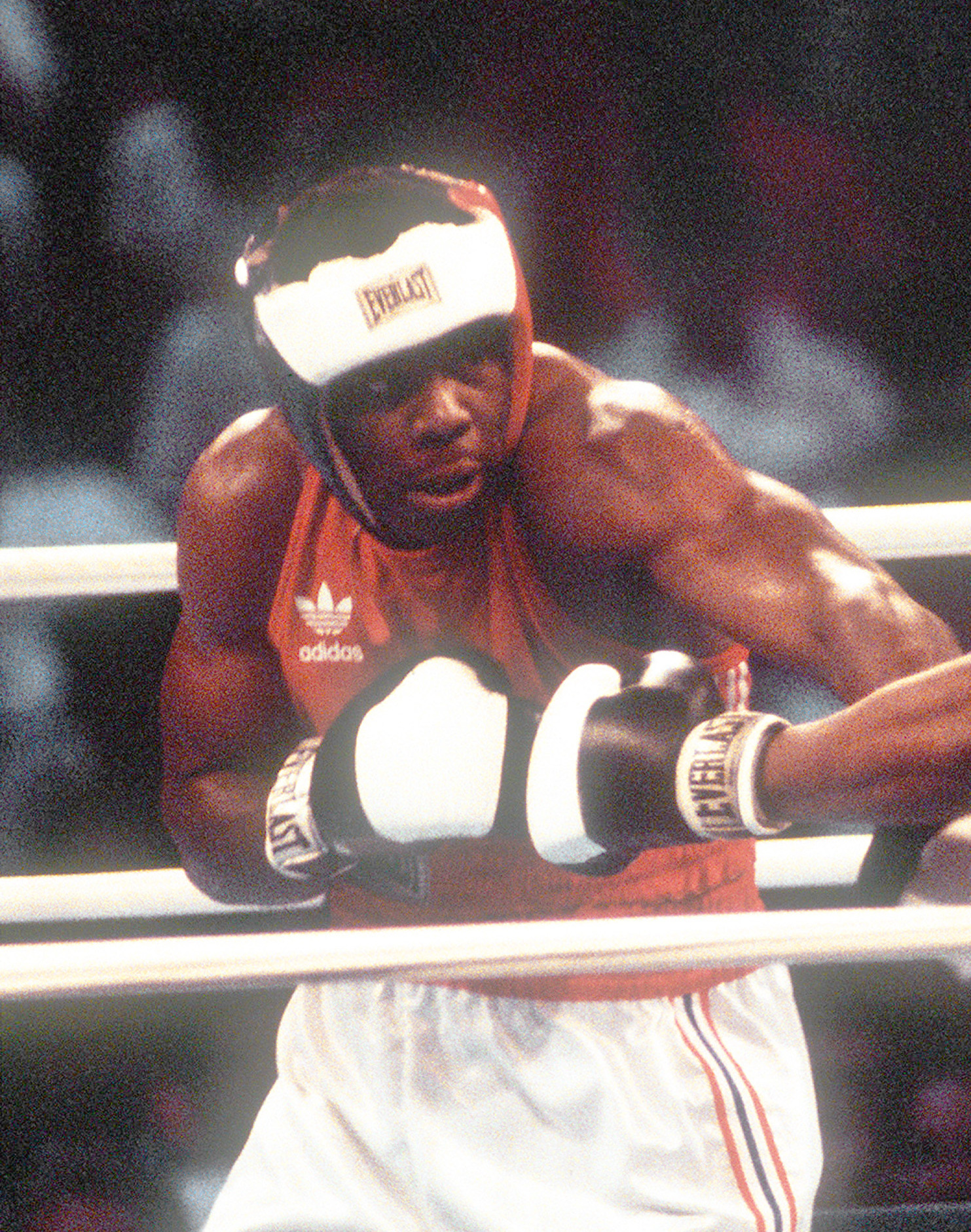
- Bentt at the 1987 Pan American Games

Personal information
- Nationality: American; British (jus solis)
- Born: September 4, 1965 (age 61) London, England
- Height: 6 ft 3 in (191 cm)
- Weight: Heavyweight

Boxing career
- Reach: 79 in (201 cm)
- Stance: Orthodox

Boxing record
- Total fights: 13
- Wins: 11
- Win by KO: 6
- Losses: 2
Medal record
Men's amateur boxing
Representing United States
North American Championships
Gold medal – first place	1985 Beaumont	Heavyweight
Silver medal – second place	1987 Toronto	Heavyweight
World Cup
Bronze medal – third place	1985 Seoul	Heavyweight
World Championships
Bronze medal – third place	1986 Reno	Heavyweight
Pan American Games
Bronze medal – third place	1987 Indianapolis	Heavyweight
Goodwill Games
Bronze medal – third place	1986 Moscow	Heavyweight

Michael Bentt (born September 4, 1965) is an American film and television actor, and former professional boxer who competed from 1989 to 1994. He was born in East Dulwich, London, but raised in the Cambria Heights section of Queens in New York City. Bentt won the WBO heavyweight world title from Tommy Morrison in 1993, losing the title in his first defense in 1994 to Herbie Hide.

As an amateur, he won bronze medals at the 1986 World Championships and 1987 Pan American Games. He currently has the shortest professional boxing career of any heavyweight world champion in history, for only 1,867 days spanning 5 years between 1989 and 1994.

As an actor, Bentt is best known for co-starring as Sonny Liston in the 2001 film Ali, and as Biggis/El Plaga in the 2005 film State Property 2. He is featured in the first episode of the 2019 American web television documentary series Losers.

== Amateur career ==
One of the most decorated amateur boxers in US history, Bentt won four New York City Golden Gloves titles, five United States Amateur Boxing Championships and three (New York State) Empire State Games gold medals. After having won the bronze medal at the 1986 World Amateur Boxing Championships and the 1987 Pan American Games he placed a controversial second-place finish at the 1988 United States Olympic Trials and Box-off's to the Seoul Olympics eventual gold medalist, Ray Mercer. Sport writers frequently misspelled his second name, writing "Bent" or "Bennet" instead of "Bentt," and after he defeated Tommy Morrison, HBO's host Larry Merchant ironized in a way that he's finally have to add the third "T" to his name.

As both his mother and father are Jamaican citizens, he won the right to fight on the Jamaican Olympic Boxing Team after stopping the island nation's top amateur heavyweights in the 1988 Jamaican Olympic Trials. However, when confronted with the provision that he would have to relinquish his United States citizenship in order to accompany the Jamaican team to Seoul, he refused. Bentt is regarded as the most decorated boxer in the history of American amateur boxing never to have competed on a United States Olympic boxing team.

His other amateur titles included the 1981 New York City Police Athletic League Champion, 1980 NYC Kids Gloves Champion, Empire State Games Heavyweight Champion (1982, 1983, 1984). He was a three-time selected member of the United States All-American National Boxing Team (1985, 1986, 1987), captain of the 1986 United States Goodwill Games Boxing Team and the 1987 United States Pan American Games Boxing Team. He was a bronze medalist in each of those competitions. At the Pan American semifinals and North American finals he faced Félix Savón, to whom he lost by unanimous decision twice in nine days, cutting his way to the 1987 World Cup in Belgrade. He also received the bronze medal at the 1985 World Amateur Championships in Seoul, South Korea and the gold medal at the 1985 North American Championship in Beaumont, Texas.

Though he didn't compete at the 1985 AAU National Championships, deciding to take some time off after losing a decision to Alexandr Yagubkin of the Soviet Union in the semifinals of the World Cup, he was the recipient of the 1985 Sugar Ray Robinson Award as the most outstanding boxer in the New York Golden Gloves tournament that year (among the 85' class of Golden Gloves champions were future professional champions Riddick Bowe, Kevin Kelly and Junior Jones). Bentt was also a three time member of the United States All-American Amateur Boxing Team. After winning the Pan American Box-offs he was ranked #1 U.S. amateur heavyweight by the United States Amateur Boxing Federation.

Bentt counts avenging an earlier defeat, suffered at the hands of, then, three-time USSR World Amateur Heavyweight Champion, Alexandr Yagubkin, at the 1986 World Championships in Reno, Nevada as one of his most precious moments. Before the loss to Bentt, Yagubkin had been victorious over every American heavyweight he encountered during a three-year period. This included a Moscow decision-win over Bentt's older brother Winston, himself a member of the United States National Team. Domestically Bentt went undefeated for a four-year period before being denied an Olympic team berth at the 1988 United States Olympic Trials.

In an homage to Stephan Johnson, a former amateur teammate at the Bed-Stuy famed (Bedford-Stuyvesant) Boxing Association and fellow Golden Glover who succumbed to injuries suffered in a professional boxing match in Atlantic City, New Jersey, Michael privately presented Stephan's mother with a pair of his own New York Golden Gloves champion medallions.

Although he was the officially selected team alternate at 201 lbs Bentt declined to serve as an alternate on the 1988 Olympic Boxing Team.

=== Highlights ===
AAU Region #2 Championships (heavyweight), Radisson Hotel, Wilmington, Delaware, October 1983:

- Lost to Henry Milligan by split decision, 2–3

Sweden–USA Duals (heavyweight), Stockholm, Sweden, January 1984:

- Defeated Jack Johnsen (Sweden) by unanimous decision, 3–0

Sweden–USA Duals (heavyweight), Gothenburg, Sweden, January 1984:

- Defeated Jack Johnsen (Sweden) by split decision, 2–1

FRG–USA Duals (heavyweight), Gothenburg, Sweden, January 1984:

- Defeated Constantin Varan (West Germany) by unanimous decision, 3–0

(gold) United States National Championships (heavyweight), Indianapolis, Indiana, November 1984:

- 1/2: Defeated Bruce Baldwin by unanimous decision, 5–0
- Finals: Defeated Orbit Pough RSC 3

USA–Canada Duals (heavyweight), Orlando, Florida, December 1984:

- Defeated Wade Parsons (Canada) by split decision, 2–1

USA–South Korea Duals (heavyweight), Las Vegas, Nevada, March 1985:

- Defeated Jang Han Kon (South Korea) RET 3

(gold) U.S. National Sports Festival (heavyweight), Baton Rouge, Louisiana, August 1985:

- 1/2: Defeated Michael Morrell RSC 1 (1:56)
- Finals: Defeated Orbit Pough by unanimous decision, 5–0

(gold) North American Championships (heavyweight), Beaumont, Texas, August 1985:

- Finals: Defeated Domenico D'Amico (Canada) by decision (D'Amico's cornermen entered the ring in the 3rd rd)

(bronze) World Cup (heavyweight), Seoul, South Korea, November 1985:

- 1/4: Defeated Ismail Khalil (Iraq) RSC 1
- 1/2: Lost to Alexandr Yagubkin (Soviet Union) by majority decision, 1–4

(gold) United States National Championships (heavyweight), Beaumont, Texas, April 1986:

- 1/8: Defeated Gregory Hayes RSC 1 (1:52)
- 1/4: Defeated Jonathon Littles RET 2 (3:00)
- 1/2: Defeated Orbit Pough by unanimous decision, 5–0
- Finals: Defeated Jerry Goff by unanimous decision, 5–0 (Goff was given a standing eight count in the 1st rd, was cut over the left eye in the 2nd rd, and suffered a broken nose in the 3rd rd)

World Champ Box-offs (heavyweight), Caesars Tahoe, Stateline, Nevada, April 1986:

- (no data available)

(bronze) World Championships (heavyweight), Sparks Convention Center, Reno, Nevada, May 1986:

- 1/8: Defeated Duke Okoromaye (Nigeria) RSCH 2 (0:58)
- 1/4: Defeated Alexandr Yagubkin (Soviet Union) by split decision, 3–2
- 1/2: Lost to Arnold Vanderlyde (Netherlands) by majority decision, 1–4

(bronze) Goodwill Games (heavyweight), Moscow, Soviet Union, July 1986:

- 1/4: Defeated Svilen Rusinov (Bulgaria) by split decision, 3–2
- 1/2: Lost to Vladimir Balay (Soviet Union) by majority decision, 1–4

USA–USSR Duals (heavyweight), Orlando, Florida, March 1987:

- Defeated Ramzan Sebiyev (Soviet Union) by split decision, 2–1

(gold) United States National Championships (heavyweight), Buffalo, New York, March–April 1987:

- 1/8: Defeated Danny Jones by unanimous decision, 5–0
- 1/4: Defeated Michael Morrell RSC 2
- 1/2: Defeated James Johnson RET 1 (1:03)
- Finals: Defeated Joseph Pemberton by unanimous decision, 5–0

(gold) U.S. Olympic Festival (heavyweight), Raleigh, North Carolina, July 1987:

- 1/2: Defeated Orbit Pough by split decision, 3–2
- Finals: Defeated Troy Baudoin RSC 3 (1:50)

Pan Am Box-offs (heavyweight), International Center of the Broadmoor, Colorado Springs, Colorado, July 1987:

- Defeated Orbit Pough

(bronze) Pan American Games (heavyweight), Indianapolis, Indiana, August 1987:

- 1/2: Lost to Félix Savón (Cuba) by unanimous decision, 0–5

(silver) North American Championships (heavyweight), Toronto, Canada, August 1987:

- Finals: Lost to Félix Savón (Cuba) by unanimous decision, 0–3 (Savón was given a standing eight count in the 1st rd)

Eastern Olympic Trials (heavyweight), Fayetteville, North Carolina, June 1988:

- 1/2: Defeated Timothy Igo RSC 1 (1:58)
- Finals: Defeated David Sewell by decision

Olympic Trials (heavyweight), Concord Pavilion, Concord, California, July 1988:

- 1/4: Defeated Jerry Goff by split decision, 3–2
- 1/2: Defeated Derek Isaman by majority decision, 4–1
- Finals: Lost to Ray Mercer by unanimous decision, 0–5 (Bentt was given a standing eight count in the 2nd rd; one point deducted from Bentt in the 3rd rd)

Olympic Box-offs (heavyweight), Caesars Palace, Las Vegas, Nevada, July 1988:

- Day 1: Lost to Ray Mercer by split decision, 2–3 (Bentt had his mouthpiece knocked off at 1:54 of the 1st rd; took 0:15 to replace)

Bentt finished his amateur career with a record of 148 wins, 8 losses (no stoppages.)

== Professional career ==
Bentt turned professional under Emanuel Steward; and was knocked-out in the first round by Jerry Jones in his pro debut. Bentt maintained that neither he nor Steward knew Jones was a southpaw but counts both the devastation and humiliation suffered that night as "hugely valuable and key" to his massive upset of Tommy Morrison some four years later. After a 20-month hiatus following the loss to Jones, Bentt returned to boxing. After a few wins he signed with manager Stan Hoffman, and was trained by former light heavyweight champion Eddie Mustafa Muhammad. Bentt then put together a modest winning streak, lost to Herbie Hide and retired with an 11–2 record.

For a two-year period in the early 1990s served as chief sparring partner for then world heavyweight champion Evander Holyfield.

In October 1993, Bentt caused a huge upset with a ninety seven second first-round knockout of Tommy Morrison to capture the WBO heavyweight championship. The American-based boxer lost his WBO belt to Herbie Hide at The Den, Bermondsey, United Kingdom, in 1994. The fight would be his last after being rushed to the hospital and told he could never fight again. Bentt had suffered brain injuries in the loss, and although the injuries did not negatively affect the quality of his thoughts or mental sharpness, it was feared that future impacts to the head could result in permanent long-term injury or even death.

At various times after relocating to numerous U.S. states, Bentt passed written exams and awaited entrance into police academies in New York City, Miami, Florida, and Las Vegas, Nevada

== Acting career and life after boxing ==
Bentt attended Northampton Community College in Bethlehem, Pennsylvania, where he studied radio/TV. Turning to acting, he was the second actor cast after Will Smith in Michael Mann's Ali. Michael landed the coveted role of Sonny Liston, while also serving as both Smith's chief sparring partner and assistant trainer during the six months of boxing training before principal photography began on the film.

Bentt has contributed essays as a writer for Bert Sugar's Fight Game and the HBO boxing website. He has commentated on boxing matches for Bob Arum's Top Rank Boxing on ESPN in the United States, Filmnet in The Netherlands, and BBC Radio in the United Kingdom.

In 2006, he had an on camera audition in Puerto Rico as part of HBO World Championship Boxing's search for an expert boxing commentator for the network's newest boxing segment. Eventually the candidates were narrowed down to Bentt and the then recently retired former Heavyweight Champion, Lennox Lewis.

In 2003, he was the first actor-in-residence at Northampton Community College in Pennsylvania, where he played the title role in 'Othello'.

He has worked with directors, Ron Shelton (twice), Clint Eastwood, Sylvester Stallone, Bill L. Norton (five times), and Michael Mann (five times); one of his notable Mann roles was in Public Enemies, starring Johnny Depp as John Dillinger. Mann handpicked Bentt to play Herbert Youngblood, who, along with Dillinger, staged the infamous Crown Point Jail break. He also starred as Biggis (El Plaga) opposite Beanie Sigel, Noriega, and Damon Dash in the Dash-directed hip hop cult classic State Property 2.

Among his guest starring roles in television dramas are 'Calvin Trainier', a Suge Knight-esque record label honcho in Michael Mann's Robbery Homicide Division, as 'Charles Lambert', an NFL linebacker who years earlier suffered sexual abuse at the hands of his adoptive father, and as 'Dion'- an imprisoned homosexual snitch in Sons Of Anarchy.

In the winter of 2011 and summer of 2012 Bentt directed the critically received off-Broadway production of 'Kid Shamrock', a play about the struggles, triumphs, demons and redemption of 1970s Long Island New York middleweight contender 'Irish' Bobby Cassidy Sr.

Bentt is cited by jazz and film composer, Terence Blanchard, as having provided the inspiration for his Opera Theatre Of St.Louis' 2013 production of 'Champion'. This play is based on the real life ring fights and subsequent death of Benny 'Kid' Paret at the hands of Emile Griffith, a bisexual boxer in 1962. Over the years while training Blanchard in boxing, Bentt, would share with him the transcendent and tragic elements that befell the two fighters.

Bentt served as a faculty member and Co-Teacher for the 'Anna Deavere Smith Project: Empathy and Acting' at the Yerba Buena Center for the Arts in San Francisco during 2013.

== Professional boxing record ==
13 fights	11 wins	2 losses
By knockout	6	2
By decision	5	0

No.	Result	Record	Opponent	Type	Round, time	Date	Location	Notes
13	Loss	11–2	Herbie Hide	KO	7 (12), 2:50	Mar 19, 1994	The Den, London, England	Lost WBO heavyweight title
12	Win	11–1	Tommy Morrison	TKO	1 (12), 1:33	Oct 29, 1993	Convention Center, Tulsa, Oklahoma, U.S.	Won WBO heavyweight title
11	Win	10–1	Mark Wills	UD	10	Jul 15, 1993	Foxwoods Resort Casino, Ledyard, Connecticut, U.S.	
10	Win	9–1	Danny Wofford	UD	8	May 28, 1993	New York City, New York, U.S.	
9	Win	8–1	Kenneth Myers	TKO	3 (8)	Sep 25, 1992	Friar Tuck Inn, Catskill, New York, U.S.	
8	Win	7–1	Jerry Arentzen	TKO	3 (6)	Aug 14, 1992	Etess Arena, Atlantic City, New Jersey, U.S.	
7	Win	6–1	David Graves	MD	6	May 2, 1992	Fort Worth, Texas, U.S.	
6	Win	5–1	Rick Honeycutt	TKO	1 (6), 2:53	Mar 11, 1992	Paramount Theatre, New York City, New York, U.S.	
5	Win	4–1	Lynwood Jones	PTS	6	Nov 19, 1991	Issy-les-Moulineaux, France	
4	Win	3–1	Willie Johnson	TKO	1 (6)	Sep 13, 1991	Jacksonville, Florida, U.S.	
3	Win	2–1	Lynwood Jones	PTS	6	May 16, 1991	Jacksonville, Florida, U.S.	
2	Win	1–1	James Holly	KO	1 (4)	Dec 12, 1990	Royal Albert Hall, London, England	
1	Loss	0–1	Jerry Jones	KO	1 (4), 2:59	Feb 7, 1989	Trump's Castle, Atlantic City, New Jersey, U.S.	

== Filmography ==
Year	Film	Role
1999	Shadow Boxers	Himself
2000	Black People Hate Me and They Hate My Glasses	Supreme
2000	Girlfight	Fight Pro
2001	Ali	Sonny Liston
2002	Niche	David
2002	Dark Blue	Officer Clay
2003	Hollywood Homicide	Club Security Guard
2004	El Padrino	Loc N. Load
2004	Collateral	Fever Bouncer
2004	Million Dollar Baby	Boxer
2005	State Property 2	Biggis (El Plaga)
2005	Fighting Tommy Riley	Mosley
2007	The Neighbor	Police Officer
2009	Redemption	Peanut
2009	Public Enemies	Herbert Youngblood
2009	Blue	Mr. Parker
2009	Risen	Archie Moore

== Television appearances ==
Year	Series	Episode	Role
1985	Saturday Night Live	Howard Cosell and Greg Kihn	Boxer
2001	The Invisible Man	Den of Thieves	Prison Guard
2002	Robbery Homicide Division	Alton Davis Redux	Calvin Tranier
2002	Firefly	War Stories	Viktor
2004	The Guardian	Remember	Charles Lambert
2005	Medium	A Priest, a Doctor and a Medium Walk Into an Execution Chamber	Guard
2005	JAG	Dream Team	Chief Master at Arm
2005	Threshold	Pulse	Officer
2005	Threshold	Progeny	Detective
2009	Heartland	I Make Myself Into Something New	Joseph Hanratty
2009	Lincoln Heights	Persons of Interest	Det. Resendez
2009	Sons Of Anarchy	Gilead	Dion
2019	Losers	The Miscast Champion	Himself

Sporting positions
Amateur boxing titles
Previous: Henry Milligan	U.S. heavyweight champion 1984	Next: Jerry Goff
Previous: Jerry Goff	U.S. heavyweight champion 1986–1987	Next: Ray Mercer
World boxing titles
Preceded by Tommy Morrison	WBO heavyweight champion October 29, 1993 – March 19, 1994	Succeeded by Herbie Hide
