= Riddick Bowe vs. Evander Holyfield III =

1995 boxing match

The Final Chapter
- Date: November 4, 1995
- Venue: Caesars Palace, Paradise, Nevada

Tale of the tape
Boxer	Riddick Bowe	Evander Holyfield
Nickname	Big Daddy	The Real Deal
Hometown	Brooklyn, New York, U.S.	Atlanta, Georgia, U.S.
Purse	$8,000,000	$8,000,000
Pre-fight record	37–1 (1) (31 KO)	31–2 (22 KO)
Age	28 years, 2 months	33 years
Height	6 ft 5 in (196 cm)	6 ft 2 1/2 in (189 cm)
Weight	240 lb (109 kg)	213 lb (97 kg)
Style	Orthodox	Orthodox
Recognition	WBO; Heavyweight Champion; The Ring; No. 1 Ranked Heavyweight; The Ring No. 9 ranked pound-for-pound fighter Former Undisputed Champion	WBC; No. 5 Ranked Heavyweight; The Ring; No. 2 Ranked Heavyweight; 2-division undisputed heavyweight champion

Result
- Bowe wins via 8th-round TKO

Riddick Bowe vs. Evander Holyfield III, billed as The Final Chapter, was a professional boxing match contested on November 4, 1995. The non-title match marked the third and final fight in the Bowe–Holyfield trilogy.

== Background ==
After the previous fight between the two in which Holyfield was able to regain the WBA, IBF and Lineal heavyweight titles by defeating Bowe via majority decision, Holyfield would face undefeated southpaw Michael Moorer in his first defense. Though Holyfield would knock Moorer down in the 2nd round, Moorer overcame and was able to earn the victory via majority decision. Holyfield retired shortly after the loss, citing a heart ailment that Holyfield later claimed was misdiagnosed. He returned to the ring in 1995 and defeated former contender Ray Mercer in his comeback fight.

Bowe, meanwhile, had fought four times since losing his title. In the first, against Buster Mathis, Jr., Bowe was handed a no-contest decision despite knocking Mathis down and then hitting him while he was down, which is normally grounds for a disqualification. After defeating Larry Donald, Bowe won the then lightly regarded WBO Heavyweight title by knocking out Herbie Hide. After a successful defense of his title against Jorge Luis González, Bowe and Holyfield would agree to a non-title rubber match set for November 4, 1995, two years after their previous fight. Holyfield did not want to challenge for the WBO title as he thought it would politically hinder his chances of gaining a match for one of the three major titles.

== The fight ==
Unlike the previous two fights between the two, this match would not go the full 12 rounds, instead Bowe would earn the deciding victory via 8th round technical knockout, becoming the first man to knock out Holyfield. The match was perhaps the most brutal of the trilogy with each man knocking the other down. By round 5, Holyfield, who was suffering from Hepatitis A appeared to be completely exhausted. Nevertheless, Holyfield came back strong in round 6, knocking down Bowe for the first time in Bowe's professional career with a left hook to the chin. In round 8, Bowe would return the favor knocking down Holyfield twice. Holyfield came at Bowe aggressively, throwing a combination at Bowe. Bowe was able to counter with a short right hand that knocked Holyfield to the canvas. Holyfield was able to answer referee Joe Cortez's (who officiated the first fight) count at nine but was quickly knocked down by Bowe again, forcing Cortez to stop the fight and award Bowe the victory via technical knockout. This was the first time Holyfield had been stopped in his professional career.

== Aftermath ==
The two fighters would head in opposite directions after the fight. Holyfield continued his comeback and knocked out former two-division champion Bobby Czyz in his next fight in May 1996. Later that year, he was contracted to face Mike Tyson, whom Holyfield had originally signed to fight in 1991 before injury and Tyson's rape conviction scuttled the planned bout, for the first defense of the WBA championship Tyson won from Bruce Seldon. Holyfield scored what was considered an upset by knocking Tyson out in the eleventh round, becoming the second fighter after Muhammad Ali to win a heavyweight championship more than twice. The win over Tyson marked a resurgence in Holyfield's career, as he would later defeat Michael Moorer to regain the IBF title and eventually become the only four-time world heavyweight champion before he retired.

Bowe, meanwhile, was aiming for a fight with his former nemesis Lennox Lewis and both fighters had agreed to a fall 1996 fight. He soon vacated his WBO title by the end of 1995 to do so. Bowe agreed to take a tuneup fight with Polish heavyweight Andrew Golota, an undefeated but fringe contender who had yet to fight a high-profile opponent. Bowe, disregarding Golota's abilities, came into the fight out of shape and struggled against the undefeated Golota. He remained in contention to win, though, because Golota continued to commit fouls for punches below the belt. Bowe would eventually earn a disqualification victory, which triggered a massive brawl in the ring postfight. Bowe's overall performance cost him the Lewis fight and he instead fought Golota again in his next fight. Again, Bowe was outboxed by Golota but managed to win via disqualification because of Golota's low punches. Shortly after the Golota fights Bowe abruptly retired to join the Marine Reserves, only to quit after three days. He eventually returned to the ring to fight three times in the 2000s, winning all three bouts, and was elected to the International Boxing Hall of Fame.

As recently as 2011, Bowe has discussed the possibility of a fourth fight with Holyfield. However, nothing further has been announced.

== Undercard ==
Confirmed bouts:

== Broadcasting ==
Country	Broadcaster
Australia	Premier Sports Australia
Mexico	Televisa
United Kingdom	Sky Sports
United States	HBO

Preceded by vs. Jorge Luis González	Riddick Bowe's bouts November 4, 1995	Succeeded by vs. Andrew Golota
Preceded by vs. Ray Mercer	Evander Holyfield's bouts November 4, 1995	Succeeded by vs. Bobby Czyz
