= Riddick Bowe vs. Larry Donald =

1994 boxing match

- Date: December 3, 1994
- Venue: Caesars Palace, Paradise, Nevada
- Title(s) on the line: WBC Continental Americas Heavyweight title

Tale of the tape
Boxer	(United States) Riddick Bowe	(United States) Larry Donald
Nickname	"Big Daddy"	"The Legend"
Hometown	Brooklyn, New York	Cincinnati, Ohio
Purse	$1,000,000	$490,000
Pre-fight record	34–1 (1) (29 KO)	16–0 (12 KO)
Age	27 years, 3 months	27 years, 10 months
Height	6 ft 5 in (196 cm)	6 ft 3 in (191 cm)
Weight	241 lb (109 kg)	228 lb (103 kg)
Style	Orthodox	Orthodox
Recognition	IBF; No. 5 Ranked Heavyweight; WBA; No. 8 Ranked Heavyweight; The Ring; No. 3 Ranked Heavyweight; Former undisputed champion	WBC; No. 5 Ranked Heavyweight; IBF; No. 8 Ranked Heavyweight; WBA; No. 11 Ranked Heavyweight; The Ring; No. 7 Ranked Heavyweight

Result
- Bowe defeated Donald via Unanimous decision

Riddick Bowe vs. Larry Donald was a professional boxing match contested on December 3, 1994.

== Background ==
Just over a year prior, Riddick Bowe had defended his WBA and IBF titles in a highly anticipated rematch with Evander Holyfield, the man he had defeated to capture the titles. In a closely contested match, Holyfield would win by majority decision, becoming the new heavyweight champion and handing Bowe his first (and would what turn out to be his only) loss as a professional. After nine months of inactivity, Bowe made his return on August 13, 1994, to face fringe contender Buster Mathis, Jr. in his first comeback fight. Bowe was clearly ahead on the scorecards when Mathis took a knee to recover after being overwhelmed by a barrage of heavy punches from Bowe. However, while Bowe quickly landed a right hand that knocked Mathis out. As the punch was illegal and Mathis could not continue, Bowe faced the possibility of being charged with a disqualification loss, but both referee Arthur Mercante Sr. and the New Jersey State Athletic Control Board decided to rule the bout a no-contest. Having narrowly escaped a second consecutive loss, Bowe agreed to face undefeated prospect Larry Donald in his next fight. Donald was only in his second year as a pro, but had won all 16 of his fights, including victories over fellow undefeated prospect Jeremy Williams and former heavyweight title challenger Bert Cooper. Donald was also ranked by all three major boxing organizations, with the WBC ranking him highest of all at number 5. In contrast, Bowe was only ranked by two of the three organizations (#5 by the IBF and #8 by the WBA) and despite being only two years removed from capturing their heavyweight championship, was completely unranked by the WBC.

At a press conference in Los Angeles only five days before the fight was to take place, Bowe and Donald exchanged words when Bowe suddenly hit Donald with a left-right combination before the two were separated. Donald did not retaliate, but was critical of Bowe for the act, calling him "unprofessional", "afraid" and stated "When you try so hard to intimidate someone, it means that you're the one who's intimidated." Bowe offered no apology to Donald and simply explained that he "had heard that he was talking trash, and I told him, 'if you say one more thing, I'm going to hit you'. He opened his mouth again, so I popped him."

On the undercard future two time champion Hasim Rahman made his professional debut.

== The Fight ==
In what would prove to be a largely uneventful fight, Bowe would earn an overwhelmingly lopsided decision. Bowe was the aggressor for the entire fight while Donald used a defensive strategy and spent most of the fight retreating from Bowe while throwing punches in short flurries before quickly moving away. Bowe dominated the punch stats, landing 219 punches during the course of the fight while Donald landed only 103. The official scorecards were also clearly in Bowe's favor. One judge had Bowe winning all 12 rounds and scored the fight 120–108 in his favor. The other two judge's had Bowe winning 10 of the 12 rounds and scored the fight 118–109 and 118–110.

HBO's unofficial scorer Harold Lederman had it 117–111 for Bowe. The Associated Press also scored the bout for Bowe, 118–111.

== Aftermath ==
Despite possessing an impressive 35–1 record, Bowe still found difficulty in securing a match for one of the major heavyweight titles. As a result, Bowe would challenge Herbie Hide for the WBO title, which at the time was less regarded than the WBA, WBC and IBF versions of the title. Bowe would ultimately defeat Hide in dominating fashion on March 11, 1995, to capture the WBO championship. He would then have two more fights in 1995, first obtaining a knockout victory over former amateur rival Jorge Luis González in what would prove to be his only defense of the WBO title, and then knocking out Evander Holyfield in their anticipated rubbermatch. All in all, Bowe finished 1995 a perfect 3–0 with three knockout victories that increased his record to 38–1.

Donald would finish the remainder of the decade without recording another loss, though most of his fights were against journeymen and past-their-prime former contenders. Nevertheless, with his record now standing at an impressive 38–1–2, Donald secured a WBA title "eliminator" bout with Kirk Johnson in 2001 with the victor earning a shot at John Ruiz and the WBA heavyweight title, though he would lose by a close decision. Donald would earn several more WBA title "eliminator" fights but was unable to win any of them. He would retire in 2007 with a record of 42–5–3.

== Undercard ==
Confirmed bouts:

== Broadcasting ==
Country	Broadcaster
United States	HBO

Preceded by vs. Buster Mathis Jr.	Riddick Bowe's bouts December 3, 1994	Succeeded by vs. Herbie Hide
Preceded by vs. Dan Murphy	Larry Donald's bouts December 3, 1994	Succeeded by vs. David Dixon
