= The Ring magazine Event of the Year =

The Ring magazine was established in 1922 and has named a notable boxing Event of the Year since 1993, based on the magazine's writers' criteria.

== Event of the Year by decade ==
=== 1990s ===
- 1993 – Fan Man at Bowe-Holyfield II
- 1994 – Revenge: The Rematches
- 1995 – Tyson returns
- 1996 – Riot at the Garden (see Riddick Bowe vs. Andrew Golota)
- 1997 – The Bite
- 1998 – Tyson's reinstatement
- 1999 – The IBF indictments

=== 2000s ===
- 2000 – Oscar De La Hoya vs. Shane Mosley
- 2001 – Middleweight World Championship Series
- 2002 – The Lewis–Tyson press conference brawl
- 2003 – Roy Jones fights at heavyweight
- 2004 – Lennox Lewis retirement
- 2005 – The Contender
- 2006 – Corrales-Castillo III weigh-in
- 2007 – Oscar De La Hoya vs. Floyd Mayweather Jr.
- 2008 – The retirement of Floyd Mayweather Jr.
- 2009 – Antonio Margarito caught cheating

=== 2010s ===
- 2010 – The failure to make Mayweather vs. Pacquiao
- 2011 – Manny Pacquiao vs. Juan Manuel Márquez III
- 2012 – September 15: HBO and Showtime both hold boxing events in Las Vegas: Chávez Jr. vs. Martínez and Álvarez vs. López
- 2013 – Floyd Mayweather Jr. vs. Canelo Álvarez
- 2014 – Carl Froch vs. George Groves II
- 2015 – Floyd Mayweather Jr. vs. Manny Pacquiao
- 2016 – The death of Muhammad Ali
- 2017 – Canelo Álvarez vs. Gennady Golovkin
- 2018 – HBO leaves boxing (see HBO World Championship Boxing and Boxing After Dark)
- 2019 – Andy Ruiz Jr. vs. Anthony Joshua II

=== 2020s ===
- 2020 – COVID-19
- 2021 – Anthony Joshua vs. Oleksandr Usyk
- 2022 – Katie Taylor vs. Amanda Serrano
- 2023 – Anthony Joshua vs. Otto Wallin
- 2024 – Tyson Fury vs. Oleksandr Usyk
- 2025 – Not awarded
