= Jorge Luis González =

Cuban boxer

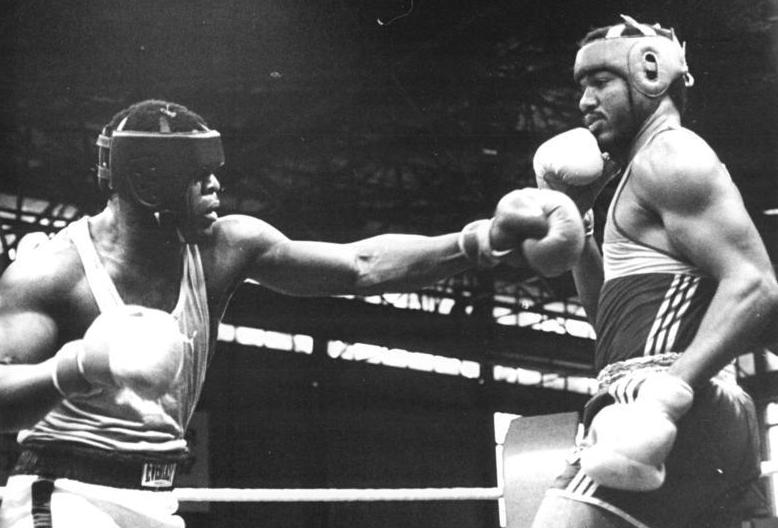
- Jorge Luis González (right) versus Austrian Biko Botowamungu in Halle, 1987

Personal information
- Nationality: (Cuba) Cuban
- Born: Jorge Luis González; October 19, 1964 (age 61) Havana, Cuba
- Height: 6 ft 7 in (2.01 m)
- Weight: Heavyweight

Boxing career
- Reach: 82 in (210 cm)
- Stance: Orthodox

Boxing record
- Total fights: 39
- Wins: 31
- Win by KO: 27
- Losses: 8
- Draws: 0
- No contests: 0
Medal record
Men's amateur boxing
Representing Cuba
Pan American Games
Gold medal – first place	1983 Caracas	Super Heavyweight
Gold medal – first place	1987 Indianapolis	Super Heavyweight
Central American and Caribbean Games
Gold medal – first place	1986 Santiago	Super Heavyweight
North American Championships
Gold medal – first place	1982 Las Vegas	Super Heavyweight
Silver medal – second place	1987 Toronto	Super Heavyweight

Jorge Luis González (born October 19, 1964) (DOB disputed) is a former heavyweight boxing contender and prospect born in Havana, Cuba. He won the gold medal at the 1983 Pan American Games and the 1987 Pan American Games and the former WBO Latino Heavyweight Champion. On June 17, 1995, the big puncher González became the first Cuban boxer to challenge for a heavyweight world title when he fought WBO champion Riddick Bowe at MGM Grand Garden Arena in Las Vegas.

== Amateur ==
González compiled an Amateur Record of 220–13. His highlights include:

- Super Heavyweight Gold Medalist at the 1983 Pan-American Games in Caracas, Venezuela.
- Super Heavyweight Gold Medalist at the 1987 Pan-American Games in Indianapolis, United States. His results were:
  - Defeated Riddick Bowe (United States) 3:2
  - Defeated Lennox Lewis (Canada) 4:1
- Lost to Lennox Lewis at the 1987 North American Championships in Toronto, Canada, by decision.

After an outstanding amateur career in Cuba, where he defeated the likes of Teofilo Stevenson, Tyrell Biggs, and Craig Payne, he defected during a Cuban Team event in Finland, in 1991.

== Pro ==
He reached the US and turned professional in Miami in June 1991. His progress as a professional was severely hindered by González's refusal to co-operate with trainers or training, feeling as a top Cuban amateur there was nothing he could be taught. He went through several different trainers during his first few years as a pro.

At 6'7, he towered over his opposition, and the majority of his fights featured the huge Gonzalez crudely clubbing his victims to defeat. Although he was criticised for not fighting anyone of note, at the time he was a genuinely feared contender and top-class opponents were reticent to fight him.

His most notable results in accumulating a 23-0 (22 KO's) record were his 10-round beating and TKO of Renaldo Snipes, a first-round KO of Phil Brown, and a one punch, two-round KO of Mike Evans, Evans's first defeat in ten years.

In June 1995, after a heated build up, he fought hated arch rival Riddick Bowe in Las Vegas, for the WBO Heavyweight championship. Bowe exposed González for his limitations and lack of development, savagely pounding the Cuban before knocking him clean out in the 6th round.

In 1996 González returned, seemingly out of shape, for a high-profile fight with ex-champ Tim Witherspoon in New York. Gonzalez blew his chance of redemption, as Witherspoon used his superior skills and big power to take González apart, decking him twice and knocking him out in five rounds, issuing an even more complete defeat than Bowe had done.

Later that year González quit midway through a fight with trial horse Ross Puritty, ending his term as a contender.

In 1997 hot prospect and equally giant Michael Grant blew him away in one round, although in 1999 a new and improved González resurfaced, in-shape and more polished, bombing out Alex Stewart in two rounds and outpointing ex-champ Greg Page over ten.

A Mike Tyson fight failed to materialise as Tyson-lookalike Cliff Couser demolished the Cuban in three rounds in 2000. In 2001 González lost to Joe Mesi in four, and his career was effectively dead in 2002 when last minute sub Derek Bryant walked over him in one round.

His only title was the WBO Latino Heavyweight title in which he defeated Daniel Eduardo Neto by Points decision.

== Professional boxing record ==
39 fights	31 wins	8 losses
By knockout	27	7
By decision	4	1

No.	Result	Record	Opponent	Type	Round, time	Date	Location	Notes
39	Loss	31–8	Derek Bryant	TKO	1 (10), 2:33	18 Jan 2002	Paris Las Vegas, Las Vegas, Nevada	
38	Loss	31–7	Joe Mesi	TKO	4 (10), 1:33	27 Apr 2001	Niagara Falls Civic Center, Niagara Falls, New York	
37	Loss	31–6	Cliff Couser	TKO	3 (10), 2:52	5 Aug 2000	Silver Star Casino, Philadelphia, Mississippi	
36	Win	31-5	Bradley Rone	UD	8	3 Jun 2000	MGM Grand Garden Arena, Las Vegas, Nevada	
35	Win	30-5	Greg Page	UD	10	14 Nov 1999	Rose Garden Arena, Portland, Oregon	
34	Win	29–5	Tommy Martin	TKO	9 (10), 1:21	25 Jul 1999	Harrah's, Kansas City, Missouri	
33	Win	28-5	Alex Stewart	TKO	2 (10), 2:38	6 Jun 1999	New Frontier Hotel and Casino, Las Vegas, Nevada	
32	Win	27-5	Rodolfo Marin	TKO	4 (10), 2:02	18 Apr 1999	Miccosukee Casino, Miami, Florida	
31	Win	26-5	Josh Gormley	TKO	10 (10), 2:58	7 Nov 1998	Civic Center, Bismarck, North Dakota	
30	Loss	25–5	Paea Wolfgramm	MD	8	15 Aug 1998	El Paso County Coliseum, El Paso, Texas	
29	Loss	25–4	Michael Grant	TKO	1 (12), 2:00	7 Nov 1997	Bally's Las Vegas, Las Vegas, Nevada	For IBC World Heavyweight Title
28	Win	25–3	Daniel Eduardo Neto	PTS	12	19 Apr 1997	Convention Center, Condado, Puerto Rico	Won vacant WBO Latino Heavyweight Title
27	Loss	24–3	Ross Puritty	TKO	7 (10), 2:48	5 Dec 1996	Brady Theater, Tulsa, Oklahoma	
26	Loss	24–2	Tim Witherspoon	TKO	5 (10), 2:54	10 May 1996	Madison Square Garden, New York City	
25	Win	24–1	Jason Waller	TKO	4 (10), 2:07	30 Sep 1995	The Aladdin, Las Vegas, Nevada	
24	Loss	23–1	Riddick Bowe	KO	6 (12), 1:50	17 Jun 1995	MGM Grand Garden Arena, Las Vegas, Nevada	For WBO World Heavyweight Title
23	Win	23–0	Brian Scott	TKO	2 (10), 2:34	11 Mar 1995	MGM Grand Garden Arena, Las Vegas, Nevada	
22	Win	22–0	Tui Toia	TKO	2 (10), 1:01	18 Nov 1994	MGM Grand Garden Arena, Las Vegas, Nevada	
21	Win	21–0	Olian Alexander	RTD	7 (10), 3:00	5 Nov 1994	MGM Grand Garden Arena, Las Vegas, Nevada	
20	Win	20–0	Calvin Jones	TKO	4 (10), 1:50	31 Aug 1994	MGM Grand Garden Arena, Las Vegas, Nevada	
19	Win	19–0	Mike Ronay Evans	KO	2 (10), 2:48	25 Jun 1994	MGM Grand Garden Arena, Las Vegas, Nevada	
18	Win	18–0	Mike Rouse	KO	1 (10), 2:48	25 Feb 1994	Deauville Beach Resort, Miami Beach, Florida	
17	Win	17–0	Renaldo Snipes	TKO	10 (10), 2:15	6 Nov 1993	Caesars Palace, Las Vegas, Nevada	
16	Win	16–0	Kimmuel Odum	KO	2 (10), 2:15	17 Aug 1993	Casino Magic, Bay Saint Louis, Mississippi	
15	Win	15–0	Dwayne Hall	TKO	1 (8), 2:22	22 May 1993	RFK Stadium, Washington, District of Columbia	
14	Win	14–0	Mike White	TKO	4 (10), 2:21	13 Mar 1993	Las Vegas Hilton, Las Vegas, Nevada	
13	Win	13–0	Larry Davis	TKO	2 (8), 2:02	26 Dec 1992	Sahara Hotel, Las Vegas, Nevada	
12	Win	12–0	Philipp Brown	KO	1 (8), 2:51	6 Oct 1992	Mahi Shrine Temple, Miami Beach, Florida	
11	Win	11–0	Mike Acey	TKO	1 (10), 2:17	26 Sep 1992	Miami Beach Convention Center, Miami Beach, Florida	
10	Win	10–0	Michael Greer	RTD	2 (6), 3:00	19 Jun 1992	Caesars Palace, Las Vegas, Nevada	
9	Win	9–0	David Graves	PTS	8	21 May 1992	Bally's Las Vegas, Las Vegas, Nevada	
8	Win	8–0	Tyrone Armstrong	KO	2 (6), 2:53	18 Apr 1992	Las Vegas, Nevada	
7	Win	7–0	Mike Gans	TKO	5 (6), 0:57	15 Mar 1992	Bally's Las Vegas, Las Vegas, Nevada	
6	Win	6–0	Benji Smith	TKO	1 (6), 0:15	13 Dec 1991	Sun Dome, Tampa, Florida	
5	Win	5–0	Mark George	TKO	2 (6)	23 Nov 1991	The Omni, Atlanta, Georgia	
4	Win	4–0	Sam Adkins	KO	2 (6)	6 Sep 1991	Miami Beach, Florida	
3	Win	3–0	Larry Fortner	TKO	1 (4)	30 Jul 1991	Miami Beach, Florida	
2	Win	2–0	Adolfo Morell	TKO	2 (4)	10 Jul 1991	San Juan, Puerto Rico	
1	Win	1–0	William Campudani	TKO	3 (4)	21 Jun 1991	Tamiami Fairgrounds Auditorium, Miami, Florida	
