= Riddick Bowe vs. Jorge Luis González =

1995 boxing match

Mortal Enemies
- Date: June 17, 1995
- Venue: MGM Grand Garden Arena, Paradise, Nevada, U.S.
- Title(s) on the line: WBO Heavyweight Championship

Tale of the tape
Boxer	Riddick Bowe	Jorge Luis González
Nickname	Big Daddy	
Hometown	Brooklyn, New York, U.S.	Havana, Cuba
Purse	$1,000,000	$300,000
Pre-fight record	36–1 (1) (30 KO)	23–0 (22 KO)
Age	27 years, 10 months	30 years, 7 months
Height	6 ft 5 in (196 cm)	6 ft 7 in (201 cm)
Weight	243 lb (110 kg)	237 lb (108 kg)
Style	Orthodox	Orthodox
Recognition	WBO; Heavyweight Champion; The Ring; No. 2 Ranked Heavyweight	WBO; No. 1 Ranked Heavyweight; IBF; No. 10 Ranked Heavyweight; The Ring; No. 9 Ranked Heavyweight

Result
- Bowe wins via 6th-round knockout

Riddick Bowe vs. Jorge Luis González, billed as "Mortal Enemies", was a professional boxing match contested on June 17, 1995 for the WBO Heavyweight Championship.

== Background ==
Having been seemingly blacklisted by the WBA, WBC and IBF, former Undisputed Heavyweight Champion Riddick Bowe was left with little choice other than to compete for the then lightly regarded WBO version of the heavyweight title. In the championship match, Bowe battered the much smaller champion, Britain's Herbie Hide, gaining seven knockdowns through the course of six rounds en route to a knockout victory that made him the new WBO Heavyweight Champion. In his first defense of his newly won title, Bowe would meet undefeated Cuban fighter, Jorge Luis González. The two men had previously fought each other as amateurs at the 1987 Pan American Games, with González gaining four knockdowns on Bowe en route to a unanimous decision victory and an eventual Gold Medal. As a professional, González had yet to lose a match, but up until his match with Bowe, had faced mostly journeymen with his most notable opponent being former heavyweight contender Renaldo Snipes. González had hoped to get a championship match with Bowe when Bowe was still the WBA and IBF Heavyweight champion, but Bowe's loss to Evander Holyfield in their 1993 rematch prevented the bout from taking place. When the fight was announced, Bowe and Gonzalez would engage in months of heavy buildup that would include a substantial amount of trash talk from both fighters, as well as physical confrontations. The pre-fight hype started at a March 22, 1995 press conference in which both fighters would attend to officially announce their June 17 match. Shortly after Bowe arrived, Gonzalez confronted him with a slap on the wrist that caused a minor scuffle between Gonzalez, Bowe, Bowe's manager Rock Newman and Bowe's aide-de-camp Bernard Benton. At another press conference in April, the two men hurled ice at each other and had to be restrained by their respective managers to prevent a brawl from erupting. Gonzalez would supply a barrage of insults directed at Bowe. Among them, Gonzalez compared himself to lion and Bowe to a cow and threatened several times that he would "kill" Bowe, at one point stating "I will kill him. I want to stand over his body. I want to see blood trickling out of his nose and his mouth. I want to abuse him."

== The fight ==
Despite Gonzalez's threats, Bowe would dominate the duration of their fight, winning every round on all three of the judges' scorecards. Through the first five rounds, Bowe consistently clobbered Gonzalez with powerful combinations while Gonzalez fought with his back against the ropes and offered very little offense against Bowe. Despite dominating the fight, Bowe risked picking up a disqualification loss between rounds 4 and 5. With 20 seconds left in the fourth round, Bowe was pummeling Gonzalez in the corner before Gonzalez was able to clinch Bowe with eight seconds to go, causing referee Mills Lane to separate the two. Bowe ended the round with a three-punch combination that staggered Gonzalez as the bell rang to signify the end of the round. Bowe, however, would continue his assault on Gonzalez after the bell, throwing a powerful right hook and left jab at Gonzalez before Lane was able to get Bowe back to his corner. Bowe was warned by Lane, who ultimately decided to not deduct any points from the champion. After five rounds of abusing Gonzalez, Bowe ended the fight at 1:40 of round six. Bowe landed a strong overhand right to the side of Gonzalez's head that sent Gonzalez crashing to the canvas. Referee Lane began his 10-count but with Gonzalez clearly unresponsive, stopped at the count of eight, giving Bowe the victory by knockout at 1:50 of round six.

== Aftermath ==
This fight would prove to be Bowe's only defense of his WBO Heavyweight Championship. Bowe's manager Rock Newman originally organized a title match that would see Bowe defend his WBO crown against former WBO Heavyweight Champion Tommy Morrison, but instead was able to come to an agreement that would see Bowe have his much anticipated rubber match with Evander Holyfield. As Holyfield did not want to fight for the WBO title he thought it would hurt his chances at gaining a fight for one of the three other major heavyweight titles, Bowe ultimately decided to vacate the title so the match could take place. Bowe would rebound from his first professional knockdown to defeat an exhausted Holyfield, who was suffering from hepatitis during the bout, by eighth round technical knockout to take the final match of the Bowe–Holyfield trilogy.

== Undercard ==
Confirmed bouts:

Winner	Loser	Weight division/title belt(s) disputed	Result
(United States) Brian LaSpada	(United States) Art Jimmerson	vacant NABF cruiserweight title	11th round DQ.
(Mexico) Saul Duran	(Colombia) Wilfrido Ruiz (c)	For IBC super featherweight title	11th round TKO.
(New Zealand) Jimmy Thunder	(United States) Bomani Parker	Heavyweight (10 rounds)	1st round TKO.
(Vietnam) Skipper Kelp	(United States) Anthony Ivory	Super Welterweight (8 rounds)	Majority decision.
Non-TV bouts
(Panama) Santiago Samaniego	(United States) Gabriel Palafox	Super Welterweight (8 rounds)	4th round RTD.
(United States) Jeff Wooden	(United States) Matthew Brooks	Heavyweight (6 rounds)	Unanimous decision.
(Jamaica) Richard Hall	(United States) Robert Britt	Light Heavyweight (4 rounds)	4th round TKO.
(United States) Guy Sonnenberg	(United States) Chad Ragin	Heavyweight (4 rounds)	Majority decision.
(United States) Rick Roufus	(United States) Mike Brainard	Cruiserweight (4 rounds)	3rd round TKO.

== Broadcasting ==
Country	Broadcaster
Mexico	Televisa
United States	HBO

Preceded by vs. Herbie Hide	Riddick Bowe's bouts June 17 1995	Succeeded by vs. Evander Holyfield III
Preceded by vs. Brian Scott	Jorge Luis González's bouts June 17 1995	Succeeded by vs. Jason Waller
