= Herbie Hide vs. Riddick Bowe =

Boxing competition

- Date: March 11, 1995
- Venue: MGM Grand Garden Arena, Paradise, Nevada, U.S.
- Title(s) on the line: WBO Heavyweight Championship

Tale of the tape
Boxer	Herbie Hide	Riddick Bowe
Nickname	The Dancing Destroyer	Big Daddy
Hometown	Norwich, England, UK	Brooklyn, New York, U.S.
Purse	$3,000,000	$3,000,000
Pre-fight record	26–0 (25 KO)	35–1 (1) (29 KO)
Age	23 years, 6 months	27 years, 7 months
Height	6 ft 2 in (188 cm)	6 ft 5 in (196 cm)
Weight	214 lb (97 kg)	241 lb (109 kg)
Style	Orthodox	Orthodox
Recognition	WBO; Heavyweight Champion; The Ring; No. 6 Ranked Heavyweight	The Ring; No. 3 Ranked Heavyweight; Former Undisputed Champion

Result
- Bowe wins via 6th-round knockout

Herbie Hide vs. Riddick Bowe was a professional boxing match contested on March 11, 1995, for the World Boxing Organization Heavyweight Championship. The bout took place at the MGM Grand Garden Arena in Paradise, Nevada, and was televised by HBO. Hide was making the first defense of the title he had won from Michael Bentt in a fight that resulted in Bentt suffering career ending injuries while Bowe was trying to find his way back into the world championship picture sixteen months after he lost his place as champion to Evander Holyfield. Bowe defeated Hide in the 6th round.

== Background ==
After losing his WBA and IBF Heavyweight titles in a 1993 rematch with Evander Holyfield, Riddick Bowe was forced to go down the comeback trail. In his first match after losing his titles, Bowe faced Buster Mathis Jr. in August 1994 in Atlantic City. In the fourth round, Mathis dropped to a knee after withstanding a Bowe onslaught late in the round. Bowe hit Mathis again while he was down, knocking him over onto his back. Bowe was originally going to be disqualified by referee Arthur Mercante Sr., but after discussing it with New Jersey State Boxing Commissioner Larry Hazzard the official decision was handed down as a no-contest.

After that, Bowe would face the undefeated but little-known Larry Donald. Prior to the fight, Bowe would further damage his reputation after he infamously sucker-punched Donald at a press conference, landing a two-punch combination on an unsuspecting Donald after Donald stated that he would not be knocked out by Bowe, a statement that would prove to be true as he would go the full 12 rounds with Bowe, though Bowe would earn the victory by unanimous decision. Despite his impressive record of 35–1, with his only loss being a close majority decision against Holyfield, Bowe found himself unranked by the then considered major boxing organizations (the WBA, WBC and IBF, the WBO would be considered a 4th major organization only years later by such outlets as Ring Magazine and HBO Boxing). With virtually no chance of receiving a shot at one of the major titles, Bowe instead decided to challenge undefeated Herbie Hide for the less-regarded WBO Heavyweight Championship. Despite his undefeated record and status as champion, Hide was given little chance to defeat Bowe and came into the fight as the underdog. Unfazed, Hide called Bowe "overrated" and brazenly claimed that he would outbox Bowe before earning the victory either by decision or late-round knockout. Bowe paid little attention to Hide's comments or the fact that he was fighting for a less-regarded title, stating "It's not about titles, it's about the men who hold them. Boxing fans know I'm the best heavyweight in the world, and when I win this title, they'll consider me the true champ."

== The Fight ==
Through the first two rounds, Hide lived up to his nickname of "The Dancing Destroyer", avoiding the bigger and stronger Bowe while occasionally stopping to deliver quick combinations to Bowe and not allowing Bowe to land many punches. As such, Hide was able to easily win the first two rounds on the judge's scorecards. However, Hide's success would not last long as Bowe would begin to take over the fight in round 3. Hide's downfall began with just over a minute to go in round 3 when he inexplicably fell to the canvas. Though Hide was clearly dazed, referee Richard Steele mistakenly ruled it a slip rather than a knockdown. Hide, having just thrown a barrage of punches to the much larger Bowe was visibly exhausted. Upon careful review of the replay, it appeared the knockdown was the result of an unintentional rabbit punch from Bowe's forearm, as Hide was lunging in. Hide was able to get back on his feet but had trouble finding his balance. Bowe quickly went on the attack and sent Hide back to canvas only seconds later. Hide was able to answer the referee's 10 count and continued on with the fight. Hide then tried to fight back but was knocked down for the second time in the round by a Bowe uppercut. He was again able to get back up and would survive the remainder of the round. In round 4, Hide rebounded and was able to stagger Bowe with multiple-punch combination. Bowe attempted to counter with a left hook, but Hide was able to dodge the attempt and Bowe's momentum sent him to the canvas, though Steele ruled it a slip rather than a knockdown. In the round's final minute, Bowe would gain another two knockdowns after hitting an exhausted Hide with several combinations, but Hide was able to recover both times to survive the round. In Round 5, Bowe was able to gain a fifth knockdown with left hook–right hand combination. Hide again was able to answer the referee's 10 count and was able to finish the round strongly. In round 6, however, Bowe was able to gain a sixth knockdown about midway through the round. Not wanting Hide to take any more punishment, his corner threw in the towel in hopes that Steele would end the fight. However, because it was against the rules, Steele simply ignored the towel and allowed Hide to continue on. With 50 seconds left, Bowe was able to knock down Hide for the seventh time. Hide was counted out by Steele after not being able to get back to his feet. As such, Bowe was rewarded with a knockout victory at 2:25 of the sixth round.

== Aftermath ==
After making one defense of the WBO title, Bowe vacated the belt and signed to fight Evander Holyfield, who had recently returned to fighting after a brief retirement, in a third contest held in November 1995 in Las Vegas. Bowe knocked Holyfield down twice in the eighth round en route to a technical knockout victory, despite being knocked down for the first time in his career in the fight. After the fight, Bowe embarked on a series of controversial bouts with Andrew Golota and then disappeared from the ring for nearly a decade; he never fought for a world title again.

Hide, meanwhile, won the WBO title a second time by knocking out Tony Tucker in the second round of a bout set up in June 1997 after Henry Akinwande vacated the title to challenge Lennox Lewis for the WBC title. He made two defenses of the title before losing it to Vitali Klitschko in 1999. He has not fought since 2010, and is currently serving a prison sentence for distributing cocaine.

== Undercard ==
Confirmed bouts:

== Broadcasting ==
Country	Broadcaster
Mexico	TV Azteca
United Kingdom	Sky Sports
United States	HBO

Preceded by vs. Michael Bentt	Herbie Hide's bouts March 11, 1995	Succeeded by vs. Michael Murray
Preceded by vs. Larry Donald	Riddick Bowe's bouts March 11, 1995	Succeeded by vs. Jorge Luis González
