= Evander Holyfield vs. Alex Stewart II =

Boxing match

Only the Strong Survive
- Date: June 26, 1993
- Venue: Convention Hall, Atlantic City, New Jersey, U.S.

Tale of the tape
Boxer	Evander Holyfield	Alex Stewart
Nickname	The Real Deal	The Destroyer
Hometown	Atlanta Georgia, U.S.	London, England, U.K.
Purse	$2,000,000	$400,000
Pre-fight record	28–1 (22 KO)	32–4 (32 KO)
Age	30 years, 8 months	28 years, 11 months
Height	6 ft 2 in (188 cm)	6 ft 3 in (191 cm)
Weight	212 lb (96 kg)	228 lb (103 kg)
Style	Orthodox	Orthodox
Recognition	WBC; No. 1 Ranked Heavyweight; WBA; No. 2 Ranked Heavyweight; IBF; No. 4 Ranked Heavyweight; The Ring; No. 3 Ranked Heavyweight; 2-division undisputed world champion	WBC; No. 5 Ranked Heavyweight; WBA; No. 8 Ranked Heavyweight; IBF; No. 9 Ranked Heavyweight

Result
- Holyfield wins via unanimous decision (119–109, 118–110, 118–110)

Evander Holyfield vs. Alex Stewart II, billed as Only the Strong Survive, was a professional boxing match contested on June 26, 1993.

== Background ==
In his previous fight on November 13, 1992, Evander Holyfield had suffered his first professional loss to Riddick Bowe, ending his 2-year reign as undisputed heavyweight champion. Following the loss, Holyfield parted ways with long-time trainers Lou Duva and George Benton and replaced them with Emanuel Steward. Holyfield claimed he made the switch to help "rekindle his enthusiasm for boxing." Steward also made the decision to reduce Holyfield's sparring sessions in an effort to keep Holyfield fresh, stating "He's got to start a whole new career if he's going to continue boxing". In the months after the loss, Holyfield mulled a comeback, but in April 1993, he would reach an agreement with Bowe for a rematch later in the year. As part of the contract, both fighters agreed to have one fight before the rematch. Bowe announced that he would defend his heavyweight championship against Jesse Ferguson in May, while Holyfield decided to meet Alex Stewart in a rematch of their 1989 fight in June.

== The fight ==
In contrast to their thrilling 1989 fight, Holyfield controlled almost the entire fight as Stewart offered little offense. A right uppercut landed by Holyfield towards the end of the first round opened a cut beside Stewart's left eye, though it was not as severe as the cut he suffered in the 1989 fight. The fight would go the full 12 rounds with Holyfield winning lopsidedly on all three of the judge's scorecards with 2 scores of 118–110 and one score of 119–109.

== Aftermath ==
Steward blamed the lackluster fight on Stewart, stating "He acted like he didn't want to fight. I was looking for this great war, I was nervous. Then he comes out and looks like he wants to go to bed." Stewart was also critical of his own performance. "Of course this wasn't one of my better performances, I couldn't throw punches, I couldn't get off. I thought I could fight a defensive fight until about the sixth round and then try to go for the kill, but I couldn't get any combinations or anything at all. I have to apologize to everyone because I did not fight a very good fight."

== Fight card ==
Confirmed bouts:

Weight Class	Weight		vs.		Method	Round	Time	Notes
Heavyweight	200+ lb	Evander Holyfield	def.	Alex Stewart	UD	12
Middleweight	160 lb	Vinny Pazienza	def.	Lloyd Honeyghan	TKO	10/12
Super featherweight	130 lb	John John Molina	def.	Manuel Medina	UD	12		^{Note 1}
Middleweight	160 lb	Raúl Márquez	def	Tommy Small	UD	8
Lightweight	135 lb	Ivan Robinson	def	Leon Bostic	UD	6

^Note 1 For IBF Super Featherweight title

Preceded by vs. Riddick Bowe	Evander Holyfield's bouts 26 June 1993	Succeeded by vs. Riddick Bowe II
Preceded by vs. Rick Enis	Alex Stewart's bouts 26 June 1993	Succeeded by vs. Derrick Roddy
