= Evander Holyfield vs. Riddick Bowe =

Boxing competition

- Date: November 13, 1992
- Venue: Thomas & Mack Center, Paradise, Nevada
- Title(s) on the line: WBA, WBC and IBF undisputed heavyweight championship

Tale of the tape
Boxer	Evander Holyfield	Riddick Bowe
Nickname	The Real Deal	Big Daddy
Hometown	Atlanta, Georgia, U.S.	Brooklyn, New York, U.S.
Purse	$5,000,000	$3,000,000
Pre-fight record	28–0 (22 KO)	31–0 (27 KO)
Age	30 years	25 years, 3 months
Height	6 ft 2 1/2 in (189 cm)	6 ft 5 in (196 cm)
Weight	205 lb (93 kg)	235 lb (107 kg)
Style	Orthodox	Orthodox
Recognition	WBA, WBC and IBF undisputed Heavyweight Champion; The Ring; No. 1 Ranked Heavyweight; The Ring pound-for-pound No. 4 ranked fighter 2-division undisputed world champion	WBA; No. 1 Ranked Heavyweight; WBC/IBF; No. 3 Ranked Heavyweight; The Ring; No. 2 Ranked Heavyweight

Result
- Bowe wins via 12-round unanimous decision (115–112, 117–110, 117–110)

Evander Holyfield vs. Riddick Bowe was a professional boxing match that took place on November 13, 1992, in Las Vegas, Nevada. The fight was contested for the undisputed world heavyweight championship, which consisted of the WBA, WBC, and IBF championships.

== Background ==
On October 25, 1990, world's number one contender Holyfield fought Buster Douglas in the first defense of the title that Douglas had won eight months earlier by upsetting Mike Tyson in Tokyo. Holyfield defeated an out-of-shape Douglas by knocking him out in the third round, having made three defenses of his three titles entering this fight. The first was against George Foreman, the former champion who was attempting to become the oldest heavyweight champion ever. After winning a unanimous decision Holyfield signed to fight Tyson on November 8, 1991, but Tyson pulled out with an injury. Instead, Holyfield took on journeyman Bert Cooper and suffered his first career knockdown, nearly falling to defeat before rallying to knock out the lightly regarded contender in a fight that the WBC refused to sanction as a title fight. The planned Tyson fight was then scuttled altogether, after Tyson was convicted of rape and incarcerated in early 1992.

With Holyfield in need of an opponent, undefeated Riddick Bowe emerged as the frontrunner to land the next shot at Holyfield's undisputed championship. Holyfield's manager Shelly Finkel and Bowe's manager Rock Newman, were nearly able to get a deal done shortly after Tyson's conviction, but it fell apart after the two sides could not agree on financial issues. Eventually, Bowe landed a number-one contender match with Pierre Coetzer, which he won by seventh round technical knockout, earning the right to challenge Holyfield for his undisputed heavyweight championship.

Meanwhile, Holyfield took a tune up fight in June 1992, against another aging former champion in Larry Holmes. Although the 43-year-old Holmes had won six consecutive fights after recording what were his only career losses to that point (his 1985 title-losing fight and 1986 rematch with Michael Spinks and his 1988 comeback fight against Tyson) and went the distance with the champion, Holyfield emerged with another unanimous decision win. Holyfield went on to face criticism for taking the title from an uninterested Douglas and then defending it against two past-their-prime fighters in Foreman and Holmes, while also nearly getting knocked out by the journeyman Cooper. As a result, some in the boxing world looked at Holyfield's match with Bowe as a way for the champion to legitimize his reign and earn the respect of his doubters despite already holding the undisputed title for two years.

== The fight ==
Though he had been a 7–5 favorite, Holyfield had difficulty trading punches with the bigger, stronger and younger Bowe. Bowe landed 53% of his 248 thrown punches while Holyfield only managed to land 39% of his 161 thrown.

The fight is perhaps best known for its 10th round, during which Bowe started strongly, hitting Holyfield with several powerful combinations. Holyfield, however, was able to weather the storm and dominated the second half of the round, landing several combinations of his own.

Bowe did better than Holyfield in round 11. Bowe hit Holyfield with even more combinations, eventually hitting Holyfield with a right hook before knocking Holyfield down with a right hand to the side of the head. Though announcer Jim Lampley claimed it would "seem like a miracle" for Holyfield to finish the round, Holyfield somehow managed to survive the remainder of the round.

Knowing he was behind in the scorecards and would need a knockout to win the fight, Holyfield was aggressive in round 12. Bowe was able to withstand Holyfield's offense throughout the round and won all three judge's scorecards by scores of 117–110, 117–110 and 115–112 giving him a unanimous decision victory. The Associated Press scored the bout 116–111 for Bowe.

== Aftermath ==
The match was critically acclaimed, winning The Ring magazine's Fight of the Year with round 10 of the fight also winning the magazine's Round of the Year.

Only a month later, Bowe would vacate his WBC Heavyweight Championship after refusing to fight number one contender Lennox Lewis after the two sides couldn't agree on a split for the fight's $32 million purse, and as a result, this marked the last time that the Undisputed Heavyweight Championship was contested for six years and four months until Lewis and Holyfield met in 1999.

He would keep his WBA and IBF Heavyweight titles, however, and would successfully defend them in easy victories against Michael Dokes and Jesse Ferguson. The WBC would next be contested between Lewis and Tony Tucker, with Lewis getting a unanimous decision over Tucker.

After much anticipation, Bowe and Holyfield would meet in a rematch on November 6, 1993 for Bowe's Heavyweight championship. The duo again went 12 rounds with Holyfield earning the victory via majority decision.

== Undercard ==
Confirmed bouts:

== Broadcasting ==
Country	Broadcaster
Canada	TSN
France	Canal+
Philippines	GMA Network
Thailand	Channel 7
United Kingdom	Sky Sports
United States	HBO

Preceded by vs. Larry Holmes	Evander Holyfield's bouts 13 November 1992	Succeeded by vs. Alex Stewart II
Preceded by vs. Pierre Coetzer	Riddick Bowe's bouts 13 November 1992	Succeeded by vs. Michael Dokes
Awards
Preceded by Robert Quiroga vs. Akeem Anifowoshe	The Ring Fight of the Year; 1992	Succeeded by Michael Carbajal vs. Humberto González
Preceded by Aaron Davis vs.Mark Breland; Round 9	The Ring Round of the Year; Round 10; 1992	Succeeded by Terry Norris vs. Troy Waters; Round 2
Preceded by Chris Eubank vs. Michael Watson II; Round 11	KO Magazine Round of the Year; Round 10; 1992	Succeeded by Terry Norris vs. Troy Waters; Round 2
