= Riddick Bowe vs. Buster Mathis Jr. =

Professional boxing match

Raging Bowe
- Date: August 13, 1994
- Venue: Convention Hall, Atlantic City, New Jersey

Tale of the tape
Boxer	Riddick Bowe	Buster Mathis Jr.
Nickname	Big Daddy	
Hometown	Brooklyn, New York	Grand Rapids, Michigan
Purse	$1,250,000	$250,000
Pre-fight record	34–1 (29 KO)	14–0 (1) (3 KO)
Age	27 years	24 years, 4 months
Height	6 ft 5 in (196 cm)	6 ft 0 in (183 cm)
Weight	247 lb (112 kg)	224 lb (102 kg)
Style	Orthodox	Orthodox
Recognition	IBF; No. 4 Ranked Heavyweight; The Ring; No. 3 Ranked Heavyweight; Former undisputed champion	IBF; No. 7 Ranked Heavyweight; WBA; No. 8 Ranked Heavyweight; WBC; No. 15 Ranked Heavyweight

Result
- No Contest

Riddick Bowe vs. Buster Mathis Jr., billed as Raging Bowe, was a professional boxing match contested on August 13, 1994.

== Background ==
Riddick Bowe had lost his previous fight on November 6, 1993, to Evander Holyfield for the WBA and IBF heavyweight titles. With his one-year reign as champion over, Bowe's first comeback fight was announced the following month to take place on February 5, 1994, against Francois Botha. However, only a month later, Bowe, while training for the fight, suffered a cut above his left eye that required 10 stitches leading to the bout to be officially cancelled. Instead, it was announced that Bowe would meet undefeated prospect Buster Mathis, Jr. on June 11, however this fight was also cancelled when Bowe suffered a back injury. A July 15 date was then announced for the Bowe–Mathis fight, however for the third time in the year, Bowe had to again cancel a fight as he was still suffering from back issues. The fight was finally confirmed for August 13 after medication and working with fitness guru Mackie Shilstone helped Bowe recover from his injury.

== The fight ==
Bowe had little trouble with the outmatched Mathis, easily out-boxing him throughout the first 3 rounds. However, the fight ended in controversy in round four. With around a minute left in the round, Bowe hurt Mathis with a series of power punches, causing Mathis to take a knee in order to take a break. However, just after Mathis took the knee, Bowe landed a strong right hook that briefly knocked Mathis unconscious. Feeling that Mathis was in no shape to continue after the foul, referee Arthur Mercante Sr. immediately stopped the fight, though no decision was announced. Mercante and New Jersey State Athletic Control Board head Larry Hazzard would then have discussion in regards to whether the decision should be a disqualification victory for Mathis, a knockout victory for Bowe, if they should go to the judges scorecards and award whoever was ahead a victory by technical decision or declare the fight either a technical draw or no contest. After nearly 20 minutes of deliberation, the fight was finally declared a no contest.

== Aftermath ==
Bowe apologized for the foul stating that he could not tell that Mathis, who used a crouching stance and was five inches shorter than Bowe, had taken a knee.

== Undercard ==
Confirmed bouts:

== Broadcasting ==
Country	Broadcaster
United States	HBO

Preceded by vs. Evander Holyfield II	Riddick Bowe's bouts August 13, 1994	Succeeded by vs. Larry Donald
Preceded by vs. Sherman Griffin	Buster Mathis Jr.'s bouts August 13, 1994	Succeeded by vs. Mike Lee Faulkner
