= Evander Holyfield vs. Bert Cooper =

Boxing competition

The Homecoming
- Date: November 23, 1991
- Venue: Omni Coliseum, Atlanta, Georgia
- Title(s) on the line: WBA and IBF heavyweight championship

Tale of the tape
Boxer	Evander Holyfield	Bert Cooper
Nickname	The Real Deal	Smokin'
Hometown	Atlanta, Georgia, U.S.	Philadelphia, Pennsylvania, U.S.
Purse	$7,000,000	$750,000
Pre-fight record	26–0 (21 KO)	26–7 (1) (23 KO)
Age	29 years, 1 month	25 years, 10 months
Height	6 ft 2 1/2 in (189 cm)	5 ft 11 in (180 cm)
Weight	210 lb (95 kg)	215 lb (98 kg)
Style	Orthodox	Orthodox
Recognition	WBA, WBC and IBF undisputed Heavyweight Champion; The Ring; No. 1 Ranked Heavyweight; The Ring No. 4 ranked pound-for-pound fighter 2-division undisputed world champion	IBF; No. 12 Ranked Heavyweight

Result
- Holyfield wins via 7th-round TKO

Evander Holyfield vs. Bert Cooper, billed as The Homecoming, was a professional boxing match contested on November 23, 1991, for the WBA and IBF heavyweight championships.

== Background ==
Holyfield was coming off a successful defense of his Undisputed Heavyweight Championship after defeating 42-year-old former Heavyweight champion George Foreman. Meanwhile, Mike Tyson had twice defeated Donvan "Razor" Ruddock to become the number one contender to Holyfield's titles. However, the two sides had trouble working out a deal and both men's camps began to look into having their respective fighter instead face Foreman. In July 1991, it was reported that a Holyfield–Foreman rematch was agreed upon, but only a day later it was announced that Holyfield and Tyson's promoters, Dan Duva and Don King had agreed to a blockbuster deal that would see Holyfield and Tyson meet on November 8, 1991, at the MGM Grand Garden Arena in Las Vegas. In addition, Holyfield and Tyson were expected to split a then-record $45 million purse with the champion Holyfield reportedly to earn $30 million, while the challenger Tyson would net $15 million. Unfortunately, a rib injury that Tyson had suffered, as well as his arrest and conviction for the alleged rape of Desiree Washington shortly after led to the fight being postponed and eventually cancelled. With Holyfield in need of an opponent, a match between Holyfield and former WBO Heavyweight champion Francesco Damiani was announced, with the bout to take place on November 23 in Holyfield's native Atlanta.

Only days before the Holyfield–Damiani fight was to take place, it was announced that Damiani would pull out of the match due to a foot injury he received while training. It was then announced that journeyman Bert Cooper would be Damiani's replacement to challenge Holyfield. As Cooper was unranked by the WBC, the organization refused to sanction the match, thus Holyfield's WBC title was not on the line.

== The fights ==
=== Undercard ===
On the untelevised portion of the card, former WBO Light Heavyweight titleholder Michael Moorer faced Bobby Crabtree, who didn't come out for the second round.

=== Lewis vs Biggs ===
The Homecoming: Lennox Lewis vs. Tyrell Biggs
Tale of the tape
Boxer	Lennox Lewis	Tyrell Biggs
Nickname	The Lion	The TV Terror
Hometown	West Ham, London, U.K.	Philadelphia, Pennsylvania, U.S.
Pre-fight record	17–0 (15 KO)	19–4 (12 KO)
Age	26 years, 2 months	30 years, 11 months
Height	6 ft 5 in (196 cm)	6 ft 5 in (196 cm)
Weight	230 1/2 lb (105 kg)	231 lb (105 kg)
Style	Orthodox	Orthodox
Recognition	WBA; No. 3 Ranked Heavyweight; IBF; No. 5 Ranked Heavyweight; WBC; No. 6 Ranked Heavyweight; The Ring; No. 9 Ranked Heavyweight	1984 Olympic Super heavyweight Gold Medallist

Result
- Lewis defeated Biggs by 3rd round TKO

In the chief support, rising contender Lennox Lewis faced former world title challenger and fellow Olympic gold medallist Tyrell Biggs. Lewis was having only his third bout in the States, while Biggs was coming off a competitive showing against Lewis' Olympic rival Riddick Bowe.

The two had faced off in the Quarter Finals of the 1984 Olympics with Biggs taking the win on points 5–0. This was the first heavyweight bout between two Olympic gold medallists since the rematch between George Foreman and Joe Frazier.

After two relatively uneventful rounds, Lewis knocked down Biggs with a right cross with less than a minute left in the third round. Biggs beat the count, but he was down twice more with the third knockout prompting the referee to wave it off.

=== Main Event ===
Though Cooper was given little chance to defeat Holyfield, he nevertheless put on a decent showing against the champion. In the first round, Holyfield used his speed to take advantage of Cooper, consistently hitting him with several quick combinations. A little past midway through the round, Holyfield hit Cooper with a left hook to the body that dropped him to the canvas, though Cooper quickly got up and survived the rest of the round. After a solid second round from both fighters, Holyfield came out strong in the opening seconds of round 3, staggering Cooper with a left hook to the side of the head. As the first minute of the round was coming to a close, Cooper landed a right hand to Holyfield's head that staggered the champ. Cooper then got Holyfield against the ropes and landed a combination that included a right hand to the back of Holyfield's head. Before Holyfield could fall to the canvas, he grabbed the top rope to keep himself up. Despite not hitting the floor, referee Mills Lane called it a knockdown, the first of Holyfield's professional career. Cooper continued his attack on Holyfield, landing several powerful punches and nearly knocking him down again, but Holyfield held on to Cooper just as he was about to go down. As the second minute passed, Holyfield regained his form and proceeded to land a powerful combination of his own. The two men traded punches for nearly the entire final minute of the round, but both men survived without any further knockdowns. After three more rounds, Holyfield ended the fight late in round 7. With 20 seconds to go in the round, Holyfield hit Cooper with a long combination. Though Cooper never went down, he could no longer defend himself, causing Lane to stop the fight with two seconds left in the round and award Holyfield the victory via technical knockout.

== Aftermath ==
Holyfield had hoped to fight Tyson next, however, on February 10, 1992, Tyson was convicted of rape and sentenced to six years in prison. As a result on 5 March it was announced that Holyfield's next opponent would be 42-year-old former Heavyweight champion Larry Holmes.

== Undercard ==
Confirmed bouts:

== Broadcasting ==
Country	Broadcaster
United Kingdom	BBC
United States	HBO

Preceded by vs. George Foreman	Evander Holyfield's bouts 23 November 1991	Succeeded by vs. Larry Holmes
Preceded by vs. Joe Hipp	Bert Cooper's bouts 23 November 1991	Succeeded by vs. Cecil Coffee
