= James Toney vs. Mike McCallum =

Boxing match

- Date: December 13, 1991
- Venue: Convention Hall, Atlantic City, New Jersey, U.S.
- Title(s) on the line: IBF middleweight title

Tale of the tape
Boxer	James Toney	Mike McCallum
Nickname	Lights Out	The Body Snatcher
Hometown	Grand Rapids, Michigan, U.S.	Kingston, Surrey, Jamaica
Purse	$475,000	$500,000
Pre-fight record	28–0–1 (20 KO)	42–1 (34 KO)
Age	23 years, 3 months	35 years
Height	5 ft 9 in (175 cm)	5 ft 11 1/2 in (182 cm)
Weight	159 lb (72 kg)	157 3/4 lb (72 kg)
Style	Orthodox	Orthodox
Recognition	IBF; Middleweight Champion; The Ring; No. 2 Ranked Middleweight	The Ring; No. 1 Ranked Middleweight; 2-division World Champion

Result
- Split draw (115–113, 112–116, 114–114)

James Toney vs. Mike McCallum was a professional boxing match contested on December 13, 1991, for the IBF middleweight title.

== Background ==
Promoter Bob Arum, looking to begin the process of unifying the three major world titles in order to crown an undisputed middleweight champion, organized a unification bout between reigning IBF middleweight champion James Toney and WBA middleweight champion Mike McCallum. However, these plans were derailed when the WBA stepped in, refused to sanction Toney–McCallum fight and ordered that McCallum instead defend his title against mandatory challenger Steve Collins, whom McCallum had soundly defeated the previous year. McCallum asked the WBA for an exception to purse Toney, but the WBA requested McCallum pay them $30,000 from his purse, an additional $35,000 for an exception fee and finally $50,000 to Collins' manager in order for them to allow him to face Toney first. McCallum declined the WBA's terms and instead opted to continue on with his fight against Toney, allowing the WBA to strip him of the title. The vacant WBA middleweight title would be decided the following April with the number-one ranked Collins facing number-two contender Reggie Johnson with Johnson winning by majority decision.

== The fight ==
In a closely contested fight, Toney and McCallum fought to a split draw with one judge scoring the fight in Toney's favor 116–112, the other scoring the fight for McCallum 115–113 and the third scoring it even 114–114. Though the fight was close, Toney seemed to land the harder punches, especially in the later rounds, while McCallum was effective in the early portion of the fight and had a lead on two of the scorecards before Toney rallied to take the final three rounds to secure a draw and keep his title. Toney came close to ending the fight in the 12th and final round, hammering McCallum twice with left hooks that dislodged McCallum's mouthpiece and left him on wobbly legs, though McCallum was able to survive the round. The two fighters were almost even in landed punches, with McCallum scoring 343 of his 890 thrown punches and Toney landing 340 of his 823 punches.

== Aftermath ==
At the post-fight press conference, an altercation erupted between Toney and McCallum's lawyer Milt Chawsky. After Bob Arum suggested Toney had been robbed by the judges, Chawsky took exception telling Arum "I'm not going to let you disrespect my fighter." Toney, taking exception to Chawsky's interjection exchanged words with Chawsky and had to be restrained by security to prevent him from physically confronting him. A rematch between Toney and McCallum would take place the following year on August 29, 1992.

== Fight card ==
Confirmed bouts:

Weight Class	Weight		vs.		Method	Round	Notes
Middleweight	160 lbs.	James Toney	vs.	Mike McCallum	D	12/12	^{Note 1}
Welterweight	147 lbs.	Charles Murray	def	Livingstone Bramble	UD	10/10
Super Middleweight	168 lbs.	Bernard Hopkins	def.	Willie Kemp	UD	10/10
Heavyweight	200+ lbs.	Riddick Bowe	def.	Elijah Tillery	TKO	4/10

^Note 1 For IBF middleweight title

== Broadcasting ==
Country	Broadcaster
United Kingdom	Sky Sports
United States	HBO

Preceded by vs. Francesco Dell'Aquila	James Toney's bouts 13 December 1991	Succeeded by vs. Dave Tiberi
Preceded by vs. Nicky Walker	Mike McCallum's bouts 13 December 1991	Succeeded by vs. Fermin Chirino
