= Evander Holyfield vs. Larry Holmes =

Boxing match

Class of Champions
- Date: June 19, 1992
- Venue: Caesars Palace, Paradise, Nevada, U.S.
- Title(s) on the line: WBA, WBC and IBF undisputed heavyweight championship

Tale of the tape
Boxer	Evander Holyfield	Larry Holmes
Nickname	The Real Deal	The Easton Assassin
Hometown	Atlanta, Georgia, U.S.	Easton, Pennsylvania, U.S.
Purse	$16,000,000 to $18,000,000	$7,500,000 (Est)
Pre-fight record	27–0 (22 KO)	54–3 (37 KO)
Age	29 years, 8 months	42 years, 7 months
Height	6 ft 2 1/2 in (189 cm)	6 ft 3 in (191 cm)
Weight	210 lb (95 kg)	233 lb (106 kg)
Style	Orthodox	Orthodox
Recognition	WBA, WBC and IBF undisputed Heavyweight Champion; The Ring; No. 1 Ranked Heavyweight; The Ring pound-for-pound No. 4 ranked fighter 2-division undisputed world champion	WBC; No. 6 Ranked Heavyweight; WBA; No. 7 Ranked Heavyweight; IBF; No. 8 Ranked Heavyweight; The Ring; No. 4 Ranked Heavyweight; Former heavyweight champion

Result
- Holyfield wins via 12-round unanimous decision (117–111, 116–112, 116–112)

Evander Holyfield vs. Larry Holmes, billed as Class of Champions, was a professional boxing match contested on June 19, 1992, for the undisputed heavyweight championship.

== Background ==
Holyfield's previous fight was a tough victory over journeyman fighter Bert Cooper, who was a last-minute replacement for Francesco Damiani, who himself was a replacement for Mike Tyson, after Damiani determined that he could not compete due to a foot injury. Cooper nearly managed to dethrone Holyfield of his title in the third round when he was able to deliver the first knockdown of Holyfield's professional career. Holyfield, however, was able to rebound from the knockdown to earn the victory via 7th-round technical knockout. After his defeat of Cooper, Holyfield had hoped to next fight Tyson. The two men were originally scheduled to fight each other on November 8, 1991, before Tyson pulled out of the fight with a rib injury. Then on February 10, 1992, Tyson was convicted of rape and sentenced to six years in prison, leading to the cancellation of the Holyfield–Tyson fight. On March 5, 1992, it was announced that Holyfield's next opponent would be 42-year-old former Heavyweight champion Larry Holmes. Holmes had twice retired, first after losing a rematch to Michael Spinks in 1986 for the IBF Heavyweight Championship, and then again after a loss to Mike Tyson in 1988 for the Undisputed Heavyweight Championship. In 1991, Holmes launched a successful comeback, winning five consecutive fights before facing undefeated Olympic Gold Medalist Ray Mercer in a match to determine the number one contender. Though Holmes came into the fight as an underdog, he was able to outpoint Mercer en route to a victory by unanimous decision.

== The fight ==
Holyfield was able to control most of the fight as Holmes took a more defensive approach. Holmes' best offensive showing came in round 2 when he was able to hit Holyfield with a combination of uppercuts and hooks in the second minute of the round. Holmes was also able to open a cut above Holyfield's right eye after catching him with an elbow following a missed right hand. Nevertheless, Holyfield was the aggressor for the entire duration of the fight with Holmes spending most of the fight seemingly trying to avoid trading punches with Holyfield. Ultimately, neither man was able gain a knockdown throughout the relatively uneventful fight. In what was surely not intended as a reflection on the evening's proceedings, Holmes vomited as the final bell rang.

After the full 12 rounds, Evander Holyfield was awarded a unanimous decision victory with two scores of 116–112 and one score of 117–111. HBO's unofficial scorer Harold Lederman scored the fight 115-113 while the Associated Press scored the bout 116-111 both for Holyfield.

== Aftermath ==
Holyfield would next face arguably his toughest opponent, the undefeated Riddick Bowe. In what was named The Ring magazine's Fight of the Year, Riddick Bowe was able to defeat Holyfield by a close unanimous decision to become the new Undisputed Heavyweight Champion.

Though it was not known if Holmes would continue to fight after his loss to Holyfield, he ultimately decided to continue his comeback, racking up seven consecutive victories after the Holyfield defeat to earn another chance at a major heavyweight title, this time facing Oliver McCall for the WBC Heavyweight Championship on April 8, 1995. Though he was again able to go the full 12 rounds, he was unable to pick up the victory, instead losing to McCall by another unanimous decision.

== Undercard ==
Confirmed bouts:

== Broadcasting ==
Country	Broadcaster
United Kingdom	Sky Sports
United States	HBO

Preceded by vs. Bert Cooper	Evander Holyfield's bouts 19 June 1992	Succeeded by vs. Riddick Bowe
Preceded by vs. Ray Mercer	Larry Holmes's bouts 19 June 1992	Succeeded by vs. Everett Martin
