= Elijah Tillery =

American boxer (born 1957)

Personal information
- Nickname: Phoenix Steel
- Born: Carlton Elijah Tillery; August 8, 1957 (age 69) Albany, New York, U.S.
- Weight: Heavyweight

Boxing career
- Stance: Orthodox

Boxing record
- Total fights: 30
- Wins: 23
- Win by KO: 15
- Losses: 7

Carlton Elijah Tillery (born August 8, 1957) is an American former professional boxer who competed in the cruiserweight and heavyweight divisions. He was nicknamed "Phoenix Steel".

== Amateur career ==
Born in Albany, New York, Tillery compiled an amateur record of 45 wins and 2 losses.

== Professional career ==
Tillery turned professional in 1980 and was known as a hard-punching journeyman in the heavyweight division. He is best known for his two fights against Riddick Bowe in 1991. His first bout with Bowe is known for its bizarre conclusion. Bowe dominated the first round and dropped Tillery. After the round ended, Tillery walked toward Bowe and taunted him, and Bowe responded by punching Tillery. Tillery responded by kicking Bowe, after which Bowe unleashed a flurry of punches while Tillery was against the ropes. Bowe's trainer, Rock Newman, then pulled Tillery over the ropes as Bowe continued to throw punches. Tillery somersaulted over the ropes and was quickly detained by security. After the order was restored and the fighters returned to the ring, Tillery and Bowe continued a war of words, and there continued to be minor incidents as the ring was cleared. Tillery was disqualified for the kicks with Bowe getting the win, much to the surprise of the television announcers. The fighters rematched two months later, with Bowe dominating and TKO'ing Tillery, his first TKO loss. Tillery's final professional bout was a TKO loss to James Smith two years after his rematch with Bowe.

== Professional boxing record ==
23 Wins (15 knockouts, 8 decisions), 7 Losses (2 knockouts, 5 decisions)
Result	Record	Opponent	Type	Round	Date	Location	Notes
Loss	36-11-1	James Smith	TKO	6	14/09/1993	Atlantic City, New Jersey, U.S.	Referee stopped the bout at 2:51 of the sixth round.
Loss	27-0	Riddick Bowe	TKO	4	Dec 13, 1991	Atlantic City, New Jersey, U.S.	Referee stopped the bout at 1:14 of the fourth round.
Loss	26-0	Riddick Bowe	DQ	1	29/10/1991	Washington, D.C., U.S.	For vacant WBC Continental Americas heavyweight title
Loss	17-2-1	Art Tucker	UD	10	02/11/1990	Albany, New York, U.S.	
Win	8-5-1	William Morris	MD	10	17/08/1990	Newark, New Jersey, U.S.	
Win	7-1	Fred Whitaker	RTD	4	08/07/1990	Atlantic City, New Jersey, U.S.	
Win	5-0	Mike Dixon	UD	6	08/05/1990	Atlantic City, New Jersey, U.S.	
Win	12-6-1	Dorcey Gaymon	UD	8	Jun 15, 1987	Atlantic City, New Jersey, U.S.	
Win	21-10	Mike Cohen	KO	3	23/08/1986	Fayetteville, North Carolina, U.S.	
Win	19-8	David Jaco	KO	9	11/07/1986	Swan Lake, New York, U.S.	
Win	3-10-1	Wesley Smith	TKO	8	31/05/1986	Albany, New York, U.S.	
Win	13-2	Rodney Frazier	KO	4	05/04/1986	Latham, New York, U.S.	
Loss	16-2	Anthony Davis	UD	12	19/09/1984	Winchester, Nevada, U.S.	For NABF cruiserweight title
Win	11-2	William Hosea	PTS	10	09/08/1983	Atlantic City, New Jersey, U.S.	
Win	3-4-2	Louis Alexander	KO	1	15/04/1983	New York City, New York, U.S.	
Win	4-5	Charles Vanderhall	KO	2	10/11/1982	Latham, New York, U.S.	Charles knocked out at 2:53 of the second round.
Loss	13-1	Alfonzo Ratliff	UD	10	13/03/1982	Atlantic City, New Jersey, U.S.	
Win	6-14	Henry Patterson	TKO	3	11/02/1982	Philadelphia, Pennsylvania, U.S.	
Loss	2-2-2	Quadir Muntaqim	UD	8	07/11/1981	Atlantic City, New Jersey, U.S.	
Win	4-9	Eddie Smith	PTS	8	24/07/1981	New York City, New York, U.S.	
Win	6-26-2	Kid Samson	PTS	8	25/06/1981	Tarrytown, New York, U.S.	
Win	15-15-2	Fred Brown	UD	6	11/05/1981	New York City, New York, U.S.	
Win	0-5	Milton Hopkins	KO	1	18/03/1981	White Plains, New York, U.S.	
Win	0-1	Johnny Pitts	KO	2	08/03/1981	Atlantic City, New Jersey, U.S.	
Win	--	Vincent Johnson	KO	1	28/02/1981	Atlantic City, New Jersey, U.S.	
Win	2-9-1	Calvin Langston	KO	1	18/02/1981	White Plains, New York, U.S.	
Win	6-23-2	Kid Samson	PTS	4	07/02/1981	Atlantic City, New Jersey, U.S.	
Win	--	Kasim Stephenson	KO	1	07/01/1981	New York City, New York, U.S.	
Win	0-1	Austin Johnson	KO	1	12/12/1980	New York City, New York, U.S.	
Win	--	Gerald Hardy	KO	1	23/10/1980	New York City, New York, U.S.	Hardy knocked out at 1:19 of the first round.
