= Riddick Bowe vs. Andrew Golota =

1996 boxing match

Big Daddy's Home
- Date: July 11, 1996
- Venue: Madison Square Garden, New York City, New York, US

Tale of the tape
| Boxer | Riddick Bowe | Andrew Golota |
| Nickname | Big Daddy | |
| Hometown | Brooklyn, New York, US | Warsaw, Masovian, Poland |
| Purse | $2,000,000 | $600,000 |
| Pre-fight record | 38–1 (1) (32 KO) | 28–0 (25 KO) |
| Age | 28 years, 11 months | 28 years, 6 months |
| Height | 6 ft 5 in (196 cm) | 6 ft 4 in (193 cm) |
| Weight | 252 lb (114 kg) | 243 lb (110 kg) |
| Style | Orthodox | Orthodox |
| Recognition | The Ring; No. 1 Ranked Heavyweight; The Ring No. 10 ranked pound-for-pound fighter Former Undisputed Champion | IBF; No. 7 Ranked Heavyweight; WBA; No. 8 Ranked Heavyweight; WBC; No. 9 Ranked Heavyweight |

Result
- Bowe wins via 7th round disqualification

Riddick Bowe vs. Andrew Golota, billed as "Big Daddy's Home", was a professional boxing match contested on July 11, 1996. The fight was held at Madison Square Garden in New York City and was televised on HBO (as part of its World Championship Boxing series) in the United States, and on Sky Sports in the United Kingdom.

The fight ended in the seventh round when referee Wayne Kelly stopped the fight and gave Bowe a victory by disqualification after Golota, who had landed several punches below Bowe's beltline over the course of the fight, chose to ignore his repeated warnings about keeping his punches above the belt. After the fight, multiple massive brawls broke out, both in and around the ring, which led to several arrests.

== Background ==
Bowe was looking to get himself back into the mix for the world heavyweight championship as 1996 began. Since losing his World Boxing Association and International Boxing Federation championships back to Evander Holyfield in their second fight, Bowe had gone through five comeback fights and won four of them. In the other fight, Bowe fought Buster Mathis Jr. to a no contest when Mathis was unable to continue after Bowe hit him while he was down.

On March 11, 1995, Bowe defeated Herbie Hide for the World Boxing Organization heavyweight championship, which at the time was not as widely recognized as it is in modern day boxing. He defended it successfully once by knocking out Jorge Luis Gonzalez, then elected to pursue a third fight with Holyfield that was non-title; Bowe knocked Holyfield out in the eighth round to end their trilogy with a second win. He would reign as WBO champion until May of 1996 when he relinquished the belt.

Meanwhile, a former rival of Bowe's was also looking to get himself back into title contention. After Bowe defeated Holyfield in their first fight in 1992 to claim what was then the undisputed world heavyweight championship, the World Boxing Council ordered him to make a mandatory defense of its championship against Lennox Lewis, who had defeated Bowe at the Olympics four years earlier to win the super heavyweight gold medal. Bowe refused to do so and announced he would be relinquishing the WBC championship, symbolically depositing the belt in a waste basket. Lewis was awarded the championship in January of 1993 and held it until September of 1994, when he was knocked out by Oliver McCall under controversial circumstances. McCall made a successful defense against former champion Larry Holmes in his first fight but lost to Lewis' countryman Frank Bruno in his next defense. Bruno, as per the terms of the fight contract negotiated by McCall’s promoter Don King, was required to defend the WBC title against former undisputed champion Mike Tyson, another King client, immediately after. Lewis sued to try to get the fight cancelled and force Bruno, whom he had beaten in 1993 by technical knockout, to defend the title against him due to his number one contender status, but was unsuccessful. Tyson, in only his third fight since being released from prison, knocked Bruno out on March 16, 1996 to regain the WBC title and Lewis was to be his mandatory challenger.

While this was going on, Tyson and King were also trying to pursue a title unification fight with then-WBA champion Bruce Seldon, who had won the title in April 1995 by beating former champion Tony Tucker in a bout set up after George Foreman, the lineal world champion, was stripped of the title for refusing to fight Tucker. Tyson and Lewis’ camps agreed to let Tyson pursue the fight with Seldon, which left Lewis looking for a new opponent. He and Bowe agreed to finally step in the ring against each other, with the bout tentatively scheduled to take place in sometime in fall 1996.

In the interim, Lewis and Bowe each agreed to take tuneup fights that would be carried by HBO. Lewis won his tuneup fight on May 10, 1996 against former WBO world champion Ray Mercer by a disputed majority decision at Madison Square Garden. Bowe elected to take on undefeated Polish heavyweight Andrew Golota, the 1988 bronze medalist who had won most of his fights by knockout but who had yet to fight a big name contender in his career. He entered 1996 ranked inside the top ten by the WBC and IBF. Golota was also infamous in boxing circles for his frequent fouls during matches, including an incident where he bit Samson Po'uha in the neck.

Prior to the match, the confident Bowe declared himself "The People's Champion" and paid little attention to Golota, instead looking ahead to his long-awaited bout with Lewis and a potential superfight with Tyson. Though Bowe entered the fight at a career high 252 pounds, 12 pounds heavier than what he weighed in his previous match with Holyfield, he nevertheless was made a 12–1 favorite. When explaining his weight gain, Bowe made it clear that he had not trained much for Golota, infamously asking "How do you train for a bum?" Golota's trainer Lou Duva remained confident that his fighter could defeat Bowe, saying of Bowe's weight gain: "He's everything I want him to be.”

== The Fight ==
In the opening round, Golota took advantage of Bowe being overweight and came out firing. Golota was able to land his jab at a constant rate and landed nearly half of his 69 punches in the first round while Bowe was only able to land 17. The two men would have a close round 2 with both men landing powerful shots on one another, but Golota regained control in round 3 and pushed the action further in round 4. Bowe was looking overmatched and an upset was becoming more and more likely for the Polish contender as the fight progressed. Bowe did not have an answer for Golota and was clearly out of shape and struggling as the fight advanced into the middle rounds.

Bowe, however, was able to remain close on the scorecards as Golota repeatedly landed punches that were close to being below the beltline. Referee Wayne Kelly issued two warnings to Golota for shots below Bowe's waist in the second round, then deducted a point from him in the fourth round after a third low punch dropped Bowe to the canvas. Bowe was given five minutes to recover but only needed three and the fight continued.

Towards the end of the sixth round, Golota again managed to hit Bowe with a low blow. Kelly deducted a second point and threatened to disqualify Golota if he did it again. The sixth concluded without any further incidents, but in the seventh Golota landed two more low blows on Bowe. As he fell to the canvas after the sixth and final low punch, Kelly finally decided to stop the fight and award Bowe the victory by disqualification.

== Post-fight riot ==
Where are we, America? Why do we have so much trouble handling public events?

— Jim Lampley's final remarks on the HBO telecast.

Immediately after the fight was stopped, members of Bowe's security team entered the ring and approached Golota, who had his back turned as he was going back to his corner. One of the men pushed Golota from behind which caused Golota to respond by throwing punches at the man. Another man, later identified as Jason Harris, began hitting Golota in the head with a walkie-talkie, opening up a cut that required 11 stitches to close. Golota's trainer, 74-year-old Lou Duva, was also injured in the melee and collapsed to the canvas after experiencing chest pains and ultimately had to be taken from the ring on a stretcher. Eventually, fans of both boxers entered the brawl and would continue to trade punches with each other and the entourages inside the ring as well as outside of it.

Sky Sports announcers Ian Darke and Glenn McCrory merely ducked at ringside for their own protection, with Darke also making mention of beverage cups being thrown from the balconies of the venue. The HBO announcers were more active in the situation, as the riot's dismantling of the HBO announcers' table prompted commentator Jim Lampley to move up a couple levels of Madison Square Garden while his colleagues Larry Merchant and George Foreman stayed at ringside. Foreman even tried to stop the riot in the ring himself by saving Lampley and Merchant from fans attacking them, as well as discouraging other fans from entering the ring and attacking anyone.

While the HBO and Sky Sports announcers never interacted with each other on air, both sides lamented on the lack of security present at Madison Square Garden during the riot; it was as the ending credits began to roll on the HBO telecast that the police were finally shown arriving at the scene to make apprehensions. In the end, 10 arrests were made, eight officers were injured and nine spectators had to be hospitalized.

== Aftermath ==
Bowe's potential match with Lennox Lewis was scuttled after this fight due to his poor performance. Since there was interest in another fight with Golota, Bowe and his team decided to go in that direction instead. In October 1996, three months after their first match, it was announced that Bowe and Golota would meet again in a rematch that would take place on December 14 in Atlantic City, New Jersey. Bowe admitted that Golota had humiliated him in their previous fight and vowed to be ready for their rematch. The rematch was much the same as their first encounter, with Golota outperforming Bowe but losing by disqualification because he was not able to stop hitting Bowe below the belt. After his second consecutive poor performance, Riddick Bowe would announce his retirement from boxing at the age of 29. Adding insult to injury, Lewis would seek out Golota for a fight to defend the WBC championship he had regained, which is what Bowe was looking for; Golota suffered a knockout in the first round.

== Undercard ==
Confirmed bouts:

== Broadcasting ==
| Country | Broadcaster |
|---|---|
| Mexico | Televisa |
| Poland | FilmNet |
| United Kingdom | Sky Sports |
| United States | HBO |

| Preceded by vs. Evander Holyfield III | Riddick Bowe's bouts July 11, 1996 | Succeeded by Rematch |
| Preceded by vs. Danell Nicholson | Andrew Golota's bouts July 11, 1996 | Succeeded by Rematch |
