= Riddick Bowe vs. Pierre Coetzer =

Boxing match

- Date: July 18, 1992
- Venue: The Mirage, Paradise, Nevada, U.S.
- Title(s) on the line: WBA and IBF heavyweight title eliminator

Tale of the tape
Boxer	Riddick Bowe	Pierre Coetzer
Nickname	Big Daddy	
Hometown	Brooklyn, New York, U.S.	Pretoria, Gauteng, South Africa
Purse	$180,000	$100,000
Pre-fight record	30–0 (26 KO)	39–2 (27 KO)
Age	24 years, 11 months	30 years, 7 months
Height	6 ft 5 in (196 cm)	6 ft 4 in (193 cm)
Weight	245 lb (111 kg)	215 lb (98 kg)
Style	Orthodox	Orthodox
Recognition	WBA/The Ring; No. 2 Ranked Heavyweight; WBC/IBF; No. 3 Ranked Heavyweight	WBA; No. 1 Ranked Heavyweight; IBF; No. 2 Ranked Heavyweight

Result
- Bowe wins via 7th-round technical knockout

Riddick Bowe vs. Pierre Coetzer was a professional boxing match contested on July 18, 1992.

== Background ==
24–year old Riddick Bowe, having amassed a 28–0 record, had risen to become a top contender in the heavyweight division and was in negotiations in early 1992 to face undisputed heavyweight champion Evander Holyfield after Holyfield's planned next opponent Mike Tyson was convicted of rape and sent to prison in March, forcing Holyfield to seek a new opponent. Holyfield's manager Shelly Finkel had offered Bowe around $7,000,000 to challenge Holyfield, but fight fell through for the time being when Bowe's manager Rock Newman requested more money for Bowe, leading to Holyfield facing ageing former heavyweight champion Larry Holmes instead.

Bowe would win his next two fights against unheralded opponents to bring his record up to 30–0 before a deal was reached in May that would see Bowe meet Pierre Coetzer, the WBA's number-one ranked heavyweight contender, in an eliminator bout set for July 18, 1992. The winner would then meet Holyfield that fall provided he get past Holmes in June. Holyfield would defeat Holmes by unanimous decision, officially setting up a title fight between himself and either Bowe or Coetzer.

As Coetzer was largely unknown in the United States and Bowe was still an up-and-comer in the heavyweight division, HBO sports head Seth Abraham paired the Bowe–Coetzer fight with an IBF junior welterweight title fight between champion Rafael Pineda and challenger Pernell Whitaker. Though the Bowe–Coetzer fight was the featured bout, the Pineda–Whitaker fight was given the main event slot on the basis of it being a championship fight.

== The fights ==
=== Bowe vs. Coetzer ===
The fight was a slugfest as both fighters landed big punches and traded heavy blows throughout the fight. Though Coetzer was a game opponent and absorbed a lot of punishment, Bowe got the better of most of their exchanges, opening cuts below both of Coetzer's eyes and badly bruising his face.

By the seventh round, Bowe had built up a lead on all three scorecards, winning 58–55 on two of them and holding a narrow 57–56 lead on the third. The two fighters continued to land punches on one another before the fight ended suddenly and with controversy during the waning seconds of the seventh round. With the two fighters fighting in close quarters, Bowe landed a right-handed low blow which caused Coetzer to turn away with his hands down in anticipation that referee Mills Lane would step in and penalize Bowe for the infraction as he had the previous round, however, Lane would not step, leaving Coetzer defenseless as Bowe scored consecutive blows that sent Coetzer crashing into the ropes. As Coetzer was slumped against the ropes, Bowe landed several more blows before Lane stepped in an ended the fight with a single second remaining in the round.

=== Pineda vs. Whitaker ===
The main event saw Rafael Pineda make the 2nd defence of his IBF light welterweight title against No. 1 contender and former undisputed lightweight champion Pernell Whitaker.

Whitaker was a 6-1 on favorite to win.

==== The fight ====
Pineda had points deducted in round 6 and 8 for low blows. Whitaker would score a knockdown in round 8 with a right hook to the body.

Whitaker would defeat Pineda by wide unanimous decision, with two scores of 117–108 and one of 116–109.

Whitaker landed 321 of 787 total punches (40.8%), while Pineda connected on 206 of 700 (29.4%)

Preceded by vs. Clarence Coleman	Rafael Pineda's bouts 18 July 1992	Succeeded by vs. Victor Ochoa
Preceded by vs. Jerry Smith	Pernell Whitaker's bouts 18 July 1992	Succeeded by vs. Ben Baez

== Fight card ==
Confirmed bouts:

Weight Class	Weight		vs.		Method	Round	Notes
Junior Welterweight	140 lbs.	Pernell Whitaker	def.	Rafael Pineda (c)	UD	12/12	^{note 1}
Heavyweight	200+ lbs.	Riddick Bowe	def.	Pierre Coetzer	TKO	7/12	^{note 2}
Heavyweight	200+ lbs.	Dwight Muhammad Qawi	def.	Dave Fiddler	TKO	2/8
Super Featherweight	130 lbs.	Eddie Hopson	def.	Tony Duran	UD	8/8
Cruiserweight	190 lbs.	Egerton Marcus	def.	Mike Garcia	TKO	1/6

^Note 1 For IBF Junior Welterweight Title
^Note 2 WBA Heavyweight Title Eliminator

== Broadcasting ==
Country	Broadcaster
United States	HBO

Preceded by vs. Everett Martin	Riddick Bowe's bouts 18 July 1992	Succeeded by vs. Evander Holyfield
Preceded by vs. Carlton West	Pierre Coetzer's bouts 18 July 1992	Succeeded by vs. Frank Bruno
