= James Miller (parachutist) =

American parachutist and paraglider pilot

- Born: James Jarret Miller; October 28, 1963; Havre de Grace, Maryland, U.S.
- Died: c. 22 September 2002 (aged 38); Kenai Peninsula, Alaska
- Education: University of Alaska at Juneau
- Children: 1

James Jarrett Miller (October 28, 1963 – c. 22 September 2002), also known as the Fan Man, was an American parachutist and paraglider pilot known for his appearances at various sporting events. His most infamous appearance occurred on November 6, 1993, during a heavyweight boxing match between Evander Holyfield and Riddick Bowe at Caesars Palace in Las Vegas, Nevada. Miller made headlines in the United States when he used his powered paraglider to fly into the arena, eventually crashing into the side of the ring.

Miller went missing in 2002 and was found dead in 2003; his death was ruled a suicide by hanging. A year prior, he had been diagnosed with coronary artery disease, which prevented him from flying or hiking. This diagnosis, combined with the closure of his computer business due to mounting medical debts, reportedly contributed to his declining mental health.

== Background ==
Miller was born in Havre de Grace, Maryland. He had three younger brothers and two younger sisters. In 1975, the Miller family moved to a country home near the Canada–United States border. The following year, the family relocated to Tok, Alaska. Miller later earned an associate degree in computer programming from the University of Alaska at Juneau. In the late 1980s, he moved to Las Vegas where he was introduced to paragliders.

Miller had been interested in flying since childhood and quickly became a paragliding enthusiast. He started with a jetpack tied to his back, and moved up to two-cycle aircraft engines which powered him through the skies above the desert. He began setting power-gliding records for altitude and distance, with a reputation for reckless daring.

== The Fan Man fight ==
Miller's first and most famous stunt happened on November 6, 1993, during the heavyweight title fight between Riddick Bowe and Evander Holyfield. Miller descended into the side of the ring area during the second minute of the seventh round of the fight, after circling Caesars Palace for ten minutes. The lines of his paraglider became tangled in the overhead lights, after which he landed on the top rope of the ring with his parachute still tangled in the lights. He tried to hang on with one foot and one hand on that top rope for a few seconds until he either fell or was dragged down into the crowd by spectators, his parachute ripping away from the lights above.

Fans and the fighters' security detail swarmed around him immediately and began attacking him. He was knocked unconscious during the attack. One security officer reportedly struck Miller twenty times. He was rushed to a nearby hospital as spectators cut his paraglider into pieces for souvenirs. After his release from the hospital, Miller was taken to the Clark County Detention Center, where he was charged with dangerous flying and released on $200 bail. In an exclusive interview with British journalists after the bout, Miller categorized his ring crash as accidental and not intentional, claiming it was caused by mechanical problems. Miller later joked, "It was a heavyweight fight and I was the only guy who got knocked out."

The media immediately dubbed Miller "Fan Man," for the paramotor (lightweight engine and propeller) attached to his harness.

== Other stunts ==
On January 9, 1994, Miller circled approximately 1,000 feet over the rim of the Los Angeles Memorial Coliseum on his paraglider during the Denver Broncos–Los Angeles Raiders NFL playoff game. He landed in a park north of the Coliseum where he was arrested for interfering with a sporting event. Later that same month, he "buzzed", (flew low over), a Bolton Wanderers–Arsenal Premier League match at Burnden Park in Bolton, England. After serving a seven-day prison sentence, Miller was deported by British authorities.

On February 5 he was witnessed by British police paragliding along The Mall before landing atop Buckingham Palace. He then removed his trousers revealing that he was painted green from the waist down. He was arrested without incident, fined £200 and was again deported. He was banned from reentering the UK for life.

When asked by reporters what his motives were for staging these stunts, Miller never gave clear answers. He claimed that he intentionally landed in the ring to break up the Bowe vs. Holyfield match, claiming he was opposed to violence. Miller's younger brother later said Miller staged the stunts because, "He was basically bucking society. He was mocking our rules, making up his own as he went along, kind of just making a mockery of our society and the way it works and what our expectations are."

== Later years and death ==
After returning to the United States, Miller received death threats for interrupting sporting events. In 1996, he relocated to Valdez, Alaska where he lived in a dry cabin. He continued to fly ultralight aircraft and paragliders in the Alaskan wilderness and also gave lessons. Miller briefly worked for a computer company before opening his own computer business. In 2001, he was diagnosed with coronary artery disease and underwent double bypass surgery. There were complications and Miller developed health issues. He underwent two additional surgeries to correct issues caused by the first surgery, but continued to experience constant chest pain and ill health. Miller was unable to continue flying, paragliding and hiking because of his declining health. Due to mounting debts from medical bills, Miller was forced to close his computer business. He moved to Anchorage in 2002, where he worked for a utility company.

On 22 September 2002, Miller was reported missing after he disappeared earlier that morning while driving to the wilderness. His car was found near the Resurrection Pass Trail in Chugach National Forest on the Kenai Peninsula. A search was launched but was suspended on October 13. On March 9, 2003, a group of hunters bushwhacking through the woods on the peninsula found Miller's decomposing body. An autopsy revealed that Miller had hanged himself from a tree. Police said they believed Miller had chosen the remote Resurrection Pass Trail and had veered deep off-trail in hopes that his body would not have been discovered for years, if ever. At the time of his death, Miller's girlfriend was pregnant with the couple's first child. She gave birth to their son shortly before Miller's body was discovered in March 2003.

Although Miller's disappearance and death were reported in the local press shortly after his body was found, his suicide did not become widely known outside Alaska until the latter part of 2003 when ESPN went searching for him to film a SportsCenter feature to be shown during the tenth anniversary of his stunt.

== See also ==
- Michael Sergio
- "The Homer They Fall," a 1996 episode of The Simpsons that includes a parody of Miller
