= Gene Pukall =

German boxer

Personal information
- Nationality: Germany
- Born: Gene Pukall; 16 January 1975 (age 51) Berlin, Germany
- Weight: Heavyweight

Boxing career
- Stance: Orthodox

Boxing record
- Total fights: 34
- Wins: 18
- Win by KO: 16
- Losses: 14
- Draws: 2
- No contests: 0

Gene Pukall (born 16 January 1975) is a German former professional boxer who fought in the heavyweight division.

== Early life ==
Pukall was born in Berlin.

== Career ==
=== Debut ===
Pukall turned professional in April 2000 in the Neuruppin, Brandenburg, Germany. In his debut, Pukall lost on points to Danny Oleksy over four rounds.

=== German title ===
He suffered defeat in his contest for the German heavyweight championship when he was stopped by Andreas Sidon.

=== WBU World Heavyweight title ===
Pukall became the World Boxing Union V. Heavyweight World Champion on March 5, 2011, by defeating fellow German Ingo Jaede in the Hohenschoenhausen in Berlin.
