= Riddick Bowe =

American boxer (born 1967)

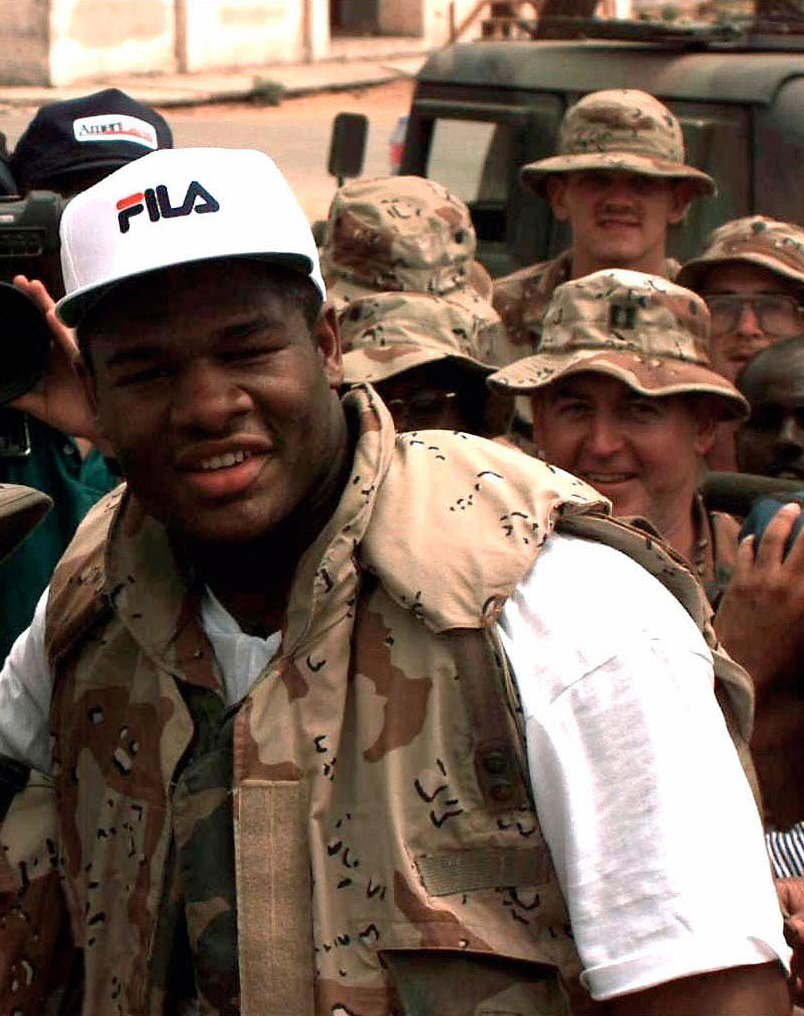
- Bowe in 1993

Personal information
- Nickname: Big Daddy
- Born: Riddick Lamont Bowe; August 10, 1967 (age 59) New York City, New York, U.S.
- Height: 6 ft 5 in (196 cm)
- Weight: Heavyweight

Boxing career
- Reach: 81 in (206 cm)
- Stance: Orthodox

Boxing record
- Total fights: 45
- Wins: 43
- Win by KO: 33
- Losses: 1
- No contests: 1
Medal record
Men's amateur boxing
Representing United States
Olympic Games
Silver medal – second place	1988 Seoul	Super heavyweight
Pan American Games
Bronze medal – third place	1987 Indianapolis	Super heavyweight
Junior World Championships
Gold medal – first place	1985 Bucharest	Light heavyweight

Riddick Lamont Bowe (born August 10, 1967) is an American former professional boxer and professional kickboxer who competed between 1989 and 2008 in boxing, and in 2013 for kickboxing (Muay Thai). He held the undisputed world heavyweight championship in 1992, and won the super heavyweight silver medal at the 1988 Summer Olympics.

After turning professional in 1989, Bowe went on to become a two-time world heavyweight champion. In 1992 he became the unified heavyweight champion by winning the World Boxing Association (WBA), World Boxing Council (WBC) and International Boxing Federation (IBF) titles by defeating then-unbeaten former undisputed cruiserweight champion Evander Holyfield. That same year, Bowe was named Fighter of the Year by The Ring magazine and the Boxing Writers' Association of America. Bowe vacated the WBC title later that year in protest, instead of defending the title against their number one contender, Lennox Lewis. This left the championship fragmented until 1999. In a rematch with Holyfield in 1993, Bowe narrowly lost the WBA and IBF titles in what would be his only professional defeat.

Bowe later regained a portion of the world heavyweight championship in 1995, defeating Herbie Hide for the World Boxing Organization (WBO) title. In doing so, Bowe became the first boxer in history to win the titles of all four major sanctioning bodies: the WBA, WBC, IBF, and WBO. Later that year, Bowe vacated the WBO title in order to fight Holyfield for a third time, and won decisively by being the first boxer to defeat Holyfield by knockout. 1996 saw Bowe engage in two brutal slugfests with Andrew Golota, both of which ended controversially when Golota repeatedly hit him with low blows.

Bowe retired from boxing after the Golota fights, making low-key comebacks in 2004 and 2008. In a 2010 article by Boxing Scene, Bowe was ranked the 21st greatest heavyweight of all time. In 2015, he was inducted into the International Boxing Hall of Fame. As of 2026, Bowe remains the last American undisputed world heavyweight champion.

== Early life ==
Bowe was born on August 10, 1967, the twelfth of his mother Dorothy Bowe's thirteen children. Bowe was born and raised in the East New York section of Brooklyn, New York City. His brother Henry died of AIDS, and his sister Brenda was stabbed to death by a drug addict during an attempted robbery.

Bowe was in the same elementary school sixth-grade class with Mike Tyson. "We went to school together in the sixth grade in P.S. 396 (in Brownsville.) I really didn't know him," Bowe recalled.

== Amateur boxing career ==
Bowe was training at the Bedford-Stuyvesant Boxing Association Gym or the "Bed-Stuy BA" for short. As an amateur, Bowe won the prestigious New York Golden Gloves Championship and other tournaments. In 1984, age 17, he knocked out opponent James Smith in just 4 seconds. In 1985, at the National Golden Gloves championships, he lost to Fort Worth heavyweight Donald Stephens. Apart from boxing he attended Kingsborough Community College, where he studied drama — in hopes of an acting career after boxing — and also studied business administration.

His friends called him "Don King" because of his hairstyle. Bowe said he was emulating Mark Breland. "I got a majority of my experience with Mark, I'm inspired by what he's accomplished. It makes it possible for me to do the same," said Bowe in an interview.

=== New York Golden Gloves Championships ===
Bowe won four New York Golden Gloves Championships. He won two bouts as a 178-pounder in 1984 before failing to show for a third bout. He won the 1985 178 lb Novice Championship, 1986 178 lb Open Championship and the 1987 and 1988 Super Heavyweight Open Championship. By 1985 Bowe was ranked the #1 light heavyweight in the United States.

=== 1986 Goodwill Games ===
Bowe was a light heavyweight runner-up for the 1986 World Championships and 1986 Goodwill Games but did not qualify. During a year-and-a-half hiatus he gained over thirty pounds and jumped from light heavyweight to super heavyweight, then returned to the ring for the 1987 United States Olympic Festival.

=== 1987 Pan Am ===
Prior to 1987 Pan American Games, Bowe said he had suffered a hairline fracture in his right hand during one of his two fights at the Olympic Festival in July 1987. The injury, he said, was revealed in X-rays he had taken at home. Roosevelt Sanders, the head coach, said he was aware that Bowe's hand was being treated, but had not known it was broken. Bowe said he kept those injuries secret from the U.S. team coaching staff for fear of being kept out of the tournament.

=== Olympic qualifiers ===
At first, Bowe was dismissed from the Olympic-year training camp, because U.S. Olympic boxing Coach Ken Adams didn't like him. U.S. Army superheavyweight Robert Salters, a Brooklyn-born 25-year-old artilleryman of Fort Bragg, NC, who took up boxing in 1986 and had fewer than twenty amateur fights in his 16-months-long record before first meeting Bowe at the 1988 AAU National finals, floored Bowe twice before the referee stopped the fight. Salters became a real nemesis for Bowe during his amateur career, as they fought each other to nearly a draw in the 1988 Olympic Box-offs at Caesars Palace, after Bowe lost to Salters in the Olympic Trials (Bowe came in at 231 lbs, Salters at 247.). "He was talking' trash about me, and that helped me mentally," Salters said. Bowe had been boxing reportedly with ligament damage on the middle knuckle of his right hand, which he got the day before the Box-offs, and with a damaged right ankle, eventually managed to win, for the judges had to pick up a winner despite the even 58–58 score. The fifth unidentified judge, who scored the bout 58–58, gave it to Bowe on unidentified subjective grounds. Despite giving Bowe a hard time on four occasions in a row, Salters never turned pro.

=== 1988 Olympics ===
Bowe won the silver medal in the 1988 Seoul Olympics, outpointing Soviet Alex Miroshnichenko in the semifinals, and losing a controversial match in the finals to future world heavyweight champion Lennox Lewis. Bowe had a dominant first round, landing 33 of 94 punches thrown (34%) while Lewis landed 14 of 67 (21%). In the first round the referee from East Germany gave Bowe two cautions for headbutts and deducted a point for a third headbutt, although replay clearly showed there was no headbutt. Commentator Ferdie Pacheco disagreed with the deduction, saying they did not hit heads. In the second round, Lewis landed several hard punches. The referee gave Bowe two standing eight counts and waved the fight off after the second one, even though Bowe seemed able to continue. Pacheco disagreed with the stoppage, calling it "very strange," but Marv Albert said Bowe took "a pounding."

=== Highlights ===
United States Junior Championships (middleweight), 1983:

- Lost to Adolpho Washington RSC 2

New York Golden Gloves (light heavyweight), New York City, February 1984:

- 1/16: Defeated Richard Newton RSC 1 (1:29)
- 1/8: Defeated Hezekiah Salone
- 1/4: Lost to ? by walkover

(gold) New York Golden Gloves (light heavyweight), Elks Club, Queens, New York, and Madison Square Garden, New York City, February 1985:

- 1/4: Defeated Alonzo Knowles KO 1 (1:33)
- 1/2: Defeated Jose Guzman KO 3 (1:06)
- Finals: Defeated Alfred Walcott KO 1 (0:24)

(gold) New York State Golden Gloves, novice division (light heavyweight), Madison Square Garden, New York City, March 1985:

- 1/2: Defeated Gil Walden KO 1 (1:14)
- Finals: Defeated n/a (Bowe won the Dr. Herbert Cassidy Memorial Cup as 1985's top novice boxer)

National Golden Gloves (light heavyweight), Little Rock, Arkansas, March 1985:

- 1/16: Defeated Keith Sudduth KO
- 1/8: Defeated Odell Jones by decision
- 1/4: Defeated Cornell Harris RSC 1
- 1/2: Defeated Gregory Everett RSC 3 (1:25)
- Finals: Lost to Donald Stephens by split decision, 2–3

Junior World box-offs (light heavyweight), El Paso Civic Center, El Paso, Texas, August 1985:

- Defeated Razz Chapin KO 1

(gold) Junior World Championships (light heavyweight), Bucharest, Romania, September 1985:

- 1/4: Defeated Mikhail Sadovsky (Soviet Union) RSC 1
- 1/2: Defeated Damian Vasile (Romania) RSC 1
- Finals: Defeated Péter Hart (Hungary) RSC 1

World Cup (light heavyweight), Seoul, South Korea, November 1985:

- 1/4: Lost to Nurmagomed Shanavazov (Soviet Union) by unanimous decision, 0–5

U.S. Olympic Festival Eastern Qualifier (super heavyweight), Lake Placid, New York, May 1987:

- 1/4: Defeated Bryant Farris RSCH 1 (2:54)
- 1/2: Defeated Mark Anthony by walkover
- Finals: Defeated George Kilbert Pierce by unanimous decision, 5–0

(gold) U.S. Olympic Festival (super heavyweight), Raleigh, North Carolina, July 1987:

- 1/2: Defeated Nathaniel Fitch RSC 2 (1:27)
- Finals: Defeated Kevin Ford RSC 3 (1:43)

Pan Am Box-offs (super heavyweight), International Center of the Broadmoor, Colorado Springs, Colorado, July 1987:

- Defeated Carlton Hollis

(bronze) Pan American Games (super heavyweight), Indianapolis, Indiana, August 1987:

- 1/2: Lost to Jorge Luis González (Cuba) by split decision, 2–3 (Bowe knocked down in the 1st rd; González was given a standing eight count in the 3rd rd)

USSR−USA Duals (super heavyweight), Moscow, Soviet Union, 1988:

- Lost to Alex Miroshnichenko (Soviet Union) by decision

United States National Championships (heavyweight), Colorado Springs, Colorado, March–April 1988:

- 1/16: Defeated James Ernst RSCH 1 (2:37)
- 1/8: Defeated Tevin George RSCH 2 (1:20)
- 1/4: Defeated Kevin Ford
- 1/2: Lost to Robert Salters RSCH 2 (Bowe knocked down at 2:50 of the 1st rd, and at 2:00 of the 2nd rd; after referee Jerry Dusenberry stopped the bout at 2:00, Bowe protested violently, and as the decision was announced attacked Salters verbally and physically, the two fighters had to be pulled apart)

Olympic Trials (super heavyweight), Concord Pavilion, Concord, California, July 1988:

- 1/4: Defeated Nathaniel Fitch by unanimous decision, 5–0
- 1/2: Defeated Louis Savarese DQ 2 (Savarese disqualified for holding at 2:15)
- Finals: Lost to Robert Salters by majority decision, 1–4 (Salters knocked down at 0:30 of the 1st rd)

Olympic Box-offs (super heavyweight), Caesars Palace, Las Vegas, Nevada, July 1988:

- Day 1: Defeated Robert Salters by split decision, 3–2
- Day 2: Defeated Robert Salters by split decision, 3–2

(silver) Summer Olympics (super heavyweight), Seoul, South Korea, September–October 1988:

- 1/8: Defeated Biko Botowamungu (Austria) KO 2 (2:53)
- 1/4: Defeated Peter Hrivnák (Czechoslovakia) RSCH 1 (2:34)
- 1/2: Defeated Alex Miroshnichenko (Soviet Union) by unanimous decision, 5–0 (Bowe knocked down at 2:16 of the 1st rd; Bowe was given a standing eight count at 2:35 of the 1st rd; Miroshnichenko had his mouthpiece knocked off at 0:30 of the 3rd rd; Miroshnichenko was given a standing eight count at 1:10, and 1:35 of the 3rd rd)
- Finals: Lost to Lennox Lewis (Canada) RSC 2 (0:43)

Bowe finished his amateur career with a record of 104 wins, 18 losses.

== Professional boxing career ==
Bowe turned professional after his Olympic loss. Highly regarded trainer Eddie Futch took on the job of developing Bowe, as he saw the talent. Eddie would say that Bowe had more potential than any boxer he had ever trained.

Bowe turned professional in March 1989 and knocked out Lionel Butler. His then manager, Rock Newman, kept Bowe active, fighting 13 times in 1989, beating journeymen — the most notable being Garing Lane, whom he beat twice. In September 1990, Bowe made his first step up in class, fighting faded ex-champion Pinklon Thomas, whom he dominated until Thomas gave up after eight rounds. The following month, Bowe knocked out Bert Cooper in two rounds, which added to his reputation and high ranking.

In March 1991, Bowe knocked out 1984 Olympic Super Heavyweight Gold medalist Tyrell Biggs. In Bowe's next fight, ex-champion Tony Tubbs appeared to outbox and outsmart Bowe in a close bout, only to have the judges award Bowe a unanimous decision. In August 1991, Bowe knocked out future world heavyweight champion Bruce Seldon in one round.

=== Fights against Elijah Tillery ===
Bowe fought two interesting bouts against Elijah Tillery in 1991. Their first fight, at the Washington Convention Center, drew attention for its bizarre conclusion. Bowe dominated the first round and dropped Tillery. After the round ended, Tillery walked toward Bowe and taunted him, and Bowe responded by punching Tillery. Tillery then threw several low kicks at Bowe, who then unleashed a flurry of punches on Tillery as he lay on the ropes. Bowe's trainer Rock Newman grabbed Tillery from behind on the ring apron and pulled him over the ropes as Bowe continued to throw punches. Tillery somersaulted over the ropes, and was quickly detained by security. After order was restored and the fighters returned to the ring, Tillery and Bowe continued a war of words, and minor incidents continued until the ring was cleared. Tillery was controversially disqualified for kicking Bowe, with Bowe getting the win, much to the surprise of the television announcers. The referee, Karl Milligan, had stepped between the two fighters to separate them and stepped forward as he did so, inadvertently missing the action behind him after the bell between the combatants. The fighters fought a rematch two months later at Convention Hall in Atlantic City, with Bowe dominating and stopping Tillery in four rounds.

=== Bowe vs. Coetzer ===
In July 1992, he knocked out South African Pierre Coetzer in the seventh round of a WBA heavyweight title eliminator. The victory made him the mandatory challenger to undisputed heavyweight champion Evander Holyfield.

=== World heavyweight champion ===
In November 1992 he fought reigning champ Evander Holyfield for the undisputed heavyweight title. Bowe won a unanimous decision in an entertaining fight, flooring Holyfield in the 11th round. However, it was the tenth round most boxing fans will remember. The epic brutal back and forth exchanges helped make it Ring Magazine's "Round of the Year." Commentator Al Bernstein exclaimed, "That was one of the greatest rounds in heavyweight history. Period!"

A couple of weeks earlier in London, Bowe's old Olympic rival, Lennox Lewis, knocked out Canadian Donovan "Razor" Ruddock in two rounds, establishing himself as the World Boxing Council's number one contender. The Bowe-Holyfield and Lewis-Ruddock fights were part of a mini-tournament, whereby all four fighters agreed the two winners would meet each other for the undisputed world heavyweight championship. Bowe's manager Rock Newman made a proposal: the $32 million purse HBO was offering should be split 90–10 in Bowe's favor, an 'absurd' offer which Lennox Lewis rejected. Lewis's manager, Kellie Maloney (known as Frank Maloney at the time), rejected another offer of two million for Lewis to fight on a Bowe undercard, citing his distrust of the Bowe camp after the aforementioned financial negotiations. Bowe responded by holding a press conference in which he dumped the WBC world heavyweight championship belt into a trash can and relinquished it in order to protest the actions of the WBC and WBC President José Sulaimán concerning the fight payoff.

Bowe's first defense of his remaining titles came on February 6, 1993, when he fought 34-year-old former champion Michael Dokes at Madison Square Garden and knocked him out in the first round. In February 1993, Bowe met Pope John Paul II during the pope's general audience at the Vatican, a day after Bowe completed a goodwill mission to Somalia. In Bowe's next fight, May 22, 1993, at RFK Stadium in Washington, D.C., Bowe knocked out Jesse Ferguson in the second round to retain the title. This set up a rematch with Evander Holyfield.

In the rematch with Holyfield, Bowe looked overweight. He had entered training camp at 266 lbs and weighed in at 246 lbs, eleven pounds heavier than in the first fight with Holyfield.

Bowe and Holyfield exchanged hard punches. Bowe ended up losing the belts to Holyfield by a majority decision. This fight was also known for a bizarre stunt in which parachutist James "Fan Man" Miller dropped into the open air arena, landing in the ropes by Bowe's corner. This surreal scene delayed the fight in the seventh round by nearly a half-hour. Bowe stated afterwards he thought the bout should have declared a 'technical draw' or a 'no contest' owing to the unfair delay.

=== After title loss ===
In August 1994, Bowe fought two comeback fights. He faced the much smaller Buster Mathis Jr and, after struggling to connect with his bobbing and weaving target, hit Mathis while he was down with what was ruled an accidental blow, and the bout was ruled a 'No Contest' by referee Arthur Mercante Sr. In December 1994, Bowe punched Larry Donald at a prefight press conference, later beating him by 12 round unanimous decision for the WBC Continental Americas Heavyweight title, giving the 16-0 heavyweight contender Donald his first loss.

=== WBO heavyweight champion and Holyfield rubber match ===
In March 1995, Bowe won the WBO version of the world heavyweight championship by knocking down England's Herbie Hide six times en route to scoring a sixth-round knockout.

In June 1995, after a heated build up, Bowe defended the WBO heavyweight title against his archrival in the amateurs, Jorge Luis González, At the MGM Grand in Las Vegas. The prefight hype contained bizarre trash talk, which included Gonzalez declaring a desire to eat Bowe's heart and likening himself to a lion while making Bowe out to be a hyena. Bowe won by sixth-round knockout over Gonzalez. He vacated the WBO championship soon after. After the Gonzales fight, Bowe fought a rubber match with Evander Holyfield, their third and final meeting. Holyfield knocked Bowe down during the fight, but Bowe maintained his composure, and persevered to score an eighth round stoppage victory.

On January 11, 1996, Bowe was officially no longer the WBO champion.

=== Bowe vs. Golota I and II ===
After defeating Holyfield in the third bout of their trilogy, Bowe was matched against undefeated heavyweight contender Andrew Golota at the Madison Square Garden in an HBO Boxing event. Bowe's weight problem again resurfaced, as the favorite entered the ring at a career high of 252 lbs. Though ahead on points, Golota was penalized several times for low blows to the testes, and was finally disqualified in the seventh round after a combination of punches to Bowe's testicles. Seconds after Golota was disqualified, Bowe's entourage rushed the ring, attacked Golota with a two way radio (Golota traded punches with one of them, requiring 11 stitches to close the wound caused by the radio) and assaulted Golota's 74-year-old trainer Lou Duva, who collapsed in the ring and was taken out of The Garden on a stretcher. The entourage began rioting, fighting with spectators, staff and policemen alike, resulting in a number of injuries before they were forced out of the arena in what evolved into a lengthy televised ring spectacle.

The fight made many sports shows, including SportsCenter, and there was a good amount of public interest in a rematch. The rematch was on Pay Per View. Golota, after dropping Bowe in the second round, and being dropped himself later, was leading on the scorecards, only to be disqualified in the ninth round, once again for deliberately punching Bowe repeatedly in the testes. Despite not having another riot, this fight also proved to be controversial, with an unsuccessful protest filed by Golota's camp to try to overturn the fight's result.

This fight was featured on HBO's documentary Legendary Nights: The Tale of Bowe-Golota.

=== Return to boxing ===
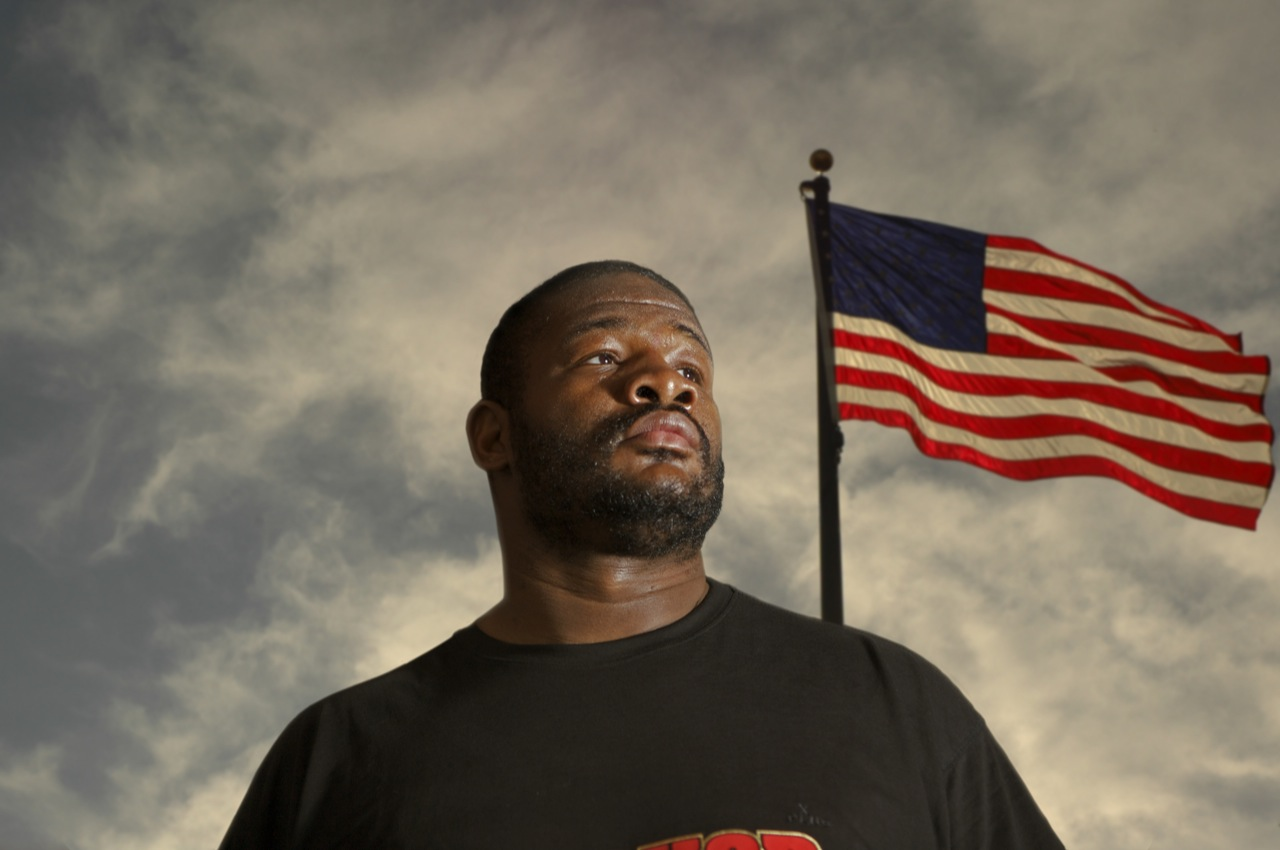
Bowe in 2008

On September 25, 2004, after seven and a half years away from boxing, Bowe returned with a second-round knockout over Marcus Rhode. In a second comeback fight, in April 2005, an overweight Bowe narrowly defeated journeyman Billy Zumbrun by ten round split decision.

Bowe declared bankruptcy in 2005. On December 13, 2008, with the help of new manager Bob Bain, Bowe, 41, returned to the ring for the first time in over three and a half years on the undercard of the Wladimir Klitschko versus Hasim Rahman world heavyweight title bout in Mannheim, Germany and won an eight-round unanimous decision over Gene Pukall.

=== Legacy and reputation ===
Riddick Bowe's boxing record stands at 43 wins and 1 loss, with 33 knockouts. In the autobiography of veteran former referee Mills Lane, Let's Get It On, who had officiated at some of Bowe's fights, he professed that Bowe could have been one of boxing's greatest boxers but foolishly squandered the opportunity through immaturity and lack of discipline.

BoxRec ranks Bowe as the 28th greatest fighter among boxers that had their last professional boxing match at heavyweight. Noted for his in-fighting skills, jab and combination punching, Bowe's first fight with Evander Holyfield is considered one of the greatest world heavyweight title fights of all time. Following this victory, he met Nelson Mandela during a visit to South Africa. Bowe's trainer at the time, Eddie Futch, lamented that upon his return, Bowe failed to ever achieve the same physical condition for his subsequent fights.

In 2017, The Ring magazine ranked Bowe as the 19th best heavyweight of all time in a poll of a panel of 30 trainers, matchmakers and members of the boxing media. The consensus was that Bowe, described as both a "super talent" and a "super waste", only had one great fight, when winning the title from Holyfield, and ultimately disappointed in squandering his obvious natural ability due to laziness.

Bowe's reputation suffered because of the weak challengers he faced as champion (an aging Michael Dokes and also Jesse Ferguson) before losing the title to Holyfield in their rematch. He is also widely criticized for relinquishing the WBC title rather than defending it against mandatory challenger Lennox Lewis, thus fracturing the undisputed championship until Lewis unified the titles in 1999.

Bowe is the first boxer in any division to hold all four major versions of the world championship (WBA, WBC, IBF, and WBO) at any point during his career, an accomplishment emulated in the heavyweight division only by Tyson Fury and Oleksandr Usyk, the latter being the first to hold them all at the same time.

Bowe's sole loss, to Evander Holyfield in 1993, was avenged in 1995, meaning that he finished their trilogy 2-1 ahead. With the exception of a 1994 no-contest with Buster Mathis Jr., Bowe defeated every opponent he faced as a professional.

Alongside Gene Tunney, Rocky Marciano, Sultan Ibragimov and Nikolai Valuev, Bowe is one of five former heavyweight champions to have never suffered a stoppage defeat during his career.

== Professional kickboxing career ==
In March 2013, Bowe announced his Muay Thai debut, having trained under Kru Airr Phanthip and Kru Chan in Las Vegas. He faced Levgen Golovin for the WPMF Super Heavyweight World Title in Pattaya, Thailand. On June 14, 2013, Bowe was knocked down five times from kicks to his leg. The championship match was called to a stop halfway through the second round.

== Life outside of boxing ==
=== Attempt at joining the U.S. Marine Corps ===
After the Golota fights, Bowe retired from boxing and decided to join the United States Marine Corps Reserve. He said he made the decision both to make his mother proud and to rededicate himself to training, with the intention of returning to boxing shortly after.

Bowe arrived at Marine Corps Recruit Depot Parris Island on February 10, 1997. On his first day of recruit training, Bowe discussed leaving the Corps with Marine commanders, and quit after three days of heavy physical training with his platoon in Parris Island, South Carolina, on February 21, 1997.

=== Humanitarian activities ===
Shortly after winning his first title against Evander Holyfield, Bowe saw a news story on television that revealed a million dollars' worth of medicines donated to the Somali refugees and orphans was not able to be transported to the war-torn region due to a lack of funds to pay for the charter aircraft needed. Bowe immediately had his representatives contact AmeriCares, the NGO leading the effort, and pledged the 100,000 dollars needed to fund the trip - on the condition he could go to the country with the goods, and make sure they got to their intended recipients. While in Somalia, he visited U.S. Marines and an orphanage on the Kenyan border. He was accompanied by several members of his management team, including manager Rock Newman and Head of International Sales Alexis Denny (CEO of an independent media distributor).

Bowe also took action when he heard news of other tragedies. In 1995, when Alexis Denny was in Indonesia on other business, she read Asian news coverage of Rodolfo Yap, a young man in the Philippines who was electrocuted while positioning his antenna so his family could watch a Riddick Bowe fight. She relayed this news to Bowe, and explained to the media at the time 'The heavyweight champion was very moved by the story and having lost a brother and a sister earlier in life, decided to make a financial contribution to the family of Mr. Yap." Bowe authorized her to fly to the Philippines and try to locate the man's family, make a contribution to their expenses, and also provide funds to support the Philippine boxing Team training for the Olympics (in the name of the deceased).

=== Prison ===
Bowe was convicted of the February 1998 kidnapping of his estranged wife Judy, and their five children. Thinking it would reconcile his marriage, Bowe went to his wife's Cornelius, North Carolina, home and threatened her with a knife, handcuffs, duct tape, and pepper spray. He forced her and their children into a vehicle and set out for his Fort Washington, Maryland, home. During the kidnapping, Bowe stabbed his wife in the chest. Police captured Bowe in South Hill, Virginia, freeing his family. Bowe agreed to a plea bargain of guilty to "interstate domestic violence", and was sentenced to 18 to 24 months in prison. Despite the agreed sentence, on February 29, 2000, the judge sentenced Bowe to only 30 days, due to a claim of brain damage by Bowe's defense. This sentence, counter to the plea agreement, was later overturned. Bowe served 17 months in Federal prison. On February 8, 2001, Bowe was arrested in Long Island after a domestic dispute with his new wife. Bowe allegedly dragged his wife and left her with cuts on her knees and elbows.

=== Attempted professional wrestling debut ===
In 2013, Riddick Bowe announced his intentions to start training to be a professional wrestler. He was to make his debut for the UK-based Preston City Wrestling organization on March 1, 2014. On December 14, 2013, Preston City Wrestling announced on their Facebook Page that Bowe would no longer be appearing due to a disagreement with Bowe's new agent.

== In popular culture ==
In 1993, a video game entitled Riddick Bowe Boxing was released for various platforms. Also that year, Bowe appeared in an episode of The Fresh Prince of Bel-Air, entitled "You Bet Your Life", as a bully named "Bo".

In 1997, Bowe appeared in the music video “Mo Money Mo Problems” by The Notorious B.I.G.

A photo of a young Riddick Bowe is the subject of a song on Mark Kozelek's self-titled 2018 album

== Professional boxing record ==
45 fights	43 wins	1 loss
By knockout	33	0
By decision	7	1
By disqualification	3	0
No contests	1	

No.	Result	Record	Opponent	Type	Round, time	Date	Location	Notes
45	Win	43–1 (1)	Gene Pukall	UD	8	Dec 13, 2008	SAP Arena, Mannheim, Germany	
44	Win	42–1 (1)	Billy Zumbrun	SD	10	Apr 7, 2005	Pechanga Resort & Casino, Temecula, California, U.S.	
43	Win	41–1 (1)	Marcus Rhode	TKO	2 (10), 2:45	Sep 25, 2004	Fire Lake Casino, Shawnee, Oklahoma, U.S.	
42	Win	40–1 (1)	Andrew Golota	DQ	9 (10), 2:58	Dec 14, 1996	Convention Hall, Atlantic City, New Jersey, U.S.	Golota disqualified for repeated low blows
41	Win	39–1 (1)	Andrew Golota	DQ	7 (12), 2:37	Jul 11, 1996	Madison Square Garden, New York City, New York, U.S.	Golota disqualified for repeated low blows
40	Win	38–1 (1)	Evander Holyfield	TKO	8 (12), 0:58	Nov 4, 1995	Caesars Palace, Paradise, Nevada, U.S.	
39	Win	37–1 (1)	Jorge Luis González	KO	6 (12), 1:50	Jun 17, 1995	MGM Grand Garden Arena, Paradise, Nevada, U.S.	Retained WBO heavyweight title
38	Win	36–1 (1)	Herbie Hide	KO	6 (12), 2:25	Mar 11, 1995	MGM Grand Garden Arena, Paradise, Nevada, U.S.	Won WBO heavyweight title
37	Win	35–1 (1)	Larry Donald	UD	12	Dec 3, 1994	Caesars Palace, Paradise, Nevada, U.S.	Won WBC Continental Americas heavyweight title
36	NC	34–1 (1)	Buster Mathis Jr.	NC	4 (10), 2:11	Aug 13, 1994	Convention Hall, Atlantic City, New Jersey, U.S.	Mathis Jr. unable to continue after a Bowe foul
35	Loss	34–1	Evander Holyfield	MD	12	Nov 6, 1993	Caesars Palace, Paradise, Nevada, U.S.	Lost WBA and IBF heavyweight titles
34	Win	34–0	Jesse Ferguson	KO	2 (12), 0:17	May 22, 1993	Robert F. Kennedy Memorial Stadium, Washington, D.C., U.S.	Retained WBA heavyweight title
33	Win	33–0	Michael Dokes	TKO	1 (12), 2:19	Feb 6, 1993	Madison Square Garden, New York City, New York, U.S.	Retained WBA and IBF heavyweight titles
32	Win	32–0	Evander Holyfield	UD	12	Nov 13, 1992	Thomas & Mack Center, Paradise, Nevada, U.S.	Won WBA, WBC, and IBF heavyweight titles
31	Win	31–0	Pierre Coetzer	TKO	7 (12), 2:59	Jul 18, 1992	The Mirage, Paradise, Nevada, U.S.	
30	Win	30–0	Everett Martin	TKO	5 (10), 2:28	May 8, 1992	Riviera, Winchester, Nevada, U.S.	
29	Win	29–0	Conroy Nelson	KO	1 (10), 1:16	Apr 7, 1992	Broadway by the Bay Theater, Atlantic City, New Jersey, U.S.	
28	Win	28–0	Elijah Tillery	TKO	4 (10), 1:14	Dec 13, 1991	Convention Hall, Atlantic City, New Jersey, U.S.	
27	Win	27–0	Elijah Tillery	DQ	1 (12)	Oct 29, 1991	Walter E. Washington Convention Center, Washington, D.C., U.S.	Won vacant WBC Continental Americas heavyweight title; Tillery disqualified for kicking
26	Win	26–0	Bruce Seldon	KO	1 (10), 1:48	Aug 9, 1991	Convention Hall, Atlantic City, New Jersey, U.S.	
25	Win	25–0	Philipp Brown	TKO	3 (10), 2:47	Jul 23, 1991	Broadway by the Bay Theater, Atlantic City, New Jersey, U.S.	
24	Win	24–0	Rodolfo Marin	KO	2 (10), 1:45	Jun 28, 1991	The Mirage, Paradise, Nevada, U.S.	
23	Win	23–0	Tony Tubbs	UD	10	Apr 20, 1991	Caesar's, Atlantic City, New Jersey, U.S.	
22	Win	22–0	Tyrell Biggs	TKO	8 (10), 2:17	Mar 2, 1991	Broadway by the Bay Theater, Atlantic City, New Jersey, U.S.	
21	Win	21–0	Tony Morrison	KO	1, 2:20	Dec 14, 1990	Kansas City, Missouri, U.S.	
20	Win	20–0	Bert Cooper	KO	2 (10), 3:09	Oct 25, 1990	The Mirage, Paradise, Nevada, U.S.	
19	Win	19–0	Pinklon Thomas	RTD	8 (10), 3:00	Sep 7, 1990	UDC Physical Activities Center, Washington, D.C., U.S.	
18	Win	18–0	Art Tucker	TKO	3 (10), 1:41	Jul 8, 1990	Broadway by the Bay Theater, Atlantic City, New Jersey, U.S.	
17	Win	17–0	Jesus Contreras	KO	1 (10), 1:18	May 8, 1990	Broadway by the Bay Theater, Atlantic City, New Jersey, U.S.	
16	Win	16–0	Eddie Gonzales	UD	8	Apr 14, 1990	The Mirage, Paradise, Nevada, U.S.	
15	Win	15–0	Robert Colay	TKO	2 (6), 0:49	Apr 1, 1990	D.C. Armory, Washington, D.C., U.S.	
14	Win	14–0	Mike Robinson	TKO	3, 1:58	Feb 20, 1990	Trump Plaza Hotel and Casino, Atlantic City, New Jersey, U.S.	
13	Win	13–0	Charles Woolard	TKO	2, 2:46	Dec 14, 1989	St. Joseph, Missouri, U.S.	
12	Win	12–0	Art Card	RTD	3 (8), 3:00	Nov 28, 1989	Alumni Arena, Buffalo, New York, U.S.	
11	Win	11–0	Don Askew	TKO	1, 2:21	Nov 18, 1989	Coolidge High School, Washington, D.C., U.S.	
10	Win	10–0	Garing Lane	TKO	4 (6), 1:50	Nov 4, 1989	Trump Plaza Hotel and Casino, Atlantic City, New Jersey, U.S.	
9	Win	9–0	Mike Acey	TKO	1 (4), 2:26	Oct 19, 1989	Trump Plaza Hotel and Casino, Atlantic City, New Jersey, U.S.	
8	Win	8–0	Earl Lewis	TKO	1 (6), 1:26	Sep 19, 1989	Veteran's Coliseum, Jacksonville, Florida, U.S.	
7	Win	7–0	Anthony Hayes	KO	1 (6), 1:21	Sep 15, 1989	Gleason's Arena, New York City, New York, U.S.	
6	Win	6–0	Lee Moore	KO	1	Sep 3, 1989	Pensacola, Florida, U.S.	
5	Win	5–0	Lorenzo Canady	RTD	2 (6), 3:00	Jul 15, 1989	Broadway by the Bay Theater, Atlantic City, New Jersey, U.S.	
4	Win	4–0	Antonio Whiteside	TKO	1 (6), 1:19	Jul 2, 1989	Cumberland County Crown Coliseum, Fayetteville, North Carolina, U.S.	
3	Win	3–0	Garing Lane	UD	4	May 9, 1989	Steel Pier, Atlantic City, New Jersey, U.S.	
2	Win	2–0	Tracy Thomas	TKO	3, 1:57	Apr 14, 1989	Trump Plaza Hotel and Casino, Atlantic City, New Jersey, U.S.	
1	Win	1–0	Lionel Butler	TKO	2 (4), 1:55	Mar 6, 1989	Lawlor Events Center, Reno, Nevada, U.S.	

== Titles in boxing ==
=== Major world titles ===
- WBA heavyweight champion (200+ lbs)
- WBC heavyweight champion (200+ lbs)
- IBF heavyweight champion (200+ lbs)
- WBO heavyweight champion (200+ lbs)

=== Regional/international titles ===
- WBC Continental Americas heavyweight champion (200+ lbs) (2×)

=== Undisputed titles ===
- Undisputed heavyweight champion

== Muay Thai record ==
Muay Thai record
0 wins (0 KOs), 1 loss, 0 draws
Date	Result	Opponent	Event	Location	Method	Round	Time	Record
2013-06-14	Loss	(Ukraine) Ievgen Golovin	WPMF Super Heavyweight Title	Pattaya, Thailand	TKO (right low kick)	2	N/A	0–1
Legend: Win Loss Draw/No contest Notes

== See also ==
- List of undisputed boxing champions
- List of heavyweight boxing champions
- List of WBA world champions
- List of WBC world champions
- List of IBF world champions
- List of WBO world champions

== Notes ==
Sporting positions
Regional boxing titles
Vacant Title last held by Marcelo Victor Figueroa	WBC Continental Americas heavyweight champion October 29, 1991 – December 1991; Vacated	Vacant Title next held by Alex García
Vacant Title last held by Larry Donald	WBC Continental Americas heavyweight champion December 3, 1994 – March 11, 1995; Vacated	Vacant Title next held by Jimmy Thunder
World boxing titles
Preceded by Evander Holyfield	WBA heavyweight champion November 13, 1992 – November 6, 1993	Succeeded by Evander Holyfield
Preceded by Evander Holyfield	WBC heavyweight champion November 13, 1992 – December 14, 1992; Vacated	Succeeded by Lennox Lewis
Preceded by Evander Holyfield	IBF heavyweight champion November 13, 1992 – November 6, 1993	Succeeded by Evander Holyfield
Preceded by Evander Holyfield	Undisputed heavyweight champion November 13, 1992 – December 14, 1992; Titles fragmented	Vacant Title next held by Lennox Lewis
Preceded by Herbie Hide	WBO heavyweight champion March 11, 1995 – 11 January 1996; Vacated	Vacant Title next held by Henry Akinwande
Awards
Previous: Robert Quiroga vs. Akeem Anifowoshe	The Ring Fight of the Year vs. Evander Holyfield; 1992	Next: Michael Carbajal vs. Humberto González
Inaugural winner	Best Boxer ESPY Award; 1993	Next: Evander Holyfield
