= Riddick Bowe vs. Evander Holyfield II =

1993 boxing match

Repeat or Revenge
- Date: November 6, 1993
- Venue: Caesars Palace, Paradise, Nevada
- Title(s) on the line: WBA and IBF heavyweight titles

Tale of the tape
Boxer	Riddick Bowe	Evander Holyfield
Nickname	Big Daddy	The Real Deal
Hometown	Brooklyn, New York	Atlanta, Georgia
Purse	$11,000,000	$9,000,000
Pre-fight record	34–0 (29 KO)	29–1 (22 KO)
Age	26 years, 2 months	31 years
Height	6 ft 5 in (196 cm)	6 ft 2 1/2 in (189 cm)
Weight	246 lb (112 kg)	217 lb (98 kg)
Style	Orthodox	Orthodox
Recognition	WBA and IBF; Heavyweight Champion; The Ring; No. 1 Ranked Heavyweight; The Ring No. 7 ranked pound-for-pound fighter Former undisputed champion	WBA; No. 2 Ranked Heavyweight; IBF/The Ring; No. 3 Ranked Heavyweight; 2-division undisputed world champion

Result
- Holyfield wins via 12-round majority decision (114-114, 115-114, 115-113)

Riddick Bowe vs. Evander Holyfield II, billed as Repeat or Revenge, was a professional boxing match that took place on November 6, 1993, for the WBA and IBF heavyweight championships.

== Background ==
The two fighters had previously met a little less than a year before on November 13, 1992. In what was considered one of the greatest heavyweight fights of all time, Bowe defeated Holyfield by unanimous decision to become the Undisputed Heavyweight Champion. Bowe's reign as Undisputed Champion would not last long, as his victory over Holyfield meant he would have to make the first defense of his newly won titles against Lennox Lewis, the man who had defeated him at the 1988 Olympics to capture the gold medal. After the two sides could not get a deal done, Bowe chose to forfeit his WBC title rather than face Lewis, throwing the belt in the trash at a press conference. Bowe would then go on to successfully, and easily, defend his remaining WBA and IBF titles twice, first knocking out 34-year-old former WBA Heavyweight champion Michael Dokes in the first round, and then defeating journeyman Jesse Ferguson by way of second-round knockout.

Holyfield, meanwhile, would have only one fight between his two Bowe fights, a rematch with Alex Stewart. Though Holyfield looked sluggish throughout the fight, he nevertheless was able to earn the victory via unanimous decision. It was also his first bout with new trainer Emanuel Steward.

On August 12, 1993, the much anticipated rematch between Bowe and Holyfield was announced.

== The Fight ==
Bowe started off strong, winning the first three rounds. Holyfield stormed back to take rounds 4, 5 and 6. In round 7, Holyfield hit Bowe with a right hook and Bowe responded by throwing a powerful combination, landing several punches in the process. Shortly after this exchange, the fight was stopped after James Miller crashed into the ring with his powered paraglider causing a 21-minute delay. After the delay, the two fighters finished the remainder of the round with one judge awarding Holyfield the round, one judge awarding Bowe the round and one judge awarding a draw. Holyfield dominated round 8, reopening Bowe's wounds with a five-punch combination. Knowing he was behind in the cards, Bowe became more aggressive in rounds 9, 10 and 11; however, in the final 30 seconds of rounds 10 and 11, Holyfield hit Bowe with several combinations, winning five of the judges' six scores for those two rounds. The two men hammered each other in round 12, both attacking until the final bell.

Like in the previous fight, the bout would go to the judges, this time with Holyfield earning the victory in a close fight via majority decision, becoming only the third man to regain the Heavyweight championship from the man who defeated him for it, after Floyd Patterson (who beat Ingemar Johansson in their 1960 rematch) and Muhammad Ali (who defeated Leon Spinks in their 1978 rematch). It would be the only loss in Bowe's professional career.

HBO's unofficial scorer Harold Lederman scored the fight 114-114, the Associated Press scored the bout 115-113 for Bowe, and the New York Times had it 117-112 for Holyfield.

=== Main event scorecards ===
Nevada Athletic Commission Official score card
Title: Repeat or Revenge					Referee: Mills Lane					Supervisor:				
Date: 6 November 1993					Venue: Caesars Palace					Promoter: Kathy Duva				
Bowe		vs.	Holyfield		Bowe		vs.	Holyfield		Bowe		vs.	Holyfield	
RS	TS	Rd	TS	RS	RS	TS	Rd	TS	RS	RS	TS	Rd	TS	RS
10		1		9	10		1		9	10		1		9
9	19	2	19	10	10	20	2	18	9	10	20	2	18	9
10	29	3	28	9	10	30	3	27	9	10	30	3	27	9
9	38	4	38	10	9	39	4	37	10	9	39	4	37	10
9	47	5	48	10	9	48	5	47	10	9	48	5	47	10
9	56	6	58	10	9	57	6	57	10	9	57	6	57	10
9	65	7	68	10	10	67	7	66	9	10	67	7	67	10
9	74	8	78	10	9	76	8	76	10	9	76	8	77	10
10	84	9	87	9	10	86	9	85	9	10	86	9	86	9
9	93	10	97	10	9	95	10	95	10	9	95	10	96	10
10	103	11	106	9	9	104	11	105	10	9	104	11	106	10
10	113	12	115	9	10	114	12	114	9	10	114	12	115	9
FINAL SCORE	113	–	115	FINAL SCORE	FINAL SCORE	114	–	114	FINAL SCORE	FINAL SCORE	114	–	115	FINAL SCORE
Lost			Won		Draw			Draw		Lost			Won	
Judge: Jerry Roth					Judge: Chuck Giampa					Judge: Patricia Morse Jarman				
Suspensions: None					Point deductions: None					Decision: Majority Decision for Holyfield				

== The "Fan Man" incident ==
In a highly bizarre moment, parachutist James "Fan Man" Miller would crash into the ring during the second minute of round 7 causing a 21-minute delay of the fight. Miller was immediately pulled from the ropes into the crowd by security. He was attacked by both fans and security eventually being knocked unconscious by a member of Bowe's security team. After a short hospital stay, Miller was then taken to the Clark County detention center and charged with dangerous flying, being released after paying $200 bail. The "Fan Man" incident was named Event of the Year by The Ring magazine.

== Aftermath ==
After his victory, Holyfield contemplated retirement, but eventually decided to continue fighting and began looking into a potential unification match with WBC champion Lennox Lewis. However, both the WBA and IBF refused the notion, informing Holyfield they would only sanction a bout with undefeated number one contender Michael Moorer. Holyfield was then offered $20 million by Bowe's manager Rock Newman to accept a third fight with Bowe, but Holyfield turned down the offer and went ahead with his scheduled match against Moorer, due in part to both the WBA and IBF threatening to strip Holyfield of their titles should he have accepted Newman's challenge. Holyfield and Moorer would meet on April 22, 1994, with Moorer scoring an upset victory by majority decision.

Bowe's unsuccessful defense of his championship was the last time he ever fought for a major world championship. He would not return to the ring until the following August, fighting Buster Mathis, Jr. to a no contest after he hit Mathis while he was down on the canvas. In March 1995, Bowe won the World Boxing Organization heavyweight championship, which was not as widely recognized at the time. After successfully defending it once, Bowe vacated the title to pursue a third fight against Holyfield, which he won by scoring an 8th-round technical knockout.

== Undercard ==
Confirmed bouts:

== Broadcasting ==
Country	Broadcaster
Mexico	Televisa
United Kingdom	ITV
United States	HBO
Thailand	Channel 7

Preceded by vs. Jesse Ferguson	Riddick Bowe's bouts 6 November 1993	Succeeded by vs. Buster Mathis Jr.
Preceded by vs. Alex Stewart II	Evander Holyfield's bouts 6 November 1993	Succeeded by vs. Michael Moorer
