= Buster Mathis Jr. =

American boxer

Personal information
- Born: Buster DAmato Mathis; March 25, 1970 (age 56) Grand Rapids, Michigan, U.S.
- Height: 6 ft 0 in (183 cm)
- Weight: Heavyweight

Boxing career
- Reach: 75 in (191 cm)
- Stance: Orthodox

Boxing record
- Total fights: 26
- Wins: 21
- Win by KO: 7
- Losses: 2
- Draws: 0
- No contests: 3

Buster Mathis Jr. (born March 25, 1970) is an American former professional boxer who competed in the heavyweight division. He held the regional IBF-USBA Heavyweight title, winning the belt in 1994, making two successful defenses until losing to Lou Savarese in 1996.

== Early life ==
Mathis Jr. was the son of Buster Mathis, a heavyweight boxer from the 1960s. The senior Mathis had been invited to the 1964 Tokyo Olympics, and was a contender with fights against champions Muhammad Ali and Joe Frazier. Mathis Jr. was a heavy man and took up boxing because he was bullied as a child until the age of 14, and also for the benefit of losing extra weight. Mathis Jr. attended Grandville Public Schools in Grandville, Michigan, from 1979 until he graduated in 1988.

== Professional career ==
Mathis Jr. turned pro in 1991 and quickly put together 12 wins. A busy, crowding fighter, Mathis was small for a heavyweight at around 220 lbs but skilled enough to beat fairly respected fighters like Levi Billups, Justin Fortune and Mike Dixon very early in his career. Buster Mathis encouraged his son to fewer higher paying fights, using the Mathis name to his advantage. He was considered a weak puncher (3 KO's in those 12 fights) but his opposition was above average.

In 1993 he challenged Mike 'The Bounty' Hunter (23-3) for his USBA heavyweight belt. Hunter won a close decision over Mathis. The loss however was soon voided after Hunter later tested positive for cocaine.

In 1994 Mathis again contested the USBA belt (stripped from Hunter), this time winning an impressive 12-round decision over ex-Olympic champion Tyrell Biggs (27-7).

In August of that year Mathis was brought in as the comeback opponent for former undisputed champion Riddick Bowe. After a good effort bobbing and weaving out of the way of Bowe's best shots, Mathis began to fall behind and took a knee in the fourth. Bowe knocked Mathis out while he was on the mat, yet instead of being disqualified, referee Arthur Mercante Sr. and New Jersey commission boss Larry Hazzard agreed to void the contest.

In 1995 Mathis retained his USBA belt with a point win over contender Alex Garcia, thus setting up a fight with Mike Tyson. This was Tyson's second fight since being released from prison earlier in the year.

Mathis Sr. did not see his son's fight with Tyson due to Sr's final battle with health problems such as diabetes and kidney issues. Mathis Sr. died a few weeks before the Tyson fight. In the third round Tyson knocked Mathis Jr. out with a right uppercut. Ten days after the Tyson fight Mathis Jr.'s trainer and long time friend Joey Fariello died, and Mathis Jr. quickly lost his spark for the sport.

A 1996 fight with prospect Obed Sullivan ended with a no contest in the 5th round, after Sullivan was badly cut in a clash of heads. This was the third no contest in Mathis Jr.'s relatively brief career.

In November 1996 Mathis lost his USBA belt to undefeated Lou Savarese.

Mathis retired at the age of 26 with a 21-2 (7 KO's) record, and 3 no contests.

== After boxing ==
After his boxing career he studied education receiving a bachelor's degree from the University of Miami. He currently resides in his hometown of Grand Rapids, Michigan and spends his free time speaking to youth to encourage and motivate them, signing autographs and speaking to foster children. Buster Mathis is now the vice president of a non-profit, Buster Mathis Inc. (www.thebullybuster.org) and offers elementary children the Bully Buster Prevention Program through a boxing technique called the 'peek-a-boo'. Buster Mathis is single and has no children at this time. Buster also is a substitute teacher on his off time, most recently at East Kentwood High School. On October 20, 2016, Buster Mathis Jr. was inducted into the Grand Rapids (MI) Sports Hall of Fame, joining his father who was previously inducted.

== Fighting style ==
Buster Mathis Jr is a busy and crowding fighter, he aims to challenge his opponent and smother them from the start to the end. He is considered to be a good volume puncher and is quick on the inside, additionally he frequently threw punches in combinations. Mathis Jr obtained good head movement; he avoided punishment by constantly bobbing, weaving, and ducking Buster Mathis was considered to be a weak puncher, according to his record, only 33% of his wins came by knockout.

== Professional boxing record ==
21 Wins (7 knockouts, 14 decisions), 2 Losses (2 knockouts), 3 No Contests Archived 2015-03-27 at the Wayback Machine
Result	Record	Opponent	Type	Round	Date	Location	Notes
Loss	21-2 (3 NC)	(United States) Lou Savarese	TKO	7	1 Nov 1996	(United States) Fantasy Springs Resort Casino, Indio, California	IBF USBA Heavyweight Title.
No Contest	21-1 (3 NC)	(United States) Obed Sullivan	NC	5	20 Apr 1996	(United States) Ralph Engelstad Arena, Grand Forks, North Dakota	IBF Intercontinental Heavyweight Title.
Win	21-1 (2 NC)	(United States) Ken Smith	KO	4	27 Feb 1996	(South Africa) Morula Sun Casino, Mabopane, North West	
Loss	20-1 (2 NC)	(United States) Mike Tyson	KO	3	16 Dec 1995	(United States) Core State Spectrum, Philadelphia, Pennsylvania	Mathis knocked out at 2:32 of the third round.
Win	20-0 (2 NC	(United States) Mike Acklie	TKO	1	5 Aug 1995	(United States) New Mexico State Fair, Albuquerque, New Mexico	
Win	19-0 (2 NC)	(United States) Alex Garcia	UD	12	18 Apr 1995	(United States) The Aladdin, Las Vegas, Nevada	IBF USBA Heavyweight Title.
Win	18-0 (2 NC	(United States) Ken Smith	UD	10	4 Feb 1995	(United States) Silver Nugget, Las Vegas, Nevada	
Win	17-0 (2 NC)	(United States) Garing Lane	TKO	9	3 Dec 1994	(United States) Harlingen, Texas	
Win	16-0 (2 NC)	(United States) Lyle McDowell	TKO	5	5 Nov 1994	(United States) Caesars Tahoe, Stateline, Nevada	IBF USBA Heavyweight Title. Referee stopped the bout at 0:46 of the fifth round.
Win	15-0 (2 NC)	(United States) Mike Lee Faulkner	UD	10	1 Oct 1994	(United States) The Roxy, Boston, Massachusetts	
No Contest	14-0 (2 NC)	(United States) Riddick Bowe	NC	4	13 Aug 1994	(United States) Boardwalk Hall, Atlantic City, New Jersey	Referee stopped the bout at 2:11 of the fourth round when Bowe knocked out Mathis while he was down.
Win	14-0 (1 NC)	(United States) Sherman Griffin	MD	10	2 Apr 1994	(Japan) Tokyo	
Win	13-0 (1 NC0	(United States) Tyrell Biggs	UD	12	5 Feb 1994	(United States) The Aladdin, Las Vegas, Nevada	IBF USBA Heavyweight Title.
No Contest	12-0 (1 NC)	(United States) Mike Hunter	NC	12	4 Dec 1993	(United States) USS Lexington Museum, Corpus Christi, Texas	IBF USBA Heavyweight Title. Decision awarded to Hunter was vacated when he tested positive for drugs.
Win	12-0	(United States) Mike Dixon	UD	10	2 Oct 1993	(United States) Resorts Casino Hotel, Atlantic City, New Jersey	
Win	11-0	(United States) Mark Young	UD	10	7 Aug 1993	(United States) Resorts Casino Hotel, Atlantic City, New Jersey	
Win	10-0	(United States) Levi Billups	PTS	10	10 Jul 1993	(United States) Fernwood Resort, Bushkill, Pennsylvania	
Win	9-0	(United States) Carl Williams	TKO	5	15 Jun 1993	(United States) The Palace of Auburn Hills, Auburn Hills, Michigan	
Win	8-0	(Australia) Justin Fortune	TKO	8	14 Feb 1993	(United States) Las Vegas, Nevada	
Win	7-0	(United States) Ty Evans	PTS	6	22 Sep 1992	(United States) The Palace of Auburn Hills, Auburn Hills, Michigan	
Win	6-0	(United States) Jordan Keepers	PTS	6	24 Apr 1992	(United States) Beloit, Wisconsin	
Win	5-0	(United States) Tim Martin	TKO	5	21 Apr 1992	(United States) The Palace of Auburn Hills, Auburn Hills, Michigan	
Win	4-0	(United States) Luis Torres	PTS	4	21 Mar 1992	(United States) Cleveland, Ohio	
Win	3-0	(United States) Tracy Thomas	PTS	4	3 Mar 1992	(United States) Livonia, Michigan	
Win	2-0	(United States) Rusty Williams	PTS	4	8 Feb 1992	(United States) Lansing, Michigan	
Win	1-0	(United States) Ahmad Gihad	PTS	4	9 Dec 1991	(United States) Waukesha, Wisconsin	
