= Ray Mercer vs. Larry Holmes =

Boxing competition

The Last Stand
- Date: February 7, 1992
- Venue: Convention Center, Atlantic City, New Jersey

Tale of the tape
Boxer	Ray Mercer	Larry Holmes
Nickname	Merciless	The Easton Assassin
Hometown	Union City, New Jersey	Easton, Pennsylvania
Purse	$1,200,000	$1,000,000
Pre-fight record	18–0 (13 KO)	53–3 (37 KO)
Age	30 years, 10 months	42 years, 3 months
Height	6 ft 1 in (185 cm)	6 ft 3 in (191 cm)
Weight	228 3/4 lb (104 kg)	233 lb (106 kg)
Style	Orthodox	Orthodox
Recognition	IBF/The Ring; No. 5 Ranked Heavyweight	WBC; No. 12 Ranked Heavyweight; Former WBC and IBF heavyweight champion

Result
- Holmes wins via unanimous decision (117–112, 117–111, 115–113)

Ray Mercer vs. Larry Holmes, billed as The Last Stand, was a professional boxing match contested on February 7, 1992.

== Background ==
The previous year was a good one for the undefeated Olympic Gold Medalist Ray Mercer. He started the year off by defeating the previously undefeated Francesco Damiani to capture the WBO Heavyweight title. Following that victory, Mercer was matched up against another undefeated fighter in Tommy Morrison for what would be the first and only defense of his WBO title. Morrison outboxed Mercer for the first three rounds, but Mercer came back strong in the fourth round and proceeded to knock out Morrison in brutal fashion by pinning him against a corner and landing several unanswered, heavy blows until the referee stopped the bout 28 seconds into the fifth round. The victory made Mercer one of the top fighters in the heavyweight division and he quickly vacated the then less regarded WBO title in order to face 42-year-old ex-heavyweight champion Larry Holmes in a match to determine who would next meet Evander Holyfield for the IBF, WBA and WBC versions of the Heavyweight Championship. Holmes had twice retired, first after failing to recapture his IBF title in a 1986 rematch with Michael Spinks, and then again after being dominated for four rounds in a 1988 fight with Mike Tyson for Tyson's undisputed title. In April 1991, Holmes launched a comeback and he proceeded to defeat five unknowns through the course of the year before agreeing to face Mercer in February 1992. Holmes was given little chance to defeat Mercer and came into the fight as a 4–1 underdog. Mercer and his team looked at the fight as a "springboard" to gain Mercer more marketability. Holmes, however, remained confident that he could defeat Mercer and vowed that he would retire for the final time should he lose.

== The Fight ==
Through the early portion of the fight, Mercer and Holmes were both aggressive and traded punches, though Mercer was able to land his punches more effectively and at a higher frequency. Mercer continued to be the aggressor in the second round and spent most of the round on the attack. Towards the end of the round, Holmes stood with his back against one of the corners and was able to land a few right hands to Mercer's head while using that strategy. By the third round, Holmes had fully embraced the defensive strategy and continued to fight with his back against the ropes for the remainder of the fight. Mercer would continue to attack Holmes in the corner with several combinations, but Holmes would counter with some combinations of his own. In the fourth, Holmes would circle around Mercer in an effort to pace himself and not burn himself out by trading punches with the younger and stronger Mercer. Holmes then spent almost the entire fifth round with his back against the corner where he landed some good shots on Mercer, who by then seemed to have tired of Holmes unorthodox strategy and was not landing as much as he had in the earlier rounds. Mercer would continue to struggle with Holmes' defense for the rest of the fight and by the later rounds was seemingly more fatigued than Holmes. The fight went the full 12 rounds with neither man picking up a knockdown. As such, the fight went to the scorecards, and with scores of 117–112, 117–111 and 115–113, Larry Holmes was declared the winner by unanimous decision.

Holmes later claimed that he had fought Mercer in spite of having a detached retina.

== Aftermath ==
Holmes parlayed his upset victory over Mercer into a title shot at Evander Holyfield, which was made official only a month after his victory with a date set for June 19, 1992. Holmes used a similar approach in his match with Holyfield as he did with Mercer, taking a more defensive stance by positioning himself against the ropes and inviting Holyfield to throw punches, with Holmes hoping that Holyfield would tire himself as the fight went on. However, unlike Mercer, Holyfield would not get fatigued and continued to attack Holmes for the duration of the fight. Holmes simply was unable to sustain much offense and lost by a relatively lopsided unanimous decision.

Ray Mercer returned from his defeat to win his next two fights and eventually earned another chance at receiving a World title shot when he agreed to meet WBA/IBF champion Riddick Bowe. In what was supposed to be a tuneup before his title match with Bowe, Mercer fought journeyman Jesse Ferguson on February 6, 1993 on the undercard of the Riddick Bowe–Michael Dokes championship fight. However, Ferguson dominated Mercer, winning easily by unanimous decision, taking Mercer's title shot with Bowe in the process. Adding to Mercer's problems was that after his loss, Ferguson revealed that Mercer had attempted to bribe him with $100,000 to take a dive knowing that he was well behind Ferguson on the scorecards and a loss would cost him his title shot.

== Undercard ==
Confirmed bouts:

== Broadcasting ==
Country	Broadcaster
United States	HBO

Preceded by vs. Tommy Morrison	Ray Mercer's bouts 7 February 1992	Succeeded by vs. Mike Dixon
Preceded by vs. Jamie Howe	Larry Holmes's bouts 7 February 1992	Succeeded by vs. Evander Holyfield
