= Riddick Bowe vs. Jesse Ferguson =

1993 boxing match

The Heavyweight Debate
- Date: May 22, 1993
- Venue: RFK Stadium, Washington, D.C., U.S.
- Title(s) on the line: WBA and Lineal Heavyweight Championships

Tale of the tape
Boxer	Riddick Bowe	Jesse Ferguson
Nickname	Big Daddy	The Boogieman
Hometown	Brooklyn, New York, U.S.	Philadelphia, Pennsylvania, U.S.
Purse	$7,000,000	$500,000
Pre-fight record	33–0 (28 KO)	19–9 (13 KO)
Age	25 years, 9 months	36 years, 2 months
Height	6 ft 5 in (196 cm)	6 ft 2 in (188 cm)
Weight	244 lb (111 kg)	224 lb (102 kg)
Style	Orthodox	Orthodox
Recognition	WBA, IBF and Lineal; Heavyweight Champion; The Ring; No. 1 Ranked Heavyweight; The Ring No. 5 ranked pound-for-pound fighter	WBA; No. 12 Ranked Heavyweight

Result
- Bowe via 2nd-round knockout

Riddick Bowe vs. Jesse Ferguson, billed as The Heavyweight Debate, was a professional boxing match contested on May 22, 1993, for the WBA and Lineal Heavyweight championships. The fight took place in RFK Stadium in Washington, DC, was Bowe's second defense of the title he had won from Evander Holyfield in November 1992, and was the main event of a card that included a fight between Roy Jones Jr. and Bernard Hopkins for the vacant IBF middleweight championship, which Jones won.

== Background ==
Since winning what was then the undisputed world heavyweight championship from Evander Holyfield in November 1992, Bowe had made one title defense. That came in February 1993 in a fight against former champion Michael Dokes, whom he knocked out in the first round to retain the WBA, IBF, and lineal championships he still held (he was forced to relinquish the WBC championship after refusing to defend against their number one contender, Lennox Lewis).

Ferguson, meanwhile, had largely been a journeyman fighter over the course of his career. His resume featured bouts against a series of former and future champions, but he had never once fought for a world title and had been defeated nine times when he entered a bout with 1988 Olympic gold medalist and rising contender Ray Mercer on the same night Bowe fought Dokes. Despite being a significant underdog, Ferguson outboxed Mercer and won a decision victory.

Bowe, who had been seeking a fight with Mercer, instead chose to make his next defense against Ferguson. However, the IBF did not have Ferguson in its contender rankings and refused to allow Bowe to defend their title against him; therefore, when the bout was signed, only the WBA and lineal championships were placed at stake. Despite his limited success and his status as a 40-1 underdog, Ferguson remained confident that he could defeat Bowe, vowing to get the victory by knockout. Bowe responded to Ferguson's claims by calling him a "knucklehead" while also threatening to "punish" his competitor.

Bowe was a 40-1 favourite on fight night.

== The Fights ==
=== Jones Jr. vs. Hopkins ===
The Heavyweight Debate: Roy Jones Jr. vs. Bernard Hopkins
- Title(s) on the line: IBF Middleweight title

Tale of the tape
Boxer	(United States) Roy Jones Jr.	(United States) Bernard Hopkins
Nickname	"Junior"	"The Executioner"
Hometown	Pensacola, Florida	Philadelphia, Pennsylvania
Pre-fight record	21–0 (20 KO)	22–1 (15 KO)
Age	24 years, 4 months	28 years, 4 months
Height	5 ft 11 in (180 cm)	6 ft 1 in (185 cm)
Weight	159 1/2 lb (72 kg)	159 lb (72 kg)
Style	Orthodox	Orthodox
Recognition	IBF; No. 2 Ranked Middleweight; The Ring; No. 3 Ranked Middleweight; The Ring No. 9 ranked pound-for-pound fighter	IBF; No. 1 Ranked Middleweight; The Ring; No. 6 Ranked Middleweight

Result
- Jones Jr. wins via 12-round unanimous decision (116-112, 116-112, 116-112)

In the chief support, 1988 Olympics Silver medalist Roy Jones Jr. faced Bernard Hopkins for the IBF middleweight belt vacated by James Toney following his victory over Iran Barkley to win the IBF super middleweight title in February.

Both fighters were appearing in their first world title bout.

Gil Clancy on the HBO broadcast would some up the match up by saying "Bernard Hopkins is by far the best boxer and puncher Roy Jones has fought, but conversely, Roy is the most talented boxer Bernard Hopkins has ever fought."

==== The fight ====
Jones would prove too fast and too strong for Hopkins, largely controlling the action with his speed and unorthodox style. The more orthodox Hopkins would have some success whenever he backed Jones to the ropes, but these were sporadic and brief.

At the end of 12 rounds all three judges would score the bout 116–112 in favour of Jones, giving him a unanimous decision victory. Unofficial HBO scorer Harold Lederman scored it 118–110 and Boxing Illustrated had 117–111 both for Jones.

Jones landed 206 of 594 punches (35%) while Hopkins connected on 153 of 670 (23%).

==== Aftermath ====
Speaking to Larry Merchant after the bout Jones said "I was very tight coming into the fight, I had so much build-up on me. Being like I am, I kind of expected that, but I thank God I made it through that one and it won’t happen no more. That was my first title and that was that."

Jones would claim he had entered the bout with a broken right hand.

The two would have a rematch 17 years later at Light Heavyweight, where Hopkins would avenge his defeat with a dominant unanimous decision victory of his own.

Preceded by vs. Glenn Wolfe	Roy Jones Jr.'s bouts 22 May 1993	Succeeded by vs. Thulani Malinga
Preceded by vs. Gilbert Baptist	Bernard Hopkins's bouts 22 May 1993	Succeeded by vs. Roy Ritchie

=== Main Event ===
Much like in his previous fight, Bowe was able to dominate the entire duration of the fight. Bowe was the aggressor from the opening bell, constantly having Ferguson on the defensive throughout the first round by effectively using his left jab. With less than 30 seconds left in the round, a left hook from Bowe sent Ferguson back into the ropes which led to Bowe landing another left hook 10 seconds later that dropped Ferguson to the canvas. Ferguson barely was able to answer the referee's 10 count, just managing to get up at the count of nine as the round ended. Only seconds into round 2, Bowe was able to land an 8-punch combination that again sent Ferguson to the mat. This time Ferguson was unable to get up and Bowe was announced the winner by knockout.

== Aftermath ==
After Bowe's two successful title defenses over marginal competition, the much anticipated Bowe–Holyfield rematch was announced to take place on November 6, 1993. Like the previous fight, the two fighters again went the full 12 rounds, this time though, it was Holyfield who would earn the victory, becoming the only man to defeat Bowe in his professional career.

== Undercard ==
Confirmed bouts:

Winner	Loser	Weight division/title belt(s) disputed	Result
(United States) Roy Jones Jr.	(United States) Bernard Hopkins	vacant IBF middleweight title	12th round Unanimous decision
Non-TV bouts
(Canada) Egerton Marcus	(United States) Andrew Maynard	NABF Light Heavyweight Title	8th round RTD.
(United States) Sharmba Mitchell	(United States) Kenny Baysmore	Catchweight (10 rounds)	1st round KO.
(Sweden) George Scott	(United States) John Stewart	Welterweight (8 rounds)	Unanimous decision.
(Cuba) Jorge Luis Gonzalez	(United States) Dwayne Hall	Heavyweight (8 rounds)	1st round TKO.
(United States) Shannon Briggs	(United States) Bruce Johnson	Heavyweight (6 rounds)	1st round TKO.
(United States) Ben Simmons	(United States) Anthony Hardy	Super Featherweight (4 rounds)	Majority decision.

== Broadcasting ==
Country	Broadcaster
Mexico	Televisa
United Kingdom	ITV
United States	HBO

Preceded by vs. Michael Dokes	Riddick Bowe's bouts 22 May 1993	Succeeded by vs. Evander Holyfield II
Preceded by vs. Ray Mercer	Jesse Ferguson's bouts 22 May 1993	Succeeded by vs. Rocky Pepeli
