= Carol Polis =

American woman, believed to be first female boxing judge in history

Carol B. Polis (born May 23, 1936, in Philadelphia, Pennsylvania) is an American writer, stockbroker and former professional boxing judge. From 1973 to 2009, she judged 143 professional boxing contests, including many world championships. Polis is the first woman in the sport's history to become licensed to judge professional boxing fights.

== Biography ==
Polis is the daughter of a man from New York City who moved to Philadelphia and opened a store there, named "Consolidated Home Furnishings". She grew up in Jenkintown and enjoyed tennis, swimming and cheer-leading. Polis attended the University of Wisconsin in Madison obtaining an associate degree in Philosophy in 1956. In 1971, in her middle thirties, Polis married Bob Polis, a boxing referee.

Polis would attend boxing fights to accompany her husband to his job. One night, he decided to teach her how to score a fight he was officiating, figuring that keeping a score sheet would keep her entertained. Her husband later checked her score card and was impressed enough by her scoring that he took it to Zack Clayton, who was the Pennsylvania State Boxing Commissioner. Clayton told Carol Polis that he agreed with her score more than with the fight's three official judges' cards and encouraged her to keep scoring fights.

Eventually, Polis applied for a boxing judge license and was appointed one by Pennsylvania governor Milton Shapp in February 1972. On February 19, 1973, Polis was given her first assignment as a boxing judge, the important main event between perennial Heavyweight world title contenders Jimmy Young and Earnie Shavers at the Philadelphia Spectrum. Shavers won this fight by a third-round knockout; both he and Young would later lose decisions to Muhammad Ali for the world Heavyweight title (and Shavers would also lose to Larry Holmes for Holmes' WBC world Heavyweight title as well)

In 1974, after she had judged 35 fights, she appeared as a contestant on the TV show To Tell the Truth and managed to stump the entire panel.

Polis' first international assignment and first world title contest as a boxing judge came when she traveled to Denmark to judge a fight between WBA world Junior Middleweight champion Ayub Kalule and challenger Emiliano Villa. This fight took place on April 17, 1980, at the Brondby Hallen in Brondby and was won by Kalule by a tenth-round knockout.

On November 14, 1980, Polis got her second world championship boxing contest assignment, a fight between WBA and lineal world Bantamweight champion, Puerto Rico's Julian Solis and Polis' fellow Philadelphian, challenger Jeff Chandler. Polis had Chandler ahead by 128–118 when he beat Solis by 14th-round knockout.

The first fight with a world Heavyweight championship on the line in which Polis was invited to judge took place on December 10, 1982, at the Caesars Palace hotel in Las Vegas, Nevada and it was the controversial first fight between WBA world champion Mike Weaver and Michael Dokes. The bout was stopped one minute and three seconds into the first round; referee Joey Curtis, a WBA investigation later found, had been affected by the then recent tragedy in the fight between Ray Mancini and Duk Koo Kim-after which Kim died-and he prematurely waved the fight over giving Dokes the win by first-round knockout. Dokes and Weaver would then rematch five months later with Dokes retaining the title by a 15-round draw (tie). Polis was not involved in their rematch.

On October 19, 1984, as part of a program headlined by the undisputed world Middleweight title rematch bout between champion Marvelous Marvin Hagler and challenger Mustafa Hamsho in a doubleheader that was televised by HBO Boxing from the Madison Square Garden in New York, Polis officiated the fight for the WBA's vacant world Junior Middleweight title between Jamaica's Mike McCallum and Ireland's Sean Mannion. Polis had been assigned the main event between Hagler and Hamsho along with Eva Shain; Hagler-Hamsho 2 was going to become the first ever world title bout to be judged by two women judges. But one of Hagler's trainers (not Hagler himself) protested having two women judge the fight, and when Polis was reassigned to judge McCallum-Mannion instead along with Carol Castellano the historic honor fell on the program's secondary event instead. Polis scored the fight 149–136 for McCallum, who, with a fifteen rounds unanimous decision victory made history as well, as the first Jamaican world boxing champion in history.

Polis was one of the three judges assigned the rematch between World Boxing Association world Super-Bantamweight champion, the Puerto Rican Victor Callejas and his challenger, former world champion, Italy's Loris Stecca, fought on November 8, 1985, at Rimini, Italy, in which Callejas won with a highlight-reel sixth-round knockout. Polis had Stecca ahead after five rounds but the two knockdowns suffered by the Italian in round six gave the Puerto Rican a one-point lead on her card when the bout was stopped in the champion's favor right after the bell finishing that round sounded (since round seven had not started yet, the fight was recorded as a sixth-round knockout victory for the Puerto Rican boxer)

Carol Polis judged the December 16, 1995 contest between former and future world Heavyweight champion Mike Tyson and Buster Mathis, Jr., won by Tyson by a third-round knockout at the Spectrum (by then named the "Cores States Spectrum") in Philadelphia.

Polis retired as a boxing judge after scoring a bout between Gabriel Rosado and Ariel Espinal at South Philadelphia High School in Philadelphia on April 4, 2009. Rosado won the bout by a fifth-round technical knockout.

Polis was inducted into the Philadelphia Jewish Sports Hall of Fame and into the Pennsylvania Boxing Hall of Fame as a Judge in 2020.

== Book ==
Polis, along with author Rich Hershlag, co-wrote a biographical book about her life and experiences as a boxing judge. The book, titled "The Lady is a Champ", was released on May 10, 2012.

== Personal ==
Polis has four children from a previous marriage and her ex-husband Bob Polis has four children. She moved to Cape Coral, Florida, in 2018, once her days as a boxing judge were over. Polis has since moved back to Southampton, Pennsylvania in 2022, and is currently available for speaking engagements promoting her book, The Lady Is A Champ, which can be found on the Amazon.com internet sales website.

Polis survived breast cancer in 2007.

== Rocky V ==
Polis appears in a cameo as a boxing judge in Rocky V.
