= Michael Dokes vs. Gerrie Coetzee =

Boxing competition

The Buckeye Homecoming
- Date: September 23, 1983
- Venue: Richfield Coliseum, Richfield Township, Ohio
- Title(s) on the line: WBA Heavyweight Championship

Tale of the tape
Boxer	Michael Dokes	Gerrie Coetzee
Nickname	Dynamite	The Bionic Hand
Hometown	Akron, Ohio, US	Boksburg, Transvaal, South Africa
Pre-fight record	26–0–2 (15 KO)	28–3–1 (17 KO)
Age	25 years, 1 month	28 years, 5 months
Height	6 ft 3 in (191 cm)	6 ft 2 in (188 cm)
Weight	217 lb (98 kg)	215 lb (98 kg)
Style	Orthodox	Orthodox
Recognition	WBA; Heavyweight Champion; The Ring; No. 1 Ranked Heavyweight	WBA; No. 1 Ranked Heavyweight; The Ring; No. 4 Ranked Heavyweight

Result
- Coetzee defeated Dokes via 10th round KO

Michael Dokes vs. Gerrie Coetzee, billed as The Buckeye Homecoming, was a professional boxing match that took place on September 23, 1983, at the Richfield Coliseum in Richfield Township, Ohio, United States for Dokes' WBA world heavyweight title.

== Background ==
Michael Dokes had been the WBA's world heavyweight world champion since December 10, 1982, when referee Joey Curtis stopped his first fight with Mike Weaver in the first round. It was a controversial stoppage: Weaver and his management team, led by Hector "the Toe" Carlson, formally filed a complaint to the WBA's investigation committee, based on their opinion that Weaver was in condition to keep fighting when the fight was halted. Curtis declared that he had been impacted by Duk Koo Kim's death three weeks before, and a rematch was ordered. On May 20, 1983, Dokes and Weaver fought to a fifteen-round draw (tie), with Dokes keeping the world title.

Gerrie Coetzee, meanwhile, had been a contender for many years, losing in previous title tries to Weaver and to John Tate. He had also lost a ten-round split decision to Renaldo Snipes in a fight where he had sent Snipes down twice, in rounds one and four.

While the match-up itself could have been as racially provoking as 1982's Larry Holmes vs. Gerry Cooney fight, it was not. Most boxing fans and critics considered Holmes the legitimate world heavyweight champion, and there were different views concerning the Black versus White factor on this fight.

But, there was one fact that did not allow for the fight's promotional stage to take on a racial tune as did Holmes-Cooney one year before: Coetzee was openly opposed to Apartheid, publicly suggesting that he was not racist. As a matter of a fact, it is believed that most South African Blacks backed Coetzee, even as his two previous world championship attempts, held in South Africa, were against Tate and Weaver, who were Blacks as well.

One fact that was somewhat important for the fight to gain public interest was that, while not considered a "White hope", like Cooney had been before his fight with Holmes, Coetzee would be attempting to become the first White (and first non American) world heavyweight champion since 1960, when Ingemar Johansson reigned after defeating Floyd Patterson.

== The fight ==
The fight took place on September 23, 1983, at Richfield Coliseum in Richfield Township, Ohio, about halfway between Dokes' hometown of Akron and the much larger city of Cleveland. It was the last bout in a multi-bout fight card that included an Azumah Nelson knockout victory in two rounds over Puerto Rico's Alberto Collazo; Jeff Malcolm's ten-round decision win over future Aaron Pryor conqueror Bobby Joe Young; a fight between two of former Holmes challengers in which Alfredo Evangelista outpointed Snipes over ten rounds, and future world champion Tim Witherspoon's spectacular first-round knockout win over former title challenger (WBA title, Mike Weaver) James Tillis. Promoted by Don King promotions, the main event was televised in the United States on HBO Boxing.

Coetzee was a two-time loser in title shots, while Dokes was looked on as a young gun destined to challenge long-time pro Larry Holmes' supremacy in the heavyweight ranks. Dokes entered the ring by throwing flowers and blowing kisses to the ladies present at the event (a customary thing for him to do before his fights) . Dokes' self-image of the lady killer was reminiscent of Gorgeous George, the wrestler. Coetzee didn't preen or pose but walked to the ring in the more traditional style.

Coetzee, unlike in the Tate and Weaver bouts where he was considered a real threat, was a decided underdog in the odds, as well as in the opinion of the fight crowd. For the first few rounds the script played as it was written, as Dokes flashed his impressive hand speed, and combined head and body shots to keep Coetzee off balance. In the fifth round, however, things changed when Coetzee connected with a right hand to Dokes' jaw, sending the champion to the canvas on one knee. Coetzee's power wasn't a surprise but he had not put Weaver or the soft-chinned Tate down in his prior title-shots.

Unlike in his previous high-profile bouts, Coetzee gained confidence instead of fading. Previously, Coetzee would dominate the early rounds against top opposition, only to 'hit a wall.' He also had been a virtually one-armed fighter, relying almost solely on big right hands (the so-called "Bionic Right," so named because it was so often broken, it was surgically fused as a solid fist, giving Coetzee a supposedly unnaturally powerful punch. While it was indeed broken and operated upon often, it was actually just a repaired hand with no club-like qualities) following left jabs flicked out, but which were used more for mere effect. In this bout, Coetzee threw a great number of left hooks while applying his trademark pressure. Dokes' smooth boxing and speed of hand and foot were not resulting in controlling the bout, and Coetzee was not wearing down.

Dokes began to back up, and while he landed several hooks, Coetzee weathered them. Coetzee struck again in the 10th, hurting Dokes and pinning him against the ropes, raking him with right hands. He connected with another hard right that sent Dokes to the canvas again, this time with his body rolling until he could grab one of the ring's ropes with his right hand glove. Dokes was not able to get up, and Coetzee became the first White boxer in 23 years to win a world Heavyweight title, and the first African ever to win the world Heavyweight title.

At the time of the stoppage Dokes was behind on all three scorecards.

== Aftermath ==
Coetzee broke his right hand with the same punch that he knocked Dokes out with. Five days later, he underwent surgery in New York City, after which he received a hero's welcome in Johannesburg.

He was not able to fight for a year and two months after winning the world title. He was scheduled to have a unification bout with deposed WBC champion Holmes, who had been accepted as champion by the IBF after the WBC stripped him. The bout's particulars never came off due to JPD Sports, the backer of the bout, failing to deliver the money for the bout. Caesars Palace stepped in to save the promotion, only to back out. Coetzee and Holmes both wanted the bout, with Coetzee even willing to relinquish the WBA world title to have the bout come off. Don King's grip on Coetzee's management and promotion also was an impediment. Coetzee re-injured his right hand during training for the highly anticipated unification bout, forcing it to be cancelled. Holmes had been deposed by the WBC for failing to defend his title against Greg Page, who ultimately went on to beat Coetzee in Coetzee's first defense on December 1, 1984, by an eighth-round knockout to win the WBA world title. In what can perhaps be considered an irony, Coetzee did not win any of his three world title fights held at his home country, winning the only one that was held abroad.

Dokes also faced trouble after the fight, in his case, with drugs. He returned to boxing in March 1985, fighting Randall "Tex" Cobb in Las Vegas. Dokes had several comebacks, notably during the late 1980s and the early 1990s. His fight with contender Evander Holyfield where he was stopped after 10 exciting rounds, was named by Ring Magazine as the "Best heavyweight fight of the 1980s." In 1993, after having beaten a string of mostly fringe contenders, he received a shot at recovering the WBA heavyweight world title, (and gain the IBF world title on the process), but he was stopped in the first round by Riddick Bowe, at Madison Square Garden, in New York City. In the interview immediately following the bout, Dokes protested the stoppage as being premature, and demanded a return match with Bowe. Dokes subsequently had run-ins with the law, and would ultimately succumb to liver cancer in August 2012, dying the day after his 54th birthday.

== Undercard ==
Confirmed bouts:

== Broadcasting ==
Country	Broadcaster	Announcers
Australia	Seven Network	
Canada	Superchannel	
Mexico	Televisa	
Philippines	MBS 4	Ronnie Nathanielsz
United Kingdom	ITV	Reg Gutteridge
United States	HBO	Barry Tompkins, Sugar Ray Leonard and Larry Merchant

Preceded by vs. Mike Weaver II	Michael Dokes' bouts September 23, 1983	Succeeded by vs. Mike Jameson
Preceded by vs. Pinklon Thomas	Gerrie Coetzee's bouts September 23, 1983	Succeeded by vs. Greg Page
Awards
Preceded by Roberto Durán vs. Kirkland Laing	The Ring Upset of the Year; 1983	Succeeded by Johnny Bumphus vs. Gene Hatcher
