= Michael Dokes vs. Mike Weaver =

World Boxing Association Heavyweight championship contests of 1982 and 1983

The Michael Dokes vs. Mike Weaver or, alternately, Mike Weaver vs. Michael Dokes, boxing fights were a pair of fights that occurred in 1982 and 1983 and were for the World Boxing Association's world Heavyweight title. Both fights were considered controversial due to a separate set of situations. They are both among the most widely spoken about heavyweight boxing contests of the 1980s.

In their first encounter, won by Dokes by a first-round technical knockout, controversy ensued because many thought the fight was stopped too soon. The World Boxing Association, which sanctioned the bout, ordered a rematch. The controversy after the rematch, which was scored as a 15-rounds draw (tie) stemmed from the rematch's scoring, as many felt that either of the two boxers could have been given the win instead.

The two contests were promoted by American boxing promoter Don King.

== Contestants ==
=== Mike Weaver ===
Mike Weaver was born June 13, 1951, in Gainesville, Texas. He moved early in his life with his family to Compton, California, before setting in Pomona. In 1968, Weaver joined the United States Marine Corps and he went on to serve in the Vietnam War.

Weaver became an amateur boxer while with the Marines; out of 26 amateur fights, he won 23 and became all-Marines and all-Services champion, while also competing at AAU and Golden Gloves tournaments.

As a professional boxer, Weaver was considered a journeyman at first; he only won six of his first twelve fights, losing the other six. But, during a sparring session with another fellow U.S. Marine, Ken Norton, he got encouragement from Norton to keep on boxing and to train better for his fights. This turned out to be a turning point in Weaver's career. He later gained experience by sparring other boxing greats, such as George Foreman, Ron Lyle and Muhammad Ali.

Despite a less-than-stellar professional boxing record, Weaver was a hard puncher. He started racking up wins, including a fifth-round knockout over Bernardo Mercado and a ninth-round knockout over Stan Ward, the latter avenging an earlier defeat to the same boxer.

On June 22, 1979, Weaver fought World Boxing Council world Heavyweight champion Larry Holmes for Holmes' title at the Madison Square Garden in New York, New York, in an HBO Boxing-televised event. This contest was witnessed by 14,136 fans, most of which were estimated to have been attending to see the Roberto Duran versus Carlos Palomino ten-rounds contest on the program instead. Weaver was 19-8 coming in, compared to undefeated Holmes' record of 30–0. Despite the disparity in records, it was a highly competitive bout, until Holmes dropped Weaver in round eleven and stopped him in round twelve to retain the belt. Despite defeat, Weaver gained credit for his showing among boxing fans and critics. Weaver had Holmes hurt and Holmes needed attention immediately after the contest was over.

Weaver rebounded with two more wins, over Harry Terrell and Scott LeDoux. The win over LeDoux allowed him to capture the United States Boxing Association's regional, Heavyweight championship and be ranked by the WBA. Weaver challenged the WBA's world Heavyweight champion, John Tate, on March 31, 1980, at the champion's hometown of Knoxville, Tennessee. Weaver, a hard puncher, was decidedly behind on the three judges' scorecards and on his way to a points loss when he connected with a right to the body followed by a short left hook that lay Tate on the floor. Referee Ernesto Magaňa counted the champion out at 2 minutes and fifteen seconds of the fifteenth and last round, making Weaver the WBA world heavyweight champion with only forty-five seconds left in that contest, the punch that landed Weaver the championship still being remembered decades later.

Weaver was about to defend his title against former sparring partner Muhammad Ali; Ali even took to nicknaming Weaver "Weaver the beaver" in the same style he used to nickname Joe Frazier "the gorilla" and Earnie Shavers "the acorn" for example. But Weaver-Ali was not meant to happen as Ali instead challenged Weaver's former conqueror Larry Holmes for Holmes' WBC version of the championship.

Weaver defended his title twice; first by a thirteenth-round knockout win against future WBA world champion Gerrie Coetzee on Saturday, October 25, 1980, in Sun City, South Africa, and then, by a fifteen-rounds unanimous decision against James Tillis on Saturday, October 3, 1981, at Rosemont, Illinois.

A tentative agreement was announced for Weaver to fight Gerry Cooney in defense of his title instead of James Tillis, the WBA, however, ruled that Weaver had to fight James Tillis instead before Weaver vs. Cooney could take place. Eventually, Cooney faced WBC champion Holmes instead, June 11 of 1982. Due in part to the WBA's refusal to sanction a contest between Weaver and Cooney, Weaver came into the first contest between him and Dokes following a layoff of 14 months and one week. He sported a record of 24 wins and 9 losses into his third defense, the first bout with Dokes, with 16 wins and 4 losses by knockout.

=== Michael Dokes ===
Michael Dokes (August 10, 1958 – August 11, 2012) was a boxer from the state of Ohio. He was born in the city of Akron and spent most of his life there. With 32 amateur bouts fought, of which he won 27 and lost 5, Dokes' record as an unpaid competitor was similar to Weaver's.

Dokes fought many of the best future professional fighters of the Heavyweight division as an amateur and beat a number of them, including some future professional world champions such as Leon Spinks (a three-rounds points loss on Saturday, June 15, 1974), Trevor Berbick, John Tate, Greg Page and Tony Tubbs, who won their fight when Dokes was not able to box him on Thursday, May 13, 1976 (which was listed as a "walk-over" loss on Dokes' amateur record)

Dokes represented the United States at the 1975 Pan American Games in men's boxing's Heavyweight division after beating Tate in the Pan American games trails' Heavyweight finals on Saturday, September 6, 1975, at Madison, Wisconsin, by a walk-over. At the games, held in Mexico City, Mexico, Dokes fought well, making it to the championship final. Along the way, he beat Carlos Rivera and future WBC world Heavyweight champion Trevor Berbick. In the finals, however, he met the legendary Cuban boxer, three-time Olympic Games gold medalist at the heavyweight division, Teofilo Stevenson. On Saturday, October 25, Stevenson, who was making his 50th amateur contest compared to Dokes' 22, dominated Dokes on his way to claim the Pan American Games' gold medal, Young Dokes however, impressed fans and critics by lasting the three-round distance against the powerful and vastly over-experienced (compared to Dokes) Cuban.

Dokes then tried out for the United States Olympic (men's) boxing team before the 1976 Summer Olympics. He participated at the 1976 Olympics boxing trails, which were held near his hometown as they took place in Cincinnati, Ohio. He made it all the way to the semi-finals, where he lost, on June 4, 1976, to John Tate. This was Dokes' final fight as an amateur.

On October 13, 1976, Dokes debuted as a professional, beating Al Byrd by a second-round knockout as part of a program that also included a George Foreman contest and that was headlined by a Roberto Duran WBA world Lightweight championship title defense.

In 1977, Dokes fought an exhibition fight against Muhammad Ali.

Dokes set a torrid pace early on in his career; despite being sidelined for the last eight months of 1977, he returned to have six fights in 1978. He won each of those six contests, including his debut (as a professional, as he had held fights in Mexico as an amateur) abroad, against veteran George Holden, who had contested 48 bouts, on March 3, 1978, in Willemstad, Curacao, a fight that Dokes won by a second-round knockout as part of a program that also included an Ivan Samuco fight.

On September 28, 1979, the 14–0, 7 knockouts Dokes fought former world title challenger Jimmy Young as part of an undercard that also included Roberto Duran, Sugar Ray Leonard, Wilfredo Gomez and Larry Holmes defending his WBC world Heavyweight title against Earnie Shavers. Dokes won the fight by ten-rounds unanimous decision to become ranked by the WBA. Two bouts later, Dokes faced the 24 wins 6 defeats Lucien Rodriguez, a Moroccan-French who was, at the time, the future French national and European regional Heavyweight champion and Larry Holmes WBC world title challenger. Dokes outpointed Rodriguez over ten rounds to win a unanimous decision on Saturday, February 10, 1980, at the Convention Center in Miami Beach, Florida, thus continuing his upward movement in the Heavyweight division's rankings.

Next for Dokes was a contest with future WBA world Cruiserweight champion, 14 wins and 1 loss Puerto Rican Ossie Ocasio on Saturday, April 19, 1980, at the Municipal Gym in San Juan, Puerto Rico. The pair boxed to a ten-rounds draw (tie) before having an immediate rematch, which was again contested in San Juan but this time at the Roberto Clemente Coliseum on Saturday, June 28 of the same year. Dokes prevailed by a first-round knockout on that rematch.

On March 22, 1981, as part of a Salvador Sanchez vs. Roberto Castañon WBC world Featherweight championship contest's undercard program at the Caesar's Palace Hotel in Las Vegas, Nevada, Dokes faced future Larry Holmes world title challenger Randall "Tex" Cobb, outpointing the Texan by a ten-rounds majority decision in a difficult fight for Dokes. Dokes kept going up in the Heavyweight rankings with victories over British John L. Gardner, Harry Terrell and George Chaplin.

Dokes met Lynn Ball, 17 wins and 5 losses with 12 wins by knockout, for Ball's North American Boxing Federation's Heavyweight title on January 30, 1982, as part of the program headlined by a WBC world Junior Middleweight championship bout between Puerto Rico's Wilfred Benitez and Panama's Roberto Duran at the Caesar's Palace Hotel in Las Vegas. Dokes became a regional champion by knocking Ball out in round one.

Dokes made one more fight before his first world championship encounter with Weaver, beating the strong (24 wins, 3 losses, 14 knockouts wins) Thomas Franklyn "Franco" Thomas, stopping Thomas in five rounds in the main event of a program that took place on March 2, 1982, at the Playboy Hotel and Casino in Atlantic City, New Jersey.

Regarded as a boxer with superb hand-speed by experts such as Eddie Futch and with decent punching power, Dokes, who was at the time secretly also battling with a drug addiction, had 25 wins, 0 losses and 1 draw (tie) in 26 previous contests, with 14 wins by knockout.

== First fight ==
Mike Weaver vs. Michael Dokes
- Date: December 10, 1982
- Venue: Caesar's Palace Hotel, Las Vegas, Nevada
- Title(s) on the line: WBA Heavyweight title

Tale of the tape
Boxer	(United States) Mike Weaver	(United States) Michael Dokes
Nickname	"Hercules"	"Dynamite"
Hometown	Los Angeles, California	Akron, Ohio
Purse	$1,200,000	$400,000
Pre-fight record	24–9 (16 KO)	25–0–1 (14 KO)
Age	31 years, 5 months	24 years, 4 months
Height	6 ft 1 in (185 cm)	6 ft 3 in (191 cm)
Weight	209 3/4 lb (95 kg)	216 lb (98 kg)
Style	Orthodox	Orthodox
Recognition	WBA; Heavyweight Champion; The Ring; No. 2 Ranked Heavyweight	WBA/WBC/The Ring; No. 1 Ranked Heavyweight

Result
- Dokes defeated Weaver via 1st round TKO

Weaver-Dokes I was held on Friday, December 10, 1982, at the Caesar's Palace Hotel's Sports Pavilion in Las Vegas, Nevada. The Caesar's Palace Hotel at the time was going through a "golden era in boxing" of their own, with such major fights as Larry Holmes vs. Muhammad Ali, (a program in which Dokes also participated, knocking out Tom Fischer in seven rounds), Salvador Sanchez vs. Wilfredo Gomez, Sugar Ray Leonard vs. Thomas Hearns, Wilfred Benítez vs. Roberto Durán, Holmes vs. Gerry Cooney, the rematch between Aaron Pryor and Alexis Argüello, Marvin Hagler vs. Roberto Duran, Hearns vs. Duran, Hagler vs. Hearns Leonard vs. Hagler and others taking place at the property.

The first Weaver-Dokes contest was televised by HBO's boxing show, HBO World Championship Boxing. HBO's narrators for it were Barry Tompkins, Larry Merchant and Sugar Ray Leonard, along with the man widely considered at the time to be the real Heavyweight champion, WBC and linear champion Larry Holmes, as a special guest. Chuck Hull was the ring announcer for the night, introducing the boxers to the public in attendance.

The judges, assigned by the Nevada State Athletic Commission, were Jerry Roth, Carol Polis and Mike Glienna. The referee was Joey Curtis.

The fight, scheduled for fifteen-rounds, started very fast, as both boxers came out of their corners looking to throw many punches in combinations. Champion Weaver and challenger Dokes met at ring-center right away. Dokes charged at Weaver right away and started throwing lefts and rights at the champion. Weaver then grabbed him before connecting with a big left hook that stunned Dokes. Another punch, this time a right hook, by the champion made Dokes buckle his right knee, but Dokes kept trading blows with the former United States Marine.

Dokes gained a positional advantage when he landed a left on Weaver's chin; seconds later, he staggered the champion with another left hook to the same area before depositing him on the floor with another left hook. Weaver got up and received a protective-eight seconds count by referee Curtis, and was allowed to continue fighting, but he got pinned against a corner and Dokes launched an all-out attack at him there. Weaver tried a left which missed its intended target and Dokes kept firing from all angles, with Weaver mostly just covering up. A series of rights by the challenger as well as two lefts followed, after which Curtis stepped between them as if to separate the contestants. At that moment, however, Curtis raised Dokes' hand signaling that he (Curtis) was stopping the fight and awarding Dokes the title via a first-round technical knockout. Dokes jumped up with his fists in the air in jubilation for being the new WBA world Heavyweight champion. The contest had only lasted a total of 63 seconds, being stopped at one minute and three seconds of round one.

Several subplots followed the short fight: as he celebrated, Dokes landed hard on his left knee and fell to the canvas, needing medical attention. Also, Weaver and his camp demonstrated displeasure at the stoppage and a mini riot between both camps took place inside the ring; the riot was placated soon afterwards by the hotel's on-site security personnel. And the crowd was not satisfied, as they chanted "bullshit!" and "Don King sucks!", chants which were audible to the television audiences.

=== Investigation ===
Mike Weaver and his team claimed they felt the first fight between him and Dokes had been fixed. Because of that. the team, led by the former champion and his manager, Don Manuel, asked the WBA for a review of the bout.

Asked by a reporter if he thought the contest was a set-up, Weaver said "Yes, I am saying that!". Asked, again, if he thought Don King was the fixer, he asked "Who else?" in return.

The WBA launched an investigation, during which it was revealed that on the morning of the bout, Nevada State Athletic Commission officials, including referee Joey Curtis, had been warned to be proactive in stopping matches earlier, as this was four weeks after the death of South Korean boxer Duk Koo Kim in the 14th round against Ray Mancini at the same venue. Curtis himself admitted that he had been affected by Kim's death, as presiding physicians were in attendance at the Athletic Commission meeting.

Meanwhile, Weaver publicly apologized to Don King's adoptive son, Dokes' manager Carl King, for the earlier remarks he had done about the fight being fixed.

The WBA reunited in Panama in a meeting attended by the WBA president Gilberto Mendoza as well as members of the WBA's executive committee, medical doctors and boxing experts to analyze the bout and take a decision as far as what course they would take about the contest and its result. Mendoza told reporters that they viewed tapes of the contest three times. Ultimately, the WBA decided not to overturn the contest's result, retaining Dokes as their world Heavyweight champion, but ordering a rematch to take place soon. Weaver's manager, Don Manuel, responded by declaring that "Weaver and I are thankful to the association for the decision to repeat the fight".

Preceded by vs. James Tillis	Mike Weaver's bouts December 10, 1982	Succeeded by Rematch
Preceded by vs. Tommy Franco Thomas	Michael Dokes's bouts December 10, 1982	Succeeded by Rematch

== Second fight ==
The Crown Affair: Michael Dokes vs. Mike Weaver II
- Date: May 20, 1983
- Venue: Dunes Hotel and Casino, Las Vegas, Nevada
- Title(s) on the line: WBA Heavyweight title

Tale of the tape
Boxer	(United States) Michael Dokes	(United States) Mike Weaver
Nickname	"Dynamite"	"Hercules"
Hometown	Akron, Ohio	Los Angeles, California
Pre-fight record	26–0–1 (15 KO)	24–10 (16 KO)
Age	24 years, 9 months	31 years, 11 months
Height	6 ft 3 in (191 cm)	6 ft 1 in (185 cm)
Weight	223 lb (101 kg)	218 1/2 lb (99 kg)
Style	Orthodox	Orthodox
Recognition	WBA; Heavyweight Champion; The Ring; No. 1 Ranked Heavyweight	WBA; No. 1 Ranked Heavyweight; The Ring; No. 2 Ranked Heavyweight

Result
- Majority draw

The second Dokes-Weaver contest is considered a classic by many; websites such as thefightcity.com and others mentioning them among the greatest 25 or so fights to have ever taken place in the Heavyweight division.

Jimmy Lennon was the rematch's ring announcer, introducing champion Dokes and challenger Weaver to the attending crowds. The referee was Richard Steele. The fight's judges were Larry Hazzard, Harold Lederman and, for the second time, Jerry Roth. It was contested on Friday, May 20, 1983, at the Dunes Hotel and Casino in Las Vegas, as part of a program that included the Ossie Ocasio versus Randy Stephens WBA world Cruiserweight championship and Larry Holmes versus Tim Witherspoon WBC world Heavyweight championship contests, effectively completing what was then a rare world championship boxing triple-header program. Being put together along with Holmes-Witherspoon, Dokes-Weaver II became part of history as the first time two world Heavyweight championship bouts took place on the same date. The entire show was nicknamed "The Crown Affair".

As in their first encounter, both boxers came out aggressive to start their rematch. Early on, Dokes hurt his left hand. By round five, Dokes was on the defensive, and in round nine, Weaver landed a tremendous left-hook that hurt Dokes. But Dokes kept fighting. By round 12, Weaver was bleeding from various cuts to his face. In the thirteenth and fourteenth rounds, Weaver hurt Dokes to the champion's body with a series of left-hooks. By the time the fifteenth round began, both seemed significantly tired, but the pair fired punches until the final bell sounded to signal the end of the contest.

When the scorecards for this bout were read, judge Roth had the fight 145-141 for Dokes, but judge Hazzard and judge Lederman out-ruled him by scoring the fight a tie each at 144-144 and 143-143, respectively, resulting in the fight being declared a majority draw and Dokes retaining the WBA title. It was the first time in 69 years, dating back to the contest between Jack Johnson and Battling Jim Johnson on December 19, 1913, that a world Heavyweight championship contest resulted in a draw.

== Aftermath ==
As it turns out, neither Dokes nor Weaver won another world title fight in their careers.

=== Michael Dokes ===
Dokes went on to lose the WBA world Heavyweight title in his very next contest to Gerrie Coetzee and only fought for a world Heavyweight title again once in his career, losing to Riddick Bowe by a first-round knockout on February 6, 1993, at the Madison Square Garden in New York. Having also previously lost to Evander Holyfield and to "Razor Ruddock", (in an undercard headlined by a world title fight between Edwin Rosario and Juan Nazario that also included a Weaver bout against James Smith) " He retired with a record of 53 wins, 6 losses and 2 draws (ties) in 61 fights, with 34 wins and 5 losses by knockout.

The Holyfield vs. Dokes contest is considered a classic war by experts and publications such as Ring Magazine.

Dokes faced a myriad of problems after he lost the Heavyweight title; in 1986, he was arrested in Las Vegas, accused of cocaine trafficking. He was given two years of probation. In the late 1980s, Dokes began dating a woman who later accused him of domestic violence and of sexual assault. During that case's trial, she alleged that when Dokes was sober, he was a good person but that when on drugs and alcohol, he turned violent and that she was punched and sexually assaulted by Dokes after she arrived home at 5 am one early morning following a musical concert she had attended.

Also, in 1993, police in Florida accused Dokes of running down a vendor after drinking and using drugs. Dokes battled alcoholism and drug addiction.

Dokes died of liver cancer on Saturday, August 11, 2012, at a hospice in his hometown of Akron.

=== Mike Weaver ===
For his part, Weaver obtained three consecutive wins after the Dokes rematch and then challenged Pinklon Thomas for Thomas' WBC world Heavyweight title on Saturday, June 15, 1985, at the Riviera Hotel and Casino in Las Vegas, losing by an eighth-round knockout after another competitive fight. He and James Smith fought in the program in which Dokes battled Donovan Ruddock, losing to Smith by a 12-rounds unanimous decision at the Madison Square Garden on Wednesday, April 4, 1990, as part of a show headlined by a WBA world Lightweight championship bout between Puerto Ricans Edwin Rosario and Juan Nazario.

On July 12, 1991, Weaver gave future International Boxing Hall of Fame member Lennox Lewis a test before losing by a sixth-round technical knockout at the Caesar's Tahoe Outdoor Arena in Stateline, Nevada, as part of a card whose headliners were Tony Lopez and Lupe Gutierrez for Lopez's IBF's world Junior Lightweight championship.

Weaver retired after another sixth-round technical knockout loss; this time in a rematch with Larry Holmes on Friday, November 17, 2000, at the Mississippi Coast Coliseum in Biloxi, Mississippi, as part of a "boxing legends" program. He had a record of 41 wins, 18 losses and 1 draw (tie) in professional boxing, with 28 wins and 12 losses by knockout.

One of eleven siblings which included 8 brothers and 2 sisters and also included triplet brothers Floyd, Lloyd and Troy Weaver, Mike Weaver has largely stayed out of the spotlight after his boxing career was over, and he has followed a life largely led by his Christian faith.

Preceded by First Match	Michael Dokes's bouts May 20, 1983	Succeeded by vs. Gerrie Coetzee
Preceded by First Match	Mike Weaver's bouts May 20, 1983	Succeeded by vs. Stan Ward
