= Richfield Coliseum =

Arena in Ohio, United States

- The Palace on the Prairie

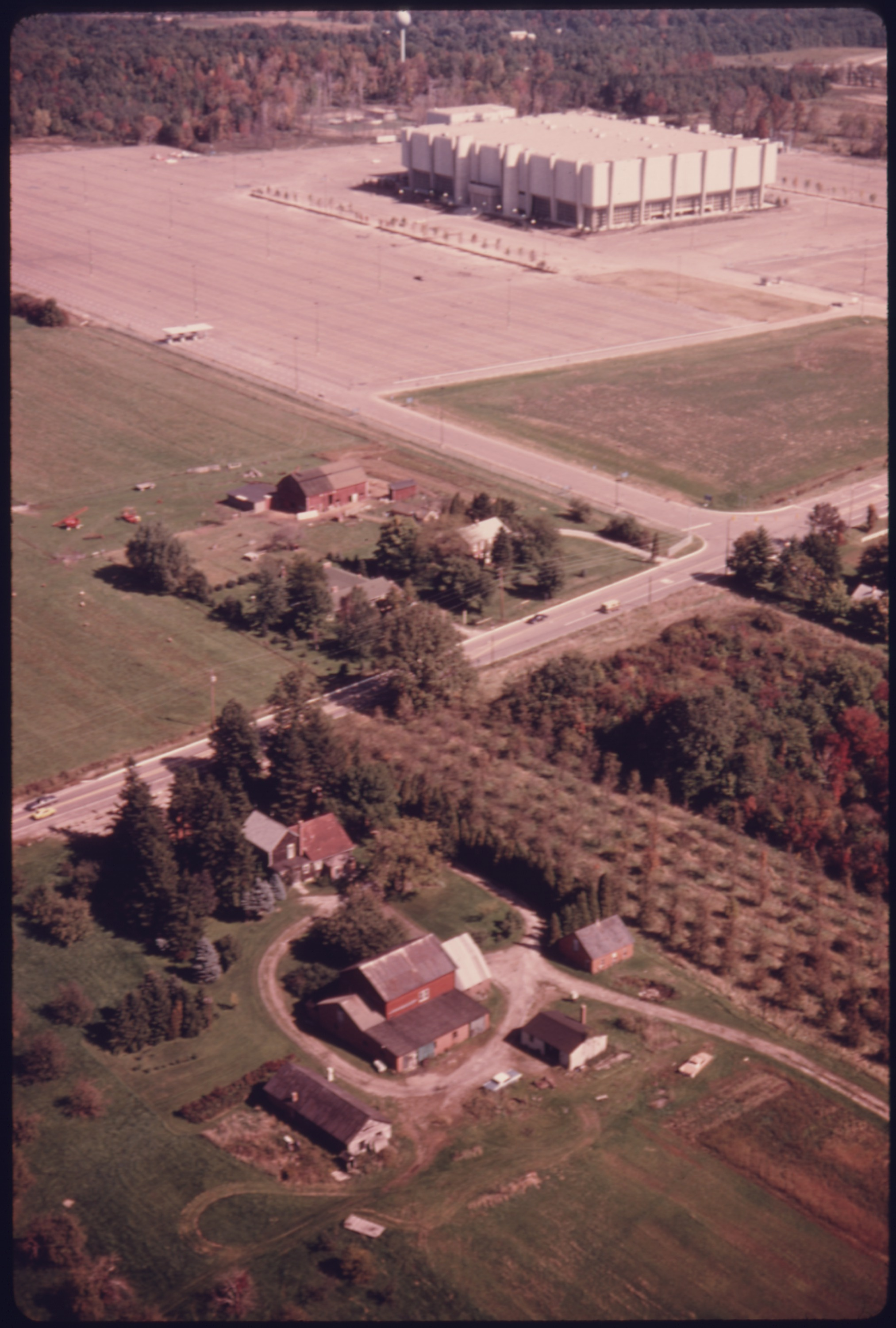
- Aerial view of the Coliseum and neighboring farms in 1975
- Interactive map of Richfield Coliseum
- Address: 2923 Streetsboro Road
- Location: Richfield Township, Ohio
- Coordinates: 41°14′43″N 81°35′38″W
- Owner: Gund Business Enterprises, Inc.
- Operator: Gund Business Enterprises, Inc.
- Capacity: Basketball: 20,273; Ice hockey: 18,544

Construction
- Groundbreaking: March 16, 1973
- Opened: October 26, 1974
- Closed: September 24, 1994
- Demolished: March–May 1999
- Cost: US$36 million ($261 million in 2025 dollars)
- Architects: George E. Ross Architects, Inc.

Tenants
- Cleveland Crusaders (WHA) (1974–1976); Cleveland Cavaliers (NBA) (1974–1994); Cleveland Nets (WTT) (1975–1977); Cleveland Barons (NHL) (1976–1978); Cleveland Force (MISL) (1978–1988); Cleveland Crunch (MISL) (1989–1992); Cleveland Lumberjacks (IHL) (1992–1994); Cleveland Thunderbolts (AFL) (1992–1994)

Richfield Coliseum, also known as the Coliseum at Richfield, was an indoor arena located in Richfield Township, between Cleveland and Akron, Ohio. It opened in 1974 as a replacement for the Cleveland Arena, and had a seating capacity of 20,273 for basketball. It was the main arena for the Northeast Ohio region until 1994, when it was replaced by Gund Arena (now Rocket Arena) in downtown Cleveland. The Coliseum stood vacant for five years before it was purchased and demolished in 1999 by the National Park Service. The site of the building was converted to a meadow and is now part of Cuyahoga Valley National Park.

The arena was primarily the home to the Cleveland Cavaliers of the National Basketball Association (NBA), developed by Cavaliers owner Nick Mileti, who also owned the Cleveland Crusaders of the World Hockey Association. Over the years it had additional tenants such as the Cleveland Barons of the National Hockey League, Cleveland Force of Major Indoor Soccer League, Cleveland Crunch of Major Indoor Soccer League, the Cleveland Lumberjacks of the International Hockey League, and the Cleveland Thunderbolts of the Arena Football League.

It hosted the 1981 NBA All-Star Game; The Buckeye Homecoming, the 1983 professional boxing match between Michael Dokes and Gerrie Coetzee; and the 1985 MISL All Star Game. It was also the site of the March 24, 1975 boxing match between Muhammad Ali and Chuck Wepner, which in part inspired the movie Rocky.

== Concerts ==
The Coliseum was a regular concert venue, with its first event being a concert by Frank Sinatra. The first rock concert at the Richfield Coliseum, in October 1974, featured Stevie Wonder in October 1974. The last concert was by Roger Daltrey, in 1994; that was also the last official event at the arena.

The Grateful Dead played thirteen shows at the Coliseum - the first on September 7, 1990, and the last on March 21, 1994.

== History ==
The arena, which opened in 1974, replaced the Cleveland Arena, which had 12,500+ boxing capacity, 10,000+ otherwise. The new arena seated 20,273 for basketball and 18,544 for hockey, and was one of the first indoor arenas to contain luxury boxes. Cavaliers founder Nick Mileti was the driving force behind the Coliseum's construction, believing that its location in northern Summit County south of Cleveland near the confluence of the Ohio Turnpike and Interstates 77 and 271 was ideally suited given the growth of urban sprawl.

While Cleveland Arena had once been one of the finest arenas in the country when it opened in 1937, it had not aged well by the time the Cavs arrived. It also had little parking. City officials balked at a downtown replacement, leading Mileti to turn his attention to the suburbs. The Michael Dokes vs. Gerrie Coetzee professional boxing match was held at the Richfield Coliseum on September 23, 1983. That match was televised by HBO and contested for the WBA heavyweight world championship.

The Coliseum was built in Richfield to draw fans from both of Northeast Ohio's major cities, as nearly five million Ohioans lived within less than an hour's drive (in good weather) from the Coliseum. While the arena's location hindered attendance somewhat, the Cavaliers' average attendance was over 18,000 per game each of the last two seasons at the Coliseum. In a 2012 interview with ESPN's Bill Simmons, basketball great Larry Bird said that it was his favorite arena to play in. The Coliseum was the site of Bird's final game in the NBA.

The Force also drew well at Richfield: 20,174 attended when Cleveland took on Minnesota on April 6, 1986, still the largest regular-season crowd (and the third-largest overall) ever to see an indoor soccer match in the US.

The World Wrestling Federation also promoted several notable pay-per-view shows at the arena, including Saturday Night's Main Event VII (taped September 13, 1986); Survivor Series (1987); Survivor Series (1988); and Survivor Series (1992)

=== Attendance hindrances ===
Though a large arena at the time of construction, it had only one concourse for both levels, which made for very cramped conditions when attendance was anywhere close to capacity. The Coliseum's real drawback was that the revenue-producing luxury suites were at the uppermost level and, as such, were the worst seats in the house. This situation was rectified at Gund Arena, where the suites were much closer to the playing area.

Also hurting attendance was the arena's location at the interchange of Interstate 271 and Ohio State Route 303, which was a rural, two-lane highway outside of Richfield. The rural location made the Coliseum inaccessible to anyone without an automobile, and as the only true access to the arena was directly at the interchange, traffic became an issue with every Coliseum event, especially when attendance was anywhere near capacity.

=== Demolition and environmental remediation ===
The Coliseum's fate was sealed in 1990, when voters in Cuyahoga County approved a new sin tax to fund the Gateway Sports and Entertainment Complex, which included Gund Arena. The Cavaliers moved to Gund Arena at the beginning of the 1994–95 season.

In 1997, the hardwood floor was sold to Grace Christian School of Staunton, Virginia.

After being vacant for five years, the arena was torn down in 1999, between March 30 and May 21, and the arena footprint and surrounding parking areas were allowed to be returned to woodland as part of the Cuyahoga Valley National Recreation Area, now Cuyahoga Valley National Park. Two years later it was noted that the site appeared to have no trace of the former building, although a widened section of Route 303, as well as the remains of the parking lot entrance, reveal its location.

The site is now a grassy meadow and has become an important area for wildlife. Birds such as the Eastern meadowlark, bobolink, and various sparrows now inhabit the area. This has caused the site to become popular with local birders.

=== Seating capacity ===
The seating capacity for basketball was:

Years	Capacity
1974–1988	20,900
1988–1994	20,273

Events and tenants
Preceded by Cleveland Arena	Home of the Cleveland Cavaliers; 1974–1994	Succeeded by Gund Arena/Quicken Loans Arena/Rocket Mortgage FieldHouse/Rocket Arena
Preceded by Oakland Coliseum Arena (Team was known as California Golden Seals)	Home of the Cleveland Barons; 1976–1978	Succeeded by Met Center (Team merged with Minnesota North Stars)
Preceded by Capital Centre	Host of the NBA All-Star Game; 1981	Succeeded by Brendan Byrne Arena
