= Joe Santarpia =

American boxing referee

Joe Santarpia was an American professional boxing referee.

== Boxing career ==
Santarpia began his career as an amateur boxer and made it all the way to the semi-finals in the New York Golden Gloves. He then went on to become the captain of an American boxing team that competed against England's team in the Internationals. On that team was three time world champ Carlos Ortiz. Santarpia sustained an injury to his left eye forcing him to make unwanted adjustments for his future vocation.

== Professional boxing referee ==
Santarpia then began his career as a professional referee in 1973. During his career as a referee he has been in the ring with many greats such as Marvelous Marvin Hagler, James "Bonecrusher" Smith, Vinny Paz (Panzienza), Pernell Whitaker, Howard Davis, Jr. to name a few.

Santarpia was in the ring in 1988 for the last scheduled 15 round fight in the United States in which Buddy McGirt knockout Howard Davis, Jr. in the first round to capture the title. In 1993, at Madison Square Garden, Santarpia officiated the big title fight between Riddick Bowe and Michael Dokes. He stopped the contest at 2:19 in the first round to give Bowe the victory amidst general criticism, a decision the former referee continues to defends. In April 2000, he refereed the fight that ended when Wladimir Klitschko knocked out David Bostice also at Madison Square Garden.

Santarpia has also refereed fights internationally in Italy, England and Denmark.

== Other boxing-related pursuits ==
In addition to being a professional boxing referee, Santarpia also owned a gym and trained fighters. He passed on his boxing genes and knowledge to his son Michael Santarpia who, like his Dad was a New York Golden Gloves boxer.Michael Santarpia also compiled a 14-2 boxing record on the club fight circuit.

== Awards ==
In 2012, Santarpia was honoured by Ring 10 Veteran's Boxing Foundation and awarded the Arthur Mercante Service Award.
