= John R. Branca =

American politician

John Ralph Branca (July 14, 1924 – July 17, 2010) was an American Democratic politician who was elected to two terms in the New York State Assembly, and was appointed as Chairman of the New York State Athletic Commission in 1983, where he sought to implement changes to enhance the safety of boxers and wrestlers.

== Life ==
Branca was born on July 14, 1924. He grew up in Mount Vernon, New York, where he played baseball with his younger brother Ralph at A. B. Davis High School. At A.B. Davis High School, he was undefeated as a pitcher, throwing two no-hitters, and as a senior was named the New York Metropolitan Area baseball player of the year. In an obituary in The New York Times, his brother Ralph, who played in the major leagues for the Brooklyn Dodgers, said that "He was better than me at that point". He served in the United States Army Air Forces during World War II. After completing his military service he attended New York University where he earned a bachelor's and master's degrees.

He was a coach and teacher at the local high school and served as Mount Vernon's recreation commissioner from 1962 to 1980. In 1962 he was appointed Commissioner of Recreation for the city of Mt. Vernon, a position he served for 19 years under five different administrations, both Democratic and Republican. As Commissioner, Mr. Branca pioneered the approach of providing needed services and activities for senior citizens, the handicapped and mentally challenged who might have had to seek institutional settings. Mr. Branca received national awards for his initiative and approach to recreation and programs. He greatly expanded and improved the summer youth programs, as well as athletics and recreation programs. John also oversaw the management of Memorial Field, the field he played on as a youth, he constructed the first indoor tennis bubble in the state of New York, giving citizens access to tennis 24 hours a day, 365 days a year. John also built a one-of-a-kind indoor bocce court at Hartley Park, as part of the Senior Citizen Center. John attracted headliner entertainers to Mt. Vernon such as Bob Hope, The Jackson Five, Pat Cooper, and Ella Fitzgerald. Memorial Field was cited as the most active field in New York State by Governor Hugh Carry in the mid 1970s. John received a Humanitarian Award from the B’Nai B’Rith, and was inducted into the Westchester County Sports Hall of Fame in 1977. John served as Secretary of the Executive Committee of New York State Recreation and Parks Society, and as President of the Westchester County Recreation and Park Society. He also served as Chairman of the Budget Committee on Programs and Services for Handicapped in Westchester County. He served as coordinating council of the Westchester Mental Health Board and task force chairman for the development of recreational facilities for the handicapped. In addition to Commissioner of Recreation, in 1972 John became a Radio Sports Announcer at WVOX, broadcasting the Pepsi High school Game of the week in Basketball, Football, Baseball and Hockey.

In 1980 John was elected Assemblyman – 88th District, New York State. Serving; Mt. Vernon, Yonkers, New Rochelle and Pelham. His Committees: Education – Housing – Tourism, Sports and the Arts, Social Services – Veterans and Aging. John chaired the subcommittee on Rent Administration and Code Enforcement. He was a member of the New York State Assembly from 1981 to 1983, sitting in the 184th and 185th New York State Legislatures. As a junior Assemblyman; he introduced legislation that brought 46 million dollars in State aid for schools and youth programs. He also obtained forty-five thousand dollars for the Russian Jewish Resettlement program. In his rookie year as Assemblyman, John opened storefront district offices. He was the first Assemblyman to do this in the State of New York, providing easy access to his constituents in Mt. Vernon, Yonkers, New Rochelle, and Pelham. The Governor of New York Mario Cuomo said, ‘I’ve seen him do more in his first term in Albany that many legislators do in a lifetime, but John is best known for his concern for people.’

Governor Mario Cuomo appointed John Branca Chairman of The New York State Athletic Commission in 1983, John reorganized and professionalized the New York State Athletic Commission, revitalizing the boxing industry in New York State. He was appointed by Governor Mario Cuomo as Chairman of the New York State Athletic Commission, with the goal "to revitalize and professionalize the boxing profession". As commissioner, he pushed for the use of thumbless boxing gloves, added portable computers at ringside to allow officials to verify the boxing records of late substitutions on a card and supported the creation of a national system to track boxers after questions had been raised after the brain injury death of lightweight Isidro Perez after being knocked out in a fight to Juan Ramon Cruz in October 1983 at the Felt Forum at Madison Square Garden.

Branca announced that he would have all three judges be women for a middleweight title fight between Marvelous Marvin Hagler and Mustafa Hamsho, calling the move "a great publicity gimmick". After Pat Petronelli suggested that "there's going to be a lot of blood and I don't want the three judges throwing up", Eva Shain was the only woman to judge the fight. He resigned from the athletic commission in November 1984, 16 months after taking on the post, to run for Mayor of Mount Vernon, following the death of Thomas Sharpe in February.

A resident of Deerfield Beach, Florida, Branca died at age 86 on July 17, 2010, due to vascular disease while at a hospice in Boca Raton, Florida. He was survived by his wife, Mildred, as well as by a daughter, two sons and four grandchildren. He was also survived by his brothers Ralph and Al.

New York State Assembly
Preceded by Richard C. Ross	New York State Assembly; 88th District; 1981–1983	Succeeded by Gregory P. Young
