= Evander Holyfield vs. Pinklon Thomas =

Boxing match

The Countdown Continues...
- Date: December 9, 1988
- Venue: Convention Hall, Atlantic City, New Jersey

Tale of the tape
Boxer	Evander Holyfield	Pinklon Thomas
Nickname	The Real Deal	Pinky
Hometown	Atlanta, Georgia, U.S.	Pontiac, Michigan, U.S.
Pre-fight record	19–0 (15 KO)	29–2–1 (24 KO)
Age	26 years, 1 month	30 years, 9 months
Height	6 ft 1 in (185 cm)	6 ft 3 in (191 cm)
Weight	210 lb (95 kg)	222 lb (101 kg)
Style	Orthodox	Orthodox
Recognition	WBA, WBC and IBF undisputed Cruiserweight Champion	IBF; No. 4 Ranked Heavyweight; Former WBC heavyweight champion

Result
- Holyfield wins via 7th-round corner retirement

Evander Holyfield vs. Pinklon Thomas, billed as The Countdown Continues..., was a professional boxing match contested on December 9, 1988.

== Background ==
In his previous fight, Evander Holyfield had defeated James Tillis by referee technical decision in his heavyweight debut. After Holyfield's victory, his next opponent was announced to be former WBC heavyweight champion Pinklon Thomas. In Thomas' previous fight, he had been knocked out by Mike Tyson in his first title shot since losing his WBC title in 1986 to Trevor Berbick. Following his loss to Tyson, Thomas had not fought since, going on a 16-month hiatus before agreeing to face Holyfield.

The winner of this fight was expected to next face former WBA heavyweight champion Michael Dokes, with the winner of that fight expected to be next in line for a shot at Mike Tyson's undisputed heavyweight championship. Dokes appeared on the undercard, defeating Rocky Sekorski by unanimous decision to retain the WBC Continental Americas heavyweight title.

== The fight ==
For the second consecutive fight, Holyfield would earn a victory as a result of a corner stoppage, this time after round seven. Though he again failed to gain a knockdown, he nevertheless dominated Thomas throughout, having won every round on two judge's scorecards while the third gave Thomas a single round. With Thomas having endured punishment for seven rounds, his trainer Angelo Dundee refused to let him go back for the eighth, giving Evander Holyfield the victory by referee technical decision.

== Aftermath ==
After the bout, Holyfield would give up his undisputed cruiserweight title to focus on his heavyweight campaign.

== Fight card ==
Confirmed bouts:

Weight Class	Weight		vs.		Method	Round	Time	Notes
Heavyweight	200+ lb	Evander Holyfield	def.	Pinklon Thomas	RTD	7/10
Heavyweight	200+ lb	Michael Dokes	def.	Rocky Sekorski	UD	12/12		^{Note 1}
Heavyweight	200+ lb	Phil Jackson	def.	Wendell Everett	UD	4/4
Lightweight	135 lb	Ricardo Salazar	def	Sterling Staton	UD	4/4
Super Middleweight	168 lb	Keith Providence	def.	Carlos Santiago	UD	4/4

^Note 1 For WBC Continental Americas heavyweight title

== Broadcasting ==
Country	Broadcaster
United States	Showtime

Preceded by vs. James Tillis	Evander Holyfield's bouts 9 December 1988	Succeeded by vs. Michael Dokes
Preceded by vs. Mike Tyson	Pinklon Thomas's bouts 9 December 1988	Succeeded by vs. Curtis Isaac
