= Eva Shain =

Eva Shain (November 24, 1917 – August 19, 1999) was an American boxing judge who was one of the first female judges in New York and became the first woman to judge a heavyweight championship bout when she was one of the judges at the 1977 fight between Muhammad Ali and Earnie Shavers in 1977 at Madison Square Garden.

Shain grew up in Jersey City, New Jersey, and attended New York University. She was employed as a bookkeeper and interior decorator when her husband, ring announcer Frank Shain, invited her to join him at a Golden Gloves amateur boxing fight in the 1960s. Though she had originally been reluctant "to watch two men beating each other up in the ring", she "totally fell in love with boxing" saying "it was such a precise science" and started attending fights regularly with her husband. She started judging amateur fights and in March 1975 became one of the first female professional boxing judges licensed by the New York State Athletic Commission, following in the footsteps of Carol Polis, who received her license several months earlier.

Shain was asked to judge the September 29, 1977, fight between Muhammad Ali and Earnie Shavers at Madison Square Garden just a few hours before the fight began. Ali was the unanimous winner, with Shain giving the champion 9 of 15 rounds. This made her the first woman to be a boxing judge for a heavyweight championship bout, which felt to her "like when an opera singer sings at the Met". Ali once asked her if she would be bothered if she got blood on her clothing while at a fight, and Shain responded "Well, it's not my blood".

New York State Athletic Commissioner John R. Branca announced that he would have all three judges be women for the October 1984 middleweight title fight between Marvelous Marvin Hagler and Mustafa Hamsho, saying "This fight needs some publicity". After Pat Petronelli suggested that "there's going to be a lot of blood and I don't want the three judges throwing up", Shain remained as the only woman to judge the fight.

In her career, she judged thousands of fights. She retired in 1998.

A resident of Fort Lee, New Jersey, Shain died at age 81 on August 19, 1999, of cancer at Englewood Hospital and Medical Center. She had a daughter and son from an earlier marriage.

== See also ==
- Carol Polis
