= Boxing judge =

A boxing judge is responsible for judging the results of a boxing match, with as many as three judges typically present at ringside to score the bout and assign points to the boxers, based on punches that connect, defense, knockdowns, and other, more subjective, measures. At the Olympic or World championship level, there are usually five judges.

A boxing match that has not ended in a knockout, technical knockout (TKO) or disqualification (DQ), having reached the limit on the preset number of rounds has "gone the distance" and the fighter with the higher score at the end of the fight is ruled the winner. With three judges, unanimous decisions and split decisions are possible, as are draws. Because of the open-ended style of boxing judging, fights may end with controversial results, in which one of the fighters may believe they have been "robbed" or unfairly denied a victory. A draw will result if all three judges call the fight even or if one judge favors one fighter, a second judge's card supports the other and the third calls the fight a draw. The March 1999 heavyweight unification bout between Evander Holyfield and Lennox Lewis at Madison Square Garden is an example of a draw where all three judges had scored the fight differently, with Eugenia Williams favoring Holyfield, Stanley Christodoulou favoring Lewis and Larry O'Connell calling the fight a draw. The result led to calls for an immediate rematch between the two fighters. The extremely rare majority draw results when two out of the three judges call the fight even, which means the fight will be called a draw regardless if the third judge favors one fighter. There are some scoring systems used in boxing that make it impossible for a judge to award equal points for a match. If a championship bout ends in a draw, the champion usually retains the title.

Boxing and boxing judging has historically been male-dominated. The first female boxing judge, Carol Polis, was appointed in 1973. Eva Shain, appointed as a judge a year after Polis by the New York State Athletic Commission, became the first woman to judge a heavyweight title fight, when she was one of three judges officiating as Earnie Shavers fought Muhammad Ali at Madison Square Garden on September 29, 1977.
