= Riddick Bowe vs. Michael Dokes =

1993 boxing match

The Homecoming
- Date: February 6, 1993
- Venue: Madison Square Garden, New York, New York, U.S.
- Title(s) on the line: WBA and IBF heavyweight titles

Tale of the tape
Boxer	Riddick Bowe	Michael Dokes
Nickname	Big Daddy	Dynamite
Hometown	Brooklyn, New York, U.S.	Akron, Ohio, U.S.
Purse	$7,000,000	$1,000,000
Pre-fight record	32–0 (27 KO)	50–3–2 (32 KO)
Age	25 years, 5 months	34 years, 5 months
Height	6 ft 5 in (196 cm)	6 ft 3 in (191 cm)
Weight	243 lb (110 kg)	244 lb (111 kg)
Style	Orthodox	Orthodox
Recognition	WBA and IBF; Heavyweight Champion; The Ring; No. 1 Ranked Heavyweight; The Ring No. 6 ranked pound-for-pound fighter	WBA; No. 8 Ranked Heavyweight; IBF; No. 11 Ranked Heavyweight; Former WBA heavyweight champion

Result
- Bowe wins via 1st-round TKO

Riddick Bowe vs. Michael Dokes, billed as The Homecoming, was a professional boxing match contested on February 6, 1993, for the WBA and IBF heavyweight championships. The fight emanated from Madison Square Garden in New York, New York.

The bout was Bowe's first since he wrested the undisputed world heavyweight championship from Evander Holyfield on November 13, 1992, in Las Vegas. Dokes was competing in his first world championship fight since 1983, when he lost the WBA championship in Richfield, Ohio to Gerrie Coetzee. Dokes was looking to join Floyd Patterson, Muhammad Ali, and Tim Witherspoon among the list of fighters who had lost a piece of the heavyweight championship and went on to win another.

== Background ==
The fight was carried by HBO as part of its HBO World Championship Boxing series. Jim Lampley was the lead commentator with Larry Merchant and George Foreman as analysts. It was the only televised fight on a six fight card.

Before the main event, a ten-bell salute was conducted in honor of former tennis player Arthur Ashe, who died earlier that afternoon from AIDS-related pneumonia.

After Bowe defeated Holyfield, the WBC ordered a mandatory defense of its championship against British contender Lennox Lewis, the 1988 Olympics super heavyweight gold medalist who had represented Canada and defeated Bowe, representing the United States, in the gold medal bout. However, since both sides had been in a massive dispute over terms of the fight (especially the purse), Bowe refused and in a memorable press conference on December 14, 1992, Bowe and his manager Rock Newman tossed the WBC belt into a wastepaper basket with Bowe stating "If Lennox wants this belt, he must get it out of the garbage and then we'll be calling him the garbage picker."

Shortly after, Bowe then announced that he would defend his WBA, IBF, and lineal titles against 34-year-old former WBA Heavyweight champion Michael Dokes After struggling with substance abuse, Dokes launched a successful comeback late in 1987 and proceeded to win his next eight fights en route to being named The Ring magazine's Comeback fighter of the Year for 1988, winning the WBC Continental Americas title and securing a number one contenders match with a then up-and-coming Evander Holyfield with the winner earning the right to challenge Mike Tyson. Dokes took Holyfield to the tenth round before falling to a TKO. Dokes' comeback was temporarily stopped when Donovan "Razor" Ruddock knocked him unconscious in the fourth round of a 1990 bout where Dokes lost the WBA Intercontinental championship. He returned in late 1991 and fought a series of journeyman fighters, recording nine bouts with nine wins, five by knockout, before facing Bowe.

Leading up to the fight, however, Dokes seemed to not be taking the fight as seriously as he should have. Various reports, including one in the Los Angeles Times, indicated that Dokes had stopped training altogether and was spending most of his time in New York eating massive meals and putting on significant amounts of weight. The Baltimore Sun cited an injury as the reason for Dokes’ stopping training, but he was declared physically capable at the weigh-in.

Regardless of the circumstances, oddsmakers for this fight did not consider Dokes to have much of a chance against Bowe. The champion had entered the fight as a 16-1 favorite.

== The Fight ==
Bowe came out firing early, constantly hammering Dokes with powerful combinations. Midway through the first round, Bowe landed a three-punch combination that knocked Dokes back into the ropes; since the ropes prevented Dokes from hitting the canvas, this was scored a knockdown and referee Joe Santarpia administered a standing eight count. Santarpia later said that, when he examined Dokes, he had "glassy" eyes, but he allowed the former champion to continue.

Bowe resumed the assault, backing Dokes into the ropes again and hitting him with a series of power punches. Dokes made little to no effort to counter the hard shots from Bowe, and Santarpia decided to call a halt to the proceedings at the 2:19 mark. Bowe was awarded the victory by technical knockout; this was the eleventh time he had knocked an opponent out in the first round, and was also the first time that a heavyweight championship fight had only gone one round since Mike Tyson vs. Carl Williams in 1989.

The crowd inside Madison Square Garden met the decision with chants of "bullshit" and gave a mixed reaction toward Bowe for his victory, with the HBO crew questioning whether or not Dokes really deserved a chance to fight Bowe.

Dokes, who protested the decision to stop the fight for several minutes afterward, called the decision "the worst officiating" he had ever seen and remarked that Santarpia had not even stopped to ask him if he was hurt, calling for an investigation into the decision. Santarpia, meanwhile, said that Dokes had, by his count, taken twenty consecutive punches from Bowe without putting up any defense.

Bowe, perhaps unsurprisingly, agreed with Santarpia's call; in fact, he actually believed that Santarpia had let the overmatched former champion fight too long and that he might have killed him in the ring if the fight had not been stopped when it had been. On the HBO broadcast, George Foreman seemed to echo this, saying that he was surprised the fight went as long as it did and that Santarpia had given Dokes more than enough of a chance to prove he could defend himself from Bowe. Furthermore, the punch statistics from the fight bore this out; Dokes only managed to land twelve of the twenty-five punches he threw, nine of which were jabs. Bowe, meanwhile, landed a total of fifty-five punches, thirty-seven of which were scored as power shots.

== Aftermath ==
In the match before the main event, former WBO champion Ray Mercer took on former contender turned journeyman fighter Jesse Ferguson in a fight that was supposed to be a tuneup fight for Mercer, who was at the time a highly ranked contender and in line for a title shot against his former Olympic teammate Bowe. Mercer had only suffered one defeat to that point in his career, an upset loss to former champion Larry Holmes, while Ferguson had recorded a 5–9 record after winning his first thirteen fights. Despite Mercer being the favorite, Ferguson outfought him over ten rounds and won a unanimous decision. This fight was controversial as it was discovered that Mercer tried to bribe Ferguson into letting Mercer win during the match.

Bowe's camp decided to offer a shot to Ferguson instead of Mercer, and that fight would be Bowe's next title defense.

== Undercard ==
Confirmed bouts:

Among the other fighters featured on the card were future light middleweight champion Raul Marquez, heavyweight Alex Stewart, and eventual title contender David Tua.

== Broadcasting ==
Country	Broadcaster
United States	HBO

Preceded by vs. Evander Holyfield	Riddick Bowe's bouts 6 February 1993	Succeeded by vs. Jesse Ferguson
Preceded by vs. Barry Forbes	Michael Dokes's bouts 6 February 1993	Succeeded by vs. Dave Slaughter
