= Ray Mercer =

American boxer, kickboxer and mixed martial artist

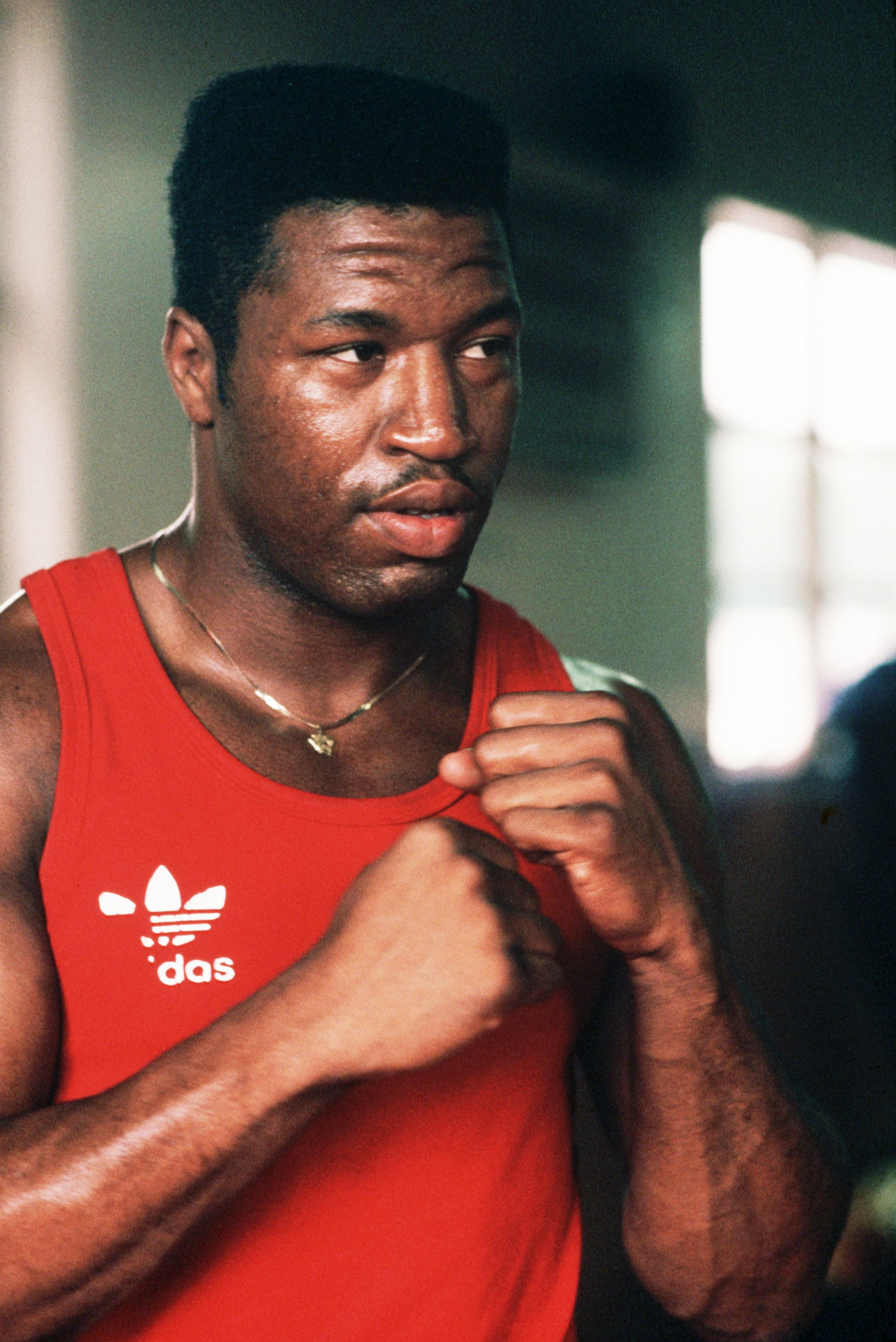
- Mercer in 1988
- Born: Raymond Anthony Mercer; April 4, 1961 (age 65); Jacksonville, Florida, U.S.
- Other names: Merciless
- Nationality: American
- Height: 6 ft 1 in (185 cm)
- Division: Heavyweight
- Reach: 77 in (196 cm)
- Stance: Orthodox
- Years active: 1989–2008 (boxing); 2004–2005 (kickboxing); 2007, 2009 (MMA)

Professional boxing record
- Total: 44
- Wins: 36
- By knockout: 26
- Losses: 7
- By knockout: 2
- Draws: 1

Kickboxing record
- Total: 2
- Losses: 2
- By knockout: 1

Mixed martial arts record
- Total: 1
- Wins: 1
- By knockout: 1
- Losses: 0

Other information
- Boxing record from BoxRec
- Mixed martial arts record from Sherdog
- Last updated on: April 5, 2023

Raymond Anthony Mercer (born April 4, 1961) is an American former professional boxer, kickboxer, and mixed martial artist who competed from 1989 to 2009. As an amateur, he won the heavyweight gold medal at the 1988 Summer Olympics.

In 1991, Mercer captured the WBO heavyweight world title and later successfully defended it against Tommy Morrison whom he previously decisioned 5-0 during 1988 Summer Olympics trials. He subsequently vacated the belt. Mercer was nicknamed "Merciless" for his punching power and aggressive fighting style, a moniker that followed him throughout his professional career.

Mercer competed as a professional kickboxer twice. In 2004, Mercer competed in a kickboxing match against four-time K-1 Japan tournament champion Musashi, losing by unanimous decision. He was TKO'd by a kick to the head by Remy Bonjasky in a kickboxing match in 2005.

Prior to his permanent retirement from combat sports, Mercer had a brief career in mixed martial arts. In 2007, he suffered a submission loss to former street fighter turned UFC fighter Kimbo Slice in the Cage Fury Fighting Championships promotion, and in 2009, scored a win over former two-time UFC heavyweight champion Tim Sylvia by first-round knockout, earning a Bazzie Award for Upset of the Year.

== Early life ==
Mercer is the son of retired NCO Raymond Mercer Sr. and spent his childhood in Fort Benning, Georgia and Hanau, West Germany as part of a military family. He later recalled:

"As a kid I was a little hardheaded. I had a tough time in school until my father, Raymond, he was a mechanic in the military, got me straight. When he was in the field, whether at Fort Benning, Georgia, or in Germany, I'd take advantage of my mother and act up. My father tried to get me to play some kind of sports. I was negative. Team sports wasn't in my blood. I'd come home and play Go-Karts or shoot BB guns or ride choppers. With my father, I was fishing by the age of nine and hunting by fourteen. We'd go for deer, rabbit, and squirrel at Fort Benning. My father had a good life in the military. I figured I'd do the same. I wanted to go back to Germany. I liked it over there."

Mercer played high school football as a linebacker in Hanau, Germany, and later graduated from Richmond County Academy in Augusta, Georgia. The following year, he enlisted in the United States Army.

== Military service ==
Mercer served with the U.S. Army Europe (USAREUR), under V Corps, in the infantry. He was stationed with Company D, 1st Battalion, 39th Infantry Regiment in Baumholder, West Germany. He achieved the rank of sergeant.

== Amateur boxing career ==
Mercer began boxing at age 23 while serving in the United States Army. He later stated that he had never worn gloves prior to his enlistment. "The Army taught me everything I know about boxing," explained Mercer. Mercer was offered the chance to avoid a 30-day field exercise by becoming a sparring partner for the post's heavyweight boxing champion.

His first organized bout came in 1983 at Schweinfurt, West Germany. After winning his battalion box-off, he went on to claim the brigade title. After that, Mercer claimed, "I won the VII Corps novice and open championships and finished second at U.S. Army, Europe." Mercer recalled being physically challenged early in his amateur career:

"I came back from that first day of sparring with a bleeding nose and my lips swollen. For two months, I got pounded. But then it became a challenge. I'm not a quitter. I figured the other guy learned the moves, so could I."

Mercer became the 1985 U.S. Army and inter-service heavyweight champion, alongside Wesley Watson, who was the inter-service super heavyweight title. That same year, Army Coach Hank Johnson sought to recruit Mercer for a stateside training camp for the 1988 Olympics, Mercer turned down the offer.

Throughout the late 1980s, Mercer continued to compete successfully in military-sponsored competitions. He won three USAREUR crowns while carrying the banner for V Corps, with his first victory coming less than a year after his first amateur fight. While still serving with USAREUR, Mercer had several more amateur bouts in Germany between 1986 and 1987, and he also competed internationally in Western European open tournaments.

In the summer of 1988, he won the inter-service heavyweight championship again, before applying for the all-Army boxing trial camp to win a spot on the Army team. Mercer won the 1988 United States amateur heavyweight championship. At the USA vs. Cuba match-up, he twice staggered Félix Savón, but was impeded from doing further damage by the Cuban referee, Alfredo Toledo. Mercer subsequently defeated Yugoslavian Željko Mavrović to win the tournament.

=== 1988 Olympics ===
Mercer was the oldest member of the US boxing team at the 1988 Summer Olympics. Despite this, many regarded him as one of the team's most talented boxers. During the games, Muhammad Ali's former trainer Angelo Dundee noted that Mercer and teammate Andrew Maynard each had the potential to develop into world champions after becoming professionals. Dundee claimed that "Mercer's 27, but that's not too old. The maturity is there. And the punch. Give him 10 fights as a pro and he'd be ready to start moving up." According to Kelvin Richardson of the '88 All-Army Team, Mercer was such a hard puncher that he frequently knocked his sparring partners out of the ring, even while wearing 16-ounce gloves. As a result, his super heavyweight Olympic teammate Riddick Bowe avoided sparring with him.

Prior to the start of the Olympics, Mercer's fellow soldiers in Germany signed a large banner for him and shipped it to Seoul. During a post-fight interview, he described the significance of their support to the audience, saying "That banner really picked me up. I'm fighting for the people of the United States, but especially for the ones back in my unit."

Mercer knocked out all four of his Olympic opponents en route to winning gold as a heavyweight. He was named the United States Armed Forces Athlete of the Year in November 1988 following his Olympic victory. In January 1989, Mercer was honorably discharged from the Army and began his professional boxing career.

== Professional boxing career ==
Mercer began his professional boxing career in January 1989, winning his debut bout via a third-round TKO against Jesse McGhee. In August 1990, he knocked down and outpointed Bert Cooper in a 12-round brawl that earned him Cooper's NABF title.

=== Final fights ===
Mercer retired in 2008 as a one-time major title holder with a record of 36–7–1 (26 KOs).

== Mixed martial arts career ==
Mercer explored mixed martial arts as early as 2003 when he was scheduled to face Kazuyuki Fujita, who was 9–4 across his MMA career. The fight was to be held in Kobe, Japan as the main event of the Inoki Bom-Ba-Ye in an MMA ring. However, the bout was cancelled after Mercer missed his flight to the country.

On March 21, 2007, Cage Fury Fighting Championships announced that Mercer had signed to face underground street fighter Kimbo Slice at Atlantic City's Boardwalk Hall as part of Cage Fury Fighting Championship 5. The bout was a non-sanctioned exhibition under the New Jersey Unified MMA rules, with both men making their professional MMA debuts. Slice won the fight in the first round with a guillotine choke submission. Afterwards, Mercer said he would be sticking with boxing since he "can't get choked out in boxing."

On June 13, 2009, Mercer made his professional MMA debut against former two-time UFC Heavyweight Champion, Tim Sylvia, at Adrenaline MMA 3: Bragging Rights in Birmingham, Alabama. It was reported that they had tried to make the fight initially as a boxing match, but was unable to get sanctioning due to Mercer being a former champ, and Sylvia having no boxing record. Before the fight, they allegedly had an agreement to treat it as a boxing match, but in the opening seconds of the match, Sylvia threw a low calf kick at Mercer. Seconds later, Mercer comes in with an overhand right that drops Sylvia and leads to Mercer winning by KO in just 9 seconds.

In March 2010, it was announced that Mercer had signed with the King of the Cage organization, but no bouts materialized. At 1–0, he was scheduled to face at the time undefeated MMA fighter and Kickboxer Ron Sparks, but the bout was cancelled due to a lingering injury Mercer had sustained 13 years earlier.

== Professional boxing record ==
44 fights	36 wins	7 losses
By knockout	26	2
By decision	10	5
Draws	1	

No.	Result	Record	Opponent	Type	Round, time	Date	Location	Notes
44	Win	36–7–1	Richel Hersisia	MD	6	Sep 5, 2008	Nöjesfabriken, Karlstad, Sweden	
43	Loss	35–7–1	Derric Rossy	UD	12	Jan 26, 2008	Venetian Arena, Macau, SAR	For vacant WBC–ABCO, WBF International, and WBO–NABO interim heavyweight titles
42	Win	35–6–1	Mikael Lindblad	KO	1, 1:50	Sep 15, 2007	Löfbergs Arena, Karlstad, Sweden	
41	Loss	34–6–1	Shannon Briggs	KO	7 (10), 0:41	Aug 26, 2005	Hard Rock Live, Hollywood, Florida, U.S.	
40	Win	34–5–1	Darroll Wilson	UD	10	Jun 24, 2005	Nikki Beach Concert Arena, Atlantic City, New Jersey, U.S.	
39	Win	33–5–1	Steve Pannell	TKO	3 (10), 0:50	Feb 28, 2004	Seminole Casino, Coconut Creek, Florida, U.S.	
38	Win	32–5–1	Shawn Robinson	TKO	3 (10), 1:49	Nov 11, 2003	Caesars, Elizabeth, Indiana, U.S.	
37	Win	31–5–1	Mario Cawley	KO	3 (10), 1:08	Aug 23, 2003	Seminole Casino, Coconut Creek, Florida, U.S.	
36	Loss	30–5–1	Wladimir Klitschko	TKO	6 (12), 1:08	Jun 29, 2002	Etess Arena, Atlantic City, New Jersey, U.S.	For WBO heavyweight title
35	Win	30–4–1	Troy Weida	TKO	1 (10), 0:28	Feb 23, 2002	Bally's Park Place, Atlantic City, New Jersey, U.S.	
34	Win	29–4–1	Brian Scott	KO	2 (10), 0:57	Oct 13, 2001	Parken Stadium, Copenhagen, Denmark	
33	Win	28–4–1	Don Steele	KO	5 (10), 3:00	Mar 17, 2001	Silver Star Hotel & Casino, Choctaw, Mississippi, U.S.	
32	Win	27–4–1	Jeff Pegues	TKO	2 (10), 2:59	Feb 11, 2001	Grand Victoria Casino, Elgin, Illinois, U.S.	
31	Win	26–4–1	Jimmy Haynes	KO	1 (10), 0:43	Dec 18, 1999	Grand Casino, Tunica, Mississippi, U.S.	
30	Win	25–4–1	Leo Loiacono	KO	2 (10), 0:46	Feb 21, 1998	Miccosukee Resort & Gaming, Miami, Florida, U.S.	
29	Win	24–4–1	Tim Witherspoon	UD	10	Dec 14, 1996	Convention Hall, Atlantic City, New Jersey, U.S.	
28	Loss	23–4–1	Lennox Lewis	MD	10	May 10, 1996	Madison Square Garden, New York City, New York, U.S.	
27	Loss	23–3–1	Evander Holyfield	UD	10	May 20, 1995	Convention Hall, Atlantic City, New Jersey, U.S.	
26	Draw	23–2–1	Marion Wilson	SD	10	Jul 28, 1994	Convention Hall, Atlantic City, New Jersey, U.S.	
25	Win	23–2	Jesse Ferguson	SD	10	Nov 19, 1993	Convention Hall, Atlantic City, New Jersey, U.S.	
24	Win	22–2	Mark Wills	UD	10	Oct 6, 1993	Broadway by the Bay Theater, Atlantic City, New Jersey, U.S.	
23	Win	21–2	Tony Willis	TKO	1 (10), 2:11	Aug 12, 1993	Casino Magic, Bay St. Louis, Mississippi, U.S.	
22	Loss	20–2	Jesse Ferguson	UD	10	Feb 6, 1993	Madison Square Garden, New York City, New York, U.S.	
21	Win	20–1	Jerry Halstead	RTD	2 (12), 3:00	Dec 10, 1992	Etess Arena, Atlantic City, New Jersey, U.S.	
20	Win	19–1	Mike Dixon	RTD	7 (10), 3:00	Oct 7, 1992	County Center, Augusta, Georgia, U.S.	
19	Loss	18–1	Larry Holmes	UD	12	Feb 7, 1992	Convention Hall, Atlantic City, New Jersey, U.S.	
18	Win	18–0	Tommy Morrison	TKO	5 (12), 0:28	Oct 18, 1991	Convention Hall, Atlantic City, New Jersey, U.S.	Retained WBO heavyweight title
17	Win	17–0	Francesco Damiani	KO	9 (12), 2:47	Jan 11, 1991	Etess Arena, Atlantic City, New Jersey, U.S.	Won WBO heavyweight title
16	Win	16–0	Bert Cooper	UD	12	Aug 5, 1990	Convention Hall, Atlantic City, New Jersey, U.S.	Won NABF heavyweight title
15	Win	15–0	Lionel Washington	TKO	4 (10), 1:59	May 31, 1990	Community War Memorial, Rochester, New York, U.S.	
14	Win	14–0	Kimmuel Odum	UD	12	Mar 2, 1990	Hacienda, Paradise, Nevada, U.S.	Won vacant IBF Inter-Continental heavyweight title
13	Win	13–0	Wesley Watson	TKO	5 (10), 0:44	Jan 15, 1990	Convention Hall, Atlantic City, New Jersey, U.S.	
12	Win	12–0	Ossie Ocasio	SD	8	Dec 7, 1989	The Mirage, Paradise, Nevada, U.S.	
11	Win	11–0	Jerry Jones	UD	8	Nov 14, 1989	South Mountain Arena, West Orange, New Jersey, U.S.	
10	Win	10–0	Eddie Richardson	TKO	1 (8), 2:16	Oct 17, 1989	State Fairgrounds, Phoenix, Arizona, U.S.	
9	Win	9–0	Arthel Lawhorne	TKO	2 (10), 1:05	Sep 19, 1989	Veterans Memorial Arena, Jacksonville, Florida, U.S.	
8	Win	8–0	Dino Homsey	TKO	1 (8), 1:58	Sep 5, 1989	Harrah's Lake Tahoe, Stateline, Nevada, U.S.	
7	Win	7–0	Tracy Thomas	KO	1 (6), 2:09	Aug 15, 1989	South Mountain Arena, West Orange, New Jersey, U.S.	
6	Win	6–0	Al Evans	TKO	1 (6), 2:55	Jul 15, 1989	Broadway by the Bay Theater, Atlantic City, New Jersey, U.S.	
5	Win	5–0	Ken Crosby	KO	1 (6), 2:45	Jun 12, 1989	Caesars Palace, Paradise, Nevada, U.S.	
4	Win	4–0	David Hopkins	KO	1 (4), 1:07	May 16, 1989	Tyndall Armory, Indianapolis, Indiana, U.S.	
3	Win	3–0	Garing Lane	UD	4	Mar 28, 1989	Showboat Hotel and Casino, Las Vegas, Nevada, U.S.	
2	Win	2–0	Luis Walford	KO	1 (4)	Mar 4, 1989	Civic Center, Bismarck, North Dakota, U.S.	
1	Win	1–0	Jesse McGhee	TKO	3 (4), 0:30	Feb 24, 1989	Convention Hall, Atlantic City, New Jersey, U.S.	

== Kickboxing record ==
0 Wins (0 (T) KO's, 0 decision), 2 Losses
Date	Result	Record	Opponent	Event	Method	Round	Time	Location
March 15, 2005	Loss	0–2	(Netherlands) Remy Bonjasky	K-1 World Grand Prix 2005 in Seoul	TKO (Right High Kick)	1	0:22	Seoul, South Korea
June 6, 2004	Loss	0–1	(Japan) Musashi	K-1 World Grand Prix 2004 in Nagoya	Decision (Unanimous)	3	3:00	Nagoya, Japan

== Mixed martial arts record ==
Professional record breakdown
1 match	1 win	0 losses
By knockout	1	0

=== Professional record ===
Res.	Record	Opponent	Method	Event	Date	Round	Time	Location	Notes
Win	1–0	Tim Sylvia	KO (punch)	Adrenaline MMA 3: Bragging Rights	June 13, 2009	1	0:09	Birmingham, Alabama, United States	Super Heavyweight debut.

=== Exhibition record ===
Professional record breakdown
1 match	0 wins	1 loss
By submission	0	1

Res.	Record	Opponent	Method	Event	Date	Round	Time	Location	Notes
Loss	0–1	Kimbo Slice	Submission (guillotine choke)	Cage Fury Fighting Championship 5	June 23, 2007	1	1:12	Atlantic City, New Jersey, United States	

Sporting positions
Amateur boxing titles
Previous: Michael Bentt	U.S. heavyweight champion 1988	Next: Javier Alvarez
Regional boxing titles
Preceded by Bert Cooper	NABF heavyweight champion August 5, 1990 – January 1991; Vacated	Vacant Title next held by Orlin Norris
World boxing titles
Preceded by Francesco Damiani	WBO heavyweight champion January 11, 1991 – December 28, 1991; Vacated	Vacant Title next held by Michael Moorer
