= Michael Dokes vs. Evander Holyfield =

Boxing match

A Date with Destiny
- Date: March 11, 1989
- Venue: Caesars Palace, Paradise, Nevada
- Title(s) on the line: WBC Continental Americas heavyweight title

Tale of the tape
Boxer	Michael Dokes	Evander Holyfield
Nickname	Dynamite	The Real Deal
Hometown	Akron, Ohio	Atlanta, Georgia
Pre-fight record	37–1–2 (23 KO)	20–0 (16 KO)
Age	30 years, 7 months	26 years, 4 months
Height	6 ft 3 in (191 cm)	6 ft 1 in (185 cm)
Weight	225 lb (102 kg)	208 lb (94 kg)
Style	Orthodox	Orthodox
Recognition	WBC/The Ring; No. 5 Ranked Heavyweight; WBA; No. 8 Ranked Heavyweight; IBF; No. 9 Ranked Heavyweight; WBC Continental Americas heavyweight champion Former WBA heavyweight champion	WBA; No. 2 Ranked Heavyweight; IBF; No. 4 Ranked Heavyweight; WBC; No. 6 Ranked Heavyweight; The Ring; No. 1 Ranked Heavyweight; Former undisputed cruiserweight champion

Result
- Holyfield won by 10th round TKO

Michael Dokes vs. Evander Holyfield, billed as "A Date with Destiny", was a professional boxing match contested on March 11, 1989 for the WBC Continental Americas heavyweight title.

== Background ==
On December 9, 1988, Evander Holyfield had easily defeated Pinklon Thomas via referee technical decision while on the same card Michael Dokes outpointed Rocky Sekorski to earn a unanimous decision victory. This officially set up a match between Holyfield and Dokes which was billed as "A Date with Destiny" as the winner was all but guaranteed a title shot against undisputed heavyweight champion Mike Tyson. Holyfield had had two fights as a heavyweight, easily winning both fights, though Dokes was seen as a step up in competition. Dokes had been a former WBA heavyweight champion, but issues with drug abuse forced him out of boxing in 1985. In late 1987 Dokes launched a successful comeback, going a perfect 8–0 and winning the WBC continental Americas heavyweight title along the way. Despite his success in the heavyweight division, where Holyfield had fought only twice, Dokes was instilled as massive 9–1 underdog though by the night of the fight the odds had fallen to 3–1.

== The fight ==
Dokes and Holyfield would engage in a fierce, back-and-forth fight in which both fighters would land big shots and hurt one another. Dokes charged at Holyfield from the opening bell and used a tactic of attacking with body shots while Holyfield tried to effectively counter-punch. Dokes would take charge in the third round, landing several clean power punches to Holyfield's head. In round six, Holyfield began taking control and opened up a cut above Dokes' left eye, which would hinder him the rest of the bout. In round 10, Holyfield landed consecutive left hooks that sent Dokes staggering into the ropes with Holyfield following with a hard right to Dokes head, referee Richard Steele then stepped in to stop the fight as Dokes fell to his knees. Holyfield was named the winner technical knockout at 1:41 of the round.

== Aftermath ==
Though the victory made Holyfield the number one ranked heavyweight by both the WBA and WBC and a match with Tyson was presumed to be next, Tyson's promoter Don King announced plans for Tyson to instead face Dokes rather than Holyfield. The proposed Tyson–Dokes bout never came to fruition as Dokes and his adviser Marty Cohen refused King's proposed 1.1 million dollar purse instead insisting on no less than 3 million dollars, King refused to budge to Dokes' demands and instead agreed to a deal with Donovan "Razor" Ruddock. With a Tyson match not in the cards for 1989, Holyfield instead agreed to face Brazilian prospect Adílson Rodrigues in the first defense of his Continental Americas heavyweight title. Holyfield would make quick work of Rodrigues, knocking him out in the second round.

== Fight card ==
Confirmed bouts:

Weight Class	Weight		vs.		Method	Round	Time	Notes
Heavyweight	200+ lb	Evander Holyfield	def.	Michael Dokes (c)	TKO	10/12		^{Note 1}
Lightweight	135 lb	John Duplessis	def.	Miguel Medina	KO	4/10
Super Lightweight	140 lb	Romallis Ellis	def.	Hernan Cortez	TKO	4/4
Welterweight	147 lb	Nick Ruda	def	Everett Ryan	TKO	1/4

^Note 1 For WBC Continental Americas heavyweight title

== Broadcasting ==
Country	Broadcaster
United States	Showtime

Preceded by vs. Rocky Sekorski	Michael Dokes's bouts 11 March 1989	Succeeded by vs. Bobby Crabtree
Preceded by vs. Pinklon Thomas	Evander Holyfield's bouts 11 March 1989	Succeeded by vs. Adílson Rodrigues
