= Rocky Sekorski =

American boxer

Personal information
- Nickname: Rocky Sekorski
- Nationality: American
- Born: Richard Sekorski; October 29, 1958 (age 68) Edgar, Wisconsin, U.S.
- Height: 5 ft 11 1/2 in (182 cm)
- Weight: Heavyweight

Boxing career
- Reach: 70 in (178 cm)
- Stance: Orthodox

Boxing record
- Total fights: 36
- Wins: 23
- Win by KO: 11
- Losses: 13
- Draws: 0

Richard Sekorski, alias Rocky Sekorski (born October 29, 1958), is an American retired heavyweight professional boxer.

== Professional career ==
Sekorski made his professional debut on January 21, 1981, with a four-round decision win against Rick Kellar. He won his first 13 professional matches, losing for the first time to 41-5-2 Marvin Camel on May 21, 1983, in Billings, Montana. Sekorski won three more times before his next loss, to 11-1 Pierre Coetzer in Johannesburg, South Africa. Sekorski continued to fight boxers of a high calibre, his biggest win being a sixth-round TKO of former heavyweight world champion Leon Spinks in Detroit Lakes, Minnesota on August 2, 1986. Sekorski won the vacant Minnesota State Heavyweight title with a 3rd-round TKO against Percell Davis in August 1988, then lost a fight for the WBC Continental Americas heavyweight title to former WBA heavyweight champion Michael Dokes in December of the same year. Thereafter Sekorski would lose more than he won, concluding his career with a loss to Jimmy Lee Smith on November 22, 1993.

Sekorski also lost a fight by TKO in the 3rd round to the returning George Foreman, not going down despite the hard-hitting Foreman landing several heavy punches. He was inducted into the Minnesota Boxing Hall of Fame in 2018.

Sekorski compiled a professional record of 23-11 with 13 wins by knockout during a twelve-year professional career.

== Professional boxing record ==
23 Wins (11 knockouts, 12 decisions), 13 Losses (4 knockouts, 9 decisions)
Result	Record	Opponent	Type	Round	Date	Location	Notes
Loss	10-3	(United States) Jimmy Lee Smith	PTS	4	22 Nov 1993	(United States) Mounds View, Minnesota, U.S.	
Loss	10-3-1	(United States) Craig Payne	TKO	6	14 Sep 1993	(United States) Atlantic City, New Jersey, U.S.	
Loss	10-4	(United Kingdom) Michael Murray	PTS	8	28 Nov 1992	Manchester, United Kingdom	
Loss	19-1	(United States) Alex Garcia	KO	1	23 May 1991	(United States) Las Vegas, Nevada, U.S.	
Win	15-26-2	(United States) Rick Kellar	SD	10	20 Mar 1990	(United States) Minneapolis, Minnesota, U.S.	
Loss	36-1-2	(United States) Michael Dokes	UD	12	9 Dec 1988	(United States) Atlantic City, New Jersey, U.S.	WBC Continental Americas Heavyweight Title.
Win	13-7	(United States) Percell Davis	RTD	2	2 Aug 1988	(United States) Saint Paul, Minnesota, U.S.	Minnesota Heavyweight Title.
Win	1-4	(United States) Jeff May	KO	2	9 May 1988	(United States) Saint Paul, Minnesota, U.S.	
Loss	49-2	(United States) George Foreman	TKO	3	18 Dec 1987	(United States) Las Vegas, Nevada, U.S.	Referee stopped the bout at 2:48 of the third round.
Win	8-2-2	(United States) Joey Christjohn	TKO	3	3 Jul 1987	(United States) Gardnerville, Nevada, U.S.	
Win	20-20	(United States) Walter Santemore	UD	10	9 May 1987	(United States) Duluth, Minnesota, U.S.	
Loss	21-2	(Brazil) Adílson Rodrigues	PTS	12	21 Dec 1986	São Paulo, Brazil	WBC Continental Americas Heavyweight Title.
Loss	12-0	(Italy) Francesco Damiani	PTS	10	19 Sep 1986	Lerici, Italy	
Win	17-5-2	(United States) Leon Spinks	TKO	6	2 Aug 1986	(United States) Detroit Lakes, Minnesota, U.S.	Referee stopped the bout at 1:43 of the sixth round.
Win	4-2	(United States) Inoke Katoa	PTS	10	4 Jul 1986	(United States) Gardnerville, Nevada, U.S.	
Loss	31-16-2	(United States) Jimmy Young	MD	10	12 Mar 1986	(United States) Bloomington, Minnesota, U.S.	
Loss	30-16-2	(United States) Jimmy Young	UD	10	20 Jan 1986	(United States) Marshall, Minnesota, U.S.	
Loss	16-1-1	(Argentina) Walter Daniel Falconi	PTS	10	9 Nov 1985	Buenos Aires, Argentina	
Loss	11-1	(South Africa) Pierre Coetzer	PTS	10	13 May 1985	Johannesburg, South Africa	
Win	10-11-1	(United States) Al Houck	PTS	10	30 May 1984	(United States) Mounds View, Minnesota, U.S.	
Win	18-11	(United States) Ken Arlt	SD	10	12 Apr 1984	(United States) Portland, Oregon, U.S.	
Win	10-27-1	(United States) Ernie Smith	KO	7	3 Jul 1983	(United States) Gardnerville, Nevada, U.S.	
Loss	41-5-2	(United States) Marvin Camel	KO	9	21 May 1983	(United States) Billings, Montana, U.S.	IBF USBA Cruiserweight Title.
Win	4-1	(United States) Ralph Rivas	TKO	7	28 Feb 1983	Edmonton, Alberta, Canada	
Win	18-2	(United States) Marty Capasso	PTS	10	14 Dec 1982	(United States) Atlantic City, New Jersey, U.S.	
Win	14-4	(United States) Broderick Mason	MD	8	7 Sep 1982	(United States) Atlantic City, New Jersey, U.S.	
Win	18-9-1	(Mexico) Lupe Guerra	TKO	4	14 Jul 1982	(United States) Saint Paul, Minnesota, U.S.	
Win	0-11	(United States) James Anthony	KO	2	16 Apr 1982	(United States) Amery, Wisconsin, U.S.	
Win	--	Jimmy Lee Jackson	KO	2	25 Feb 1982	(United States) Sioux Falls, South Dakota, U.S.	
Win	0-2	(United States) Akbar Abdullah	PTS	6	20 Jan 1982	(United States) Mounds View, Minnesota, U.S.	
Win	2-1	(United States) Al Houck	PTS	6	30 Sep 1981	(United States) Mounds View, Minnesota, U.S.	
Win	0-2	(United States) Leroy James	KO	1	30 Jul 1981	(United States) Gillette, Minnesota, U.S.	
Win	1-0	(United States) Solomon Dollison	PTS	6	29 Jul 1981	(United States) Mounds View, Minnesota, U.S.	
Win	5-16-1	(United States) Jim Hearn	KO	3	6 Jun 1981	(United States) Amery, Wisconsin, U.S.	Hearn knocked out at 1:48 of the third round.
Win	--	Ingram Butler	KO	1	24 Apr 1981	(United States) Billings, Montana, U.S.	
Win	5-1	(United States) Rick Kellar	PTS	4	21 Jan 1981	(United States) Saint Paul, Minnesota, U.S.	
