= Joey Curtis =

American boxer

George Curtis (April 9, 1925 – May 13, 2004) was a professional boxer, referee and business owner who was licensed to officiate bouts in Las Vegas, Nevada.

Curtis, who had an undistinguished career as a boxer, lived in Las Vegas for thirty years. There, he established the Curtis Construction Company, which he owned until May 2003.

As a boxing referee, Curtis was known for taking boxer's safety into consideration first. He refereed a number of world title fights, and he worked a number of non-title fights over the years.

Curtis is best remembered, however, for two specific fights: On June 26, 1981, at Las Vegas, Lupe Pintor was defending his WBC world Bantamweight championship against Jovito Rengifo, who was attempting to become Peru's first world boxing champion. Rengifo was leading on all scorecards going into the seventh round, but he absorbed dangerous punches during the course of that round. Curtis stopped the fight, giving Pintor a seventh round technical knockout win. The fight's crowd, which in Las Vegas is filled usually with pro-Mexican fans, booed Curtis for his decision to stop the fight.

On December 10, 1982, he was chosen to referee the WBA world Heavyweight championship bout between champion Mike Weaver and challenger Michael Dokes. Dokes had Weaver against the ropes and was landing a combination when Curtis stepped in and stopped the fight. Weaver had already suffered a knockdown about twenty seconds before, but many fans and critics felt that Curtis acted too quickly by stopping the bout after only 63 seconds of fighting. Neither a standing eight count nor a three knockdown rule was in effect.

The WBA investigated the fight, and during the investigation, it was revealed that Curtis had been told by the Nevada Athletic Commission to be mindful of the condition of the fighters after the November 18 death of Duk Koo Kim as the result of a fight with Ray Mancini in Las Vegas on November 13. Fearful of another tragedy, Curtis stopped the fight to prevent Weaver from further punishment. On May 20, 1983, Dokes and Weaver held a rematch, with Dokes retaining the title with a fifteen-round draw.

In his testimony at a Senate hearing in 1993 on organized crime’s involvement in professional boxing, Gambino crime family underboss Sammy Gravano stated that Curtis offered to improve a boxer’s WBC ranking in exchange for $10,000.

In June 2003, Curtis sold his company to a contractor whose license was revoked a month earlier for signing contracts and not finishing work, which resulted in complaints with the state board. Joey Curtis died after a sudden illness at Saint Rose Hospital in Las Vegas.
