= Michael Dokes =

American boxer (1958–2012)

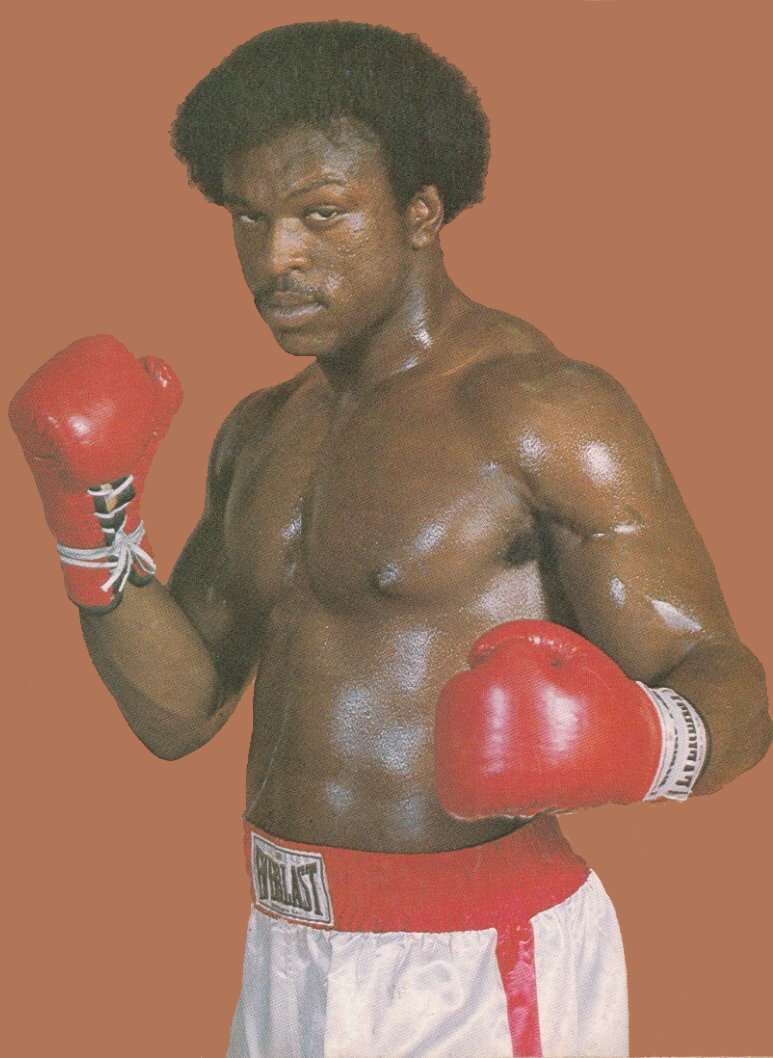
- Dokes c. 1982

Personal information
- Nickname: Dynamite
- Nationality: American
- Born: Michael Marshall Dokes; August 10, 1958 Akron, Ohio, U.S.
- Died: August 11, 2012 (aged 54) Akron, Ohio, U.S.
- Height: 6 ft 3 in (191 cm)
- Weight: Heavyweight

Boxing career
- Reach: 78 in (198 cm)
- Stance: Orthodox

Boxing record
- Total fights: 61
- Wins: 53
- Win by KO: 33
- Losses: 6
- Draws: 2
Medal record
Men's amateur boxing
Representing United States
Pan American Games
Silver medal – second place	Mexico City 1975	Heavyweight

Michael Marshall Dokes (August 10, 1958 – August 11, 2012) was an American professional boxer who competed from 1976 to 1997, and held the WBA heavyweight title from 1982 to 1983. As an amateur he won a silver medal in the heavyweight division at the 1975 Pan American Games.

== Amateur career ==
Dokes won a silver medal at the 1975 Pan American Games. He lost a 5–0 decision to Teófilo Stevenson in the finals. He also lost a close decision to John Tate in the Olympic trials in 1976, after which he turned professional.

=== Amateur accomplishments ===
- 1975 National AAU Heavyweight Champion
- 1976 National Golden Gloves Heavyweight Champion, beating future pro champs John Tate and Greg Page en route.
- As an underage 15-year-old, made it to the finals of both the 1974 National Golden Gloves and the National AAU tournaments. He lost to Leon Spinks in AAU final, and future Mike Tyson trainer Bobby Stewart in the Golden Gloves final.
- Won 1974 North American championships.
- Beat Marvin Stinson, who won the 1976 National AAU Heavyweight Championship.

== Professional career ==
Dokes turned professional in 1976. He received national exposure in a televised exhibition with Muhammad Ali in 1977, which saw Ali clown and mug while slipping Dokes's punches, but also revealed glimpses of Dokes's potential. He came to real prominence in 1979 by defeating veteran contender Jimmy Young. His career faltered slightly after fighting to a draw with Ossie Ocasio, but Dokes returned to knock out Ocasio in one round soon thereafter. By early 1982, after a first-round knockout of Lynn Ball to win the NABF title, Dokes was in line for a title shot. He was ranked #2 by the WBC and #3 by the WBA. Dokes became WBA heavyweight champion in 1982 by knocking out Mike Weaver in the first round in a match held four weeks after the Ray Mancini-Duk Koo Kim lightweight title fight that ended in Kim's death. Because of Nevada State Athletic Commission instructions to referee Joey Curtis regarding the stoppage of the fight in light of the incident, some felt it was premature. In the rematch, Dokes retained his title on a majority draw (tie).

Dokes's reign as the WBA title holder was short-lived. He lost his title by a tenth-round knockout to Gerrie Coetzee. He was later knocked out by future champion Evander Holyfield.

Dokes was knocked out by Donovan Ruddock in 1990. In 1993, Dokes faced newly crowned heavyweight champion Riddick Bowe in his first title defense since defeating Evander Holyfield. Bowe won by TKO in the first round. Although Dokes and his team protested that the fight was stopped prematurely, it was obvious that Dokes was in no condition to continue after taking a vicious barrage of punches from the heavy-hitting Bowe. After a nearly three-year hiatus, Dokes returned to the ring winning three of five matches over a two-year period before retiring for good in 1997.

== Life after boxing ==
In 1999 Dokes was sentenced to between four and 15 years in prison after being convicted of an attack on his fiancée in August 1998. Late in 2008, Dokes was released on parole. Dokes died of liver cancer at a hospice in Akron on 11 August 2012, aged 54.

== Professional boxing record ==
61 fights	53 wins	6 losses
By knockout	34	5
By decision	19	1
Draws	2	

No.	Result	Record	Opponent	Type	Round, time	Date	Location	Notes
61	Loss	53–6–2	Paul Phillips	TKO	2 (10)	Oct 11, 1997	Peels Palace, Erlanger, Kentucky, U.S.	
60	Loss	53–5–2	Louis Monaco	PTS	10	Apr 5, 1997	Aztlan Theatre, Denver, Colorado, U.S.	
59	Win	53–4–2	Doug Davis	PTS	10	Dec 10, 1996	Tempe, Arizona, U.S.	
58	Win	52–4–2	Dave Fiddler	KO	2 (10)	Jul 27, 1996	Lucky Eagle Casino, Rochester, Washington, U.S.	
57	Win	51–4–2	Dave Slaughter	KO	3	Nov 18, 1995	Aurora, Colorado, U.S.	
56	Loss	50–4–2	Riddick Bowe	TKO	1 (12), 2:19	Feb 6, 1993	Madison Square Garden, New York City, New York, U.S.	For WBA and IBF heavyweight titles
55	Win	50–3–2	Barry Forbes	UD	10	Oct 27, 1992	Phoenix, Arizona, U.S.	
54	Win	49–3–2	Jose Ribalta	UD	10	Oct 6, 1992	Mahi Shrine Temple, Miami Beach, Florida, U.S.	
53	Win	48–3–2	Jesse Ferguson	UD	10	Jul 28, 1992	Broadway by the Bay Theater, Atlantic City, New Jersey, U.S.	
52	Win	47–3–2	Danny Sutton	KO	3 (10), 2:54	Apr 16, 1992	Paramount Theatre, New York City, New York, U.S.	
51	Win	46–3–2	Percell Davis	RTD	5 (10), 3:00	Mar 21, 1992	CSU Convocation Center, Cleveland, Ohio, U.S.	
50	Win	45–3–2	Danny Wofford	TKO	9 (10), 2:10	Feb 14, 1992	The Aladdin, Paradise, Nevada, U.S.	
49	Win	44–3–2	Danny Stonewalker	TKO	6 (10), 2:39	Jan 21, 1992	Union Plaza Hotel and Casino, Las Vegas, Nevada, U.S.	
48	Win	43–3–2	Tyrone Armstrong	KO	4 (10), 1:32	Dec 27, 1991	Union Plaza Hotel and Casino, Las Vegas, Nevada, U.S.	
47	Win	42–3–2	John Morton	PTS	8	Nov 29, 1991	The Mirage, Paradise, Nevada, U.S.	
46	Loss	41–3–2	Donovan Ruddock	KO	4 (12), 0:53	Apr 4, 1990	Madison Square Garden, New York City, New York, U.S.	Lost WBA Inter-Continental heavyweight title
45	Win	41–2–2	Jorge Alfredo Dascola	TKO	11 (12), 1:05	Feb 5, 1990	Great Western Forum, Inglewood, California, U.S.	Retained WBA Inter-Continental heavyweight title
44	Win	40–2–2	Lionel Washington	TKO	8 (12), 0:49	Nov 13, 1989	Great Western Forum, Inglewood, California, U.S.	Won vacant WBA Inter-Continental heavyweight title
43	Win	39–2–2	Wesley Watson	TKO	3 (10), 2:25	Aug 24, 1989	Felt Forum, New York City, New York, U.S.	
42	Win	38–2–2	Bobby Crabtree	KO	1 (10), 1:46	Jul 13, 1989	Felt Forum, New York City, New York, U.S.	
41	Loss	37–2–2	Evander Holyfield	TKO	10 (12), 1:41	Mar 11, 1989	Caesars Palace, Paradise, Nevada, U.S.	Lost WBC Continental Americas heavyweight title
40	Win	37–1–2	Rocky Sekorski	UD	12	Dec 9, 1988	Convention Hall, Atlantic City, New Jersey, U.S.	Retained WBC Continental Americas heavyweight title
39	Win	36–1–2	Curtis Isaac	TKO	4 (10), 2:21	Oct 27, 1988	Felt Forum, New York City, New York, U.S.	
38	Win	35–1–2	Manoel De Almeida	RTD	4 (10), 3:00	Jul 28, 1988	Felt Forum, New York City, New York, U.S.	
37	Win	34–1–2	Andrew Stokes	TKO	1 (10), 2:58	Jun 27, 1988	Madison Square Garden, New York City, New York, U.S.	
36	Win	33–1–2	James Pritchard	TKO	7 (12), 2:32	Apr 28, 1988	Felt Forum, New York City, New York, U.S.	Won vacant WBC Continental Americas heavyweight title
35	Win	32–1–2	Eddie Richardson	TKO	10 (10), 2:15	Feb 24, 1988	Felt Forum, New York City, New York, U.S.	
34	Win	31–1–2	Ken Lakusta	TKO	7 (10), 2:52	Jan 22, 1988	Convention Hall, Atlantic City, New Jersey, U.S.	
33	Win	30–1–2	Kevin Porter	TKO	5 (10), 0:25	Dec 17, 1987	Felt Forum, New York City, New York, U.S.	
32	Win	29–1–2	Randall Cobb	TD	4 (12), 1:03	Mar 15, 1985	Riviera, Winchester, Nevada, U.S.	Won vacant WBC Continental Americas heavyweight title; Majority TD after Dokes was cut from an accidental head clash
31	Win	28–1–2	Young Louis	TKO	2 (10), 2:29	Feb 16, 1985	Andy Murphy Midtown Neighborhood Center, Kingston, New York, U.S.	
30	Win	27–1–2	Mike Jameson	UD	10	Aug 31, 1984	Riviera, Winchester, Nevada, U.S.	
29	Loss	26–1–2	Gerrie Coetzee	KO	10 (15), 3:08	Sep 23, 1983	Coliseum, Richfield, Ohio, U.S.	Lost WBA heavyweight title
28	Draw	26–0–2	Mike Weaver	MD	15	May 20, 1983	Dunes, Paradise, Nevada, U.S.	Retained WBA heavyweight title
27	Win	26–0–1	Mike Weaver	TKO	1 (15), 1:03	Dec 10, 1982	Caesars Palace, Paradise, Nevada, U.S.	Won WBA heavyweight title
26	Win	25–0–1	Tommy Franco Thomas	KO	5 (12), 1:33	Mar 20, 1982	Playboy Hotel and Casino, Atlantic City, New Jersey, U.S.	Retained NABF heavyweight title
25	Win	24–0–1	Lynn Ball	TKO	1 (12), 2:56	Jan 30, 1982	Caesars Palace, Paradise, Nevada, U.S.	Won NABF heavyweight title
24	Win	23–0–1	George Chaplin	UD	10	Nov 6, 1981	Civic Arena, Pittsburgh, Pennsylvania, U.S.	
23	Win	22–0–1	Harry Terrell	KO	1 (10), 1:25	Aug 9, 1981	Public Hall, Cleveland, Ohio, U.S.	
22	Win	21–0–1	John L. Gardner	KO	4 (10), 1:54	Jun 12, 1981	Joe Louis Arena, Detroit, Michigan, U.S.	
21	Win	20–0–1	Randall Cobb	MD	10	Mar 22, 1981	Caesars Palace, Paradise, Nevada, U.S.	
20	Win	19–0–1	Tom Fischer	TKO	7 (10), 1:17	Oct 2, 1980	Caesars Palace, Paradise, Nevada, U.S.	
19	Win	18–0–1	Ossie Ocasio	TKO	1 (10), 2:33	Jun 27, 1980	San Juan, Puerto Rico	
18	Draw	17–0–1	Ossie Ocasio	SD	10	Apr 19, 1980	San Juan, Puerto Rico	
17	Win	17–0	Lucien Rodriguez	UD	10	Feb 10, 1980	Convention Center, Miami Beach, Florida, U.S.	
16	Win	16–0	Earl Tripp	KO	1 (10), 2:59	Jan 13, 1980	Caesars Palace, Paradise, Nevada, U.S.	
15	Win	15–0	Jimmy Young	UD	10	Sep 28, 1979	Caesars Palace, Paradise, Nevada, U.S.	
14	Win	14–0	Willie McIntyre	KO	2 (10), 2:56	Jul 20, 1979	Auditorium, West Palm Beach, Florida, U.S.	
13	Win	13–0	Greg Sorrentino	KO	3 (10)	May 12, 1979	Caesars Palace, Paradise, Nevada, U.S.	
12	Win	12–0	Wendell Bailey	SD	10	Mar 23, 1979	Las Vegas Hilton, Winchester, Nevada, U.S.	
11	Win	11–0	Ira Martin	TKO	8 (8), 1:51	Dec 8, 1978	Madison Square Garden, New York City, New York, U.S.	
10	Win	10–0	Eugene Green	UD	8	Oct 27, 1978	Madison Square Garden, New York City, New York, U.S.	
9	Win	9–0	Terry Mims	UD	8	Sep 26, 1978	Convention Center, Miami Beach, Florida, U.S.	
8	Win	8–0	Dan Johnson	UD	6	Apr 29, 1978	The Forum, Inglewood, California, U.S.	
7	Win	7–0	Abdul Khan	UD	8	Mar 25, 1978	Caesars Palace, Paradise, Nevada, U.S.	
6	Win	6–0	George Holden	KO	2 (8)	Mar 3, 1978	Rif Stadion, Willemstad, Netherlands Antilles	
5	Win	5–0	Ed Turner	PTS	6	Apr 10, 1977	Fontainbleau, Miami Beach, Florida, U.S.	
4	Win	4–0	Charlie Jordan	TKO	3 (4)	Mar 6, 1977	Correctional Facility, Marion, Ohio, U.S.	
3	Win	3–0	Dave Wilson	PTS	4	Jan 29, 1977	Fontainebleau, Miami Beach, Florida, U.S.	
2	Win	2–0	Sergio Rodriguez	TKO	2	Jan 16, 1977	USS Lexington (CV-16), Pensacola, Florida, U.S.	
1	Win	1–0	Al Byrd	RTD	2 (4), 3:00	Oct 15, 1976	Hollywood Sportatorium, Pembroke Pines, Florida, U.S.	

== Exhibition boxing record ==
1 fight	0 wins	0 losses
Non-scored	1	

No.	Result	Record	Opponent	Type	Round, time	Date	Location	Notes
1	—N/a	0–0 (1)	(United States) Muhammad Ali	—N/a	3	Apr 16, 1977	(United States) Miami Beach Convention Center, Miami Beach, Florida, U.S.	Non-scored bout

Sporting positions
Amateur boxing titles
Previous: Dwain Bonds	U.S. heavyweight champion 1975	Next: Marvin Stinson
Previous: Emory Chapman	U.S. Golden Gloves heavyweight champion 1976	Next: James Clark
Regional boxing titles
Preceded by Lynn Ball	NABF heavyweight champion January 30, 1982 – December 1982; Vacated	Vacant Title next held by Tim Witherspoon
Vacant Title last held by Bernardo Mercado	WBC Continental Americas heavyweight champion March 15, 1985 – December 1985; Vacated	Vacant Title next held by Leon Spinks
Vacant Title last held by Leon Spinks	WBC Continental Americas heavyweight champion April 28, 1988 – March 11, 1989	Succeeded by Evander Holyfield
New title	WBA Inter-Continental heavyweight champion November 13, 1989 – April 4, 1990	Succeeded by Donovan Ruddock
World boxing titles
Preceded by Mike Weaver	WBA heavyweight champion December 10, 1982 – September 23, 1983	Succeeded by Gerrie Coetzee
Awards
Previous: Frankie Duarte	The Ring Comeback of the Year; 1988	Next: Roberto Durán
