= Herbie Hide vs. Vitali Klitschko =

Boxing event

For Queen & Country
- Date: 26 June 1999
- Venue: London Arena, Tower Hamlets, London, UK
- Title(s) on the line: WBO Heavyweight Championship

Tale of the tape
Boxer	(United Kingdom) Herbie Hide	(Ukraine) Vitali Klitschko
Nickname	"The Dancing Destroyer"	"Dr. Ironfist"
Hometown	Norwich, Norfolk, UK	Kyiv, Ukraine
Pre-fight record	31–1 (30 KO)	25–0 (25 KO)
Age	27 years, 9 months	27 years, 11 months
Height	6 ft 2 in (188 cm)	6 ft 7 in (201 cm)
Weight	221 lb (100 kg)	246 lb (112 kg)
Style	Orthodox	Orthodox
Recognition	WBO; Heavyweight Champion	WBO; No. 1 Ranked Heavyweight

Result
- Klitschko defeated Hide via 2nd Round KO

Herbie Hide vs. Vitali Klitschko, billed as For Queen & Country, was a professional boxing match contested on 26 June 1999, for the WBO Heavyweight Championship.

== Background ==
After stopping Tony Tucker in two round, in June 1997 to regain the WBO heavyweight belt, Herbie Hide had made two quick defences against Damon Reed and Wilhelm Fischer. He had criticized the bout between Lennox Lewis and Evander Holyfield being described as for undisputed championship saying to the BBC, "How can Lewis against Holyfield be for the undisputed title when my belt is not involved?", this despite the WBO being considered to be a fringe title by most in boxing, with last of the major sanctioning bodies (the IBF) recognizing them in 2007.

He had a bout with former WBA cruiserweight champion Orlin Norris scraped three times, with a Norris knee injury preventing a late 1998 date, a 13 February event was postponed on five day's notice following a skin allergy issue for Hide and finally a 3 April bout at the Royal Albert Hall was cancelled after Hide suffered an Achilles tendon injury on a training run.

After recovering he agreed to face his mandatory contentor, unbeaten European champion Vitali Klitschko, while Norris would face Pele Reid on the undercard. On fight night Hide was a 2/5 favourite to win with the bookmakers.

== The fight ==
After a close first round, Klitschko knocked down Hide early in the second round. He beat the count but was floored again with another right shortly afterwards. He rose on the count of 8 but the referee waved it off, giving Klitschko a second-round KO.

== Aftermath ==
Klitschko would make two defences of the title before injury forced him to withdraw against late replacement Chris Byrd in April 2000. Hide would spend the next two years out of the ring before making a comeback, but his career would never reach the same heights.

== Undercard ==
Confirmed bouts:

== Broadcasting ==
Country	Broadcaster
United Kingdom	Sky Sports

Preceded by vs. Wilhelm Fischer	Herbie Hide's bouts 26 June 1999	Succeeded by vs. Alexey Osokin
Preceded by vs. Ismael Youla	Vitali Klitschko's bouts 26 June 1999	Succeeded by vs. Ed Mahone
