= Vitali Klitschko =

Ukrainian politician and boxer (born 1971)

Hero of Ukraine Vitali Klitschko OS
- Віталій Кличко
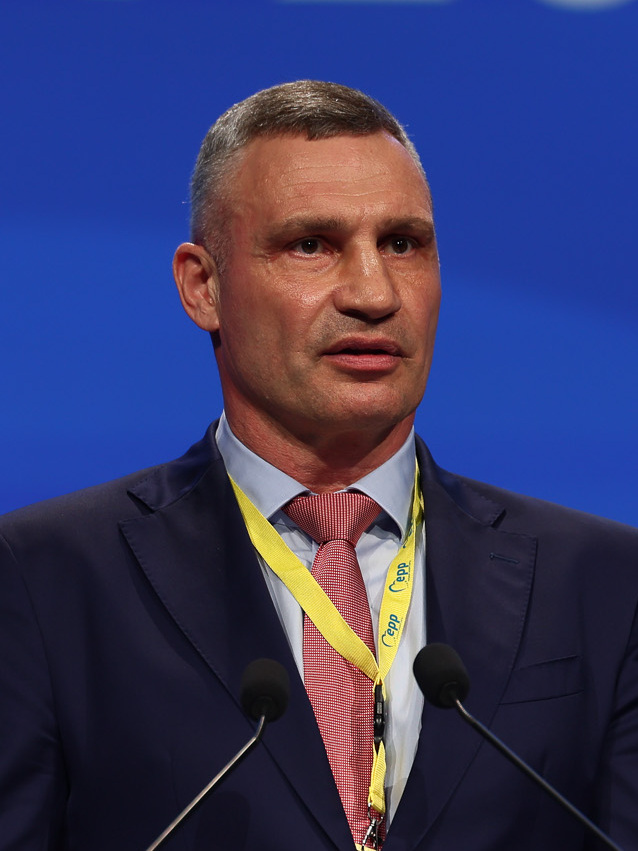
- Klitschko in 2025

Mayor of Kyiv
- Incumbent
- Assumed office 5 June 2014
- Preceded by: Halyna Hereha (acting)

Head of the Kyiv City State Administration
- In office 25 June 2014 – 1 March 2022
- Preceded by: Volodymyr Bondarenko
- Succeeded by: Mykola Zhyrnov (head of military administration)

Deputy of the Kyiv City Council

5th session
- In office April 2006 – June 2008
- Constituency: Klitschko Bloc "PORA–ROP"

6th session
- In office June 2008 – December 2012
- Constituency: Vitali Klitschko Bloc

People's Deputy of Ukraine

7th convocation
- In office 12 December 2012 – 5 June 2014
- Constituency: UDAR, No.1

Personal details
- Born: 19 July 1971 (age 55) Belovodskoye, Kirghiz SSR, Soviet Union
- Citizenship: Soviet Union (until 1991); Ukraine (from 1991)
- Party: Ukrainian Democratic; Alliance for Reform
- Other political affiliations: Petro Poroshenko Bloc "Solidarity" (2015–2016)
- Spouse: Natalija Jehorova (m. 1996; sep. 2022)
- Children: 3
- Relatives: Wladimir Klitschko (brother)
- Education: Pereiaslav-Khmelnytsky Pedagogical Institute; Taras Shevchenko National University; National University of Physical Education and Sport of Ukraine; National Academy for Public Administration
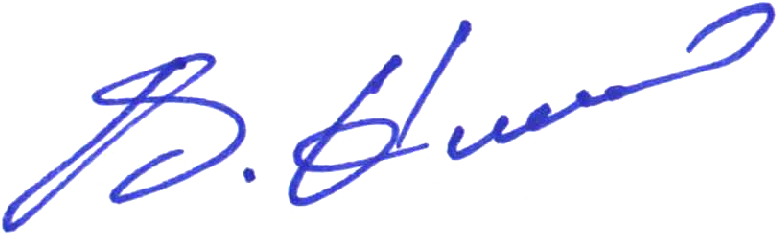
- Signature
- Website: klitschko.com
- Scientific career
- Thesis: Методика визначення якостей боксерів у системі багатоетапного спортивного відбору (2000)
- Military career
- Allegiance: Soviet Union; Ukraine
- Branch: Soviet Army; Ukrainian Ground Forces
- Service years: 1989–1991, 2022–present
- Rank: Major
- Conflicts: Battle of Kyiv (2022)
- Boxing career
- Nickname: Dr. Ironfist
- Height: 2.01 m (6 ft 7 in)
- Weight: Heavyweight
- Reach: 203 cm (80 in)
- Stance: Orthodox

Boxing record
- Total fights: 47
- Wins: 45
- Win by KO: 41
- Losses: 2
Medal record
Men's amateur boxing
Representing Ukraine
Military World Games
Gold medal – first place	1995 Rome	Super-heavyweight
World Championships
Silver medal – second place	1995 Berlin	Super-heavyweight

Vitalii Volodymyrovych Klychko (/vɪˌtæli ˈklɪtʃkoʊ/; Ukrainian: Віталій Володимирович Кличко [wiˈtɑl⁽ʲ⁾ij woloˈdɪmɪrowɪtʃ klɪtʃˈkɔ]; born 19 July 1971), known as Vitali Klitschko, (Note: /ˈklɪtʃkoʊ/, note that this name is a German transliteration of Russian: Виталий Кличко, romanized: Vitaly Klichko) is a Ukrainian politician and former professional boxer who has served as the mayor of Kyiv since 2014. He previously served as the head of the Kyiv City State Administration until the start of the Russian invasion of Ukraine in 2022.

As a professional boxer, Klitschko won multiple world heavyweight championships. He held the World Boxing Organization (WBO) world title from 1999 to 2000, the Ring magazine title from 2004 to 2005, and the World Boxing Council (WBC) world title twice between 2004 and 2013. Overall, he defeated 15 opponents in world heavyweight title fights, and made 12 successful title defences. In 2011, Vitali and his younger brother Wladimir Klitschko entered the Guinness World Records as brothers with most world heavyweight title fight wins (30 at the time; 40 as of 2020). From 2006 until 2015, Vitali and Wladimir (also a multiple world champion) dominated heavyweight boxing, a period widely known as the "Klitschko Era" of the division. Klitschko's last fight was in 2012, but he remained the WBC heavyweight champion at age 42 when he announced his retirement in December 2013. Though both of his losses were by stoppage—specifically by corner retirement—Klitschko is only the third heavyweight champion to have finished his boxing career without being knocked down, after Nikolai Valuev and Oliver McCall, and he is thus known for having one of the toughest chins in boxing history.

Klitschko formally began his political career in 2006 when he placed second in the Kyiv mayoral race. In 2010, he founded the party Ukrainian Democratic Alliance for Reform (UDAR) and was elected for this party the 2012 Ukrainian parliamentary election. He was a leading figure in the 2013–2014 Euromaidan protests, and he announced his possible candidacy for the Ukrainian presidency, but later withdrew and endorsed the eventual winner Petro Poroshenko. He was elected Mayor of Kyiv on 25 May 2014. He headed the election list of the winner of the 2014 Ukrainian parliamentary election, the Petro Poroshenko Bloc, but gave up his parliamentary seat to stay on as mayor of Kyiv. On 28 August 2015, the UDAR party merged into Petro Poroshenko Bloc, and Klitschko became the new party leader. Klitschko was reelected as mayor on 15 November 2015. Klitschko revived UDAR, and left Petro Poroshenko Bloc with it, in May 2019 and simultaneously announced that UDAR would take part in the 2019 Ukrainian parliamentary election autonomously. UDAR failed to win any seats.

Klitschko was re-elected to a second term as mayor in the 2020 Kyiv local elections, securing 50.52% of the votes in the first round of voting and thus avoiding a run-off. Following the Russian invasion of Ukraine, Klitschko has become an international symbol of Ukrainian resistance.

== Kickboxing and amateur boxing career ==
Klitschko took up boxing, being trained by former Soviet boxer, 1974 World Championships bronze medalist Anatoliy Klimanov, a head boxing coach of the CSKA Kyiv Sports Club. Soviets assembled their kickboxing team, Klitschko was a member. He was competing in amateur boxing, kickboxing, and sport karate simultaneously, showing considerable success in all combat sports in which he was involved.

(bronze) X Summer Spartakiad of Peoples of the USSR, boxing (+91 kg), Minsk, Belarus SSR, July 1991:

- 1/2: Lost to Oleg Maskaev (Uzbek SSR) RSC 2

(silver) WAKO European Kickboxing Championships, light contact division (+89 kg), Varna, Bulgaria, November 1992:

- Finals: Lost to Pelé Reid (England) KO (at 2:55 by a spin kick to the jaw)

(gold) ISKA World Super Heavyweight Championships, 1994:

- Finals: Defeated Richard Vince (United Kingdom) KO 2

(bronze) XVI President's Boxing Cup (+91 kg) Jakarta, Indonesia, February 1994:

- 1/2: Lost to Christophe Mendy (France) PTS

VII Boxing World Cup (+91 kg), Bangkok, Thailand, June 1994:

- 1/8: Defeated Ahn Jung-hyun (South Korea) RSCH 5
- 1/4: Lost to Svilen Rusinov (Bulgaria) 9–10 (5 rds)

(silver) XLI World Military Boxing Championships (+91 kg), Tunis, Tunisia, 1994:

- Finals: Lost to Alexei Lezin (Russia) 1–10

(gold) XXIII Chemistry Cup (+91 kg), Halle, Germany, March 1995:

- 1/4: Defeated Willi Fischer (Germany) 10–0
- 1/2: Defeated René Monse (Germany) 9–3
- Finals: Defeated Georgi Kandelaki (Georgia) by walkover

(silver) World Championships (+91 kg), Berlin, Germany, May 1995:

- 1/16: Defeated Igor Kshinin (Russia) RSC 1
- 1/8: Defeated Gytis Juškevičius (Lithuania) RSC 2
- 1/4: Defeated Attila Levin (Sweden) RET 2
- 1/2: Defeated René Monse (Germany) 6–5
- Finals: Lost to Alexei Lezin (Russia) 3–12

(gold) Military World Games (+91 kg), Ariccia, Italy, September 1995:

- 1/8: Defeated Drago Mijić (Croatia) by walkover
- 1/4: Defeated Kenneth Horsley (United States) RET 1
- 1/2: Defeated Svilen Rusinov (Bulgaria) RSC 1
- Finals: Defeated Alexei Lezin (Russia) 9–4

(silver) WAKO European Kickboxing Championships, light contact division (+89 kg), Kyiv, Ukraine, November 1995:

- Finals: Lost to William van Roosmalen (Netherlands) KO (by a high kick)

Amateur boxing record: 195 wins (80 knockouts), 15 losses (0 knockouts).

Kickboxing record: 34 wins (22 knockouts), 2 losses (2 knockouts).

He was a kickboxing world champion six times (winning amateur world championships twice and professional championship tournaments four times). In 1996, he finished his amateur boxing career and turned professional, signing with the German-based Universum Box-Promotion (UBP.)

== Professional boxing career ==
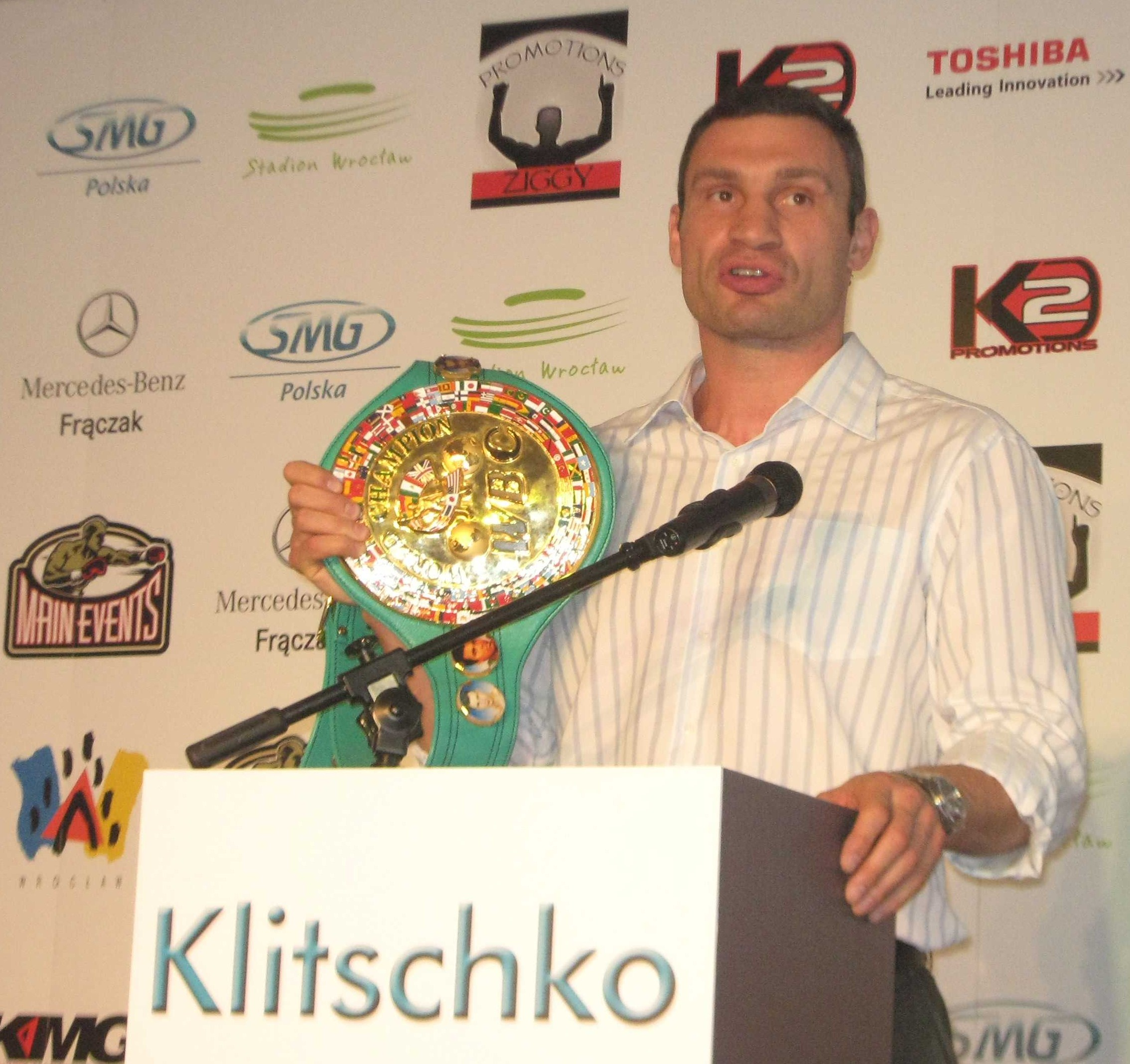
Klitschko with the WBC title in 2011

As an amateur, Klitschko won the super-heavyweight championship at the first World Military Games in Italy in 1995. In the same year he won a silver medal at the World Championships in Berlin, Germany, where he was defeated by Russia's Alexei Lezin in the final. In his autobiography, published in Germany in 2004, the boxer revealed that he tested positive for a banned steroid in 1996. He attributed the presence of the drug to treatment of a leg injury, but was dismissed from the Ukrainian boxing team and missed the Atlanta Olympics. His brother Wladimir moved up from heavyweight to super heavyweight to take his place in the squad and won the Olympic gold medal.

=== WBO heavyweight champion ===
Klitschko began his professional boxing career in 1996, winning his first twenty-four fights by either early knockout or technical knockout. He and Wladimir signed with the German athlete-promotion company Universum. With both brothers holding PhDs and being multilingual, their refined and articulate personalities made for mainstream marketability when they moved to Germany and Universum. In time, they became national celebrities in their adopted home country. In his 25th pro fight on 26 June 1999, Klitschko won the WBO heavyweight title from Herbie Hide of the United Kingdom by a second-round knockout. He successfully defended the title twice. He defeated Ed Mahone by knockout in the third round and beat Obed Sullivan, who retired after the ninth round.

=== Title loss to Byrd ===
By April 2000 Klitschko was unbeaten and a rising star in the heavyweight division, having won all 27 of his contests by knockout. On 1 April, Klitschko had a third title defense against the American Chris Byrd, who was a late replacement. Byrd made himself a difficult target and tried to thwart Klitschko's offense by being elusive. After the ninth round, Klitschko notified his corner that he had a shoulder pain and threw in the towel, thus handing Klitschko his first defeat and awarding Byrd the win by RTD. At the time of the stoppage, Klitschko had won 8 of 9 rounds on one judge's scorecard, and 7 of 9 on the two others. Klitschko, who was later diagnosed with a torn rotator cuff, received much criticism for quitting the fight. Klitschko rebounded from his loss to Byrd by reeling off five victories in a row, earning himself a shot at WBC heavyweight champion Lennox Lewis.

=== Klitschko vs. Lewis ===
The fight between Lewis and Klitschko was to take place in December 2003, and Klitschko signed for a tune-up fight on 21 June 2003 as part of the undercard of Lewis's fight with Kirk Johnson for the IBO title, as the WBC would not sanction the fight for their title. Johnson, however, pulled out of the fight due to injury and Klitschko, due to his being in training for a fight on the same day as Lewis, took the fight on short notice. Immediately after he accepted, the WBC elected to sanction the fight as a title match and Lewis's The Ring title was also up for grabs in addition to his lineal title.

Lennox Lewis vs. Vitali Klitschko took place at Staples Center in Los Angeles, California. Klitschko, a 4–1 underdog, dominated the early going with many harder punches. He stunned Lewis in the second round with two hard rights, leaving a cut under Lewis's left eye. In the third, Lewis landed a big right hand that opened a deep cut above Klitschko's left eye. Before the seventh round, the ringside doctor inspected the wound and deemed it severe enough to threaten eye damage if struck again, stopping the fight despite Klitschko's pleas to continue. Klitschko was ahead on all three judges' scorecards 58–56 (4 rounds to 2) at the time of the stoppage, but because the wound was a result of punches from Lewis, Lewis won by corner retirement.

Negotiations for a 6 December rematch began. After negotiations collapsed, Klitschko defeated Kirk Johnson in a WBC eliminator bout on 6 December date, setting up a mandatory rematch with Lewis. In January 2004, the WBC announced that it would strip Lewis of the belt if he let pass a 15 March deadline to sign for a rematch with Klitschko. Shortly thereafter, Lewis announced his retirement and vacated the title. For years after this fight, Klitschko would occasionally call out Lewis for a rematch, despite the latter having retired in early 2004.

Around this time the Klitschko brothers moved from Hamburg, Germany, to Los Angeles. In January 2004 they notified Universum that they would not re-sign when their contracts expired in April. Universum sued the brothers, arguing that their recent injuries had triggered a clause binding them beyond April. The suit was ultimately resolved in favor of the Klitschkos in November 2009.

=== WBC and The Ring heavyweight champion ===
Klitschko faced South African Corrie Sanders on 24 April 2004 for the WBC heavyweight championship and The Ring belts that had been vacated by Lewis. Sanders had stopped younger brother Wladimir in the second round (TKO) on 8 March 2003. Klitschko took a heavy shot in round one by Sanders and was almost knocked down right at the end of the round, but by using upper-body movement and accurate punching he broke down Sanders over the following rounds, forcing referee Jon Schorle to stop the bout in the eighth. Klitschko landed 60% of his power punches.

=== Klitschko vs. Williams ===
Klitschko's first WBC title defense was against British boxer Danny Williams. Williams had become suddenly marketable from a KO over Mike Tyson in round 4. Klitschko scored a technical knockout against Williams in 8 rounds on 11 December 2004, while wearing an orange cloth to show support for the Ukrainian presidential opposition movement. Klitschko knocked Williams down in the 1st, 3rd, 7th, and 8th rounds before the fight was stopped. Immediately afterward, Klitschko dedicated his victory to democracy in his native Ukraine and also to the Ukrainian presidential candidate Viktor Yushchenko, whom he supported on 26 December 2004, election revote.

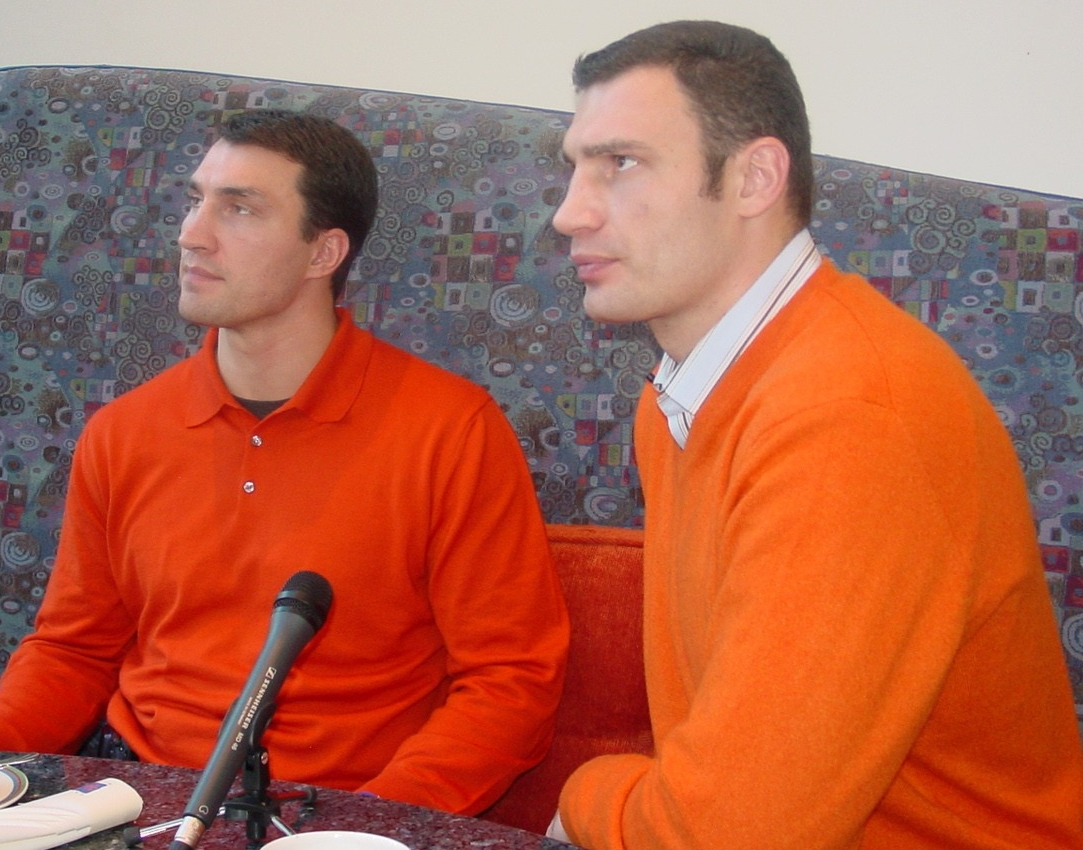
Vitali (right) and his brother Wladimir supporting the Orange Revolution by wearing its colors

=== First retirement (2005–2007) ===
Klitschko was scheduled to make his second defense against former heavyweight champion and current WBC interim champion Hasim Rahman on November 12, 2005, at the Thomas & Mack Center in Las Vegas. However, on November 9, with three days before the fight, Klitschko announced his retirement from professional boxing and vacated his title, ultimately canceling the bout. He had been training to fight Rahman; however, nine days before the fight, he injured his leg while sparring. He snapped his anterior cruciate ligament, which with surgery would take up to a year to heal and possibly prove career ending. To avoid keeping the title out of use, he retired. The WBC was grateful for his consideration. On other occasions, he cited regrets about his suddenly mounting injuries, a desire to leave the sport while still on top and political aspirations in his home country of Ukraine. Following his retirement, the WBC conferred "champion emeritus" status on Klitschko, and assured him he would become the mandatory challenger if and when he decided to return.

=== Second WBC heavyweight championship ===
On 3 August 2008 the WBC awarded Klitschko a chance to regain his WBC heavyweight title. After Vitali's retirement, his younger brother had established dominance in the division, winning two of the four world titles available. The reigning WBC Champion was Samuel Peter (who had lost a decision to Wladimir in 2005). At the time, there was interest in a potential Peter vs. Wladimir unification match. Instead, Vitali took advantage of his champion emeritus status and secured a title challenge against Peter. The fight was arranged on 11 October 2008 at O2 World, Berlin. It would be one of the most anticipated heavyweight fights in the past few years. Both men had a rightful claim to being the champion and the stakes for the future of the heavyweight division were high. Despite some questioning Klitschko's decision to return after almost four years, he managed to regain his title in dominating fashion. Klitschko had Peter intimidated from the first round and stunned him with accurate hard punches. Klitschko kept the hard-punching Nigerian off with an effective left jab and took control in the center of the ring. Over eight rounds, Klitschko completely dismantled and outfought the younger champion. After the eighth round, Peter slumped on his stool, shook his head and asked that the bout be stopped. With the Samuel Peter victory, Klitschko technically became one of the few men to ever hold a version of the world heavyweight title three times—WBO (1999–2000), WBC (2004–2005) and WBC (2008–2013).

=== Klitschko vs. Gómez, Arreola, Johnson ===
On 21 March 2009, Klitschko defeated Juan Carlos Gómez by TKO in the ninth round. Gómez tried to use his movement to thwart Klitschko but seemed unable to cope with the power and physical strength of his opponent. As the rounds progressed, Klitschko began imposing himself on Gómez more and more. Gómez soon became wary of Klitschko's power and also began to tire physically. By the sixth round, Klitschko was in total control. The end came when the referee stopped the fight in the ninth round as Gómez appeared unable to withstand any more hits.

On 26 September, Klitschko earned a one-sided TKO victory over Chris Arreola at the Staples Center in Los Angeles when Arreola's trainer, Henry Ramirez, asked the referee to stop the fight. Arreola was considered at the time one of the division's hardest punchers; however, Klitschko kept Arreola at bay with his left jab and hit him almost at will with his right. Arreola had been influenced by Samuel Peter's defeat to Klitschko in 2008, in which Peter had tried to box from the outside. He therefore employed a game-plan which involved applying constant pressure to Klitschko in order to force him into a high tempo fight. Despite his best efforts, the bout became one-sided very quickly. Klitschko consistently proved himself faster, sharper and much fitter than Arreola.

On 12 December, Klitschko defeated Kevin Johnson by unanimous decision, winning almost every round. Johnson, a skillful fighter, tried to negate Klitschko's strength with angles and head movement. Though he proved hard to hit, he failed to launch any sustained attack of his own. After the Johnson bout, Klitschko's camp began negotiations for a potential fight with former WBA champion Nikolai Valuev, but the match failed to materialize due to economic disagreements.

=== Klitschko vs. Sosnowski, Briggs, Solís ===
On 29 May 2010, Klitschko defeated Polish heavyweight contender Albert Sosnowski by KO at 2:30 in round 10 of 12. Sosnowski was knocked down by a right hand in the 10th round, prompting referee Jay Nady to immediately wave off the fight. The fight took place at Veltins-Arena, Gelsenkirchen, North Rhine-Westphalia, Germany.

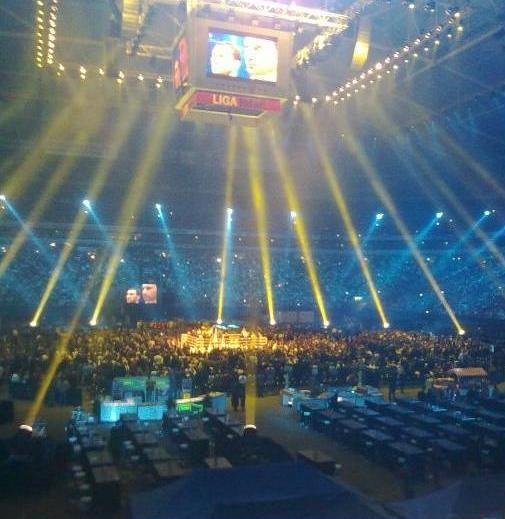
Klitschko vs Sosnowski, 29 May 2010

Klitschko weighed in at 112 kg (247 lb), while Sosnowski weighed in at 110 kg (240 lb). This voluntary defense was Klitschko's fourth defense of the WBC heavyweight title. Sosnowski was the No. 11 ranked heavyweight according to the WBC prior to this bout.

On 17 August 2010, it was announced that Klitschko would defend his WBC title against Shannon Briggs on 16 October of that year. Klitschko completely dismantled his challenger with superior hand speed. Briggs struggled to land any meaningful punches, as Klitschko won every round decisively. After a few rounds, Briggs was receiving a vicious and sustained beating which caused him serious facial injuries. Considering the beating he was receiving, there was some suggestion that the referee should have stopped the bout during the last few rounds. Klitschko had retained his belt with official scores of 120–107, 120–107, and 120–105.

During the post-fight interview, the American boxer Briggs said: "I've fought George Foreman, I've fought Lennox Lewis, and Vitali's the best." While Klitschko did not knock down Briggs, the latter collapsed after the fight and was hospitalized with facial fractures and a torn biceps.

Klitschko's next fight was against mandatory challenger Odlanier Solís. The bout was tentatively scheduled for March 2011. On 11 January, it was officially confirmed that the fight between Klitschko and Solís was going to take place in Cologne, Germany on 19 March 2011. The fight lasted less than one whole round, as a right hand to Solís's temple wobbled Solís, who then twisted his knee. Klitschko won by KO. Klitschko reportedly earned $15 million for the bout.

=== Klitschko vs. Adamek, Chisora, Charr ===
Now aged 40, Klitschko retained his WBC heavyweight title against Tomasz Adamek on 10 September 2011 in Poland, winning by TKO in the 10th round, in the first ever PPV fight in Polish TV history. The referee stopped the bout after Adamek received punishing blows and was ruled out, as he was no longer able to defend himself.

After turning 41 on 19 July 2012, Klitschko became one of the oldest heavyweight champions in history. Despite having a four-year hiatus from the sport, Klitschko had proven to be a remarkably effective and dominant heavyweight champion once again. Alongside his brother Wladimir, he also fights on for their shared ambition of holding all four heavyweight titles together, an ambition that was realised on 2 July 2011 when brother Wladimir defeated David Haye to win the WBA heavyweight title.

In January 2012, he was awarded WBC Fighter of the Year for 2011. Klitschko was in negotiations for a possible bout with former WBA heavyweight title holder David Haye on 3 March 2012.

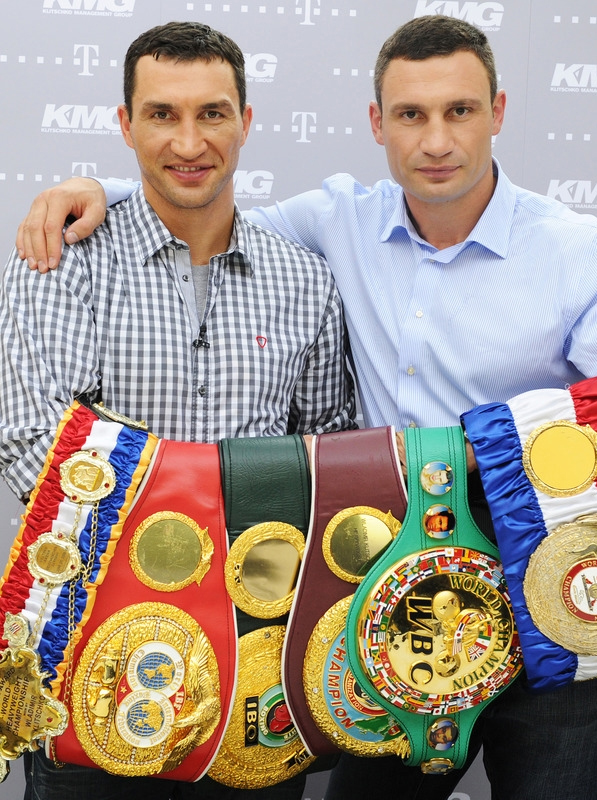
Wladimir and Vitali with every title in the heavyweight division, 2012. Left to right: The Ring, IBF, IBO, WBO, WBC, and WBA.

After Wladimir Klitschko had to cancel his fight with Jean-Marc Mormeck, it was thought that Vitali was likely to fight on 25 February 2012. Sources in Germany reported that he was likely to fight British contender Derek Chisora on 18 February 2012 in Olympiahalle, Munich, Bavaria.

It was confirmed on 12 December 2011 that Derek Chisora would be Klitschko's next opponent. Klitschko retained his WBC title unanimously in a dominant display in Munich. The fight was fought against a backdrop of antagonism displayed by Chisora at the weigh in. Chisora slapped Klitschko across the face causing a red mark to be left. The next day Chisora spat water over the face of Vitali's brother Wladimir.

Vitali won the majority of the rounds boxing a disciplined fight with changing angles and superior footwork. Chisora, constantly coming forward delivering punishing body shots, failed to wear down the older man. The scores were: 118–110, 118–110, and 119–111. The next day Klitschko visited a hospital to check his shoulder, claiming he injured it in the fight. A doctor confirmed a ligament tear was suffered in his left shoulder. Klitschko said he "suddenly lost strength in the left hand" and was forced to only use his right. The injury was believed to have happened in the second or third round. Klitschko's trainer, Fritz Sdunek, believes this is the same kind of injury Klitschko suffered in his fight with Byrd.

At the post-fight press conference, a brawl ensued between Haye and Chisora. After the altercation, Chisora challenged Haye to a fight in the ring and said, "I am going to shoot David Haye." Chisora was later arrested at a German airport along with his coach, Don Charles. His comments and actions were later condemned by Frank Warren, his promoter, and Wladimir Klitschko.

On 2 July 2012, it was announced that Vitali would defend his WBC heavyweight title on 8 September at the Olympic Indoor Arena in Moscow, Russia. His opponent for the fight was undefeated future WBA heavyweight champion Mahmoud Charr 21–0 (11 KOs). Klitschko won the fight via technical knockout when the ringside doctors refused to allow Charr to continue due to a cut received from Klitschko's punches in the fourth round.

Klitschko was expected to face Bermane Stiverne in a mandatory title defense but was forced to pull out due to injury.

=== Retirement from boxing ===
On 15 December 2013, Klitschko stepped back from boxing. He was announced champion emeritus, which means that if he wants to return to boxing, he can fight the WBC heavyweight champion without having any fights beforehand. But (right after his retirement from boxing), Klitschko stated "That is something I currently cannot imagine". The WBC title was vacated and later contested by Chris Arreola and Bermane Stiverne. Commenting on his decision, he stated "My focus is on politics in Ukraine and I feel the people there need me". He also added, "I thank the WBC and its president José Sulaimán for the support in our battle for democracy and freedom in Ukraine". Since his retirement, he has maintained a limited level of training and has been in his brother's corner for most fights, most famously when he had an altercation with Anthony Joshua after Anthony Joshua vs. Wladimir Klitschko.

== Political career ==
=== Early years in politics ===
During the 2004 Ukrainian presidential election and the following Orange Revolution, the Klitschko brothers openly supported the candidacy of Viktor Yushchenko. In 2005, Vitali Klitschko was appointed an adviser to President Yushchenko. In October 2006, he was promoted to full-time adviser.

Klitschko began campaigning for Mayor of Kyiv shortly after his retirement in 2005. He lost the 2006 mayoral election to Leonid Chernovetskyi but placed second with 26% of the vote, ahead of the incumbent Oleksandr Omelchenko Klitschko campaigned on an anti-corruption platform and lead the bloc "Civic party" PORA-ROP (the parties PORA and Reforms and Order Party) in the simultaneously held local elections for the Kyiv City Council. Analysts stated his relatively late entry into the campaign might have cost him votes. Still, Klitschko was elected as a people's deputy to the Kyiv City Council since "Civic party" PORA-ROP won 14 seats in the 2006 election.

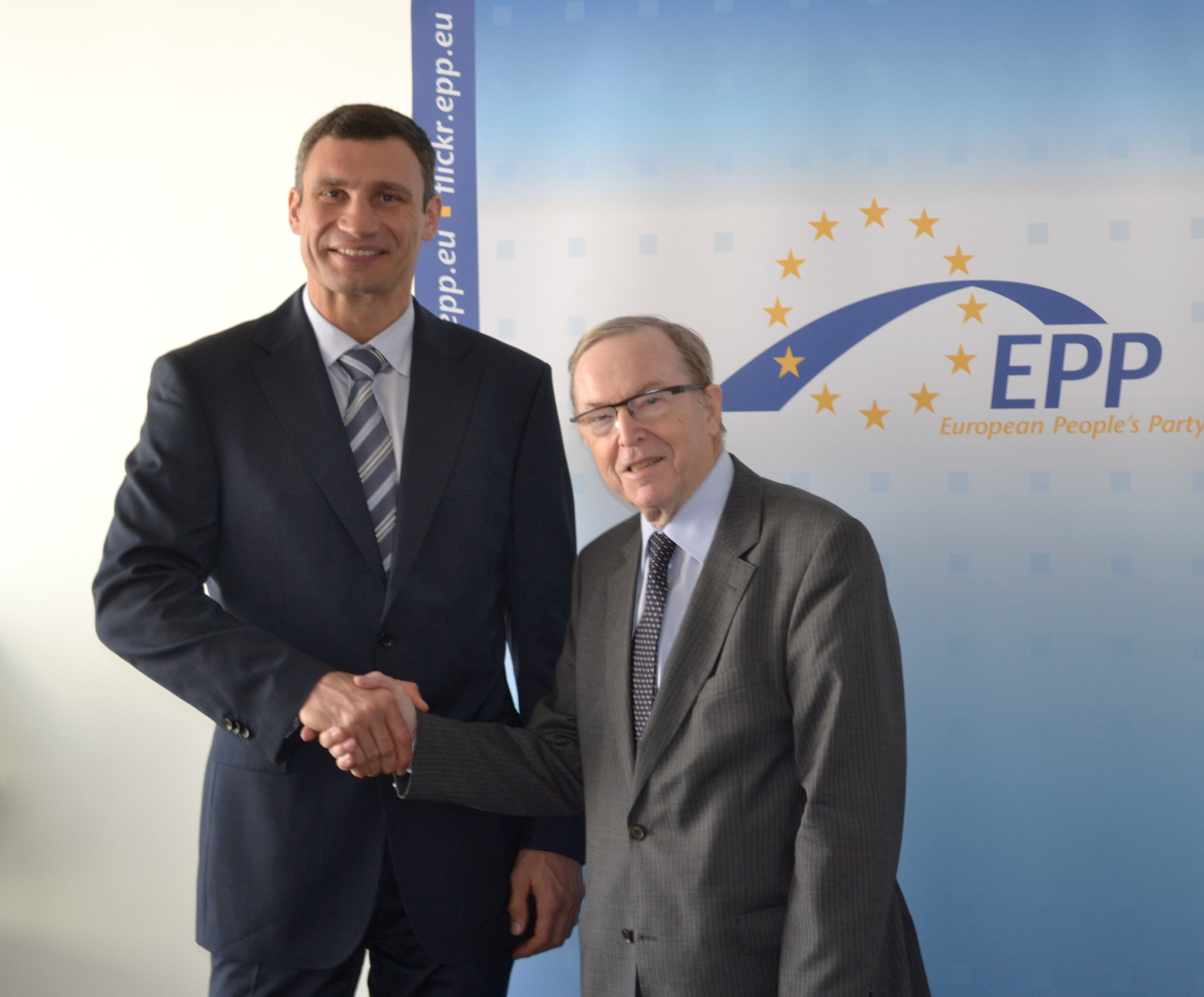
Klitschko with Wilfried Martens, former president of the European Peoples Party.

In the May 2008 Kyiv local election, he ran again and won 18% of the vote. Klitschko simultaneously led the Vitali Klitschko Bloc that won 10.61% of the votes and 15 seats and again, he was elected into the Kyiv City Council. His campaign hired Rudy Giuliani as a consultant for the campaign. In 2008, he was also appointed to the Ukrainian delegation of the Congress of the Council of Europe.

Klitschko became the leader of the political party Ukrainian Democratic Alliance for Reform (UDAR) in April 2010. During the 2010 Ukrainian local elections, the party won representatives in (Ukrainian) municipalities and Oblast Councils (regional parliaments).

Klitschko and UDAR became a partner of the Christian Democratic Union of Germany in November 2011. UDAR is supported by the German government and the Konrad Adenauer Foundation and received support in particular from Angela Merkel and also politicians from the conservative European People's Party. According to information gained by the German magazine Der Spiegel, the target was to "set up Klitschko purposefully as a new strong man in Kyiv—in order to counter this way the Kremlin's growing influence". Support consisted in logistics, training and joint performances. Assistance was also promised by Christoph Heusgen, Ronald Pofalla and Guido Westerwelle.

Klitschko, Poroshenko, Tyahnybok and U.S. Deputy Secretary of State William J. Burns, 25 February 2014

In October 2011, Klitschko announced that he would run in the 2012 Kyiv mayoral election.

During the 2012 Ukrainian parliamentary election, Klitschko was elected (he was top candidate on UDAR's party list) into the Ukrainian parliament; UDAR won 13.97% of the popular vote and 34 seats under the nationwide proportional party-list system, finishing third behind the Party of Regions and Fatherland, and another 6 seats in constituencies, thus a total of 40 seats. Support for UDAR was the least diversified at the regional level compared with the results of the other leading parties. Klitschko was chosen as the leader of the party's faction in Parliament.

Klitschko announced on 24 October 2013 that he intended to take part in the next Ukrainian presidential election that was then set for 2015. (Note: In December 2013, he stated "My plans have no changed. I made a decision [...] I will run for president of Ukraine) That same day, the parliament voted for a bill adopting two amendments to the Tax Code, according to which a person who has permanent residency in a foreign state is considered to be a person who does not live in Ukraine; the law also had a provision according to which only a person "permanently residing in Ukraine for ten years" can run for the president. 239 deputies voted for the bill, mostly from the Party of Regions and the Communist Party. Experts and lawyers then argued that it was unclear if Klitschko could take part in these elections as, according to media reports, he had a residence permit in Germany.

Opinion polls since early 2011 showed that the predicted percentage of votes that Klitschko would gain in the first round of the 2014 Ukrainian presidential election enlarged from 4.8% in December 2011 to 15.1% in February 2013, and an October 2013 Razumkov Centre poll predicted 19.3%. (Note: Since February 2013 polls predict that Klitschko will win the second round of the 2015 presidential election against incumbent President Viktor Yanukovych.) According to all opinion polls but two conducted from January to November 2013 by the Razumkov Centre, Kyiv International Institute of Sociology (KIIS), SOCIS, Rating, International Republican Institute and the Democratic Initiatives, Viktor Yanukovych and Klitschko were most likely to go into the second round. For the second round, all opinion polls conducted by same agencies during the same period of time had Vitali winning the potential run-off against Yanukovych, predicting Vitali to earn from 58% to 64%. (Note: See)

Klitschko was one of the dominant figures of the Euromaidan protests. During these protests, he retired from boxing.

=== Political views (until 2013) ===
Klitschko is in favor of the Association Agreement between Ukraine and the European Union. He sees the European Union as Ukraine's "model for [Ukraine's] future political and economic development." He believes former President Viktor Yanukovych and his government were "deliberately destroying the integration (into Europe) prospects of Ukraine" and that Ukrainian politicians have no right to let them "rule after 2014". Klitschko is also in favour of NATO-Ukraine cooperation.

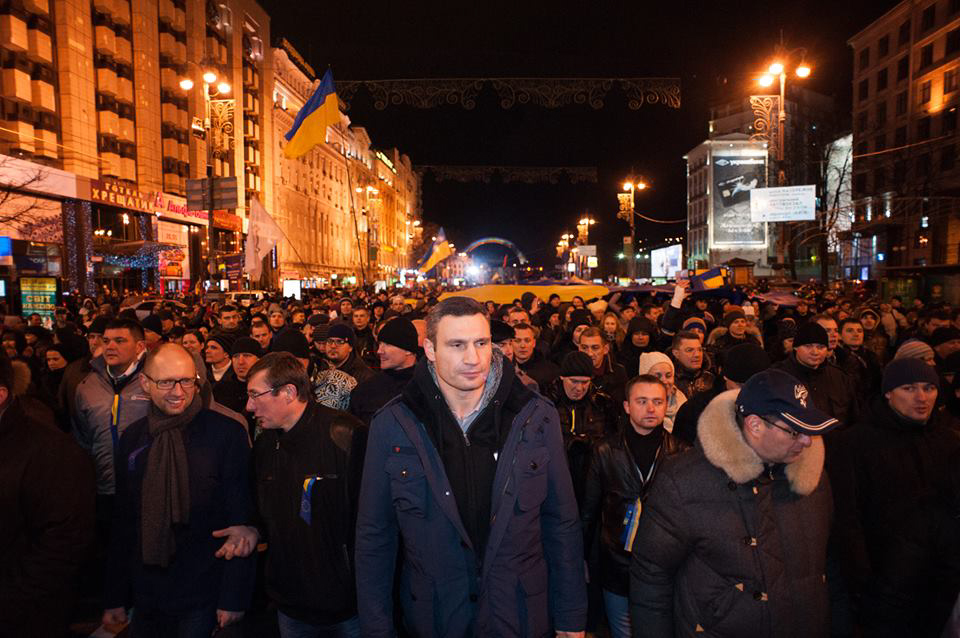
Klitschko, leader of the political party UDAR, seen in the crowd on Khreschatyk street in Kyiv, Ukraine on 27 November 2013.

Klitschko's main concern is social standards and the economy of Ukraine. He believes "the issue of language is not the top priority". Klitschko wants less corruption and more transparency in Ukrainian politics. He also advocates lower taxes to stimulate the economy. Klitschko did accuse in October 2011 President Yanukovych and the Azarov Government of "doing everything to manipulate the rules to stay in power longer"; furthermore (in December 2011) he assert(ed) "every statement of the government" as "a continuation of lies and disinformation." He has also taken part in rallies for former Prime Minister Yulia Tymoshenko's release. (Note: Klitschko wanted former Prime Minister Yulia Tymoshenko and former Interior Minister Yuriy Lutsenko to be able to participate in the 2012 parliamentary elections (Lutsenko has been charged with abuse of power and Tymoshenko has been sentenced on the same charge). Tymoshenko was released on 22 February 2014, in the concluding days of the "Revolution of Dignity", following a revision of the Ukrainian criminal code that effectively decriminalized the actions for which she was imprisoned and officially rehabilitated on 28 February 2014. Lutsenko was on 7 April 2013 released from prison because Ukrainian President Viktor Yanukovych had pardoned him (among others) for health reasons.)

In December 2011, Klitschko described the judicial system of Ukraine as "complete degradation" and accused it of violating human rights and humiliating its prisoners. According to him, Ukraine lacks independent and unbiased judges because the "Ukrainian judiciary is currently a closed system with lifelong judges and appointments made through administrative leverage". He wants to ensure the independence of judges by switching from a system of appointed judges to a system of elected judges.

In July 2012, Klitschko stated that UDAR would not cooperate with the Party of Regions in the Ukrainian Parliament. In early April 2013 Klitschko called for early presidential and parliamentary elections in Ukraine.

=== Mayor of Kyiv ===
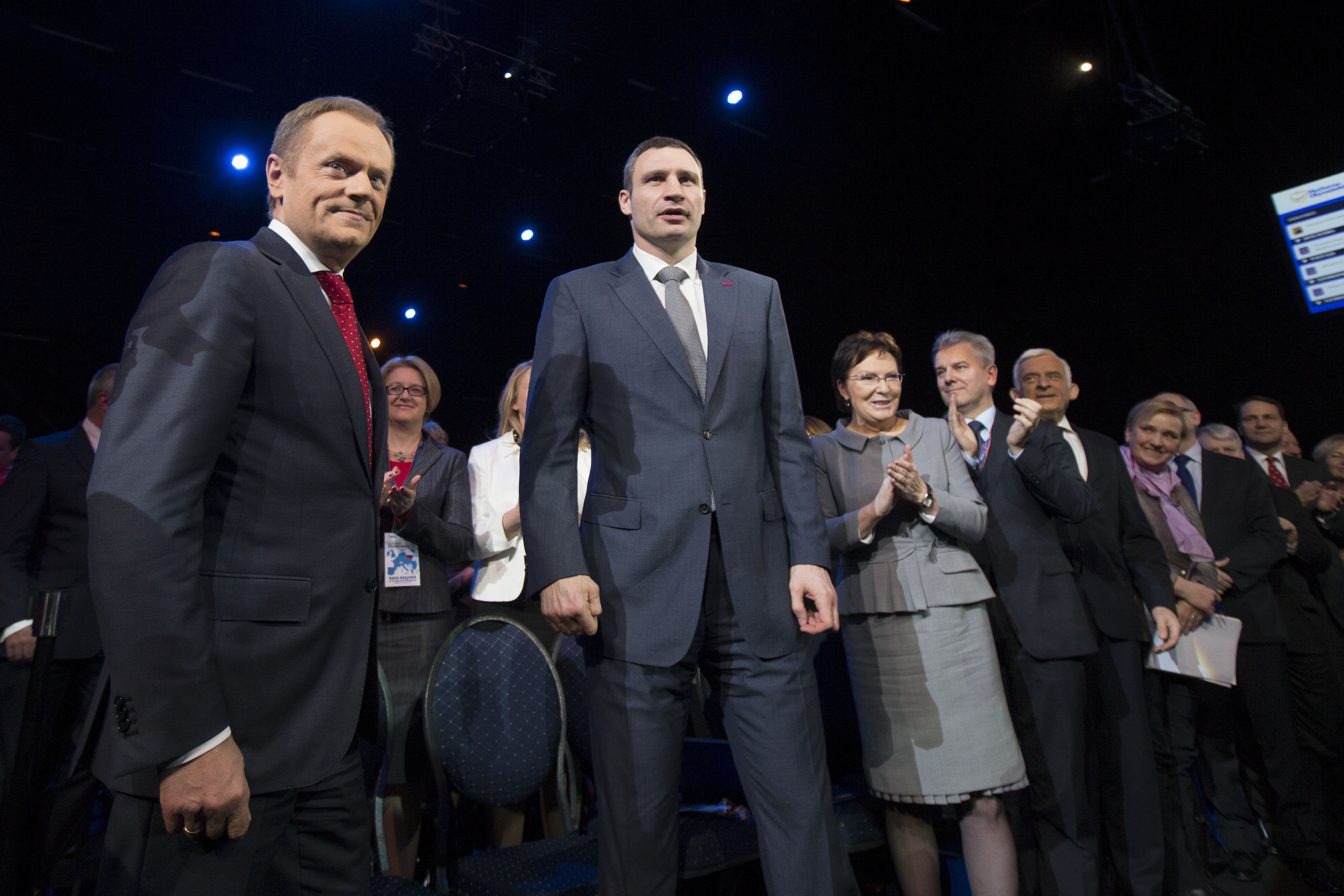
Klitschko with Polish politicians Donald Tusk and Ewa Kopacz, 22 March 2014

On 28 February 2014, Klitschko confirmed that he would take part in the (early) 2014 Ukrainian presidential election. On 29 March, he announced that he had changed his mind and would run for the post of Mayor of Kyiv in the 2014 Kyiv local election (including Mayoral elections) set for 25 May. In the 2014 Ukrainian presidential election Klitschko endorsed the candidacy of Petro Poroshenko. Klitschko won Kyiv's mayoral elections with almost 57% of the votes in the first round. He was sworn in as mayor on 5 June 2014. The same day the Ukrainian parliament had deprived Klitschko of his MP mandate (Ukrainian MPs are not entitled to combine parliamentary activities with any other public employment). Poroshenko was elected President of Ukraine on 25 May 2014.

In addition to mayoral elections, UDAR participated in the 2014 Kyiv local election. It won 30 seats in the party-list ballot (40.54% of votes) and 42 seats in constituencies, overall gaining 77 seats in the Kyiv City Council out of 120. This was the last time that half of the Kyiv City Council seats were elected in constituencies.

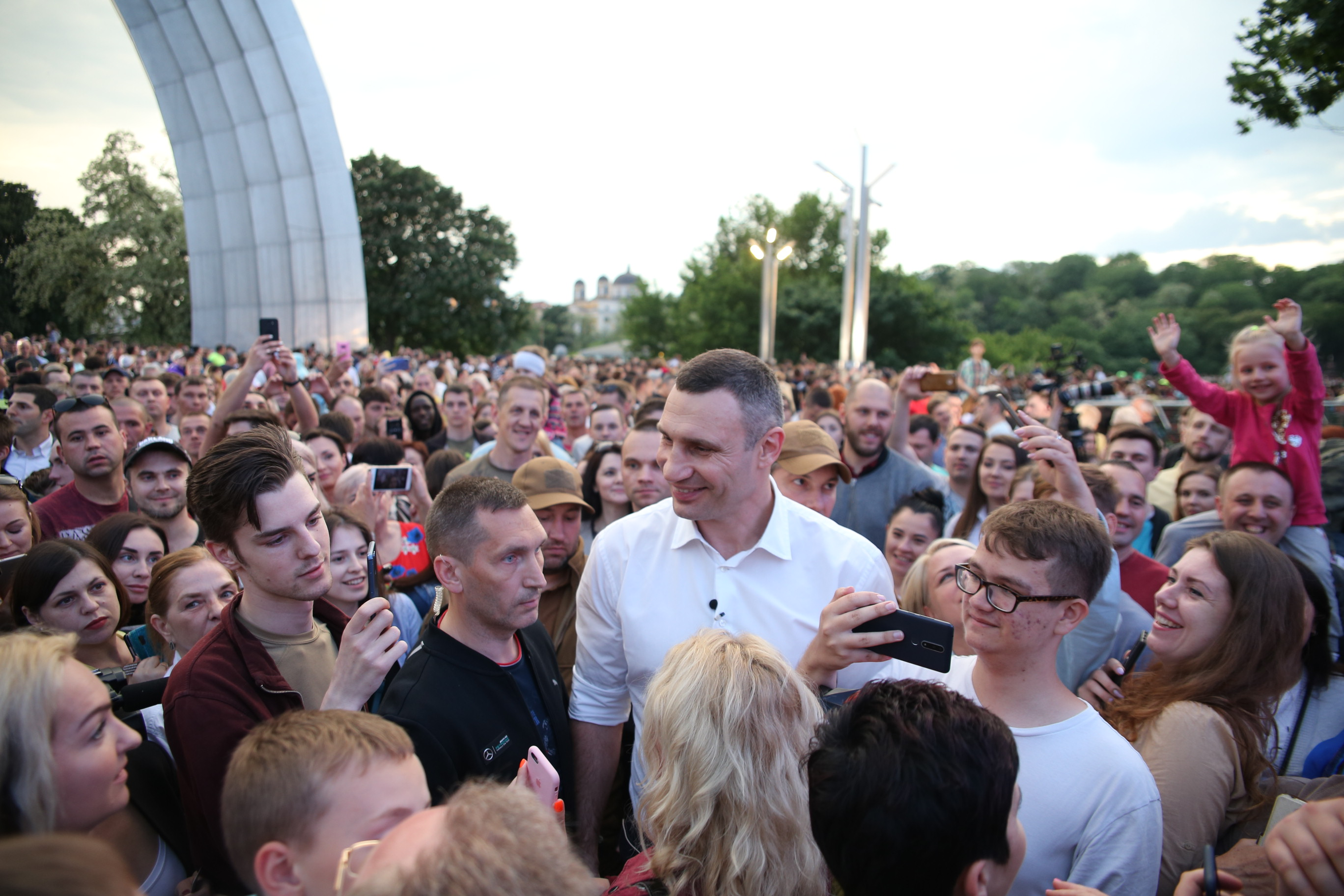
Opening of the Klitschko bridge over Saint Volodymyr Descent on 25 May 2019

Poroshenko appointed Klitschko as head of Kyiv City State Administration on 25 June 2014.

Klitschko headed the election list of the Petro Poroshenko Bloc in the late October 2014 Ukrainian parliamentary election, but he vowed not to resign as Mayor of Kyiv. On 21 November 2014 Klitschko gave up his seat in the new parliament. Petro Poroshenko Bloc won the election with 132 seats out of 423 available.

On 28 August 2015, UDAR merged into Petro Poroshenko Bloc "Solidarity". Klitschko became the new party leader. In the 2015 Kyiv mayoral election, Klitschko was reelected with 66.5% of vote. For this, he needed a second round of mayoral elections between him and Boryslav Bereza, after Klitschko scored 40.5% of the vote and Bereza 8.8% in the first round. (Bereza gained 33.51% of the vote in the second round of Mayoral elections.) Petro Poroshenko Bloc gained 52 seats in the Kyiv City Council with 27.56% of votes. On 26 May 2016, Klitschko resigned as Petro Poroshenko Bloc chairman, after a new law barring a head of administration to be chairman or a member of a political party took effect on 1 May.

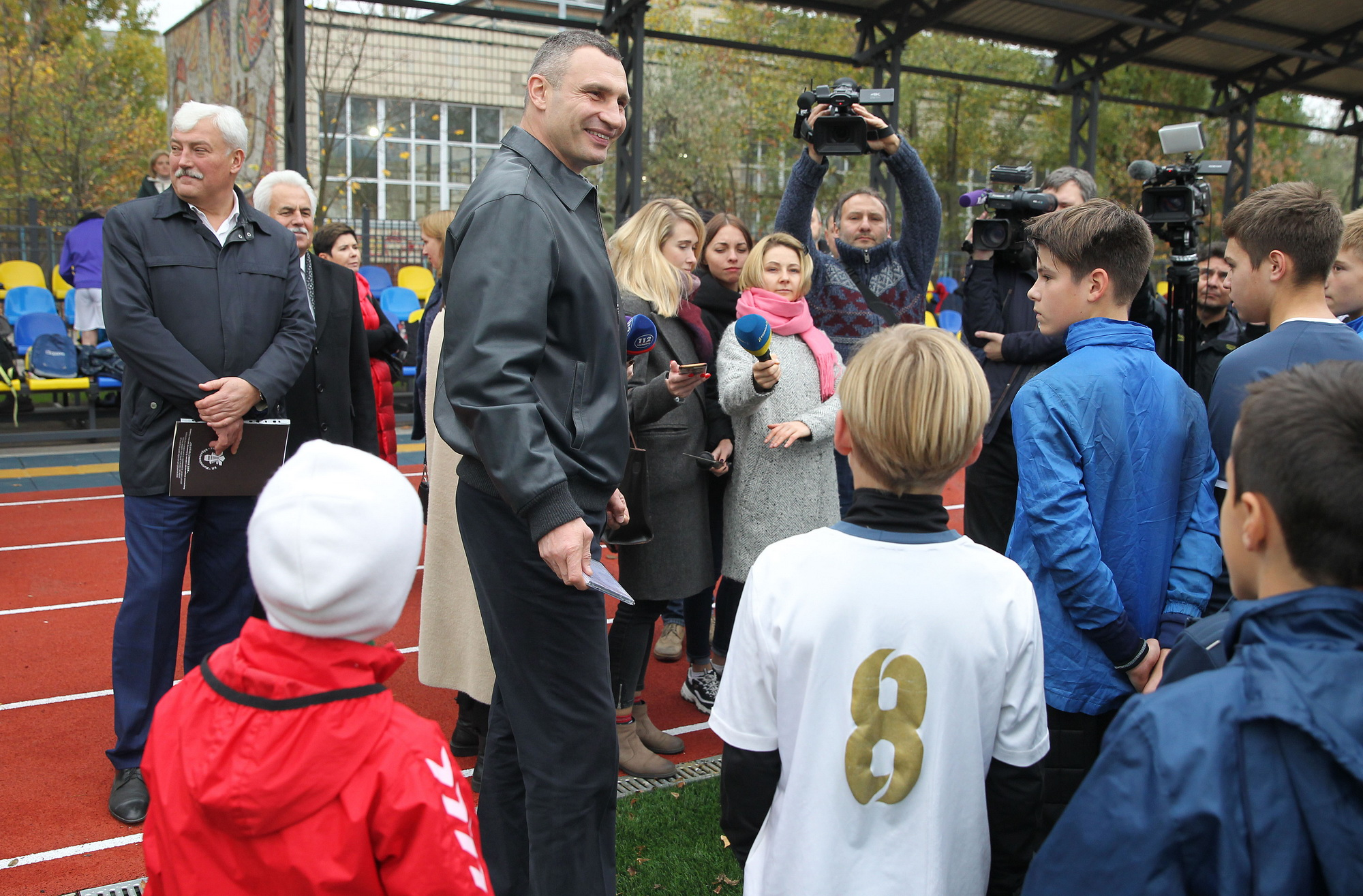
Opening of Rusanivets Stadium in Kyiv after reconstruction on 28 October 2019

On 18 May 2019, Klitschko announced that UDAR would take part in the 2019 Ukrainian parliamentary election autonomously. In the election the party only competed in 15 single-mandate constituencies. It failed to win any seats.

According to the Ukrainian Constitution the head of the Kyiv City State Administration should resign after a new President is elected. However, following the 21 April 2019 election which was won by Volodymyr Zelenskyy, Klitschko was not dismissed. A 4 September 2019 decision by the Honcharuk Government to dismiss Klitschko was not executed.

In the election for Mayor of Kyiv of the 2020 Kyiv local elections, Klitschko was again a candidate, nominated by UDAR. He was also endorsed by Petro Poroshenko's party, now named European Solidarity. He won the election in the first round with 50.52% of the votes, 365,161 people voted for him. UDAR won 30 Kyiv City Council seats out of 120 in the 2020 Kyiv local election with 19.98% of votes, finishing second behind European Solidarity (20.52% of votes; 31 seats).

As of 20 June 2026, Klitschko has served as the Mayor of Kyiv for 12 years and 15 days. He is the third longest-serving head of the city since 1835. He is also the only person since Ukraine gained its independence in 1991 to have won three direct democratic Kyiv mayoral elections.

Klitschko is a member of the Washington, D.C.-headquartered International Republican Institute's International Advisory Council.

==== Russian invasion of Ukraine ====
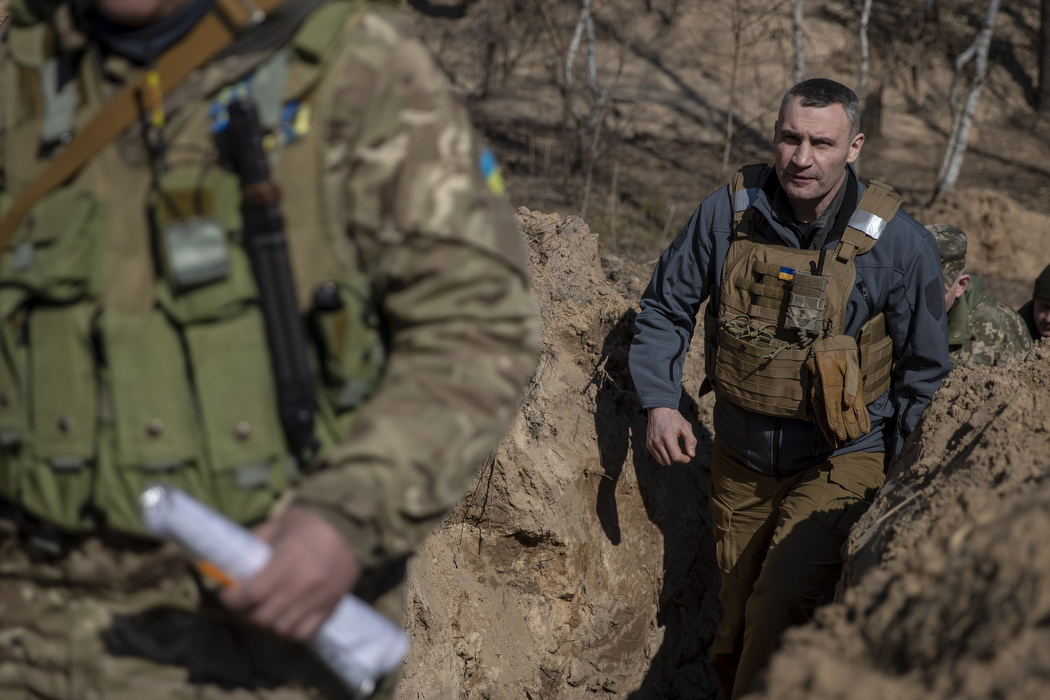
Klitschko near the front line on 19 March 2022

In February 2022, Klitschko and his brother Wladimir Klitschko pledged to take up arms to protect the capital of Ukraine, Kyiv, in response to Russia's invasion of Ukraine that began on 24 February. On 25 February, Klitschko posted a video on his Telegram channel to report on casualties in the capital city, stating, "The night was difficult, but there are no Russian troops in the capital. The enemy is trying to break into the city, in particular, from [the direction of] Hostomel, Zhytomyr." On 11 March Klitschko made a guest appearance on CNN's State of the Union.

On 15 March, Klitschko announced a 36-hour curfew from Tuesday night amid what he called a difficult and dangerous moment, stating, "I ask all Kyivites to get prepared to stay at home for two days, or if the sirens go off, in the shelters," About half of Kyiv's 3.4 million residents had fled. On 23 March, Klitschko and his brother reported from a bandstand in a park victories around Kyiv: Ukrainian forces had taken back most of Irpin (east of Kyiv), all of Makariv (west of Kyiv) and were battling for the village of Liutizh, 20 miles to the north. By 31 March, Russian forces had withdrawn from Kyiv.

On 10 March 2022, Vitali and Wladimir announced via Telegram that they had raised €100 million of financial support for Ukraine with a fundraising campaign in Germany.

On 6 May, Klitschko warned that there was a high probability of rocket fire across Ukraine in the coming days. There were no plans for a curfew but street patrols would be reinforced. On 23 May, Klitschko and Ukraine Foreign Minister Dmytro Kuleba were in Davos, Switzerland to attend the World Economic Forum annual meeting. Klitschko and his brother spoke at length to an audience the same day. They told delegates to back Ukraine despite the economic pain, and that "we are defending you". They later said in an interview with Sky News, that the "biggest mistake" their audience could make was to think that the "Ukraine war doesn't affect everyone."

On 18 June, Klitschko said that Vladimir Putin was destroying millions of lives in both Ukraine and Russia, adding that Russian soldiers are dying for nothing more than Putin's ambitions. At the end of June, the Klitschko brothers attended, along with a large delegation of Ukrainians, the 2022 NATO Madrid summit.

On 23 July 2022, The Times posted an article in which it alleged that Vitali and Wladimir were on Vladimir Putin's personal hitlist of 24 high-profile Ukrainian figures whom he wanted assassinated.

In a December 2023 interview with Der Spiegel, Klitschko accused President Zelenskyy of authoritarianism due to the president's use of powers under martial law. Of the president, Klitschko said, "At some point we will no longer be any different from Russia, where everything depends on the whim of one man."

On 17 October 2026, Klitschko faced calls to resign for failing to prepare for the winter when critical infrastructure was damaged by air strikes and mismanagement. The failure to prepare was even criticized by President Zelenskyy.

== Sporting legacy ==
Having never been knocked down, Vitali Klitschko is only the third heavyweight champion to finish his career with this distinction, following Nikolai Valuev and Oliver McCall. His 87% knockout percentage is regarded as one of the best knockout-to-fight ratios of any champion in heavyweight boxing history. Vitali was also known for being unusually dominant in his fights, having rarely lost a round in his professional career as a boxer. During his time as WBC champion, Vitali Klitschko was described as being the best of his time, and George Foreman stated that he has the best straight left in the division. Both Klitschko brothers are considered the best heavyweight boxers of their era. Having remained undefeated for a large majority of their careers and refusing to fight each other, both brothers remained largely unchallenged throughout their careers. Notably, both brothers were particularly well known for using their large size to nullify other heavyweights. In 2011, Wladimir and Vitali entered the Guinness World Records book as the pair of brothers with most world heavyweight title fight wins (30 at the time; 40 as of 2020).

Considered national heroes in Ukraine, in 2008 the Klitschko brothers were voted the 15th greatest Ukrainians of all time following a nation-wide poll that saw around 2.5 million people casting their votes. Boxing fights involving one of the Klitschko brothers attracted between 10 and 20 million viewers in Ukraine; some of their fights generated even bigger viewership numbers. Vitali has been named multiple times among the 100 most influential people in Ukraine by Korrespondent: he was ranked 60th in 2006, 44th in 2010, 41st in 2011, 16th in 2012, 10th in 2013, 23rd in 2017 and 28th in 2019 (the ranking wasn't conducted between 2014 and 2016).

The Klitschkos were also considered big stars in Germany. A survey carried out by TNS for the Horizont Sport Business in 2003 showed that 90.9% of respondents recognized Vitali while 70.7% celebrated his successes, making him the sixth most recognized and second most beloved athlete in Germany at the time. According to DW, another research conducted no later than 2011 showed that nearly 99% of people in Germany recognized the Klitschko brothers. The CPI Index conducted by the agency Celebrity Performance in 2012 had the Klitschkos ranked second on the list of the most marketable celebrities in Germany, while in January 2014, based on a survey of 1151 respondents that was conducted by the same agency, the Klitschko brothers were ranked 6th in the "2013 Person of the Year" category. At least two of Vitali's fights finished among the top 10 most-watched television broadcasts of the year. At least eight of his fights generated over 9 million average viewers. The Rammstein song Sonne was written as his entrance song.

Throughout his career, Vitali has defeated 15 boxers for the world heavyweight title, the fifth-most in history (tied with Lennox Lewis), including two—Corrie Sanders and Danny Williams—for The Ring world heavyweight championship. Klitschko is one of nine boxers to defeat at least ten different fighters for the world heavyweight title. As of April 2025, BoxRec ranks Klitschko among the 100 greatest boxers of all time, pound for pound. He is the only heavyweight boxer to have reigned as world champion in three different decades. Klitschko and George Foreman are the only heavyweight boxers in history to defend a world title after turning 40. According to BoxRec, Vitali has defeated 7 previously undefeated fighters with a combined record 135–0–3 (95 KOs) – these 7 included Alben Belinski (professional record 5–0, 5 KOs coming into the fight), Ed Mahone (21–0–2, 21 KOs), Timo Hoffmann (22–0, 13 KOs), Chris Arreola (27–0, 24 KOs), Kevin Johnson (22–0–1, 9 KOs), Odlanier Solis (17–0, 12 KOs) and Manuel Charr (21–0, 11 KOs). Vitali has defeated 7 current or former world champions throughout his career. Those included heavyweight champions Corrie Sanders, Shannon Briggs and Samuel Peter, two-weight world champion Tomasz Adamek, and cruiserweight champions Juan Carlos Gomez and Orlin Norris.

At the end of 2004, Vitali was honoured with the Hero of Ukraine Order of State, the highest Ukrainian honour, for his achievements and contributions to the development of Ukrainian sports. In 2010, Vitali was awarded the German Cross of the Order of Merit, the highest German honour, for his social and political engagement. In 2013, Klitschko was awarded the Georgian Presidential Order of Excellence. In 2018, Vitali was inducted into the International Boxing Hall of Fame. He was elected in his first year of eligibility. Known for charity work and philanthropy, both Vitali and Wladimir are among only 15 current or former alive athletes that have been named UNESCO Champions for Sport.

== Personal life ==
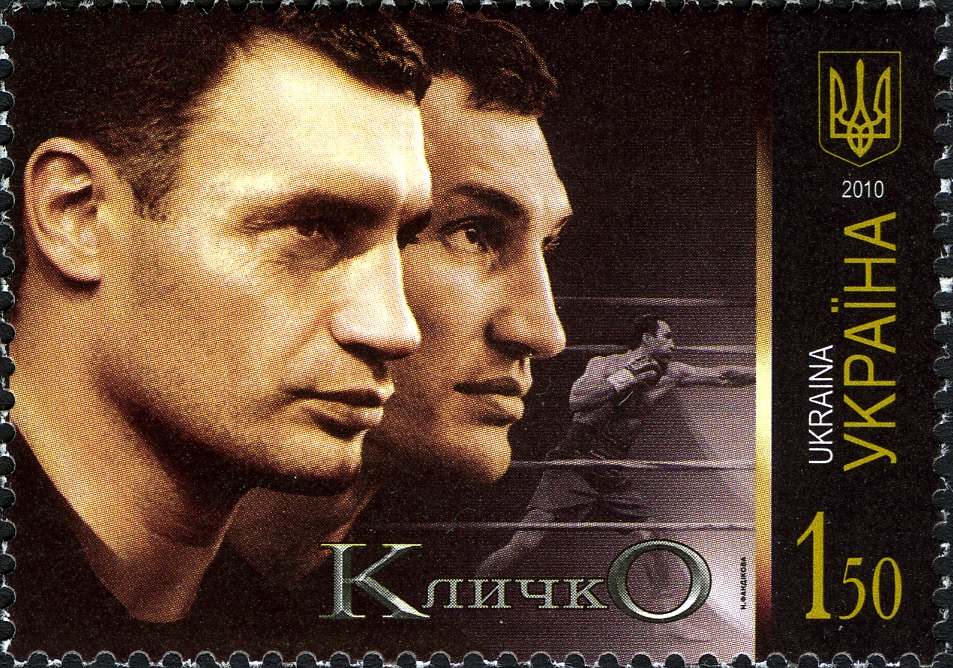
Klitschko brothers on a 2010 Ukrainian stamp

Klitschko's father, Volodymyr Rodionovych Klitschko (1947–2011), was a Soviet Air Force major general and a Soviet military attaché in East Germany. Klitschko's paternal grandmother was Jewish. Part of Klitschko's family died during Holodomor, while his great-grandfather and family members on the female line of his mother died in the Holocaust.

The Klitschko brothers lived as children in Czechoslovakia from 1980 to 1985, where their father was stationed with the Soviet Forces. They attended a school designated for children of Soviet soldiers in the town of Mimoň in Northern Bohemia.

The Klitschko brothers lived in Pripyat, Ukrainian SSR from 1985 to 1986, when the town was evacuated following the Chernobyl nuclear disaster. Their father, Volodymyr Rodionovych Klitschko (1947–2011) was also one of the commanders in charge of cleaning up the effects of the disaster in 1986 and was afterward diagnosed with cancer. The former colonel in the Soviet Union's air force died from lymph node cancer, according to the brothers' management team. He also served as a military attache at the embassy of Ukraine in Germany. His mother is Nadiya Ulyanivna.

Klitschko worked at Kyiv Automation Plant as a toolmaker as a young man.

In December 2013, Mykola Chynchyn, the chairman of the Main Investigation Department of the Ministry of Internal Affairs of Ukraine during the presidency of Viktor Yanukovych, accused Klitschko of having worked as a debt collector in the 1990s for mafia boss Viktor Rybalko. (Note: After 25 December 2013 attack on Tetiana Chornovol police investigator Mykola Chynchyn stated that one of the suspects in this case used to be in a criminal organization led by Viktor Rybalko; and added "The Klitschko brothers allegedly were closely involved in Rybalko's organization".) Klitschko has vehemently denied links to Rybalko.

Klitschko and Natalija Jehorova, a former athlete and model, married on 26 April 1996. They have three children. On 15 August 2022, Vitali announced that he and Natalija were divorcing.

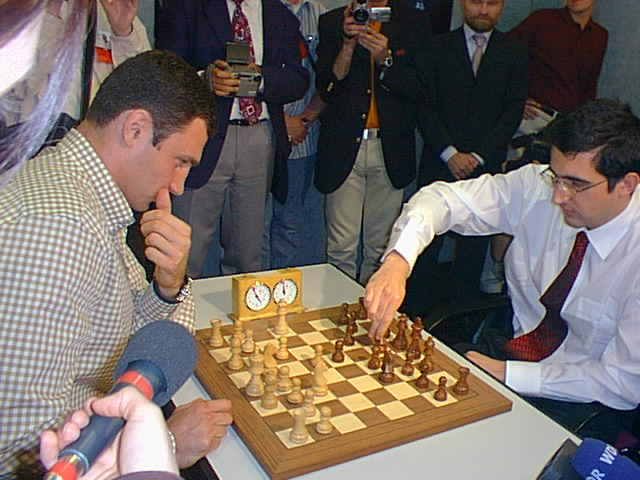
Vitali Klitschko (left) playing chess with Vladimir Kramnik, Dortmund, 2002

In 1996, Klitschko graduated from the Pereyaslav-Khmelnytsky Pedagogical Institute (Ukraine) and was accepted into the postgraduate study program at the Taras Shevchenko National University of Kyiv. On 29 February 2000, he presented his doctoral thesis on "talent and sponsorship in sports" at the "Kyiv University of Physical Science and Sports" and his PhD in Sports Science was conferred.

In addition to residing in Kyiv, Klitschko has lived for years in Germany. According to Klitschko "Germany adopted me, I really love Germany, but I'm not German".

Both Klitschko and his brother Wladimir are avid chess players. Vitali is a friend of former world chess champion Vladimir Kramnik and the two have played, with Kramnik always winning. Klitschko has commented that "chess is similar to boxing. You need to develop a strategy, and you need to think two or three steps ahead about what your opponent is doing. You have to be smart. But what's the difference between chess and boxing? In chess, nobody is an expert, but everybody plays. In boxing everybody is an expert, but nobody fights."

Both Klitschko brothers also have been involved in charitable activities dedicated to supporting the needs of schools, churches and children. In 2002, the Klitschko brothers announced that they had agreed to work for UNESCO. Vitali and his brother never fought each other in a professional fight as their mother made them promise to never fight each other.

Klitschko is fluent in four languages: Ukrainian, Russian, English and German.

== Awards and honors ==
- In 2010, Klitschko was awarded the German Cross of the Order of Merit for his social and political engagement
- In 2013, Klitschko was awarded the Georgian Presidential Order of Excellence
- In 2016, Klitschko was named The Eternal world heavyweight champion by the WBC; the title is awarded to dominant boxers that were undefeated as champions and had plenty of successful title defenses throughout their careers
- In 2022, Klitschko was named an honorary member of the European Committee of the Regions
- In 2022, Klitschko was named winner of ESPY's Arthur Ashe Award For Courage

== Professional boxing record ==
47 fights	45 wins	2 losses
By knockout	41	2
By decision	4	0

No.	Result	Record	Opponent	Type	Round, time	Date	Age	Location	Notes
47	Win	45–2	Mahmoud Charr	TKO	4 (12), 2:04	8 Sep 2012	41 years, 51 days	Olympic Stadium, Moscow, Russia	Retained WBC heavyweight title
46	Win	44–2	Derek Chisora	UD	12	18 Feb 2012	40 years, 214 days	Olympiahalle, Munich, Germany	Retained WBC heavyweight title
45	Win	43–2	Tomasz Adamek	TKO	10 (12), 2:20	10 Sep 2011	40 years, 53 days	Stadion Miejski, Wrocław, Poland	Retained WBC heavyweight title
44	Win	42–2	Odlanier Solís	KO	1 (12), 3:00	19 Mar 2011	39 years, 243 days	Lanxess Arena, Cologne, Germany	Retained WBC heavyweight title
43	Win	41–2	Shannon Briggs	UD	12	16 Oct 2010	39 years, 89 days	O2 World, Hamburg, Germany	Retained WBC heavyweight title
42	Win	40–2	Albert Sosnowski	KO	10 (12), 2:30	29 May 2010	38 years, 314 days	Veltins-Arena, Gelsenkirchen, Germany	Retained WBC heavyweight title
41	Win	39–2	Kevin Johnson	UD	12	12 Dec 2009	38 years, 146 days	PostFinance Arena, Bern, Switzerland	Retained WBC heavyweight title
40	Win	38–2	Chris Arreola	RTD	10 (12), 3:00	26 Sep 2009	38 years, 69 days	Staples Center, Los Angeles, California, US	Retained WBC heavyweight title
39	Win	37–2	Juan Carlos Gómez	TKO	9 (12), 1:49	21 Mar 2009	37 years, 245 days	Hanns-Martin-Schleyer-Halle, Stuttgart, Germany	Retained WBC heavyweight title
38	Win	36–2	Samuel Peter	RTD	8 (12), 3:00	11 Oct 2008	37 years, 84 days	O2 World, Berlin, Germany	Won WBC heavyweight title
37	Win	35–2	Danny Williams	TKO	8 (12), 1:26	11 Dec 2004	33 years, 145 days	Mandalay Bay Events Center, Paradise, Nevada, US	Retained WBC and The Ring heavyweight titles
36	Win	34–2	Corrie Sanders	TKO	8 (12), 2:46	24 Apr 2004	32 years, 280 days	Staples Center, Los Angeles, California, US	Won vacant WBC and The Ring heavyweight titles
35	Win	33–2	Kirk Johnson	TKO	2 (12), 2:54	6 Dec 2003	32 years, 140 days	Madison Square Garden, New York City, New York, US	
34	Loss	32–2	Lennox Lewis	RTD	6 (12), 3:00	21 Jun 2003	31 years, 337 days	Staples Center, Los Angeles, California, US	For WBC, IBO, and The Ring heavyweight titles
33	Win	32–1	Larry Donald	TKO	10 (12), 2:35	23 Nov 2002	31 years, 127 days	Westfalenhallen, Dortmund, Germany	Retained WBA Inter-Continental heavyweight title
32	Win	31–1	Vaughn Bean	TKO	11 (12), 1:40	8 Feb 2002	30 years, 204 days	Volkswagen Halle, Braunschweig, Germany	Retained WBA Inter-Continental heavyweight title
31	Win	30–1	Ross Puritty	TKO	11 (12), 1:16	8 Dec 2001	30 years, 142 days	König Pilsener Arena, Oberhausen, Germany	Retained WBA Inter-Continental heavyweight title
30	Win	29–1	Orlin Norris	KO	1 (12), 1:09	27 Jan 2001	29 years, 192 days	Rudi-Sedlmayer-Halle, Munich, Germany	Won vacant WBA Inter-Continental heavyweight title
29	Win	28–1	Timo Hoffmann	UD	12	25 Nov 2000	29 years, 129 days	Preussag Arena, Hanover, Germany	Won vacant European heavyweight title
28	Loss	27–1	Chris Byrd	RTD	9 (12), 3:00	1 Apr 2000	28 years, 257 days	Estrel Hotel, Berlin, Germany	Lost WBO heavyweight title
27	Win	27–0	Obed Sullivan	RTD	9 (12), 3:00	11 Dec 1999	28 years, 145 days	Alsterdorfer Sporthalle, Hamburg, Germany	Retained WBO heavyweight title
26	Win	26–0	Ed Mahone	TKO	3 (12), 1:45	9 Oct 1999	28 years, 82 days	Arena Oberhausen, Oberhausen, Germany	Retained WBO heavyweight title
25	Win	25–0	Herbie Hide	KO	2 (12), 1:14	26 Jun 1999	27 years, 342 days	London Arena, London, England	Won WBO heavyweight title
24	Win	24–0	Ismael Youla	TKO	2 (12), 1:30	20 Feb 1999	27 years, 216 days	Alsterdorfer Sporthalle, Hamburg, Germany	Retained European heavyweight title
23	Win	23–0	Francesco Spinelli	TKO	1 (12), 1:49	5 Dec 1998	27 years, 139 days	Palace of Sports, Kyiv, Ukraine	Retained European heavyweight title
22	Win	22–0	Mario Schiesser	TKO	2 (12), 2:00	24 Oct 1998	27 years, 97 days	Alsterdorfer Sporthalle, Hamburg, Germany	Won vacant European heavyweight title
21	Win	21–0	Ricardo Kennedy	TKO	1 (8), 1:31	11 Aug 1998	27 years, 23 days	Miccosukee Resort & Gaming, Miami, Florida, US	
20	Win	20–0	José Ribalta	TKO	2 (8), 2:13	5 Jun 1998	26 years, 321 days	Sporthalle Wandsbek, Hamburg, Germany	
19	Win	19–0	Dicky Ryan	TKO	5 (12)	2 May 1998	26 years, 287 days	Hansehalle, Lübeck, Germany	Won vacant WBO Inter-Continental heavyweight title
18	Win	18–0	Julius Francis	TKO	2 (12)	18 Apr 1998	26 years, 273 days	Eurogress, Aachen, Germany	
17	Win	17–0	Levi Billups	KO	2 (10)	20 Mar 1998	26 years, 244 days	Ballsporthalle, Frankfurt, Germany	
16	Win	16–0	Louis Monaco	KO	3 (10)	7 Mar 1998	26 years, 231 days	Sartory Saale, Cologne, Germany	
15	Win	15–0	Alben Belinski	KO	2 (8)	30 Jan 1998	26 years, 195 days	Berdux Filmstudios, Munich, Germany	
14	Win	14–0	Marcus Rhode	TKO	2 (10)	17 Jan 1998	26 years, 182 days	Sport- und Erholungszentrum, Berlin, Germany	
13	Win	13–0	Anthony Willis	KO	5 (8)	20 Dec 1997	26 years, 154 days	Oberrheinhalle, Offenburg, Germany	
12	Win	12–0	Herman Delgado	TKO	3 (8)	29 Nov 1997	26 years, 133 days	Rheinstrandhalle, Karlsruhe, Germany	
11	Win	11–0	Gilberto Williamson	KO	6 (8), 2:50	8 Nov 1997	26 years, 112 days	Ballsporthalle, Frankfurt, Germany	
10	Win	10–0	Will Hinton	KO	2 (6)	4 Oct 1997	26 years, 77 days	Stadionsporthalle, Hanover, Germany	
9	Win	9–0	Jimmy Haynes	KO	2 (6)	14 Jun 1997	25 years, 330 days	Saaltheater Hubert Geulen, Aachen, Germany	
8	Win	8–0	Cleveland Woods	KO	2 (6), 2:16	10 May 1997	25 years, 295 days	Ballsporthalle, Frankfurt, Germany	
7	Win	7–0	Derrick Roddy	TKO	2 (6), 2:14	12 Apr 1997	25 years, 267 days	Eurogress, Aachen, Germany	
6	Win	6–0	Calvin Jones	KO	1 (6), 2:58	8 Mar 1997	25 years, 232 days	Sartory Saale, Cologne, Germany	
5	Win	5–0	Troy Roberts	TKO	2 (6), 1:14	22 Feb 1997	25 years, 218 days	Sporthalle Wandsbek, Hamburg, Germany	
4	Win	4–0	Mike Acklie	KO	1 (6), 0:32	25 Jan 1997	25 years, 190 days	Maritim Hotel, Stuttgart, Germany	
3	Win	3–0	Brian Sargent	TKO	2 (6), 1:08	21 Dec 1996	25 years, 155 days	Zoological Garden, Frankfurt, Germany	
2	Win	2–0	Frantisek Sumina	TKO	1 (4), 1:12	30 Nov 1996	25 years, 134 days	Arena Nova, Wiener Neustadt, Austria	
1	Win	1–0	Tony Bradham	KO	2 (4), 1:14	16 Nov 1996	25 years, 120 days	Sporthalle Wandsbek, Hamburg, Germany	

== Titles in boxing ==
=== Major world titles ===
- WBC heavyweight champion (200+ lbs) (2×)
- WBO heavyweight champion (200+ lbs)

=== The Ring magazine titles ===
- The Ring heavyweight champion (200+ lbs)

=== Regional/International titles ===
- WBA Inter-Continental heavyweight champion (200+ lbs)
- WBO Inter-Continental heavyweight champion (200+ lbs)
- European heavyweight champion (200+ lbs) (2×)

=== Honorary titles ===
- WBC Eternal Champion
- WBC Emeritus Champion

== Professional kickboxing record (incomplete) ==
Professional Kickboxing record
34 wins (22 knockouts,) 2 losses (2 knockouts.)
Date	Result	Opponent	Event	Location	Method	Round	Time
1993-11-27	Win	(Japan) Ryūshi Yanagisawa	AJKF "Evolution Step 8"	Tokyo, Japan	Decision (Unanimous)	5	2:00
1992-09-06	Win	(United States) Brad Hefton	ISKA USA Vs. The World	Las Vegas, Nevada, USA	Decision (Unanimous)	12	2:00
Wins the ISKA Full Contact World Super Heavyweight Championship.
Legend: Win Loss Draw/No contest Notes

== Viewership ==
=== International ===
Date	Fight	Billing	Viewership	Country	Network	Source(s)	Note(s)
9 October 1999	Vitali Klitschko vs. Ed Mahone	Klitschko vs. Mahone	11,000,000	Ukraine	1+1		(Note: Total viewers)
1 April 2000	Vitali Klitschko vs. Chris Byrd	Klitschko vs. Byrd	9,790,000	Germany	Sat.1		(Note: Average viewers)
1 April 2000	Vitali Klitschko vs. Chris Byrd	Klitschko vs. Byrd	2,473,000	United States	HBO		(Note: Average number of households)
8 December 2001	Vitali Klitschko vs. Ross Puritty	Revenge of the Brother II	7,390,000	Germany	Sat.1		
23 November 2002	Vitali Klitschko vs. Larry Donald	Klitschko vs. Donald	8,410,000	Germany	ZDF		
21 June 2003	Lennox Lewis vs. Vitali Klitschko	Battle of the Titans	7,036,000	United States	HBO		
21 June 2003	Lennox Lewis vs. Vitali Klitschko	Battle of the Titans	4,600,000	United States	HBO		
24 April 2004	Vitali Klitschko vs. Corrie Sanders	Let the Next Era Begin	3,300,000	United States	HBO		
24 April 2004	Vitali Klitschko vs. Corrie Sanders	Let the Next Era Begin	2,300,000	United States	HBO		
11 December 2004	Vitali Klitschko vs. Danny Williams	Klitschko vs. Williams: KO in NY	17,500,000	Russia	1 Kanal		(Note: Viewers aged 10+)
11 October 2008	Samuel Peter vs. Vitali Klitschko	Dangerzone	9,670,000	Germany	RTL Television		
21 March 2009	Vitali Klitschko vs. Juan Carlos Gomez	Universum Presents Boxing	10,880,000	Germany	RTL Television		
26 September 2009	Vitali Klitschko vs. Chris Arreola	No Mercy	5,000,000	Russia	N/A		
26 September 2009	Vitali Klitschko vs. Chris Arreola	No Mercy	2,100,000	United States	HBO		
12 December 2009	Vitali Klitschko vs. Kevin Johnson	Klitschko Time	11,160,000	Germany	RTL Television		
29 May 2010	Vitali Klitschko vs. Albert Sosnowski	Fists of Steel	6,710,000	Germany	RTL Television		
16 October 2010	Vitali Klitschko vs. Shannon Briggs	Thunderstorm	13,290,000	Germany	RTL Television		
16 October 2010	Vitali Klitschko vs. Shannon Briggs	Thunderstorm	13,000,000	Ukraine	Inter		
19 March 2011	Vitali Klitschko vs. Odlanier Solís	Dr. Eisenfaust vs. La Sombra	10,980,000	Germany	RTL Television		
10 September 2011	Vitali Klitschko vs. Tomasz Adamek	Battle of the 21st Century	9,510,000	Germany	RTL Television		
10 September 2011	Vitali Klitschko vs. Tomasz Adamek	Battle of the 21st Century	1,150,000	Poland	RTL Television		
18 February 2012	Vitali Klitschko vs. Derek Chisora	Showdown in Munich	12,880,000	Germany	RTL Television		
18 February 2012	Vitali Klitschko vs. Derek Chisora	Showdown in Munich	400,000	Hungary	Sport1		
18 February 2012	Vitali Klitschko vs. Derek Chisora	Showdown in Munich	3,309,000	Poland	Polsat		
18 February 2012	Vitali Klitschko vs. Derek Chisora	Showdown in Munich	525,000	Poland	Polsat Sport		
18 February 2012	Vitali Klitschko vs. Derek Chisora	Showdown in Munich	208,000	Poland	Polsat Sport Extra		
18 February 2012	Vitali Klitschko vs. Derek Chisora	Showdown in Munich	20,200,000	Ukraine	Inter		
18 February 2012	Vitali Klitschko vs. Derek Chisora	Showdown in Munich	10,000,000	Ukraine	Inter		
8 September 2012	Vitali Klitschko vs. Manuel Charr	Klitschko vs. Charr	8,750,000	Germany	RTL Television		
	Total viewership		208,921,000				

=== Pay-per-view bouts ===
Date	Fight	Billing	Pay-per-view buys	Country	Network	Source(s)
11 December 2004	Vitali Klitschko vs. Danny Williams	Klitschko vs. Williams: KO in NY	120,000	United States	HBO PPV	
29 May 2010	Vitali Klitschko vs. Albert Sosnowski	Fists of Steel	200,000	United States	Integrated Sports PPV	
10 September 2011	Vitali Klitschko vs. Tomasz Adamek	Battle of the 21st Century	200,000	Poland	Cyfra+ PPV	
	Total sales		520,000			

== See also ==
- List of The Ring world champions
- List of world heavyweight boxing champions
- List of mayors of Kyiv

== Notes ==
Sporting positions
Regional boxing titles
Vacant Title last held by Pelé Reid	WBO Inter-Continental heavyweight champion 2 May 1998 – 10 October 1998; Vacated	Vacant Title next held by Danny Williams
Vacant Title last held by Zeljko Mavrovic	European heavyweight champion 24 October 1998 – 26 June 1999; Vacated	Vacant Title next held by Wladimir Klitschko
Vacant Title last held by Wladimir Klitschko	European heavyweight champion 25 November 2000 – 5 January 2002; Vacated	Vacant Title next held by Luan Krasniqi
Vacant Title last held by Wladimir Klitschko	WBA Inter-Continental heavyweight champion 27 January 2001 – 21 June 2003; Vacated	Vacant Title next held by Wladimir Klitschko
World boxing titles
Preceded by Herbie Hide	WBO heavyweight champion 26 June 1999 – 1 April 2000	Succeeded by Chris Byrd
Vacant Title last held by Lennox Lewis	WBC heavyweight champion 24 April 2004 – 9 November 2005; Retired	Succeeded by Hasim Rahman promoted from interim status
Vacant Title last held by Lennox Lewis	The Ring heavyweight champion 24 April 2004 – 9 November 2005; Retired	Vacant Title next held by Wladimir Klitschko
Preceded by Samuel Peter	WBC heavyweight champion 11 October 2008 – 16 December 2013; Retired	Vacant Title next held by Bermane Stiverne
Awards
Previous: Paulie Malignaggi	The Ring Comeback of the Year; 2008	Next: Floyd Mayweather Jr.
Records
Preceded by Jess Willard; 1.99 m (6 ft 6 ½ in)	Tallest world champion 2.01 m (6 ft 7 in); 26 June 1999 – 17 December 2005; With: Henry Akinwande	Succeeded by Nikolai Valuev; 2.14 m (7 ft 0 in)
Preceded by Mac Foster; Alex Stewart; 24	Most consecutive knockouts from the start of a heavyweight career 27; 26 June 1999 – 27 April 2013	Succeeded by Deontay Wilder; 32
Party political offices
Preceded by Roman Romaniuk	Leader of the Ukrainian Democratic; Alliance for Reform; 2010–2015	Position abolished
Political offices
Preceded by Halyna Hereha; Acting	Mayor of Kyiv; 2014–present	Incumbent
Preceded by Volodymyr Bondarenko	Head of the Kyiv City; State Administration; 2014–present	Incumbent
