= Vitali Klitschko vs. Odlanier Solís =

Boxing match

Vitali Klitschko vs. Odlanier Solis
- Date: 19 March 2011
- Venue: Lanxess Arena, Cologne, Nordrhein-Westfalen, Germany
- Title(s) on the line: WBC Heavyweight Championship

Tale of the tape
Boxer	(Ukraine) Vitali Klitschko	(Cuba) Odlanier Solis
Nickname	"Dr. Ironfist"	"La Sombra"
Hometown	Kyiv, Kyiv Oblast, Ukraine	Havana, La Habana Province, Cuba
Purse	$15,000,000	$1,800,000
Pre-fight record	41–2 (38 KO)	17–0 (12 KO)
Age	39 years, 8 months	30 years, 11 months
Height	6 ft 8 in (203 cm)	6 ft 1 1/2 in (187 cm)
Weight	249 1/2 lb (113 kg)	247 lb (112 kg)
Style	Orthodox	Orthodox
Recognition	WBC; Heavyweight Champion; The Ring; No. 1 Ranked Heavyweight	WBC; No. 1 Ranked Heavyweight; The Ring; No. 10 Ranked Heavyweight

Result
- Klitschko defeated Solis by 1st round KO

Vitali Klitschko vs. Odlanier Solis was a professional boxing match contested on 19 March 2011, for the WBC heavyweight championship. It took place at Lanxess Arena, Cologne, Nordrhein-Westfalen, Germany.

== Background ==
Odlanier Solis became the mandatory heavyweight challenger for the WBC heavyweight title, after a 10-round DQ win against Ray Austin on 17 December 2010. The negotiations started out difficult. In the beginning, Odlanier Solis started out by demanding €1.5 million for the fight. On 11 January 2011, it was officially confirmed that the fight between Vitali Klitschko and Odlanier Solis was going to take place in Cologne, Germany on 19 March.

It was reported that Odlanier Solis earned $1.8 million for the fight (which at the time was €1.4 million). Vitali earned $15 million.

The first press conference of the fight was officially held in Cologne and both fighters and managers attended the press conference. At the press conference, neither fighter or promoter etc. spoke English, as there was no need to. Odlanier Solis does not speak English and Vitali Klitschko had no need to as the press conference and fight is in Germany.

There had been some trash talk up to the fight. Odlanier Solis has accused Vitali Klitschko for spreading rumors about him, that he is lazy, because of how he trains. Solis said that he is in perfect shape and ready to defeat Klitschko. Vitali Klitschko on the other hand said that he will get rid of Solis from the boxing world, after the challenger stated several times that he will defeat Klitschko, end his reign and send him to retirement. Klitschko had earlier said that he had fought some strong opponents, but never an Olympic gold medalist (which was inaccurate as he faced Lennox Lewis, who was an Olympic Gold Medalist). He also said that he expected a tough and close fight against a young and talented fighter. Solis' manager Ahmet Öner had also accused Vitali Klitschko for avoiding this fight for a long time.

The second press conference was held on March 14 in Cologne. The press conference was quiet and there were no trash talk at the conference, although they both promised a knockout.

Before the fight, there was also a public work-out held on 16 March at the Mercedes-Benz Center in Cologne.

Ticket sales for the fight started on January 26 on www.eventim.de. The prices for the fight started at €25. The official weigh-in for the fight took place in Cologne, Germany, on 18 March. It took place at Karstadt Sport Breite Straße. The official weight for the two fighters was as follows: Vitali Klitschko weighed in at 249.5 lbs., while Odlanier Solis weighed in at 247 lbs.

The supervisor for the fight was Charles Giles. The commissioner for the fight was the Bund Deutscher Berufsboxer and Tom Loeffler (K2 Promotions) was the promoter.

== The fight ==
Vitali Klitschko defeated Odlanier Solis in the first round. Solis went down near the end of the opening round, getting hit by a right hook to the temple. He immediately began grabbing his right knee upon attempting to get to his feet. He was able to make it to his feet. At that, the referee waved an end to the bout.

== Aftermath ==
After the fight, Solis was brought to Cologne's University Hospital, where it was confirmed that Solis suffered from a legitimate and serious knee injury. It was known that Solis had torn his cruciate ligament and damaged cartilage in the fall.

Solis promoter Ahmet Öner yelled and was very angry and frustrated after the fight. He showed up at the post-fight press conference, but only to give his opinion about Vitali Klitschko's manager, Bernard Bönte, whom he yelled and screamed at. Vitali Klitschko retained his WBC heavyweight title against Tomasz Adamek on 10 September in Poland, winning by TKO in the 10th round.

Odlanier Solis was set to make his comeback on November 25, 2011 in Trabzon, Turkey, but due to issues he was not able to leave the United States and his fight was taken off the card.

== Undercard ==
Confirmed bouts:

== International broadcasting ==
In Germany, the fight was broadcast live and exclusively on RTL Television.

Country	Broadcaster	HD (High Definition)
Australia	Main Event	
Brazil	ESPN Brasil	
Canada	Super Channel Fights	Super Channel HD 1
Croatia	Nova TV	
Denmark	TV 2 Sport	TV 2 Sport HD
France	Orange Sport	
Germany	RTL	RTL HD
Hungary	Digi Sport	
Israel	Sport 2	
Mexico	TV Azteca	
Philippines	TV5/IBC/Solar Sports	
Poland	TVP1 & TVP Sport	
Romania	Sport.ro	
Russia	REN TV	
Sweden	TV10	
Switzerland	RTL	RTL HD
Turkey	FOX Turkey	
Ukraine	Inter	
United Kingdom	Sky Sports 1	Sky Sports HD1
United States	Epix	Epix HD

Preceded by vs. Shannon Briggs	Vitali Klitschko's bouts 19 March 2011	Succeeded by vs. Tomasz Adamek
Preceded by vs. Ray Austin	Odlanier Solis's bouts 19 March 2011	Succeeded by vs. Konstantin Airich
