= Digi Sport =

Digi Sport is a Romanian sports television group which belongs to RCS & RDS:

- Digi Sport (Romania)
- Digi Sport (Hungary)
- Digi Sport (Slovakia)
