= Vitali Klitschko vs. Chris Byrd =

Boxing competition

- Date: 1 April 2000
- Venue: Estrel Convention Center, Neukölln, Berlin, Germany
- Title(s) on the line: WBO Heavyweight Championship

Tale of the tape
Boxer	(Ukraine) Vitali Klitschko	(United States) Chris Byrd
Nickname	"Dr. Ironfist"	"Rapid Fire"
Hometown	Kyiv, Ukraine	Flint, Michigan, US
Pre-fight record	27–0 (27 KO)	30–1 (18 KO)
Age	28 years, 8 months	29 years, 7 months
Height	6 ft 7 in (201 cm)	6 ft 1 1/2 in (187 cm)
Weight	244 1/4 lb (111 kg)	210 3/4 lb (96 kg)
Style	Orthodox	Southpaw
Recognition	WBO; Heavyweight Champion; The Ring; No. 7 Ranked Heavyweight	WBO; No. 10 Ranked Heavyweight

Result
- Byrd defeated Klitschko via 9th round corner retirement

Vitali Klitschko vs. Chris Byrd, was a professional boxing match contested on 1 April 2000 for the WBO Heavyweight Championship.

== Background ==
After knocking out Herbie Hide to win the WBO belt, Vitali Klitschko had made two stoppage defences against Ed Mahone, and Obed Sullivan. He was ranked 7th in the world by Ring magazine. He had planned to face Donovan Ruddock, however, he pulled out due to a hepatitis infection and Chris Byrd (who had been training for a bout with Lawrence Clay-Bey) stepped in at 10 days notice to take the fight.

== The fight ==
Klitschko controlled most of the fight with Byrd being elusive and making himself a difficult target. After 9 rounds Vitali had suffered a torn rotator cuff and despite being clearly ahead on the scorecards (88–83, 88–83, & 89–82) he retired on his stool handing the win to Byrd. Harold Lederman, HBO's unofficial judge, had Klitschko ahead 88–83 at the time of the stoppage.

== Aftermath ==
Vitali's status as a rising star of the Heavyweight division took a knock after this with HBO commentator Larry Merchant saying, "He doesn’t have the mentality of a champion. I can hardly believe what I just saw." Byrd's first defence in October was against the WBO's top contender, and Vitali's younger brother Wladimir Klitschko, who avenged his brother's loss with a clear decision victory.

== Undercard ==
Confirmed bouts:

== Broadcasting ==
Country	Broadcaster
Germany	Sat.1
United States	HBO

Preceded by vs. Obed Sullivan	Vitali Klitschko' bouts 1 April 2000	Succeeded by vs. Timo Hoffmann
Preceded by vs. David Washington	Chris Byrd's bouts 1 April 2000	Succeeded by vs. Wladimir Klitschko
