= Vitali Klitschko vs. Tomasz Adamek =

Boxing match

Walka XXI Wieku!
- Date: 10 September 2011
- Venue: Stadion Miejski, Wrocław, Lower Silesian, Poland
- Title(s) on the line: WBC heavyweight title

Tale of the tape
Boxer	Vitali Klitschko	Tomasz Adamek
Nickname	"Dr. Ironfist"	"Góral"
Hometown	Kyiv, Kyiv Oblast, Ukraine	Zywiec, Silesia, Poland
Pre-fight record	42–2 (39 KO)	44–1 (28 KO)
Age	40 years, 1 month	34 years, 9 months
Height	6 ft 7 in (201 cm)	6 ft 2 1/2 in (189 cm)
Weight	243 lb (110 kg)	216 lb (98 kg)
Style	Orthodox	Orthodox
Recognition	WBC; Heavyweight Champion; The Ring; No. 1 Ranked Heavyweight	WBC; No. 1 Ranked Heavyweight; The Ring; No. 2 Ranked Heavyweight; 2-division world champion

Result
- Klitschko wins via 10th-round TKO

Vitali Klitschko vs. Tomasz Adamek, billed as Walka XXI Wieku! (English: The Fight of the 21st Century!), was a heavyweight bout for the WBC heavyweight championship. The fight took place at the Stadion Miejski in Wrocław, Lower Silesian, Poland on September 10, 2011, and was televised via HBO World Championship Boxing. As a part of a split-site doubleheader, the broadcast also featured the Yuriorkis Gamboa vs. Daniel Ponce de León bout taking place at the Boardwalk Hall in Atlantic City, New Jersey, United States. In Poland, the bout was available on Cyfra+ pay-per-view platform, making it the first PPV fight in Polish television history.

== Background ==
Klitschko, expected to dominate, said he would knock out his opponent, who he said had "only grown into the division by eating like a heavyweight". Fritz Sdunek, Klitschko's coach, said his fighter would retire after two or three more fights.

== The fight ==
Klitschko dominated the fight winning every round on the three scorecards before referee Massimo Barrovecchio stepped in 2 minutes, 20 seconds into the tenth round.

== Aftermath ==
Klitschko would make his next defence against Derek Chisora the following February.

== Undercard ==
Confirmed bouts:

Weight Class		vs.		Method	Round	Time	Notes
Heavyweight	(Ukraine) Vitali Klitschko	def.	(Poland) Tomasz Adamek	TKO	10/12	2:20	WBC Heavyweight title
Cruiserweight	(United Kingdom) Ola Afolabi	def.	(Poland) Łukasz Rusiewicz	UD	8	—
Heavyweight	(United States) Johnathon Banks	def.	(Croatia) Ivica Bacurin	KO	6/8	2:59
Cruiserweight	(Poland) Mateusz Masternak	def.	(United States) Carl Davis	TKO	3/10	2:46
Heavyweight	(Poland) Andrzej Wawrzyk	def.	(United States) Devin Vargas	TKO	9/10	1:40
Welterweight	(United States) Sadam Ali	def.	(Germany) Boris Berg	RTD	6/6	3:00
Super Middleweight	(Poland) Mariusz Cendrowski	def.	(Estonia) Anton Sjomkin	UD	4	—

== Broadcasting ==
Country	Broadcaster
Brazil	ESPN Brasil
Belgium	Sporting Telenet
Canada	HBO Canada
Denmark	TV2 Sport
Germany	RTL Television
Italy	Sportitalia
Poland	PPV
Portugal	Sporttv
Romania	Pro TV
Ukraine	Inter
United Kingdom	Sky Sports 3
USA	HBO

Preceded by vs. Odlanier Solís	Vitali Klitschko's bouts 10 September 2011	Succeeded by vs. Derek Chisora
Preceded by vs. Kevin McBride	Tomasz Adamek's bouts 10 September 2011	Succeeded by vs. Nagy Aguilera
