= Herbie Hide =

Nigerian and British boxer

Personal information
- Nickname: The Dancing Destroyer
- Nationality: British
- Born: Herbert Okechukwu Maduagwu; 27 August 1971 (age 55) Amauzari, Imo state, Nigeria
- Height: 6 ft 2 in (188 cm)
- Weight: Cruiserweight; Heavyweight

Boxing career
- Reach: 75 in (191 cm)
- Stance: Orthodox

Boxing record
- Total fights: 53
- Wins: 49
- Win by KO: 43
- Losses: 4

Herbie Hide (born Herbert Okechukwu Maduagwu; 27 August 1971) is a British former professional boxer who competed from 1989 to 2010. He held the WBO heavyweight world title twice between 1994 and 1999, as well as the British heavyweight title in 1993. Hide was known for his formidable punching power and good instinct in the ring.

== Early life ==
Hide was born in Amauzari, Nigeria, and moved to England as a youngster, basing himself near Norwich in Norfolk. He was educated at Glebe House School and Cawston College.

== Amateur career ==
Hide had a brief amateur career of 10 fights, which he finished with a record of 8 wins (7 KOs), 2 losses.

=== Highlights ===
(silver) 1989 ABA Championships, heavyweight:

- 1/8: Defeated M. Brown on points
- 1/4: Defeated N. Smith RSC 1
- 1/2: Defeated Denzill Browne RSC 3
- Finals: Lost to Henry Akinwande on points

== Professional career ==
Herbie Hide fought for most of his professional boxing career as a heavyweight; but later in his career, decided to go down to the lighter cruiserweight division . He was known as The Dancing Destroyer, and had a successful career, rising to domestic success at a very young age for a heavyweight. Hide was twice the World Boxing Organization (WBO) world heavyweight champion.

Hide's professional career began in 1989 with a second round win, and he racked up a total of 25 successive wins, all but one inside the distance. His level of opposition was respectable, and included fighters such as Jeff Lampkin and James Pritchard.

At 25 wins to 0 losses (24 from knockout (KO)), Hide challenged Michael Bentt for the WBO heavyweight title in March 1994 at Millwall Football Stadium, Millwall, London. The inexperienced Bentt had previously won the title by knocking out the heavily favoured Tommy Morrison in one round. The Hide vs Bentt fight made headlines after the two boxers scuffled and threw punches at a pre-fight meeting; whilst in the bout itself, Hide out-boxed and knocked out Bentt in 7 rounds. Bentt was subsequently hospitalised, and never fought again.

A year later, Hide defended his WBO heavyweight title against former undisputed champion Riddick Bowe. Hide used his speed to out-box Bowe early on, and managed to hurt Bowe several times during the contest. However Bowe's size and class eventually told, and Hide was floored six times during the bout. Hide impressed with his courage, repeatedly picking himself off the canvas, before he was knocked out in the sixth round.

After his loss to Bowe, Hide fought twice in 1996, winning both by knockout (KO) against Michael Murray and Frankie Swindell, before earning another shot at the now-vacant WBO title in June 1997 against 38-year-old one-time International Boxing Federation (IBF) title holder Tony Tucker, despite Tucker losing three of his previous five fights. Hide knocked out the overweight Tucker in two rounds. Hide defended his WBO title twice in 1998; with quick stoppages of late replacement cruiserweight clubfighter Damon Reed, and in September 1998 against German Willi Fischer.

In June 1999, Hide faced the 6 ft 8in Ukrainian Vitali Klitschko at the London Arena, only the second world ranked fighter he had actually faced after Riddick Bowe. Hide, favoured to win at the time, was knocked out in two rounds.

Hide never featured as a main contender at heavyweight again, his only mildly notable wins coming against Joseph Chingangu (who also knocked Hide out in one of Hide's many comebacks), and Alexander Vasiliev.

In 2006, Hide moved down in weight to a more natural division at cruiserweight. Since then, he has won fourteen successive fights, most of which took place in Germany. Hide defeated Mikhail Nasyrov in December 2007 to win the World Boxing Council (WBC) International cruiserweight title.

In November 2008, when Johnathon Banks dropped out of a WBO cruiserweight title clash at London's ExCel Arena with just four days notice, Hide was announced as a potential opponent for former champion Enzo Maccarinelli, for the vacant title. This was despite Hide having fought just two weeks earlier, a victory against Lukasz Rusiewicz. Hide then fought in the Cruiserweight Prizefighter tournament. In the tournament, he defeated Welshman Wayne Brooks by unanimous decision, but was badly cut on the right eye in the process. He pulled out of the tournament to avoid losing his high WBC ranking due to the cut.

== Personal life ==
In December 2003, Hide was 'attacked by a group of men' in a Norwich night club. This resulted in his subsequent arrest and conviction for 'possession of an offensive weapon, a 10-inch kitchen knife', for which he was fined £750.

In September 2008, Hide was warned by Norwich Magistrates that he faced 75 days in jail if £3,767 of outstanding motoring fines were not paid by 30 November 2008. During a television interview in July 2008, Hide claimed that promoter Frank Warren "had dishonestly and corruptly bribed Johnny Nelson to retire and give up his WBO cruiserweight title". When Warren sued for libel, Hide failed to respond and a default judgment of £35,000 was entered against him.

Hide appeared at Norwich Crown Court, charged with rape, but was found not guilty on 20 July 2011 after 'the prosecution offered no evidence'.

On 18 March 2012, a man in his 20s was fatally stabbed at Hide's home in Bawburgh. A suspect was arrested for murder in connection with the incident. Police said they believed Hide was not home at the time of the killing.

On 29 November 2013, Hide was sentenced to 22 months in prison for conspiracy to supply cocaine. He was targeted by the so-called 'fake sheikh' also known as Mazher Mahmood, an undercover News of the World reporter. After an initial refusal, Hide relented, and agreed to contact a drug dealer of his acquaintance to procure the drug. When he delivered the drug to the undercover reporter he was arrested and charged.

== Professional boxing record ==
53 fights	49 wins	4 losses
By knockout	43	4
By decision	6	0

No.	Result	Record	Opponent	Type	Round, time	Date	Location	Notes
53	Win	49–4	Wayne Brooks	UD	3	30 Apr 2010	York Hall, London, England	Prizefighter 11: cruiserweight quarter-final
52	Win	48–4	Gabor Halasz	TKO	3 (4), 2:23	26 Jun 2009	Hermann-Neuberger-Halle, Völklingen, Germany	
51	Win	47–4	Sandro Siproshvili	UD	8	6 Mar 2009	Kugelbake-Halle, Cuxhaven, Germany	
50	Win	46–4	Lukasz Rusiewicz	UD	6	18 Nov 2008	Kugelbake-Halle, Cuxhaven, Germany	
49	Win	45–4	Aleksejs Kosobokovs	RTD	3 (8), 3:00	4 Oct 2008	Norfolk Showground, Norwich, England	
48	Win	44–4	Nuri Seferi	UD	12	4 Jul 2008	Büyük Anadolu Termal Hotel, Ankara, Turkey	Retained WBC International cruiserweight title
47	Win	43–4	Ehinomen Ehikhamenor	UD	12	30 May 2008	Pabellón Lasesarre, Baracaldo, Spain	Retained WBC International cruiserweight title
46	Win	42–4	Rüdiger May	TKO	2 (12), 1:47	11 Mar 2008	Maritim Hotel, Halle, Germany	Retained WBC International cruiserweight title
45	Win	41–4	Mikhail Nasyrov	TKO	6 (12), 1:30	23 Dec 2007	Maritim Hotel, Halle, Germany	Won vacant WBC International cruiserweight title
44	Win	40–4	Mircea Telecan	TKO	1 (8), 1:16	21 Sep 2007	Hansehalle, Lübeck, Germany	
43	Win	39–4	Aleh Dubiaha	KO	1 (8), 1:23	16 Jun 2007	Atatürk Sport Hall, Ankara, Turkey	
42	Win	38–4	Pavol Polakovic	KO	6 (8), 1:30	27 Apr 2007	Arena Gym, Hamburg, Germany	
41	Win	37–4	Valeri Semiskur	KO	1 (6), 2:35	24 Mar 2007	Alsterdorfer Sporthalle, Hamburg, Germany	
40	Win	36–4	Mitch Hicks	TKO	1 (4), 1:24	23 Sep 2006	Convention Center, Fort Smith, Arkansas, US	
39	Loss	35–4	Mindaugas Kulikauskas	RTD	3 (8), 3:00	12 Mar 2004	Nottingham Arena, Nottingham, England	
38	Win	35–3	Alexander Vasiliev	TKO	5 (10), 1:15	4 Oct 2003	Alexandra Palace, London, England	
37	Win	34–3	Joseph Chingangu	KO	1 (8), 2:33	27 May 2003	Goresbrook Leisure Centre, London, England	
36	Win	33–3	Derek McCafferty	TKO	7 (8), 1:27	16 Apr 2003	Nottingham Arena, Nottingham, England	
35	Loss	32–3	Joseph Chingangu	TKO	2 (8)	22 Sep 2001	Telewest Arena, Newcastle, England	
34	Win	32–2	Alexey Osokin	TKO	3 (8), 1:31	14 Jul 2001	Liverpool Olympia, Liverpool, England	
33	Loss	31–2	Vitali Klitschko	KO	2 (12), 1:14	26 Jun 1999	London Arena, London, England	Lost WBO heavyweight title
32	Win	31–1	Wilhelm Fischer	TKO	2 (12), 1:04	26 Sep 1998	Sports Village, Norwich, England	Retained WBO heavyweight title
31	Win	30–1	Damon Reed	TKO	1 (12), 0:52	18 Apr 1998	NYNEX Arena, Manchester, England	Retained WBO heavyweight title
30	Win	29–1	Tony Tucker	TKO	2 (12), 2:45	28 Jun 1997	Sports Village, Norwich, England	Won vacant WBO heavyweight title
29	Win	28–1	Frankie Swindell	KO	1 (8)	9 Nov 1996	NYNEX Arena, Manchester, England	
28	Win	27–1	Michael Murray	TKO	6 (10)	6 Jul 1996	NYNEX Arena, Manchester, England	
27	Loss	26–1	Riddick Bowe	KO	6 (12), 2:25	11 Mar 1995	MGM Grand Garden Arena, Paradise, Nevada, US	Lost WBO heavyweight title
26	Win	26–0	Michael Bentt	KO	7 (12), 2:50	19 Mar 1994	The Den, London, England	Won WBO heavyweight title
25	Win	25–0	Jeff Lampkin	TKO	2 (12)	4 Dec 1993	Superbowl, Sun City, South Africa	WBC International heavyweight title
24	Win	24–0	Mike Dixon	TKO	9 (12)	6 Nov 1993	York Hall, London, England	Won vacant WBC International heavyweight title
23	Win	23–0	Everett Martin	PTS	10	18 Sep 1993	Granby Halls, Leicester, England	
22	Win	22–0	Jerry Halstead	TKO	4 (12)	11 May 1993	Sports Village, Norwich, England	Won vacant World Boxing Board heavyweight title
21	Win	21–0	Michael Murray	TKO	5 (12)	27 Feb 1993	Goresbrook Leisure Centre, London, England	Won vacant British heavyweight title
20	Win	20–0	Juan Antonio Diaz	TKO	3 (10), 1:32	30 Jan 1993	International Centre, Brentwood, England	Won vacant WBA Pentacontinental heavyweight title
19	Win	19–0	James Pritchard	TKO	2 (10)	12 Dec 1992	Alexandra Palace, London, England	
18	Win	18–0	Craig Petersen	TKO	6 (12)	6 Oct 1992	Sportpaleis, Antwerp, Belgium	Retained WBC International heavyweight title
17	Win	17–0	Jean Chanet	TKO	8 (10)	8 Sep 1992	Sports Village, Norwich, England	
16	Win	16–0	Percell Davis	KO	1 (10)	3 Mar 1992	Jaap Edenhal, Amsterdam, Netherlands	
15	Win	15–0	Conroy Nelson	TKO	2 (12), 0:35	21 Jan 1992	Sports Village, Norwich, England	Won vacant WBC International heavyweight title
14	Win	14–0	Chris Jacobs	KO	1 (10), 2:28	29 Oct 1991	STAR Centre, Cardiff, Wales	
13	Win	13–0	Eddie Gonzales	KO	2 (10)	15 Oct 1991	Hamburg, Germany	
12	Win	12–0	Tucker Richards	TKO	3 (8), 2:50	3 Jul 1991	International Centre, Brentwood, England	
11	Win	11–0	John Westgarth	TKO	4 (8)	14 May 1991	Town Hall, Dudley, England	
10	Win	10–0	David Jules	TKO	1 (8)	9 Apr 1991	Grosvenor House Hotel, London, England	
9	Win	9–0	Lennie Howard	TKO	1 (10)	29 Jan 1991	Hudsons Sports Centre, Wisbech, England	
8	Win	8–0	Steve Lewsam	TKO	1 (6), 2:28	18 Nov 1990	National Exhibition Centre, Birmingham, England	
7	Win	7–0	Gus Mendes	KO	2 (6)	17 Oct 1990	York Hall, London, England	
6	Win	6–0	Jonjo Greene	TKO	1 (8)	26 Sep 1990	Bowlers Exhibition Centre, Manchester, England	
5	Win	5–0	Steve Lewsam	TKO	4 (6), 1:40	5 Sep 1990	Brighton Centre, Brighton, England	
4	Win	4–0	Alex Penarski	TKO	3 (6), 2:18	27 Jun 1990	Royal Albert Hall, London, England	
3	Win	3–0	Steve Osborne	TKO	6 (6)	19 Dec 1989	York Hall, London, England	
2	Win	2–0	Gary McCrory	TKO	1 (6)	5 Nov 1989	Royal Albert Hall, London, England	
1	Win	1–0	Lee Williams	KO	2 (6)	24 Oct 1989	York Hall, London, England	

Sporting positions
Regional boxing titles
Vacant Title last held by Jimmy Thunder	WBC International heavyweight champion 21 January 1992 – January 1993; Vacated	Vacant Title next held by James Oyebola
Vacant Title last held by Lennox Lewis	British heavyweight champion 27 February 1993 – 19 March 1994; Won WBO title	Vacant Title next held by James Oyebola
Vacant Title last held by James Oyebola	WBC International heavyweight champion 6 November 1993 – March 1994; Vacated	Vacant Title next held by James Oyebola
Vacant Title last held by Rudolf Kraj	WBC International cruiserweight champion 23 December 2007 – October 2008; Vacated	Vacant Title next held by Silvio Branco
Minor world boxing titles
New title	World Boxing Board heavyweight champion 11 May 1993 – November 1993; Vacated	Vacant Title next held by Cesar Rendon
Major world boxing titles
Preceded by Michael Bentt	WBO heavyweight champion 19 March 1994 – 11 March 1995	Succeeded by Riddick Bowe
Vacant Title last held by Henry Akinwande	WBO heavyweight champion 28 June 1997 – 26 June 1999	Succeeded by Vitali Klitschko
