= Digi Sport (Hungary) =

- Country: Hungary
- Headquarters: Budapest

Ownership
- Owner: Antenna Hungária (4iG (80%))
- Sister channels: Digi Sport 1 Digi Sport 2 Digi Sport 3

History
- Launched: 23 July 2009; 16 years ago
- Closed: 5 August 2022; 3 years ago
- Replaced by: Match4 and Arèna4

Links
- Website: digisport.hu (closed)

Digi Sport was a Hungarian sports television network that was launched on 23 July 2009, available only on the Digi TV platform. It is offered as a set of three channels, called Digi Sport 1, Digi Sport 2, Digi Sport 3.

On 2 August 2019, the redesigned 2012 logo began to be used on air and the current font is the Roboto typeface. Later it got adopted to the Romanian version, but it was adopted to the Hungarian version a few months later. The outros, screen-bug and the idents have been modified.

In June 2022 Digi Hungary owner 4iG publicly announced that they will close down their channels, with Digi Sport being the first to shut down on August 5, and the rest of the channels on September 1.

== Football ==
- Serie A (until 2021)
- Ligue 1 (until 2021)
- UEFA Europa League (until 2021)
- UEFA Europa Conference League (until 2022)
- Premier League (until 2022) (shared with Spíler Tv)
- Turkish Süper Lig (until 2019)
- Copa del Rey

== Basketball ==
- EuroLeague (until 2021)

== Ice hockey ==
- Erste Bank Liga (until 2019)

== Tennis ==
- ATP Finals
- ATP Tour Masters 1000
- ATP Tour 500
- ATP Tour 250
- WTA Tour
