= Wilhelm Fischer (boxer) =

German boxer (born 1972)

Willi Fischer
Personal information
- Nationality: German
- Born: Wilhelm Fischer; 26 August 1972 (age 54) Frankfurt, Hessen, West Germany
- Height: 6 ft 3 in (191 cm)

Boxing career
- Weight class: Heavyweight
- Reach: 75 in (191 cm)
- Stance: Orthodox

Boxing record
- Total fights: 44
- Wins: 37
- Win by KO: 24
- Losses: 6

Wilhelm "Willi" Fischer (born 26 August 1972, in Frankfurt am Main) is a German former professional boxer. As an amateur he competed at the 1992 Summer Olympics. He challenged once for the WBO heavyweight world title in 1998. He retired with a record of 37 wins (24 by knockout), 6 losses, and 1 draw.

== Professional career ==
Fischer made his professional debut in July 1995, a draw. He soon amassed a record of 11-0-1 and captured the German International Heavyweight title, before facing then 17–0 fellow German Kim Weber in October 1996, in a battle for Fischer's international German as well as the vacant Germany BDB Heavyweight title. Fischer lost via unanimous decision.

Fischer would bounce back however, winning his next 10 fights to amass a 21–1–1 record. He was then awarded a title shot for the WBO heavyweight world title in September 1998 against then-champion Herbie Hide. Fischer lost via a second round TKO.

Fischer won his next four before facing Kim Weber in a rematch for the German International (BDB) Heavyweight title, winning via majority decision. Fischer was then set to fight Timo Hoffmann for both Fischer's title and Hoffman's Germany BDB Heavyweight title in May 2000. Fischer lost via unanimous decision. After also dropping his next fight to 9-0 Rene Monse for the vacant International BDB title, Fischer would go 11–2 in his last 13 fights, the pair of losses being in bouts for the Germany BDB Heavyweight titles in 2003 and 2004. Fischer retired in 2009.

== Professional boxing record ==
44 fights	37 wins	6 losses
By knockout	24	1
By decision	13	5
Draws	1	

No.	Result	Record	Opponent	Type	Round, time	Date	Location	Notes
44	Win	37–6–1	(Germany) Werner Kreiskott	RTD	4 (6), 3:00	2009-06-06	Eissporthalle, Neuwied, Germany	
43	Win	36–6–1	(Latvia) Edgars Kalnars	KO	4 (8), 2:36	2008-12-13	SAP Arena, Mannheim, Germany	
42	Win	35–6–1	(Czech Republic) Tomas Mrazek	PTS	6	2008-02-16	de Voltreffer, Nieuwegein, Netherlands	
41	Win	34–6–1	(Latvia) Aleksejs Kosobokovs	PTS	8	2007-09-21	Hansehalle, Lübeck, Germany	
40	Win	33–6–1	(Ukraine) Oleksandr Mileiko	UD	6	2007-07-06	Arena Gym, Hamburg, Germany	
39	Win	32–6–1	(Slovakia) Vlado Szabo	PTS	4	2005-07-02	Karl Eckel Halle, Hattersheim am Main, Germany	
38	Loss	31–6–1	(Germany) Andreas Sidon	UD	10	2004-10-09	Fernwald-Halle, Fernwald, Germany	For Germany BDB heavyweight title.
37	Loss	31–5–1	(Germany) Andreas Sidon	DQ	10	2003-06-14	Bordelandhalle, Magdeburg, Germany	For Germany BDB heavyweight title. Originally win for Fischer (UD 10); overturned after he tested positive for marijuana post-fight.
36	Win	31–4–1	(Germany) Gene Pukall	TKO	2 (6)	2003-05-24	Karl Eckel Halle, Hattersheim am Main, Germany	
35	Win	30–4–1	(Romania) Costel Patriche	TKO	5 (8)	2003-04-05	Leipzig Arena, Leipzig, Germany	
34	Win	29–4–1	(United States) Ken Murphy	TKO	4 (8)	2003-02-01	Chemnitz Arena, Chemnitz, Germany	
33	Win	28–4–1	(Poland) Piotr Jurczyk	TKO	3 (6)	2002-09-28	Stadthalle, Zwickau, Germany	
32	Win	27–4–1	(Kenya) Joseph Akhasamba	UD	12	2001-09-29	Stadthalle Offenbach, Offenbach, Germany	Won World Boxing Board heavyweight title.
31	Loss	26–4–1	(Germany) René Monse	MD	10	2000-09-02	Bordelandhalle, Magdeburg, Germany	For vacant German International BDB heavyweight title. Fischer tested positive for marijuana and anabolic steroids post-fight.
30	Loss	26–3–1	(Germany) Timo Hoffmann	UD	12	2000-05-06	Ballsporthalle Frankfurt, Frankfurt, Germany	European heavyweight title eliminator. For German BDB heavyweight title. Lost German International BDB heavyweight title.
29	Win	26–2–1	(Germany) Kim Weber	MD	10	1999-10-23	Ballsporthalle Frankfurt, Frankfurt, Germany	Retained German International BDB heavyweight title.
28	Win	25–2–1	(Russia) Alexey Osokin	TKO	5 (8)	1999-08-28	Stadthalle Bremen, Bremen, Germany	
27	Win	24–2–1	(United Kingdom) Michael Murray	PTS	8	1999-06-05	Ballsporthalle Frankfurt, Frankfurt, Germany	
26	Win	23–2–1	(United States) Everett Martin	UD	8	1999-02-13	Maritim Hotel, Stuttgart, Germany	
25	Win	22–2–1	(United States) Jason Yarosz	TKO	2 (8)	1998-12-12	Ballsporthalle Frankfurt, Frankfurt, Germany	
24	Loss	21–2–1	(United Kingdom) Herbie Hide	TKO	2 (12)	1998-09-26	(United Kingdom) Sports Village, Norwich, England	For WBO heavyweight title.
23	Win	21–1–1	(Armenia) Gurgen Sugiasian	TKO	4 (10)	1998-05-23	Oberrheinhalle, Offenburg, Germany	Retained German International BDB heavyweight title.
22	Win	20–1–1	(United States) Tim Knight	KO	6 (8)	1998-03-20	Ballsporthalle Frankfurt, Frankfurt, Germany	
21	Win	19–1–1	(Uzbekistan) Furkat Tursunov	PTS	10	1998-01-30	Berdux Filmstudios, Munich, Germany	Retained German International BDB heavyweight title.
20	Win	18–1–1	(United States) Doug Liggion	PTS	8	1997-12-20	Oberrheinhalle, Offenburg, Germany	
19	Win	17–1–1	(Germany) Mario Schiesser	UD	10	1997-11-08	Ballsporthalle Frankfurt, Frankfurt, Germany	Won German International BDB heavyweight title.
18	Win	16–1–1	(United States) Tony LaRosa	PTS	8	1997-08-23	Maritim Hotel, Stuttgart, Germany	
17	Win	15–1–1	(United States) Vincent Boulware	TKO	2 (?)	1997-07-12	Berlethalle, Hagen, Germany	
16	Win	14–1–1	(France) Christophe Bizot	KO	7 (12)	1997-05-10	Ballsporthalle Frankfurt, Frankfurt, Germany	Won vacant WBO Inter-Continental heavyweight title.
15	Win	13–1–1	(France) Joel Heinrich	KO	1 (?)	1996-12-21	Zoo-Gesellschaftshaus, Frankfurt, Germany	
14	Win	12–1–1	(Austria) Biko Botowamungu	DQ	7 (8)	1996-12-07	Vienna, Austria	
13	Loss	11–1–1	(Germany) Kim Weber	UD	10	1996-10-05	Sartory-Saal, Cologne, Germany	For vacant Germany BDB heavyweight title. Lost German International BDB heavyweight title.
12	Win	11–0–1	(United Kingdom) Shane Woollas	KO	2 (8)	1996-08-31	Plaza de Toros del Coliseo Balear, Palma de Mallorca, Spain	
11	Win	10–0–1	(Germany) Mario Nesemann	KO	1 (?)	1996-08-17	Zoo-Gesellschaftshaus, Frankfurt, Germany	
10	Win	9–0–1	(Turkey) Serdar Uysal	KO	3 (10)	1996-07-06	Zoo-Gesellschaftshaus, Frankfurt, Germany	Retained German International BDB heavyweight title.
9	Win	8–0–1	(United States) Kimmuel Odum	KO	2 (?), 0:15	22 Jun 1996	Westfalenstadion, Dortmund, Germany	
8	Win	7–0–1	(United States) Brian Morgan	KO	3 (?)	1996-05-25	Neue Messehallen, Leipzig, Germany	
7	Win	6–0–1	(Hungary) Laszlo Paszterko	TKO	5 (10)	1996-05-04	Zoo-Gesellschaftshaus, Frankfurt, Germany	Won vacant German International BDB heavyweight title.
6	Win	5–0–1	(Czech Republic) Jan Sztojka	TKO	1 (?)	1996-03-01	Zoo-Gesellschaftshaus, Frankfurt, Germany	
5	Win	4–0–1	(France) Phillipe Houyvet	KO	4 (4)	1995-12-09	Hanns-Martin-Schleyer-Halle, Stuttgart, Germany	
4	Win	3–0–1	(United States) Leonard Cook	KO	2 (6), 1:30	1995-11-03	Zoo-Gesellschaftshaus, Frankfurt, Germany	
3	Win	2–0–1	(United Kingdom) Joey Paladino	KO	2 (4), 2:16	1995-10-14	Olympiahalle, Munich, Germany	
2	Win	1–0–1	(Slovakia) Ludomir Dubac	KO	1 (4)	1995-09-08	Zoo-Gesellschaftshaus, Frankfurt, Germany	
1	Draw	0–0–1	(Turkey) Serdar Uysal	PTS	4	1995-07-08	Zoo-Gesellschaftshaus, Frankfurt, Germany	Professional debut.
