= Evander Holyfield vs. Lennox Lewis =

Boxing competition

Undisputed
- Date: March 13, 1999
- Venue: Madison Square Garden, New York City, New York, U.S.
- Title(s) on the line: WBA, WBC and IBF undisputed heavyweight championship

Tale of the tape
Boxer	Evander Holyfield	Lennox Lewis
Nickname	The Real Deal	The Lion
Hometown	Atlanta, Georgia, U.S.	London, England
Purse	$20,000,000	$10,000,000
Pre-fight record	36–3 (25 KO)	34–1 (27 KO)
Age	36 years, 4 months	33 years, 6 months
Height	6 ft 2 1/2 in (189 cm)	6 ft 5 in (196 cm)
Weight	215 lb (98 kg)	246 lb (112 kg)
Style	Orthodox	Orthodox
Recognition	WBA and IBF; Heavyweight Champion; The Ring pound-for-pound No. 3 ranked fighter 2-division undisputed world champion	WBC; Heavyweight Champion

Result
- 12–round split draw (115-113, 115-115, 113-116)

Evander Holyfield vs. Lennox Lewis, billed as Undisputed, was a professional boxing match contested on March 13, 1999 for the WBA, WBC, and IBF undisputed heavyweight championship.

== Background ==
After Riddick Bowe defeated Evander Holyfield to become the undisputed heavyweight champion, the WBC ordered Bowe to face its top contender, the undefeated Lennox Lewis. Bowe, however, refused to meet Lewis' financial demands and vacated the title. The WBC therefore named Lewis its heavyweight champion. Holyfield regained the WBA, IBF and lineal heavyweight titles in a rematch with Bowe, but then lost the titles in his first defense against southpaw Michael Moorer. Shortly after, Lewis lost his WBC heavyweight title to Oliver McCall, putting a Holyfield–Lewis unification bout on hold for several years. By 1996, the three major heavyweight titles were separated, partly due to the IBF and WBA stripping George Foreman of their heavyweight titles, though he continued to be recognized as the lineal heavyweight champion. Meanwhile, Bruce Seldon defeated Tony Tucker to win the vacant WBA title, while Moorer regained the vacant IBF Heavyweight title he had lost to Foreman by defeating Axel Schulz. Mike Tyson then defeated Frank Bruno to capture the WBC heavyweight title. Tyson then challenged and defeated Seldon to win the WBA heavyweight title (the WBC title was not at stake in that fight), setting the stages for a Tyson–Holyfield match in which Holyfield won the WBA title. Next for Holyfield was a victory against Moorer in a rematch unified the WBA and IBF heavyweight titles. Tyson chose to vacate the WBC heavyweight title rather than face Lewis, preferring to face Holyfield as it was a more lucrative fight. Lewis recaptured the vacant WBC title by defeating McCall and then defeated lineal champion Shannon Briggs. After Holyfield and Lewis made their mandatory defenses against Vaughn Bean and Željko Mavrović respectively, the two men met for the undisputed heavyweight championship. Lewis had hired Holyfield's former trainer Emanuel Steward following his shock defeat to McCall (who Steward had also trained). Meanwhile, the normally mild-mannered Holyfield uncharacteristically predicted that he would dominate the first two rounds before knocking out Lewis in the third.

== The fight ==
Despite Holyfield's claims, it was Lewis who dominated the early portion of the fight, easily winning the first two rounds on the judges' scorecards. In the second round, Lewis landed 42 of his 87 punches, while Holyfield only landed eight of his 24 punches. Despite Lewis' early dominance, an unfazed Holyfield told his corner that "this is the round he go out", referring to his third round knockout prediction. Holyfield began round three aggressively, hitting Lewis with several combinations in the first two minutes. With 1:23 left in the round, Holyfield threw a powerful haymaker that Lewis dodged.

Though Holyfield won round three, he fell short of his knockout prediction. Lewis came back to win round four, giving him a 3-rounds-to-1 lead. Lewis expanded his lead by dominating round five, landing 75% of his 57 punches while limiting Holyfield to just 11 landed punches.

Lewis got into trouble in round six after he dropped his hands to his side, allowing Holyfield to connect with a right–left combination. Two of the judges scored the round in favor of Holyfield. Lewis won round seven, stunning Holyfield with a left jab in the first minute and later having Holyfield against the ropes. In the second minute of the round, Lewis hit Holyfield with right uppercut–left hand–right hand combination.

Holyfield only landed eight punches to Lewis' 33 in the round. Holyfield fought back by winning rounds 8 through 11 on two of the three judges' scorecards, with judge Larry O'Connell scoring round 10 a draw. Lewis finished the fight strongly, winning round 12 on all three of the judges' scorecards.

With the decision now up to the judges, television commentators expected Lewis to become the first undisputed heavyweight champion since 1992. However, in one of the most controversial decisions in boxing history, the fight was ruled a split draw. Judge Stanley Christodoulou named Lewis the winner by the score of 116–113, Eugenia Williams scored the fight in favor of Holyfield 115–113 and Larry O'Connell called the fight a draw at 115–115. HBO's Harold Lederman had the bout scored 117-111 for Lewis as did the AP.

The referee officiating the fight was Arthur Mercante Jr.

=== Main event scorecards ===
New York State Athletic Commission Official score card
Title: Undisputed					Referee: Arthur Mercante Jr					Supervisor:				
Date: 13 March 1999					Venue: Madison Square Garden					Promoter: Don King				
Lewis		vs.	Holyfield		Lewis		vs.	Holyfield		Lewis		vs.	Holyfield	
RS	TS	Rd	TS	RS	RS	TS	Rd	TS	RS	RS	TS	Rd	TS	RS
10		1		9	10		1		9	10		1		9
10	20	2	18	9	10	20	2	18	9	10	20	2	18	9
9	29	3	28	10	9	29	3	28	10	9	29	3	28	10
10	39	4	37	9	9	38	4	38	10	10	39	4	37	9
10	49	5	46	9	9	47	5	48	10	10	49	5	46	9
10	59	6	55	9	10	57	6	57	9	9	58	6	56	10
10	69	7	64	9	10	67	7	66	9	10	68	7	66	10
9	78	8	74	10	9	76	8	76	10	9	77	8	76	10
9	87	9	84	10	9	85	9	86	10	9	86	9	86	10
9	96	10	94	10	9	94	10	96	10	10	96	10	96	10
10	106	11	104	10	9	103	11	106	10	9	105	11	106	10
10	116	12	113	9	10	113	12	115	9	10	115	12	115	9
FINAL SCORE	116	–	113	FINAL SCORE	FINAL SCORE	113	–	115	FINAL SCORE	FINAL SCORE	115	–	115	FINAL SCORE
Won			Lost		Lost			Won		Draw			Draw	
Judge: Stanley Christodoulou					Judge: Eugenia Williams					Judge: Larry O'Connell				
Suspensions: None					Point deductions: None					Decision: Split Draw				

== Controversy ==
The decision was met with loud boos from the crowd, while Lewis and his corner were left standing in disbelief. Immediately after the decision was announced, HBO announcers Jim Lampley and George Foreman called the decision "a travesty" and "a shame". Showtime analyst Steve Farhood stated "I've been covering boxing twenty years. I would put this in the top five for the worst decisions I've seen." Roy Jones Jr. said that the decision was the type of thing that made him not want to stay in boxing. Even New York Mayor Rudy Giuliani weighed in, also calling the decision "a travesty".

Most of the blame was heaped upon Eugenia Williams, who had declared Evander Holyfield the winner. Though she initially denied any wrongdoing, after reviewing a replay of the fight, she stated she would have called the fight a draw. British judge Larry O'Connell, who scored the fight a draw, also received a fair amount of criticism. He said he had made a mistake, stating "I feel sorry for myself. I've taken so much stick. But I feel even more sorry for Lennox."

== Aftermath ==
Almost immediately after the fight, the sanctioning bodies ordered a rematch. The rematch took place eight months later on November 13, 1999 in Las Vegas, this time with the lightly regarded IBO Heavyweight title (which was awarded to Lewis prior to the bout) also on the line. The fight again went the full 12 rounds, this time with Lewis being awarded the victory via unanimous decision, becoming the first undisputed heavyweight champion since Riddick Bowe in 1992. While the decision was not received as contentiously as their first bout had been, the result of the rematch also generated significant dispute amongst the press and many observers who felt Holyfield should have won or received a draw.

Lewis was not the undisputed champion for long. The WBA ordered Lewis to face their number one contender John Ruiz. Lewis instead wanted to face Michael Grant in his first defense. The WBA agreed to allow Lewis to face Grant if he would fight Ruiz after, to which Lewis agreed. Don King, who also promoted Ruiz, went to court to protest the ruling claiming that the winner between Holyfield and Lewis would be required to make his first defense of the titles against Ruiz. The ruling came down in favor of Ruiz, as a clause in the contract signed for the rematch confirmed King’s claim. Lewis continued to pursue the fight against Grant, and thus the WBA stripped him of its title. Soon afterwards the WBA created its "Super World Champion" title, in which a unified champion who also holds a WBA belt is given more time in between mandatory title defenses.

The fight between Lewis and Grant for Lewis’ remaining titles was not very competitive as Lewis recorded a second round knockout over the previously undefeated Grant. He would defend the titles twice more before 2000 ended, recording another two round knockout against Francois Botha and a decision against David Tua. Lewis would go on to lose the title when he was knocked out by Hasim Rahman in 2001, but returned the favor in a rematch later that year to become a three-time champion.

Holyfield, meanwhile, was given another chance to become champion as he was paired against Ruiz for the vacant WBA championship in August 2000. Holyfield won a disputed unanimous decision to take the championship and become the first four-time heavyweight champion in boxing history, but in a rematch ordered by the WBA he lost a unanimous decision to Ruiz in 2001. A third fight between the two ended in a draw in December 2001.

== Undercard ==
Confirmed bouts:

== Broadcasting ==
Country	Broadcaster
United Kingdom	Sky Sports
United States	HBO

Preceded by vs. Vaughn Bean	Evander Holyfield' bouts 13 March 1999	Succeeded by Rematch
Preceded by vs. Željko Mavrović	Lennox Lewis's bouts 13 March 1999	Succeeded by Rematch
