= Michael Moorer vs. George Foreman =

1994 professional boxing match

One for the Ages
- Date: November 5, 1994
- Venue: MGM Grand, Paradise, Nevada
- Title(s) on the line: WBA and IBF heavyweight titles

Tale of the tape
Boxer	Michael Moorer	George Foreman
Nickname	Double M	Big
Hometown	Monessen, Pennsylvania, U.S.	Houston, Texas
Purse	$7,000,000	$3,000,000
Pre-fight record	35–0 (30 KO)	72–4 (67 KO)
Age	26 years, 11 months	45 years, 9 months
Height	6 ft 2 in (188 cm)	6 ft 4 in (193 cm)
Weight	222 lb (101 kg)	250 lb (113 kg)
Style	Southpaw	Orthodox
Recognition	WBA and IBF; Heavyweight Champion; The Ring; No. 1 Ranked Heavyweight	IBF; No. 10 Ranked Heavyweight; Former undisputed heavyweight champion

Result
- Foreman wins via 10th-round KO

Michael Moorer vs. George Foreman, billed as One for the Ages, was a professional boxing match contested on November 5, 1994, for the WBA and IBF heavyweight championships.

== Background ==
On April 22, 1994, Moorer defeated Evander Holyfield by decision to wrest the title, which Holyfield had regained from Riddick Bowe in his previous bout, from the two-time champion. Foreman, at 45, had been on the comeback trail for several years after choosing to end his ten-plus year retirement. He had received a shot at Holyfield's undisputed world championship in 1991 but was defeated on points, not by knockout or technical knockout. Foreman also had not fought since being defeated by Tommy Morrison for the then-fringe World Boxing Organization championship in June 1993.

There were talks about Moorer possibly meeting WBC Heavyweight Champion Lennox Lewis in a match that would once again unify the three major heavyweight titles, but Moorer rejected the idea, stating that he didn't have the desire to do so. Foreman then issued a challenge to the newly crowned champion, and his status as one of the most popular fighters in the sport along with the promise of a big payday led to Moorer ultimately accepting Foreman's challenge. The fight was scheduled for November 5, 1994.

However, the fight almost did not take place. The WBA did not have Foreman ranked on its list of contenders and was thus not willing to sanction the bout. The IBF, which installed Foreman as its eighth-ranked contender, did offer sanctioning, but the WBA warned Moorer that regardless of what happened, he would be stripped of their championship if he went forward with the Foreman fight. Thus, his promoters at Main Events announced on August 10 that the fight was cancelled.

Foreman and his promoter Bob Arum of Top Rank responded to the decision by filing a lawsuit in a Nevada state court on August 15. The suit alleged that the WBA colluded with others to discriminate against the 45-year old Foreman and to force Moorer and Main Events to honor the contract they had signed, with the demand that the champion not be allowed to step in the ring until they did. On August 20, the complainants won an injunction against the WBA. The presiding judge said the organization acted "capriciously" in not sanctioning the fight, and as long as he obtained medical clearance from Nevada doctors Foreman would be eligible to fight for the WBA title.

=== Media ===
The fight was broadcast by HBO and aired as part of their long running series, HBO World Championship Boxing. Jim Lampley was the lead broadcaster, with Larry Merchant as lead analyst and Harold Lederman as unofficial ringside scorekeeper. Gil Clancy was brought in to serve as second analyst alongside Merchant; that role was usually filled by Foreman, who was participating in the fight.

=== Officials ===
Joe Cortez, a veteran of nearly 900 fights in his career, was the referee for the bout. He had already refereed five world championship fights in 1994 alone.

The ringside judges were Chuck Giampa, Jerry Roth, and Duane Ford.

== The fight ==
Foreman said after the fight that he was out to lay his ghost from the Rumble in the Jungle to rest, referring to the legendary fight twenty years before in Kinshasa, Zaire (now Democratic Republic of Congo) where Muhammad Ali had overcome a previously undefeated Foreman and knocked him out in the eighth round (which remains Foreman's only loss by knockout) to win the heavyweight title that Foreman had held after defeating Joe Frazier in 1973 in Kingston, Jamaica by knocking him down six times in two rounds. Not only did Foreman wear the same red trunks that he had worn in Zaire, but in his corner was Ali's legendary trainer Angelo Dundee, who had been in Ali's corner for that fight.

Down goes Moorer on a right hand! An unbelievably close-in right-hand shot! ... (after Cortez reaches the count of 10) It happened! IT HAPPENED!!!

— Jim Lampley's call on HBO during the knockout

Moorer controlled the pace of the fight from the beginning and kept winning rounds. Foreman took a significant number of jabs to the face, which began to take a toll later in the fight as his left eye nearly swelled shut. In spite of the physical pounding Moorer was giving him, Foreman remained on his feet. As noted, he had only been stopped once in his career in the fight with Ali. In addition, only Ali, Jimmy Young and Ron Lyle had been able to knock him down during the course of his career.

Despite his ability to take whatever Moorer was throwing at him, Foreman appeared on the way to yet another defeat in a world championship fight. After the ninth round, judges Roth and Giampa had given seven rounds to Moorer and had him up 88–83. Judge Ford's scorecard was a little closer, as he scored the bout 86–85 in favor of the champion with Foreman winning two additional rounds on his card. Knowing where his fighter stood, Dundee told Foreman just before he sent him out for the tenth round that it was going to take a knockout to win and that the time to get it had come.

Meanwhile, in the champion's corner, his trainer Teddy Atlas had picked up on what Foreman would later say what he had made his major strategy during the fight. Atlas told Moorer that Foreman was landing his best shots in close quarters, and Foreman was throwing a quick series of combinations starting with a jab, which he used to break through Moorer's guard, and then following that up with a quick right cross. Atlas advised Moorer to stand back and make Foreman come to him.

However, Moorer did not follow Atlas’ instructions and kept advancing on Foreman as the round began. The challenger eventually hurt Moorer with a body punch, which slowed his progress to the point where Foreman was able to start landing his combinations more frequently. Moorer was able to fend Foreman off for most of the round, but Foreman was eventually able to land one combination that caught Moorer flush on the jaw.

Moorer, dazed, fell to his back as Cortez began his count. He lifted his head off the canvas for a second, then began moving as the count reached five. By the time Cortez reached eight, Moorer had rolled over onto his side and tried to push himself up, but he was still on his knees when the count reached ten. Foreman was declared the winner by knockout and became the champion.

Years later, when the fight was featured as part of HBO's Legendary Nights documentary series chronicling memorable fights broadcast by the network, Foreman said that his strategy was to let Moorer fight his usual fight while waiting for him to slip up. He felt that if he was able to wait, Moorer would leave himself open for a combination that would allow Foreman to knock him out. Foreman went further saying that was how he dreamed the situation would present itself. Moorer dismissed Foreman's recollection of the events, instead repeatedly saying he got "lucky".

=== Records ===
At 45 years and 360 days, Foreman become the oldest world champion in heavyweight history, he beat Jersey Joe Walcott's old record by eight years, and he had also become the first man to regain a world boxing title twenty years after losing it - and on top of that, no heavyweight champion had beaten an opponent 19 years his junior to win a title. Boxing analysts and fans alike remarked on how Foreman had exorcised his old ghost in more ways than one - he had upset Moorer in a way similar to how Ali had stunned a younger Foreman in Zaire, using toughness, savvy and an ability to summon power at critical moments to overcome youth, speed and power.

== Aftermath ==
After his victory, Foreman hoped for a potential superfight with Mike Tyson once Tyson was released from prison. However, the WBA demanded that he face mandatory challenger and former world champion Tony Tucker. Tucker, at the time, was promoted by Don King, and Foreman was unwilling to get himself involved with King or his fighters. Thus, he refused to fight Tucker and was stripped of the WBA championship.

Foreman instead pursued a fight with German Axel Schulz for the IBF title, which he won by majority decision. However, there was significant controversy in the decision as many saw Schulz as having won the fight and a rematch was ordered. Foreman refused to give Schulz the match, as he was seeking other opportunities including rematches with Moorer or Holyfield or a match with former undisputed champion Riddick Bowe. Therefore, on June 28, 1995, Foreman relinquished the IBF championship. Foreman was still recognized as the lineal champion as well as the champion of the fringe World Boxing Union, and continued to hold that recognition until Shannon Briggs defeated him in 1997 in what would prove to be his final fight.

Moorer, meanwhile, got a chance to regain a portion of the heavyweight championship in early 1996 thanks to another set of controversial circumstances. The IBF sanctioned a fight between Schulz and the then-undefeated South African Francois Botha, which took place on December 9, 1995, in Stuttgart. Botha won the fight by split decision, but later tested positive for nandrolone. The fight was ruled a no-contest due to the positive test and Moorer was selected to face Schulz in a second bout to fill the vacancy. That fight took place on June 22, 1996, in Dortmund, and Moorer emerged with a split decision victory to join Foreman, Holyfield, Tim Witherspoon, Muhammad Ali, and Floyd Patterson as the only fighters to that point in history to regain a portion of the heavyweight championship after having lost it. In his first defense of the championship, Moorer faced Botha as part of a heavyweight championship tripleheader on November 9, 1996, and knocked him out in the final round. After getting a close majority decision victory against Vaughn Bean in his next defense, Moorer took on Holyfield, who had knocked out Tyson in the main event of the aforementioned tripleheader, in a rematch where Moorer's IBF and Holyfield's WBA championships were both on the line. Moorer was dropped five times in eight rounds and suffered his second defeat in his career. Following that fight, he took a three-year retirement from the ring, returning in 2000 to score a knockout over journeyman Lorenzo Boyd. Moorer was later knocked out by David Tua in thirty seconds in 2002 and subsequently retired again; he returned the next year and fought until 2008, suffering a fourth defeat at the hands of journeyman Eliseo Castillo and winning two regional heavyweight championships from Vassiliy Jirov before he called it a career.

Foreman settled back into life as a preacher, author, pitchman and motivational speaker in Houston. Two years after his second and final retirement, Salton Inc. paid over $137 million to buy out the right to use his name on the George Foreman Grill, and it is estimated that he made over $200 million related to the grill, which is more than he made in the ring. The fight is the climactic scene in Foreman's 2023 biopic, Big George Foreman.

On March 26, 2025, Foreman died from undisclosed causes at the age of 76.

== Undercard ==
Confirmed bouts:

== Broadcasting ==
Country	Broadcaster
Mexico	Televisa
Philippines	World TV 21
United Kingdom	Sky Sports
United States	HBO

Preceded by vs. Evander Holyfield	Michael Moorer's bouts 5 November 1994	Succeeded by vs. Melvin Foster
Preceded by vs. Tommy Morrison	George Foreman's bouts 5 November 1994	Succeeded by vs. Axel Schulz
Awards
Preceded by Julian Jackson vs. Gerald McClellan	The Ring Knockout of the Year; 1994	Succeeded by Carl Daniels vs. Julio César Vásquez
