= Michael Moorer vs. Vaughn Bean =

Boxing match

The March of Ides
- Date: March 29, 1997
- Venue: Las Vegas Hilton, Winchester, Nevada, U.S.
- Title on the line: IBF Heavyweight Championship

Tale of the tape
Boxer	Michael Moorer	Vaughn Bean
Nickname	Double M	Shake & Bake
Hometown	Monessen, Pennsylvania, U.S.	Chicago, Illinois, U.S.
Purse	$3,600,000	$500,000
Pre-fight record	38–1 (31 KO)	27–0 (21 KO)
Age	29 years, 4 months	22 years, 6 months
Height	6 ft 2 in (188 cm)	5 ft 11 in (180 cm)
Weight	212 lb (96 kg)	212 lb (96 kg)
Style	Southpaw	Orthodox
Recognition	IBF; Heavyweight Champion; The Ring; No. 4 Ranked Heavyweight	IBF; No. 5 Ranked Heavyweight

Result
- Moorer wins via majority decision (116–113, 115–113, 114–114)

Michael Moorer vs. Vaughn Bean, billed as The March of Ides, was a professional boxing match contested on March 29, 1997, for the IBF heavyweight title.

== Background ==
Michael Moorer, in his second reign as IBF heavyweight champion, was coming off a TKO victory over Francois Botha on the undercard of first Mike Tyson–Evander Holyfield fight on November 9, 1996. Following his victory, Moorer was given the opportunity to headline his own pay-per-view by taking on the undefeated but little-known Vaughn Bean. Bean came in to the fight with a 27–0 record and was ranked by IBF as the number-five heavyweight contender, but had faced marginal competition up to that point and he was installed as sizeable 5–1 underdog. Just before the fight, Moorer took ill with the common cold forcing him to no-show a pre-fight press conference the week of the fight, though his manager John Davimos dismissed the illness and insisted Moorer would be "100 percent" come fight time. Moorer had a lot riding on the fight as a victory over Bean all but insured him a chance to face the winner of the Holyfield–Tyson rematch originally scheduled to take place a month later in May, but later pushed back to June. Moorer, however, remained focused on his fight with Bean and refused to entertain the thought of a fight with Tyson, who was a slight favorite over Holyfield, stating "We can't talk about Tyson because if I don't beat Bean, then there's no fight."

The fight, which took place on March 29, 1997, was originally scheduled to take place two week before that date on March 15, but problems within Moorer's camp, namely with his manager John Davimos, whom Moorer was looking to replace, and trainer Teddy Atlas, who vowed to leave Moorer should he part ways with Davimos, caused the fight to be pushed back. Moorer ultimately retained both Davimos and Atlas' services.

The Moorer–Bean main event was complemented with three other world championship fights as well as a non-title bout featuring Julio César Chávez taking on journeyman Tony Martin in what was the featured extraction on the undercard. Chávez was originally set to face Gary Kirkland, but Kirkland was forced to pull out of the fight after suffering a cut during training leading to Martin taking the fight on two weeks notice. Chávez and Martin had agreed to a catchweight of 145 pounds, between the super lightweight and welterweight divisions, but Chávez weighed in at 151 pounds six pounds over the contracted limit and had to pay Martin $100,000 out of his $700,000 purse in order to get Martin to agree to fight at a heavier weight. Chávez would win the fight by unanimous decision.

== The fight ==
Despite a lackluster effort, Moorer would nevertheless earn a close majority decision victory. Moorer fought an extremely cautious, defense-orientated style and despite pleas from Atlas for Moorer to press the action and fight more aggressively. Moorer ultimately did just enough as two judges scored the fight 116–113 (seven rounds to four, one round even) and 115–113 (seven rounds to five) while the third judge scored the fight even at 114–114, having had Moorer down four rounds going into the ninth before giving Moorer the final four rounds.

== Aftermath ==
The fight was Moorer's last with Atlas as his trainer. Atlas was so displeased with Moorer's subpar performance that he announced his decision to leave Moorer just two days after the Bean fight, admitting that he had and Moorer had a volatile training camp leading up to the fight in which the two had almost come to blows. Explaining his decision to part ways with Moorer, Atlas explained "I watched Cus D'Amato at the end, saying he would always be true to his principles, and allow himself to be treated badly (by Tyson) just to be with a fighter. I saw that and I vowed it would never happen to me." Moorer would hire Freddie Roach to replace Atlas for his next fight; a unification bout with Evander Holyfield, who had defeated Tyson in their rematch by disqualification to set up a rematch with Moorer three years after Moorer had previously defeated him for the WBA and IBF heavyweight titles.

== Fight card ==
Confirmed bouts:

Weight Class	Weight		vs.		Method	Round	Notes
Heavyweight	200+ lbs.	Michael Moorer (c)	def	Vaughn Bean	MD	12/12	^{Note 1}
Super Welterweight	154 lbs.	Laurent Boudouani (c)	def	Carl Daniels	UD	12/12	^{Note 2}
Strawweight	105 lbs.	Ricardo López (c)	def.	Mongkol Charoen	UD	12/12	^{Note 3}
Super Welterweight	154 lbs.	Julio César Chávez	def.	Tony Martin	UD	10/10
Mini Flyweight	105 lbs.	Alex Sánchez (c)	def.	Víctor Burgos	UD	12/12	^{Note 4}
Middleweight	160 lbs.	Julio César Green	def.	Bernice Barber	KO	4/8
Lightweight	135 lbs.	Laura Serrano	def.	Cheryl Nance	TKO	3/4
Heavyweight	200+ lbs.	Nate Jones	def.	Ricardo Phillips	UD	4/4

^Note 1 For IBF heavyweight title
^Note 2 For WBA super welterweight title
^Note 3 For WBC strawweight title
^Note 4 For WBO mini flyweight title

== Broadcasting ==
Country	Broadcaster
United States	Showtime

Preceded by vs. Francois Botha	Michael Moorer's bouts 29 March 1997	Succeeded by vs. Evander Holyfield II
Preceded by vs. Earl Talley	Vaughn Bean's bouts 29 March 1997	Succeeded by vs. Bryant Smith
