= Michael Moorer vs. Axel Schulz =

Boxing match

- Date: 22 June 1996
- Venue: Westfalenstadion, Dortmund, North Rhine-Westphalia, Germany
- Title(s) on the line: IBF Heavyweight Championship

Tale of the tape
Boxer	Michael Moorer	Axel Schulz
Nickname	Double M	Der sanfte Riese (The Gentle Giant)
Hometown	Monessen, Pennsylvania, U.S.	Frankfurt an der Oder, Brandenburg, Germany
Purse	$3,600,000	$1,700,000
Pre-fight record	36–1 (30 KO)	21–2–1 (1) (10 KO)
Age	28 years, 7 months	27 years, 7 months
Height	6 ft 2 in (188 cm)	6 ft 3 in (191 cm)
Weight	222 1/4 lb (101 kg)	222 3/4 lb (101 kg)
Style	Southpaw	Orthodox
Recognition	IBF; No. 1 Ranked Heavyweight; Former Unified Heavyweight Champion	IBF; No. 2 Ranked Heavyweight

Result
- Moorer defeated Schulz by 12 round split decision

Michael Moorer vs. Axel Schulz was a professional boxing match contested on 22 June 1996, for the IBF heavyweight championship.

== Background ==
Following his controversial victory over Axel Schulz in April 1995, the IBF demanded that their heavyweight champion George Foreman have a rematch with Schulz or be stripped of the title. Foreman would decide against a rematch would relinquish the title. The IBF would order a match between their two top ranked heavyweights, the number one ranked Francois Botha and the now number-two ranked Schulz to determine the next IBF heavyweight champion. Botha would win by unanimous decision on December 9, 1995, but tested for steroids shortly after, causing the IBF to overturn Botha's victory into a no-contest and rescind Botha's recognition as champion. This led to Schulz getting a third consecutive opportunity at the championship, this time against the former champion Michael Moorer.

The bout was to be held at Westfalenstadion (the home of Borussia Dortmund), and was biggest boxing event held in Germany since Muhammad Ali faced Karl Mildenberger in 1966.

== The fight ==
Moorer dominated the first six rounds against a sluggish and passive Schulz, however flurry of combinations from Schulz in the seventh fired up the home crowd and led to his best period of the bout. At the end of 12 rounds judge Walter Cavalieri scored it 115–113 for Schulz, while Dave Parris had it 116–113 and John Stewart 115–113 both in favour of Moorer giving him a split decision victory.

== Aftermath ==
Speaking after the bout Schulz accepted his defeat, saying "I think the decision was OK, I can live with it, because I think Moorer’s one of the best fighters around."

== Undercard ==
Confirmed bouts:

== Broadcasting ==
Country	Broadcaster
Germany	RTL
Philippines	Citynet Television 27
United Kingdom	Sky Sports
United States	ABC / Fox Sports Net

Preceded by vs. Melvin Foster	Michael Moorer's bouts 22 June 1996	Succeeded by vs. Francois Botha
Preceded by vs. Francois Botha	Axel Schulz's bouts 22 June 1996	Succeeded by vs. Jose Ribalta
