= Evander Holyfield vs. Vaughn Bean =

Boxing competition

The Power and the Glory
- Date: September 19, 1998
- Venue: Georgia Dome, Atlanta, Georgia, U.S.
- Title(s) on the line: WBA and IBF heavyweight titles

Tale of the tape
Boxer	Evander Holyfield	Vaughn Bean
Nickname	The Real Deal	Shake and Bake
Hometown	Atlanta, Georgia, U.S.	Chicago, Illinois
Purse	$3,500,000	$1,800,000
Pre-fight record	35–3 (25 KO)	31–1 (25 KO)
Age	35 years, 11 months	24 years
Height	6 ft 2 1/2 in (189 cm)	5 ft 11 in (180 cm)
Weight	217 lb (98 kg)	231 lb (105 kg)
Style	Orthodox	Orthodox
Recognition	WBA and IBF; Heavyweight Champion; The Ring pound-for-pound No. 5 ranked fighter 2-division undisputed world champion	IBF; No. 1 Ranked Heavyweight

Result
- Holyfield wins via 12-round unanimous decision (117–110, 117–110, 116–111)

Evander Holyfield vs. Vaughn Bean, billed as The Power and the Glory, was a professional boxing match contested on September 19, 1998 for the WBA and IBF heavyweight championships.

== Background ==
WBA and IBF heavyweight champion Evander Holyfield had embarked on one of the more successful comebacks in boxing history. Holyfield had lost two of his last four fights before landing a WBA heavyweight title shot against Mike Tyson. Though Holyfield came into the fight as an overwhelming underdog (Odds opened at 28–1 in favor of Tyson before dropping to 6–1 by the time of the fight) Holyfield was able to score one of the biggest upset victories in the history of the sport after defeating Tyson in the 11th round by technical knockout.

In 1997, Holyfield would successfully defend his newly won title after Tyson was disqualified for biting both of his ears. After that, Holyfield agreed to a unification match with IBF heavyweight champion Michael Moorer, who had previously defeated Holyfield over three years prior to capture the WBA and IBF titles. Hoylfield would avenge his previous loss to Moorer, gaining five knockdowns over him before the fight was stopped after the eighth round. With Holyfield now once again in possession of two of boxing's major heavyweight titles, talks for a unification match with Lennox Lewis, who held the WBC heavyweight title, began. However, the two sides were unable to reach a deal and Lewis moved on to face lineal heavyweight champion Shannon Briggs Left with little choice, Holyfield was matched up against the WBA's number one contender and mandatory challenger Henry Akinwande. Before the match could take place, Akinwande was diagnosed with hepatitis B and the bout was postponed and eventually cancelled. Instead, Holyfield moved on to face another mandatory challenger Vaughn Bean, who was the IBF's number one contender.

Bean came into the fight with a 32–1 record but nearly all of his wins were against low quality fighters with losing records. The combined records of the fighters Bean had faced was an abysmal 152–294–14 and only four of the fighters he had faced had a winning record by the time of his fight with Holyfield. His only loss, however, was a close majority decision against then-IBF heavyweight champion Michael Moorer in what would be Moorer's second and final successful defense before dropping the IBF title to Holyfield in his next fight.

== The Fight ==
Having not fought in 10 months, Holyfield appeared sluggish at times throughout the fight, and Bean, who was given little chance of even being competitive, put on a decent showing, landing several big shots against Holyfield and lasting the full 12 rounds with the champion. The fight's most memorable moment came in the tenth round. Holyfield was having difficulty with Bean through the round's first two minutes, but with a minute to go, Holyfield had turned the tables and had Bean in trouble after landing some heavy shots to Bean's head. Bean attempted to clinch Holyfield and proceeded to push him into the ropes. However, Holyfield sidestepped Bean and sent him crashing into the ropes. With Bean now off balance Holyfield delivered a right uppercut that knocked Bean to the canvas. Bean got back up at the count of 7 and withstood a late rally by Holyfield to survive the round. After two more close rounds, the decision went to the judge's scorecards. All three judges had Holyfield the clear winner with two scores of 117–110 and one score of 116–111.

== Aftermath ==
With both of their mandatories out of the way Lewis and Holyfield agreed to meet in March 1999 for the Undisputed championship.

== Undercard ==
Confirmed bouts:

== Broadcasting ==
Country	Broadcaster
United States	Showtime

Preceded by vs. Michael Moorer II	Evander Holyfield's bouts September 19, 1998	Succeeded by vs. Lennox Lewis
Preceded by vs. Lamont Burgin	Vaughn Bean's bouts September 19, 1998	Succeeded by vs. Lorenzo Boyd
