= George Foreman vs. Axel Schulz =

Boxing match

Celebration
- Date: April 22, 1995
- Venue: MGM Grand Garden Arena, Paradise, Nevada, US
- Title(s) on the line: IBF, WBU and Lineal Heavyweight Championships

Tale of the tape
Boxer	George Foreman	Axel Schulz
Nickname	Big	Der sanfte Riese ("The Gentle Giant")
Hometown	Houston, Texas, US	Frankfurt an der Oder, Brandenburg, Germany
Purse	$10,000,000	$350,000
Pre-fight record	73–4 (68 KO)	21–1–1 (10 KO)
Age	46 years, 3 months	26 years, 5 months
Height	6 ft 4 in (193 cm)	6 ft 3 in (191 cm)
Weight	256 lb (116 kg)	221 lb (100 kg)
Style	Orthodox	Orthodox
Recognition	IBF/Lineal; Heavyweight Champion; The Ring; No. 1 Ranked Heavyweight	IBF; No. 9 Ranked Heavyweight

Result
- Foreman defeated Schulz by 12th round majority decision

George Foreman vs. Axel Schulz, billed as Celebration, was a professional boxing match contest, held on April 22, 1995, for Foreman's IBF and lineal heavyweight championships, as well as the vacant WBU heavyweight championship.

== Background ==
In his previous fight, 45-year-old George Foreman made history by becoming the oldest heavyweight champion in boxing history after scoring an upset knockout victory over Michael Moorer on November 5, 1994. In early 1995, Foreman began negotiations to make the first defense of his newly won WBA and IBF titles against German mid-level prospect Axel Schulz. However, Schulz was unranked by both organizations and Foreman needed permission from both the WBA and IBF to continue on with his defense. The IBF ultimately agreed to allow Foreman to defend the title against Schulz and raised Schulz ranking to number 9, but the WBA refused, insisting that he instead face its number one contender Tony Tucker. Nevertheless, Foreman opted to continue on with his fight against Schulz and allowed the WBA to strip him of its title.

In 2000, citing extortion; boxing promoter Bob Arum voluntarily testified to having paid IBF president Bobby Lee $100,000 in two installments in 1995, as the first half of a $200,000 bribe, through "middleman, Stanley Hoffman," adding that Lee had first demanded $500,000 to sanction the Schulz-Foreman fight, but had settled for the lesser amount of $200,000 (half of which was never paid). Arum was sanctioned and fined $125,000 by the Nevada State Athletic Commission

The New York Times reported that Foreman earned about $12 million and Schulz earned $1 million, and that "Foreman's celebrity status persuaded HBO to pay more for this fight than for any other event in the cable network's history." Foreman said that his payday would be spent for his children higher education, stating, "I've got to send nine children through college."

== The Fight ==
Though Foreman came into the fight as a 6–1 favorite over the virtually unknown Schulz, the young German surprised many by giving Foreman a tough fight. The younger Schulz used his speed to his advantage and spent a majority of the fight circling Foreman while effectively peppering the champion with right hands throughout. In the fourth round, Foreman managed to open a cut on Schulz' forehead with a right hand and staggered him for the first time in the fifth, but Schulz continued to stand toe-to-toe with Foreman for the remainder of the fight. By the time the 12th round ended, Foreman's left eye had swelled completely shut due in part to Schulz' hard right hands. The fight then turned to the judge's scorecards. HBO's unofficial scorer Harold Lederman had Schulz winning a lopsided decision by the score of 117–111 (9 rounds to 3). However, the official judges disagreed, one judge ruled the fight a draw with a score of 114–114, while the other two had the fight 115–113 in favor of Foreman, making Foreman the winner by majority decision.

== Aftermath ==
Though Foreman had hoped for a potential superfight with the returning Mike Tyson should he defeat Schulz, the controversial nature of Foreman's victory led to the IBF demanding Foreman face Schulz in a rematch or be stripped of the title. However, Foreman decided against a rematch with Schulz and decided to relinquish the IBF title, though he would continue to be recognized as the Lineal champion and defended that title, as well as the lightly regarded WBU title he had won against Schulz, against fringe-contenders Crawford Grimsley and Lou Savarese before losing to Shannon Briggs in what would prove to be the final fight of his career in 1997.

The Ring would also demote Foreman from atop their heavyweight ranking to 3rd, behind WBC titist Oliver McCall and former champion Riddick Bowe.

Meanwhile, the IBF ordered a match between their two top ranked heavyweights, the number one ranked Francois Botha and the now number-two ranked Schulz to determine the next IBF heavyweight champion. Botha would win by unanimous decision on December 9, 1995, but tested for steroids shortly after, causing the IBF to overturn Botha's victory into a no-contest and rescind Botha's recognition as champion. This led to Schulz getting a third consecutive opportunity at the championship, this time against the former champion Michael Moorer. The two would meet on June 22, 1996, in Schulz' native Germany, but Schulz was again unable to capture the title, losing to Moorer by split decision.

== Undercard ==
Confirmed bouts:

== Broadcasting ==
Country	Broadcaster
Germany	RTL
Netherlands	Eurosport
United States	HBO
Thailand	Channel 5

Preceded by vs. Michael Moorer	George Foreman's bouts April 22, 1995	Succeeded by vs. Crawford Grimsley
Preceded by vs. James Smith	Axel Schulz's bouts April 22, 1995	Succeeded by vs. Francois Botha
