= Stanley Christodoulou =

- Στάνλυ Χριστοδούλου
- Born: January 31, 1946 (age 80)
- Occupations: boxing referee boxing judge
- Years active: 1963–2024

Stanley Christodoulou (Greek: Στάνλυ Χριστοδούλου; born 31 January 1946) is a South African international boxing judge and referee of Greek Cypriot descent. Christodoulou has judged bouts in his native South Africa, as well as internationally with the WBA, with whom he is involved in leaderships roles dealing with officiating.

== Career ==
He began his boxing career in 1963 and refereed his first world title bout in 1973 when Romeo Anaya and Arnold Taylor fought for the world bantamweight title.

He is a member of the World Boxing Association's International Officials Committee, and in 1980 was named the WBA's 'Referee of the Year'.

Some of the notable bouts Christodoulou has refereed include:

- José Cuevas vs. Thomas Hearns
- Aaron Pryor vs. Alexis Argüello (First bout)
- Marvin Hagler vs. Roberto Durán
- Victor Galindez vs. Richie Kates
- John Ruiz vs. Nikolai Valuev
- Andreas Kotelnik vs. Amir Khan

His most notable bout as a judge was the first bout between Evander Holyfield and Lennox Lewis where he was the only one to score the bout for Lewis, in line with most of the ringside observers.

Other notable bouts he judged include:

- Evander Holyfield vs. Michael Moorer II
- David Reid vs. Félix Trinidad
- Félix Trinidad vs. Fernando Vargas
- Evander Holyfield vs. John Ruiz II
- William Joppy vs. Félix Trinidad
- Félix Trinidad vs. Bernard Hopkins
- John Ruiz vs. Roy Jones Jr.
- Oscar De La Hoya vs. Shane Mosley II
- John Ruiz vs. Ruslan Chagaev
- Nikolai Valuev vs. Ruslan Chagaev
- Miguel Cotto vs. Alfonso Gómez
- Oscar De La Hoya vs. Manny Pacquiao
- Arthur Abraham vs. Jermain Taylor
- Mikkel Kessler vs. Andre Ward
- David Haye vs. John Ruiz
- Andre Ward vs. Arthur Abraham
- Wladimir Klitschko vs. David Haye
- David Haye vs. Dereck Chisora
- Julio César Chávez Jr. vs. Sergio Martínez
- Canelo Álvarez vs. Austin Trout
- Adrien Broner vs. Marcos Maidana
- Miguel Cotto vs. Daniel Geale
- Manny Pacquiao vs. Lucas Matthysse
- Chantelle Cameron vs. Jessica McCaskill
- Oleksandr Usyk vs. Daniel Dubois

== Legacy ==
Christodoulou was inducted into the International Boxing Hall of Fame in Canastota, New York on 13 June 2004. He was the first man to referee world title fights in all 17 weight categories, and the third to oversee 100 world title bouts. Christodoulou served as executive director of the South African Boxing Board of Control, and has twice been named South African boxing's 'Man of the Year'.
