= Evander Holyfield vs. Ray Mercer =

Boxing match

The Warrior Returns
- Date: May 20, 1995
- Venue: Convention Hall, Atlantic City, New Jersey, U.S.

Tale of the tape
Boxer	Evander Holyfield	Ray Mercer
Nickname	The Real Deal	Merciless
Hometown	Atlanta, Georgia, U.S.	Union City, New Jersey, U.S.
Purse	$2,000,000	$250,000
Pre-fight record	30–2 (22 KO)	23–2–1 (16 KO)
Age	32 years, 7 months	34 years, 1 month
Height	6 ft 2 in (188 cm)	6 ft 1 in (185 cm)
Weight	209 3/4 lb (95 kg)	224 lb (102 kg)
Style	Orthodox	Orthodox
Recognition	2-division undisputed world champion	Former WBO heavyweight champion

Result
- Holyfield wins via 10-round unanimous decision (97–92, 96–93, 95–94)

Evander Holyfield vs. Ray Mercer, billed as The Warrior Returns, was a professional boxing match contested on May 20, 1995.

== Background ==
Evander Holyfield's second heavyweight championship reign had ended after only 5 months following a loss to Michael Moorer in his first defense. Holyfield was hospitalized after the fight and it was determined that he had a previously undetected heart ailment and was advised to retire immediately, which he would officially announce only four days after the Moorer fight. In June Holyfield attended one of televangelist and "faith healer" Benny Hinn's healing sessions. After being touched by Hinn, Holyfield claimed he felt a "warm feeling" go through his body and afterwards proclaimed he was "healed" of his heart ailment and was ready to resume his boxing career. Holyfield initially failed to get medical clearance after a New York cardiologist determined that his heart ailment had not healed sufficiently enough to allow Holyfield to continue boxing in September. However, two months later, the Mayo Clinic did medically clear Holyfield with a spokesman for the clinic stating that Holyfield was in "excellent health." As the Nevada Athletic Commission had medically suspended Holyfield's boxing license, the five-person committee would have to vote to reinstate Holyfield and in February 1995 the commission would vote 4–1 to lift Holyfield's ban. The following month, Holyfield would announce his comeback bout would be against former WBO heavyweight champion Ray Mercer.

== The fight ==
In a hard-fought affair, Holyfield rebounded from a deep cut over his right eye to earn a unanimous decision victory. Mercer opened the cut during the sixth round. The cut plagued Holyfield to the point that the referee stopped the fight in the eighth to allow the ringside physician to check on the cut. After the fight resumed Mercer went on the attack and even began showboating by winding up his left hand before throwing his right. Holyfield would come back with a barrage of punches that sent Mercer to his knees for the first and only knockdown of the fight and the first knockdown of Mercer's professional career. Holyfield would control the remainder of the fight and won all three scorecards with scores of 97–92, 96–93 and 95–94.

Holyfield chose not to have a traditional cut-man in his corner instead having his head trainer Don Turner handle the duties. This would almost backfire for Holyfield as the deep cut that he received in the sixth round nearly cost him a victory. Said the ringside physician Dr. Frank Doggett "I thought his cut man did a terrible job. A good cut man could stop that. If it got any worse I would have stopped it."

== Fight card ==
Confirmed bouts:

Weight Class	Weight		vs.		Method	Round	Time	Notes
Heavyweight	200+ lb	Evander Holyfield	def.	Ray Mercer	UD	10/10
Middleweight	160 lb	Héctor Camacho (c)	def.	Homer Gibbins	UD	12/12		^{Note 1}
Heavyweight	200+ lb	David Tua	def.	Dan Murphy	TKO	5/10
Welterweight	147 lb	Sal Lopez	def	Jermal Corbin	RTD	4/8
Heavyweight	200+ lb	Michael Grant	def	Lou Turchiarelli	TKO	1/8

^Note 1 For IBC Middleweight title

== Broadcasting ==
Country	Broadcaster
United States	HBO

Preceded by vs. Michael Moorer	Evander Holyfield's bouts 20 May 1995	Succeeded by vs. Riddick Bowe III
Preceded by vs. Marion Wilson	Ray Mercer's bouts 20 May 1995	Succeeded by vs. Lennox Lewis
