= Evander Holyfield vs. Michael Moorer II =

Boxing match

Return to Glory
- Date: November 8, 1997
- Venue: Thomas & Mack Center, Paradise, Nevada, U.S.
- Title(s) on the line: WBA and IBF heavyweight titles

Tale of the tape
Boxer	Evander Holyfield	Michael Moorer
Nickname	The Real Deal	Double M
Hometown	Atlanta, Georgia, U.S.	Monessen, Pennsylvania, U.S.
Purse	$20,000,000	$8,000,000
Pre-fight record	34–3 (24 KO)	39–1 (31 KO)
Age	35 years	29 years, 11 months
Height	6 ft 2 1/2 in (189 cm)	6 ft 2 in (188 cm)
Weight	214 lb (97 kg)	223 lb (101 kg)
Style	Orthodox	Southpaw
Recognition	WBA; Heavyweight Champion; The Ring pound-for-pound No. 8 ranked fighter The Ring; No. 1 Ranked Heavyweight; 2-division undisputed world champion	IBF; Heavyweight Champion; The Ring; No. 3 Ranked Heavyweight

Result
- Holyfield defeated Moorer via 8th round technical knockout

Evander Holyfield vs. Michael Moorer II, billed as Return to Glory, was a professional boxing match contested November 8, 1997 for the WBA and IBF heavyweight championships.

== Background ==
After Riddick Bowe vacated the WBC Heavyweight title in 1992 followed by George Foreman being stripped of both the WBA and IBF Heavyweight titles in 1995, the heavyweight boxing division was in limbo as three different men laid claim to each of the three major heavyweight championships in 1997. Evander Holyfield and Michael Moorer held the WBA and IBF Heavyweight titles respectively, while Lennox Lewis held the WBC version of the title. In an effort to unify the three titles, the WBA and IBF organizations announced a unification bout between Holyfield and Moorer set for November 8, 1997, the first such bout between alphabet titleholders since 1987.

The two men had previously fought each other on April 22, 1994 for Holyfield's WBA, IBF and Lineal Heavyweight championships. In a close fight, Moorer earned an upset victory over Holyfield to become the first southpaw to win a major Heavyweight title. However, his reign would not last long as he was defeated by 45-year-old George Foreman via 10th-round knockout in his first defense of the titles. Foreman, however, would eventually be stripped of both the WBA and IBF titles after refusing to fight Tony Tucker and Axel Schulz respectively. The vacant WBA title was then won by Bruce Seldon, who then lost the title to Mike Tyson. Tyson's first defense was against Holyfield, who earned an upset victory by 11th-round technical knockout to regain the WBA Heavyweight title. He would then successfully defend the title in a rematch with Tyson after Tyson was disqualified in the third round for biting Holyfield's ears. Meanwhile, Moorer would face Axel Schulz to determine who would win the vacant IBF Heavyweight title, winning the contest by split decision. He would successfully defend the title twice before his rematch with Holyfield.

== The fight ==
Through the first four rounds, the fight was fought evenly between the two combatants. Midway through round 3, the fight was brought to a stop after an accidental clash of heads opened up a cut above the right eye of Holyfield. After the delay, Moorer fought well for remainder of round 3 as well as round 4, using his powerful right jab to his advantage. In round 5, however, the close fight would take a dramatic turn as Holyfield would drop Moorer to the canvas at 2:37 of the round. Moorer would remain on his knees before answering referee Mitch Halpern's count at 8. Moorer appeared to recover from the knockdown, having a strong round 6. Things took a downward spiral for Moorer minute into round 7 though after he was sent backwards after a right hook–left hand combination from Holyfield. Moorer was able to recover and fend off Holyfield's assault but was again sent backward following a Holyfield at 1:35 of the round. Holyfield would follow up with a right uppercut at 1:57 that knocked down Moorer for the second time in the fight. Moorer again answered the referee's count at 8, but found himself knocked down for the second time in the round by another Holyfield uppercut, this time answering the referee's count at 3. Things would get worse for Moorer in round 8 as he was knocked down for a fourth time after receiving a pair of right hands from Holyfield, again answering the count at 8. Holyfield would continue his assault on the exhausted Moorer, knocking him down for the fifth and final time with three seconds remaining in the round. For the fourth time, Moorer would get up, this time at the count of 8. Though Moorer narrowly survived round 8, he would not get the chance to continue the fight. After being examined by ringside physician Flip Homansky, it was decided Moorer could not continue and Holyfield was awarded the victory via technical knockout. A disappointed Moorer was seen pleading with Homansky, wanting to continue the fight despite the five knockdowns and trailing Holyfield by a wide margin on the judge's scorecards.

== Aftermath ==
Michael Moorer would retire shortly after the fight, eventually returning in 2000 though he was unable to match his previous success, never again fighting for the Heavyweight championship.

Almost immediately after his victory, there were rumours of the long-awaited unification match between Evander Holyfield and Lennox Lewis. With both Holyfield and Lewis now holding all of the major titles, the highly anticipated unification bout looked like it might finally take place. Holyfield would make the first defence of his third unified championship reign against Vaughn Bean, defeating him via unanimous decision, while Lewis faced mandatory challenger Željko Mavrović, also winning his fight via unanimous decision. After these victories, the Holyfield–Lewis fight was finally announced to take place in 1999.

== Undercard ==
Confirmed bouts:

== Broadcasting ==
Country	Broadcaster
Mexico	TV Azteca
United Kingdom	Sky Sports
United States	Showtime

Preceded by vs. Mike Tyson II	Evander Holyfield's bouts 8 November 1997	Succeeded by vs. Vaughn Bean
Preceded by vs. Vaughn Bean	Michael Moorer's bouts 8 November 1997	Succeeded by vs. Lorenzo Boyd
