= Mike Tyson vs. Evander Holyfield =

Boxing competition

Finally
- Date: November 9, 1996
- Venue: MGM Grand Garden Arena, Paradise, Nevada, U.S.
- Titles on the line: WBA heavyweight title

Tale of the tape
Boxer	Mike Tyson	Evander Holyfield
Nickname	Iron	The Real Deal
Hometown	Catskill, New York, U.S.	Atlanta, Georgia, U.S.
Purse	$30,000,000	$12,000,000
Pre-fight record	45–1 (39 KO)	32–3 (23 KO)
Age	30 years, 4 months	34 years
Height	5 ft 10 in (178 cm)	6 ft 2 1/2 in (189 cm)
Weight	222 lb (101 kg)	215 lb (98 kg)
Style	Orthodox	Orthodox
Recognition	WBA; Heavyweight Champion; Former Undisputed Heavyweight Champion	WBA; No. 2 Ranked Heavyweight; 2-division Undisputed world champion

Result
- Holyfield wins via 11th round TKO

Mike Tyson vs. Evander Holyfield, billed as Finally, was a professional boxing match fought between Evander Holyfield and Mike Tyson for the WBA heavyweight championship on November 9, 1996, at the MGM Grand Garden Arena in Paradise, Nevada. The bout was Tyson's first defence of the WBA title that he had won from Bruce Seldon on September 7 of that year.

The referee officiating the fight was Mitch Halpern. The fight was promoted by Don King Productions and carried on pay-per-view by Showtime.

The bout was the first fight pitting the two boxers against each other and it would be followed up with a controversial rematch.

Holyfield won by TKO in the eleventh round.

1.6 million people paid for the pay-per-view broadcast of this event, grossing $80 million.

== Background ==
In 1984, Holyfield qualified for the 1984 Summer Olympics team, while Tyson did not qualify, losing on points to Henry Tillman.

Afterward, Tyson took steps to become a power in the heavyweight division while Holyfield went on to win the bronze medal in Los Angeles. In 1986, Tyson became the youngest fighter ever to win a world heavyweight championship when he knocked Trevor Berbick out in the second round to win the WBC title as part of an ongoing series of fights designed to unify the belts of the WBA, WBC, and the IBF and create an undisputed world champion. The next year, Tyson won the other two championships to become the first fighter since Leon Spinks to be an undisputed world heavyweight champion.

Holyfield came up through the ranks of the cruiserweight division before making his name as a heavyweight. In what was still a relatively young division, cruiserweight — having only been sanctioned as a title-holding weight class since 1979 — Holyfield quickly became its first undisputed champion when he won all three major sanctioning bodies' titles. He moved up to heavyweight in 1988 and continued to work his way up the rankings, becoming the top contender of all three major sanctioning bodies. By 1990, Holyfield was looking to challenge Tyson and after some hard negotiating the two fighters would agree to a fight to be hosted by Donald Trump in Atlantic City, NJ.

Tyson's loss to Buster Douglas, which he had intended as a tune-up fight for the Holyfield match, derailed those plans. Holyfield was given the first shot at the new champion and won in a third-round knockout. Tyson, meanwhile, entered into a fight with Canadian heavyweight contender Donovan Ruddock with the winner to face Holyfield. However, a controversial ending to the fight, which Tyson won by technical knockout, led to an immediate rematch and further delayed the showdown between Tyson and Holyfield. After Tyson won decisively, a fight was signed for November 18, 1991. An injury and Tyson's subsequent conviction for rape in 1992 indefinitely shelved the fight, as Tyson was sentenced to six years in prison.

Holyfield, meanwhile, went on to reign as undisputed champion until losing to Riddick Bowe in November 1992. He would regain the WBA and IBF titles from Bowe in a rematch the following year, then lost them to Michael Moorer in 1994. Holyfield was then forced to retire due to a misdiagnosed heart condition, only to come back a year later, defeating Ray Mercer in 1995. He fought Bowe one more time in the fall, getting knocked out for the first time in his career, and then fought the former cruiserweight world champion Bobby Czyz and forced a stoppage when Czyz quit on his stool after the fifth round.

Tyson was released from prison in 1995 and resumed his career with great fanfare. He fought journeyman Peter McNeeley in his comeback fight and then, before a national television audience, knocked out undefeated contender Buster Mathis, Jr. The WBC installed him as its number one contender and ordered the winner of a fight between Oliver McCall, their champion who knocked out Lennox Lewis in 1994, and Frank Bruno, a veteran British contender who had fought and lost to Tyson during his first run as champion, to fight him in their next bout. Bruno defeated McCall by decision, but then was soundly beaten by Tyson within three rounds.

Tyson would be stripped of the title for agreeing to fight WBA champion Bruce Seldon in his next fight instead of Lewis, the top contender. He knocked Seldon out in the first round and a fight was set up with Holyfield, who despite his former championship pedigree was regarded as past his prime.

Prior to the fight, Holyfield prepared by employing an undefeated David Tua in his training camp as a sparring partner due to Tua having a style and build which was similar to Tyson's.

== The fights ==
=== Undercard ===
Showtime promoted the event as a heavyweight title tripleheader, as two other champions were defending their titles that night as well. In all, five (including Tyson's ) were contested for that night.

Undefeated WBC world minimumweight champion Ricardo Lopez knocked out contender Morgan Ndumo in the sixth round to retain his title.

WBA super bantamweight champion Antonio Cermeno defeated challenger Eddy Saenz after his opponent decided not to continue following the fifth round.

=== Martin vs Payne ===
The first event on the PPV card featured star women's boxer Christy Martin, who had gained some notoriety and was becoming a star; she defeated Bethany Payne by knockout in the first round.

=== Akinwande vs Zolkin ===
The first of the three heavyweight title fights followed. Henry Akinwande, a British fighter who defeated Jeremy Williams for the World Boxing Organization title Riddick Bowe vacated to set up the third and last fight with Holyfield, took on former NABF champion Alexander Zolkin. Akinwande emerged victorious with a tenth-round knockout in the first defence of his belt.

=== Moorer vs Botha ===
Finally: Michael Moorer vs. Francois Botha
- Title on the line: IBF heavyweight title

Tale of the tape
Boxer	Michael Moorer	Francois Botha
Nickname	"Double M"	"The White Buffalo"
Hometown	Brooklyn, New York, U.S.	Pretoria, Gauteng, South Africa
Purse	$2,000,000	$1,000,000
Pre-fight record	37–1 (30 KO)	35–0 (1) (21 KO)
Age	28 years, 11 months	28 years, 1 month
Height	6 ft 2 in (188 cm)	6 ft 2 in (188 cm)
Weight	219 lb (99 kg)	224 lb (102 kg)
Style	Orthodox	Orthodox
Recognition	IBF; Heavyweight Champion	IBF; No. 1 Ranked Heavyweight

Result
- Moorer wins by technical knockout in round 12

The last fight before the main event was contested for the IBF championship. The IBF title match was contested with Michael Moorer taking on Francois Botha. Moorer had defeated Axel Schulz earlier in 1996 for the title that had been stripped from lineal champion George Foreman; Botha had defeated Schulz in an earlier fight for the vacant title but the result was vacated following a doping violation.

==== The fight ====
Botha was wobbled late in the third round, causing a cut over his right eye. Moorer knocked down Botha twice in the eleventh round before having the challenger helpless on the ropes early in the final round prompting referee Mills Lane to wave it off.

At the time of the stoppage judges Glen Hamada and Chuck Giampa had scored 106–100 to Moorer, while Stuart Winston had it 103–104 for Botha.

Preceded by vs. Axel Schulz	Michael Moorer's bouts 9 November 1996	Succeeded by vs. Vaughn Bean
Preceded by vs. Axel Schulz	Francois Botha's bouts 9 November 1996	Succeeded by vs. James Stanton

=== Main Event ===
Ahead of the fight, the betting odds were 5 to 1 in favor of Tyson. Tyson came out fast and sent Holyfield reeling with his first solid punch. Holyfield, who had studied Tyson's style intensively, later explained that Tyson dipped to his left, from which position he usually loaded up a left hook, but on this occasion surprised Holyfield by firing a right cross. Holyfield tied Tyson up and revealed the first surprise of the fight — his superior strength — as he pushed Tyson backwards. Tyson would never seriously hurt Holyfield for the remainder of the fight. Holyfield defended effectively for the rest of round one and hammered Tyson with several counterpunches. After the end of the round, Tyson threw a punch after the bell; an unintimidated Holyfield retaliated. In the second, Holyfield drove Tyson into the ropes and stung him with a hard combination, and his strategy for the match became clear. As Tyson mainly threw one punch at a time, Holyfield blocked the first attack, then used his strength to clinch, and shove Tyson backwards. Keeping Tyson on the back foot minimized his power and affected his balance, and gave Holyfield the opportunity to come forward and score with combinations to the head. As the rounds passed, Tyson was unable to adjust, and found himself being thoroughly outboxed. In the fifth round, Tyson landed a fierce combination, his best of the match, and Holyfield was hurt.

In the sixth round, Tyson was cut by a headbutt that Halpern ruled to be an accidental clash of the fighters' heads. Then, as the round progressed, Holyfield caught Tyson with a left hook to the body that dropped him to the canvas. This was the first time Tyson had been knocked down since his lone defeat, and Holyfield continued parrying Tyson's charges and catching him with punches to the head.

With 15 seconds left in the seventh round, Tyson lunged at Holyfield as Holyfield came forward, resulting in another hard clash of heads. Tyson cried out in pain and his knees buckled, but again the referee judged the headbutt to be unintentional. Tyson was examined by the ring doctor, and tied Holyfield up for the rest of the round.

During the next two rounds, Tyson continued missing wild punches and absorbing counterpunches from Holyfield. At the end of the tenth round, a punch from Holyfield sent Tyson staggering across the ring. Holyfield chased him into the ropes and landed a series of devastating blows. By the sound of the bell, Tyson was out on his feet and defenseless, but his corner allowed him out for the eleventh. Holyfield quickly landed another brutal extended combination, sending Tyson back into the ropes. Halpern had seen enough, and he stopped the fight, giving Holyfield one of the most famous upset victories in the history of boxing.

== Aftermath ==
With his victory, Holyfield became the first fighter since Muhammad Ali to win the heavyweight championship for a third time. At the post-fight press conference, Tyson addressed Holyfield: "Thank you very much. I have the greatest respect for you." The fighters agreed to an immediate rematch set for May 1997.

== Undercard ==
Confirmed bouts:

Winner	Loser	Weight division/title belt(s) disputed	Result
(United States) Michael Moorer	(South Africa) Francois Botha	IBF World Heavyweight title	12th-round TKO.
(United Kingdom) Henry Akinwande	(Russia) Alexander Zolkin	WBO World Heavyweight title	10th-round TKO.
(United States) Christy Martin	(United States) Bethany Payne	Super lightweight (6 rounds)	1st-round TKO.
Preliminary bouts
(Mexico) Ricardo López	(South Africa) Morgan Ndumo	WBC World Strawweight title	6th-round TKO
(Venezuela) Antonio Cermeño	(Nicaragua) Eddy Sáenz	WBA World Super bantamweight title	5th-round RTD
Non-TV bouts
(United Kingdom) Scott Welch	(Argentina) Daniel Eduardo Neto	Heavyweight (8 rounds)	Unanimous decision
(France) Bruno Wartelle	(United States) Chuck Dairy	Lightweight (4 rounds)	1st-round TKO.

== Broadcasting ==
Country	Broadcaster
Australia	Sports Australia
Brazil	TV Globo
Canada	Viewers Choice
Mexico	Televisa
Philippines	RPN 9 (Via Satellite) / IBC 13 (Replay)
Thailand	Channel 3
United Kingdom	Sky Box Office
United States	Showtime Sports & Entertainment Television

== See also ==
- Evander Holyfield vs. Mike Tyson II

Preceded by vs. Bruce Seldon	Mike Tyson's bouts 9 November 1996	Succeeded by Rematch
Preceded by vs. Bobby Czyz	Evander Holyfield's bouts 9 November 1996	Succeeded by Rematch
Awards
Preceded by Saman Sorjaturong vs. Humberto González	The Ring Fight of the Year; 1996	Succeeded by Arturo Gatti vs. Gabriel Ruelas
Preceded by Willy Salazar vs. Danny Romero	The Ring Upset of the Year; 1996	Succeeded by Kostya Tszyu vs. Vince Phillips
