= Evander Holyfield vs. Mike Tyson II =

Boxing competition

The Sound and the Fury
- Date: June 28, 1997
- Venue: MGM Grand Garden Arena, Paradise, Nevada, U.S.
- Title on the line: WBA heavyweight title

Tale of the tape
Boxer	Evander Holyfield	Mike Tyson
Nickname	The Real Deal	Iron
Hometown	Atlanta, Georgia, U.S.	Catskill, New York, U.S.
Purse	$35,000,000	$30,000,000
Pre-fight record	33–3 (24 KO)	45–2 (39 KO)
Age	34 years, 8 months	30 years, 11 months
Height	6 ft 2 1/2 in (189 cm)	5 ft 10 in (178 cm)
Weight	218 lb (99 kg)	218 lb (99 kg)
Style	Orthodox	Orthodox
Recognition	WBA; Heavyweight Champion; The Ring pound-for-pound No. 9 ranked fighter 2-division undisputed world champion	WBA; No. 1 Ranked Heavyweight; Former undisputed heavyweight champion

Result
- Holyfield wins via 3rd-round disqualification

Evander Holyfield vs. Mike Tyson II, billed as The Sound and the Fury and afterwards infamously referred to as The Bite Fight, was a professional boxing match contested between the champion Evander Holyfield and the challenger Mike Tyson on June 28, 1997, for the WBA World Heavyweight Championship. It achieved notoriety as one of the most bizarre fights in boxing history after Tyson bit off a part of Holyfield's ear. Tyson was disqualified from the match and lost his boxing license, though it was later reinstated. When asked why he bit off Holyfield's ear, his response was "I just wanted to kill him". Tyson admitted that the two bites were in retaliation from the head butt Tyson took in their previous fight.

The fight took place at the MGM Grand Garden Arena on the Las Vegas Strip. Mills Lane was the fight's referee, who was brought in as a replacement after Mitch Halpern, who refereed the 1996 match between the boxers, stepped aside.

== Background ==
Tyson and Holyfield had fought seven months earlier, on November 9, 1996, at the same venue in Las Vegas. Tyson had been making his first defense of the WBA championship he had won from Bruce Seldon in a first-round knockout. Holyfield, despite being a former champion, was a significant underdog entering that match as his performance had been rather lackluster in several fights since having returned to fighting in 1995 after a brief retirement. However, Holyfield surprised Tyson by controlling the 1996 contest and knocked him down in the sixth round. Halpern stopped the fight in the eleventh round, giving Holyfield an upset victory.

When the 1997 fight was signed, Halpern was again assigned to be the referee. Tyson's management objected, with the official reason being that they wanted a different referee for the rematch. It was believed, though never confirmed, that the actual reason why Tyson and crew objected to Halpern's assignment was that Holyfield had clashed heads with Tyson several times during the course of the first fight and Halpern ruled them all accidental. The Nevada State Athletic Commission ruled against the Tyson camp, but Halpern willingly withdrew from the fight days before because he felt his presence would be a distraction. Mills Lane was assigned as the backup referee. Although Tyson wasn't aware at the time, Mills Lane was considered a friend of Holyfield.

== The fight ==
Holyfield won the first three rounds. At 2:19 of the first round, an overhand right punch from Holyfield stunned Tyson, but Tyson fought back, immediately pushing Holyfield backwards. At 32 seconds into the second round, Holyfield ducked under a right punch from Tyson. In doing so, he head-butted Tyson, producing a large cut over the latter's right eye (although trainer Ritchie Giachetti believed the injury happened in the first round). Tyson had repeatedly complained about head-butting in the first bout between the two fighters. Upon reviewing replays, referee Mills Lane stated that the head-butts were unintentional and non-punishable.

Excerpt from Showtime Championship Boxing's broadcast of the fight, showcasing first and second bites from Tyson (black shorts) on Holyfield (black and white shorts), and the subsequent response from Lane (blue top).

As the third round was about to begin, Tyson came out of his corner without his mouthpiece. Lane ordered Tyson back to his corner to insert it. Tyson inserted his mouthpiece, got back into position, and the match resumed. Tyson began the third round with a furious attack. With forty seconds remaining in the round, Holyfield got Tyson in a clinch, and Tyson rolled his head above Holyfield's shoulder and bit Holyfield on his right ear. A one-inch piece of cartilage was torn from the top of Holyfield's ear, which Tyson spat out onto the ring apron.

Holyfield leapt into the air in pain and spun in a circle, bleeding profusely from the bite wound. Lane stopped the action, but Tyson managed to rush Holyfield from behind and shove him into his corner. Lane separated the men, moved Tyson to a neutral corner, and went back to check on an enraged Holyfield. The fight would be delayed for the next few minutes as Lane decided on what to do.

Lane called Marc Ratner, the chairman of Nevada's athletic commission, up to the ring apron and informed him that because Tyson had bitten Holyfield's ear, he was going to disqualify him and end the fight. Meanwhile, ringside physician Flip Homansky was performing his own check on the champion, and Lane decided to defer to him. Once Homansky cleared Holyfield to continue the fight, Lane decided to allow the bout to continue, but not before penalizing Tyson with a two-point deduction for the bite, as per rules regarding any intentional foul causing an injury. As Lane explained the decision to Tyson and his cornermen, Tyson asserted that the injury to Holyfield's ear was the result of a punch. "Bullshit," Lane retorted.

During another clinch, Tyson bit Holyfield's left ear. Holyfield threw his hands around to escape the clinch and jumped back. Tyson's second bite just scarred Holyfield's ear. At the time of the second bite, Lane failed to notice it and did not stop the match, and both combatants continued fighting until time expired. The men walked back to their respective corners, and when the second bite was discovered, the match was halted again.

=== Post-fight unrest ===
After the match was stopped, Tyson went on a rampage at Holyfield and his trainer Brooks while they were still in their corner. Lane told Tyson's corner that he was disqualifying Tyson for biting Holyfield. After the two fighters went to their corners, Tyson ran at Holyfield's corner. The two campaigns tussled, with Tyson throwing a punch at an officer. Lane was interviewed and said that the bites were intentional. He had told Tyson not to bite anymore, and said Tyson asked to be disqualified by disobeying that order. Holyfield left the ring seconds after the interview, which gave the fans and audience the hint that the match was over. When asked why he thought Tyson bit his ear, Holyfield later explained: "He knew he was going to get knocked out; that he chose to lose through disqualification than to beaten like that."

Reporters then interviewed Tyson's instructor, John Horne, who was upset about Lane's decision. Horne said, "They will have to explain that. I do not agree with it but it is what it is ... all I know is Mike Tyson has a cut in his eye." Horne also attempted to justify Tyson's biting by claiming it was in retaliation for uncalled headbutts by Holyfield, stating "One headbutt may be accidental, fifteen is not."

Twenty-five minutes after the brawl ended, announcer Jimmy Lennon Jr. read the decision: "Ladies and gentlemen, this bout has been stopped at the end of round number three. The referee in charge, Mills Lane, disqualifies Mike Tyson for biting Evander Holyfield in both ears, the winner by way of disqualification and still the WBA Heavyweight Champion of the World, Evander 'the Real Deal' Holyfield!" As a result, Holyfield remained the WBA World Heavyweight Champion.

Tyson, during his post match interview, asserted that his bites were in retaliation for the headbutts from Holyfield just as Horne had said.

Later, during post-match interviews, Tyson was walking back to his locker room when a fan from the venue tossed a bottle of water in his direction. Tyson, his instructor, and a pain manager climbed over a temporary railing and up into the stands, made obscene gestures to the crowd, and made their way up the side of a stairway. Tyson had to be restrained as he was led off. When interviewed about his championship and the incident with Mike Tyson, Holyfield said he already forgave Tyson for biting him.

The commentators for the Sky Sports broadcast of the bout, Ian Darke and Glenn McCrory, noted that no one had been disqualified in a title bout for more than 50 years, correctly estimating that the last disqualification was during a bout between Joe Louis and Buddy Baer in 1941, where Baer was disqualified after his cornermen refused to leave the ring in protest of what they believed was a late hit. They also compared the bout to The Long Count Fight and the Phantom Punch incident.

== Aftermath ==
As a result of biting Holyfield on both ears and other behavior, Tyson's boxing license was revoked by the Nevada State Athletic Commission and he was fined $3 million plus legal fees. By law, the commission could not fine him more than 10% of his purse. On appeal, the commission voted 4–1 to reinstate Tyson's license on October 18, 1998. Tyson lost his license again in 2002 in a 4-1 vote by the Nevada State Athletic Commission, following controversy at a press-conference brawl with Lennox Lewis.

The match generated a total revenue of $180 million (in 1997 USD), from live gate, pay-per-view, closed-circuit telecasts, foreign television rights, and casino profits.

After both men retired from boxing, they became close friends. On August 9, 2017, Holyfield was formally inducted into the Nevada Boxing Hall of Fame. Tyson, presenting for the ceremony, called the opportunity to award Holyfield a "privilege and high honor".

== Undercard ==
Confirmed bouts:

Winner	Loser	Weight division/title belt(s) disputed	Result
(Mexico) Julio César Chávez	(United States) Larry LaCoursiere	Welterweight (10 rounds)	Unanimous decision
(Mexico) Miguel Ángel González	(Philippines) Roberto Granciosa	Welterweight (10 rounds)	3rd round RTD
(United States) Christy Martin	(United States) Andrea DeShong	Light welterweight (8 rounds)	7th round TKO
Preliminary bouts
(United States) Lonnie Bradley	(United States) John Williams	WBO World Middleweight title	8th round TKO
Non-TV bouts
(United States) Billy Wright	(Mexico) Martin Lopez	Heavyweight (8 rounds)	4th round KO
(United States) Roberto Garcia	(Mexico) Angel Aldama	Lightweight (8 rounds)	5th round TKO
(United States) Nate Jones	(United States) Willie Chapman	Heavyweight (4 rounds)	Unanimous decision

== Broadcasting ==
Country	Broadcaster
Thailand	Channel 5
United Kingdom	Sky Box Office
United States	Showtime Sports & Entertainment Television
Brazil	TV Globo

== In popular culture ==
- The lyrics to the 2013 Beyoncé song "Drunk in Love" mention the fight in a section rapped by Jay-Z: "Beat the box up, like Mike in '97, I bite."
- In the video game Fallout 2, the final opponent faced in the boxing sidequest is "The Masticator", a boxer who is an obvious stand in for Tyson with a known habit of biting off the ears of his opponents, including a second boxer representing Holyfield. If the player is skilled enough in boxing, they can in turn bite his own ear off, but only if the Masticator has already bitten off theirs.
- A flashback scene in the 2006 horror-comedy film Scary Movie 4 parodies the fight. Cindy Campbell (Anna Faris) represents Holyfield and Tyson is portrayed by character Tiffany Stone (Michael McDonald).
- On October 16, 2009, The Oprah Winfrey Show featured an interview with Tyson and Holyfield, and included the former apologizing to Holyfield, saying "it's been a pleasure passing through life, being acquainted with you." Holyfield accepted Tyson's overture and forgave him.
- In the 2008 documentary Tyson, Tyson claimed the bite was in retaliation for Holyfield's headbutting.
- In 2022, Tyson and Holyfield teamed up to produce edible cannabis sweets in the shape of Holyfield's ear, called "Holy Ears", and created a comedic Christmas advertisement to promote the product.
- The fight was featured as part of the series 30 for 30 episode, "Chasing Tyson."

Preceded by First Match	Evander Holyfield's bouts 28 June 1997	Succeeded by vs. Michael Moorer II
Preceded by First Match	Mike Tyson's bouts 28 June 1997	Succeeded by vs. Francois Botha
