= Mike Tyson vs. Francois Botha =

Boxing competition

- Date: January 16, 1999
- Venue: MGM Grand Garden Arena, Paradise, Nevada, US

Tale of the tape
Boxer	Mike Tyson	Francois Botha
Nickname	Iron	The White Buffalo
Hometown	Catskill, New York, US	Pretoria, Gauteng, South Africa
Purse	$10,000,000	$1,850,000
Pre-fight record	45–3 (39 KO)	39–1 (24 KO)
Age	32 years, 6 months	30 years, 3 months
Height	5 ft 10 in (178 cm)	6 ft 2 in (188 cm)
Weight	223 lb (101 kg)	233 lb (106 kg)
Style	Orthodox	Orthodox
Recognition	WBA; No. 5 Ranked Heavyweight; Former undisputed heavyweight champion	IBF; No. 2 Ranked Heavyweight

Result
- Tyson wins via 5th-round KO

Mike Tyson vs. Francois Botha was a professional boxing match on January 16, 1999. Tyson won the match by knocking out Botha in the fifth round.

== Background ==
After Tyson's controversial fight with Evander Holyfield on June 28, 1997 which saw Tyson get disqualified in the third round after twice biting Holyfield's ears, the Nevada Athletic Commission fined Tyson $3 million and revoked his boxing license. Tyson's ban would ultimately last a total of 15 months and 10 days with it finally ending after a five-man committee voted in favor of reinstating Tyson by a vote of 4–1 on October 18, 1998. After much speculation over who Tyson would face in his return bout, it was officially announced that Tyson would face former IBF Heavyweight champion Francois Botha on January 16, 1999. Despite his long layoff, Tyson was forthright about his chances of collecting a victory over Botha by way of knockout. On one occasion, Tyson stated "I am going right at him and I expect him to go down cold. I expect him to die." The comment would cause some controversy, with some in the boxing world claiming that Tyson had gone too far. Botha also was confident that he could defeat Tyson, claiming that he would earn the victory by way of "seventh round knockout".

== The fight ==
Through the fight's first four rounds, Botha both outboxed and outpointed the rusty Tyson. In the first round Tyson had trouble connecting with his punches and Botha was able to dodge most of Tyson's attempts. With 10 seconds left in the round, Tyson was able to get a hold of Botha's left arm. Tyson refused to let go as the round came to an end causing Botha to try to punch his way free from Tyson's grip by using his free right hand. Referee Richard Steele tried in vain to separate the two fighters who were now throwing punches at each other after the bell. Both Tyson and Botha's corners, along with MGM Grand security rushed into the ring and were finally able to separate the two men. The melee caused the beginning of round two to be briefly delayed as Steele issued warnings to both men about fouling. After the warnings, the fight was continued with Tyson coming at Botha with his jab. Botha then clinched with Tyson who again grabbed a hold of Botha's left arm causing Botha to complain to Steele that Tyson was trying to break his arm. Steele issued another warning to Tyson to not twist Botha's arm and the fight continued. Shortly after, however, Tyson grabbed hold of Botha's arm for a third time forcing Steele to again separate the fighters and issue another warning to Tyson. Almost immediately after, Tyson again clinched Botha. As Steele separated the two, Tyson shoved Botha with his left hand, leading to Steele calling time and deducting a point from Tyson. Botha would continue to fight well, winning both rounds 3 and 4 on the judge's scorecards. In round 4, Botha even taunted Tyson by dropping his arms and challenging him to land a punch. Botha was having another good round in round 5, but with 12 seconds remaining, Tyson was able to land a short right hand that dropped Botha to the canvas. Botha twice attempted to get up and was nearly able to answer Steele's count at nine, but he went right back down and Steele stopped the fight at 2:59 and Tyson was awarded the knockout victory.

== Aftermath ==
Tyson would follow his victory with a no contest against Orlin Norris (due to Tyson injuring Norris after the bell) and easy wins over Julius Francis and Lou Savarese that got him back into contention. After another no contest against Andrew Golota (due to Tyson testing positive for cannabis after the fight) and win over Brian Nielsen, Tyson would eventually earn one last title shot against Lennox Lewis but was knocked out in the eighth round.

The following year, Botha would get an opportunity at Lewis' titles, challenging the champion on July 15, 2000. Botha would not have as good a showing as he did against Tyson, being knocked out in the second round by Lewis

== Undercard ==
Confirmed bouts:

== Broadcasting ==
Country	Broadcaster
Argentina	Azul TV (Canal 9)
Australia	Sky Channel
Brazil	TV Globo
Mexico	Televisa
United States	Showtime

Preceded by vs. Evander Holyfield II	Mike Tyson's bouts 16 January 1999	Succeeded by vs. Orlin Norris
Preceded by vs. David Cherry	Francois Botha's bouts 16 January 1999	Succeeded by vs. Shannon Briggs
