= Disqualification (boxing) =

Rule in boxing

A disqualification (abbreviated DQ) is a term used when a bout is stopped short of knockout or judges' decision because, intentionally, one or both contestants have repeatedly or flagrantly fouled an opponent or violated other rules. The disqualified boxer automatically loses the bout to the opponent. If both are disqualified, (termed a double disqualification) the result is usually declared a no contest regardless of round.

Most disqualifications happen for repeated intentional fouling such as headbutting, low blows, rabbit punches, biting and the like. Typically, a referee will first verbally warn offenders or direct a point deduction first before disqualifying a boxer. However, contestants may be disqualified without warning for particularly egregious conduct such as kicking a downed opponent, hair pulling, or using loaded gloves. Secondly, violation of other rules by a fighter's corner, such as cornermen entering the ring or striking the opponent can result in disqualification even though such behavior is not strictly under the fighter's control. A boxer may also be disqualified if the referee deems that they are not fighting, or holding excessively.

Disqualification occurs solely at the referee's discretion and no fouled contestant is automatically entitled to such a result.

== Examples ==
A famous DQ in boxing occurred in the 1997 Holyfield–Tyson II match, when Mike Tyson was disqualified in the 3rd round for biting Evander Holyfield's ears.

== See also ==
- 10-point system
