= Billy Wright (boxer) =

American boxer (born 1964)

Personal information
- Nickname: Bronco
- Nationality: American
- Born: Billy Wright; December 10, 1964 (age 61) Morenci, AZ
- Height: 6 ft 4 in (1.93 m)
- Weight: Heavyweight

Boxing career
- Stance: Orthodox

Boxing record
- Total fights: 56
- Wins: 52
- Win by KO: 43
- Losses: 4
- Draws: 0
- No contests: 0

"Bronco" Billy Wright (born December 10, 1964) is an American former professional boxer who fought in the Heavyweight division. Throughout his pro career he scored 29 first-round knockouts. He was a sparring partner for George Foreman in his championship fight with then undefeated heavyweight world champion Michael Moorer.

Vacant Title last held by Ondřej Pála	PABA Heavyweight Interim Champion; 28 January 2012 – March 2014; Vacated	Vacant Title next held by Joseph Parker
