= Evander Holyfield vs. Michael Moorer =

Boxing competition

- Date: April 22, 1994
- Venue: Caesars Palace, Paradise, Nevada, U.S.
- Title(s) on the line: WBA and IBF heavyweight titles

Tale of the tape
| Boxer | Evander Holyfield | Michael Moorer |
| Nickname | The Real Deal | Double M |
| Hometown | Atlanta, Georgia, U.S. | Monessen, Pennsylvania, U.S. |
| Purse | $12,000,000 | $3,500,000 |
| Pre-fight record | 30–1 (22 KO) | 34–0 (30 KO) |
| Age | 31 years, 6 months | 26 years, 5 months |
| Height | 6 ft 2 1/2 in (189 cm) | 6 ft 2 in (188 cm) |
| Weight | 214 lb (97 kg) | 214 lb (97 kg) |
| Style | Orthodox | Southpaw |
| Recognition | WBA and IBF; Heavyweight Champion; The Ring; No. 1 Ranked Heavyweight; The Ring pound-for-pound No. 4 ranked fighter 2-division undisputed world champion | WBA/IBF; No. 1 Ranked Heavyweight; The Ring; No. 4 Ranked Heavyweight |

Result
- Moorer defeated Holyfield via Majority Decision

Evander Holyfield vs. Michael Moorer was a professional boxing match contested on April 22, 1994, for the WBA and IBF heavyweight championships.

== Background ==
After defeating Riddick Bowe in a closely contested rematch to regain his WBA, IBF and Lineal Heavyweight titles, Holyfield had hoped for a unification match with the WBC Heavyweight Champion Lennox Lewis. Instead, the WBA and IBF demanded Holyfield face the mandatory challenger, undefeated southpaw Michael Moorer, who had previously held versions of the lightly regarded WBO belt at both Heavyweight and Light heavyweight.

This was Holyfield's first bout with Don Turner as his trainer, who also served as his cutman. Holyfield dismissed his longtime cutman, Ace Marotta, as well previous trainer Emanuel Steward, rather than pay him $25,000 to be in his corner.

Holyfield was a 2 to 1 favourite going into the bout and was looking ahead to a potential title-unification match against WBC champion Lennox Lewis.

== The fight ==
In the second round, Moorer was in control of the fight until Holyfield caught him with a left hook that dropped Moorer to the canvas. Moorer beat the count of referee Mills Lane and was able to continue. Moorer would open up a cut over Holyfield's left eye in round five which troubled the champion throughout the bout, leaving him susceptible to Moorer's accurate right jab and sharp left hooks. Moorer would land more than 100 more punches than Holyfield during the bout, most of them jabs.

In a shocking upset, Moorer would defeat Holyfield via majority decision with judges Jerry Roth and Chuck Giampa giving Moorer the victory by the scores of 115–114 and 116–112 respectively, while Dalby Shirley scored the fight even at 114–114, making Moorer the first southpaw to ever win a world heavyweight title.

HBO's unofficial scorer Harold Lederman scored the fight 114-113 for Holyfield while the Chicago Tribune also had the bout for the defending champion, 117-111. Ed Schuyler Jr. of the Associated Press scored the fight 118-111 for Moorer.

=== Scoring of the Knockdown in the 2nd Round ===
Though earning a knockdown during a fight would usually result in a round win for the fighter, plus one point, Judge Roth scored the second round even at 10–10 instead of 10–8, which would have made the fight a majority decision for the unified champion, or 10-9, which would result in a split draw by which Holyfield would have kept his titles. Holyfield's manager Shelly Finkel would protest the round, but the decision was upheld.

The Association of Boxing Commissions later amended their rules to make it mandatory for judges to score a round 10-8 following a knockdown "unless there is an unquestionable, outstanding domination from the boxer that was knocked down," at which point the round can be scored 10-9 for the fighter who knocked down their opponent. A 10-10 round is no longer permitted following a knockdown.

== Aftermath ==
Evander Holyfield was hospitalized after the fight for dehydration and a rotator-cuff injury. While at the hospital, a kidney bruise was found and he was given large amounts of liquid to help treat the injury. However, Holyfield was soon found to have a heart problem after his lungs filled due to his heart not being able to pump the fluids out. As a result, Holyfield announced his retirement only five days after the fight on April 27, 1994. Holyfield's retirement, however, would be brief as he would return the following year to defeat Ray Mercer.

After Moorer's victory there was talk of a potential Michael Moorer–Lennox Lewis fight. However, Moorer instead chose to put his newly won titles on the line against 45-year-old ex-Heavyweight champion George Foreman. Though Moorer was ahead on the judges scorecards, Foreman was able to land a short right hand to Moorer's chin, earning the victory by way of knockout and ending Moorer's first reign as champion.

On November 11, 1997, Holyfield and Moorer would meet in a rematch. By this time, Holyfield had regained the WBA Heavyweight title by twice defeating Mike Tyson while Moorer had regained the vacant IBF Heavyweight title after defeating Axel Schulz. This time it would be Holyfield who would earn the victory, sending Moorer to the canvas five times before Mitch Halpern stopped the fight after round 8 and awarded Holyfield the victory via referee technical decision.

== Undercard ==
Confirmed bouts:

== Broadcasting ==
| Country | Broadcaster |
|---|---|
| Philippines | World TV 21 |
| United Kingdom | Sky Sports |
| United States | HBO |

| Preceded by vs. Riddick Bowe II | Evander Holyfield's bouts 22 April 1994 | Succeeded by vs. Ray Mercer |
| Preceded by vs. Mike Evans | Michael Moorer's bouts 22 April 1994 | Succeeded by vs. George Foreman |
