= Don Turner =

American boxing trainer

Don Turner is a boxing trainer.

== Biography ==
He is well known for his work with Evander Holyfield during the late 1990s, specifically during Holyfield's two wins over Mike Tyson. He was also at Holyfield's side when he fought Lennox Lewis. Turner worked with Heavyweight contender Michael Grant and most recently with rising prospect John Duddy. Don Turner has worked with or trained more than 20 world boxing champions and countless top ranked contenders.

== Cutman Incident ==
He is famously known as the man who convinced Evander Holyfield that the cutman is "the biggest scam in boxing." During the 1994 heavyweight championship bout against Michael Moorer, Holyfield suffered a cut above his left eye which kept reopening during the match, affecting his vision. The lack of a cutman is thought to have been a determining factor that cost Holyfield the match.
