= Vaughn Bean =

American boxer

Personal information
- Nicknames: Shake & Bake; Vicious
- Born: Vaughn Bean; September 3, 1974 (age 52) Chicago, Illinois, U.S.
- Height: 5 ft 11 in (180 cm)
- Weight: Heavyweight

Boxing career
- Reach: 76 in (193 cm)
- Stance: Orthodox

Boxing record
- Total fights: 59
- Wins: 45
- Win by KO: 34
- Losses: 6
- Draws: 0

Vaughn Bean (born September 3, 1974) is an American former professional boxer. Nicknamed "Shake & Bake", Bean challenged twice for world heavyweight titles in 1997 and 1998.

== Professional career ==
Bean began his career with 27 victories over extremely limited competition, lining up a shot at IBF Heavyweight title holder Michael Moorer in 1997. At the time, Bean was a virtual unknown to the boxing public but put up a good effort against Moorer, losing a close majority decision.

After four victories over marginal competition, Bean secured another title shot against Evander Holyfield for the WBA and IBF Heavyweight titles. Bean again lost the decision. Bean again went on another synthetic winning streak, pounding out 11 consecutive wins. Yet again, he secured another major fight, this time against Vitali Klitschko. Klitchko controlled the fight, and took out the durable Bean via a TKO in the 11th round.

In 2004, Bean dropped decisions to Tony Thompson and Yanqui Diaz. In 2005, he dropped a decision to rising star Alexander Dimitrenko.

== Professional boxing record ==
45 Wins (34 knockouts, 11 decisions), 6 Losses (1 knockout, 5 decisions)
Result	Record	Opponent	Type	Round	Date	Location	Notes
Loss	19-0	(Ukraine) Alexander Dimitrenko	UD	10	28/09/2005	Altona, Hamburg, Germany	
Win	19-21-2	(United States) Ken Murphy	UD	6	11/02/2005	(United States) Merrionette Park, Illinois, U.S.	
Loss	12-1	(Cuba) Yanqui Diaz	SD	10	12/11/2004	(United States) Green Bay, Wisconsin, U.S.	
Loss	23-1	(United States) Tony Thompson	UD	10	11/09/2004	Montreal, Quebec, Canada	
Win	2-8	(United States) Anthony Riddick	TKO	2	15/11/2003	(United States) Hammond, Indiana, U.S.	Referee stopped the bout at 1:15 of the second round.
Win	6-24	(United States) David Cherry	TKO	1	19/10/2003	(United States) Terre Haute, Indiana, U.S.	Referee stopped the bout at 1:32 of the first round.
Loss	30-1	(Ukraine) Vitali Klitschko	TKO	11	08/02/2002	Braunschweig, Niedersachsen, Germany	WBA Intercontinental Heavyweight Title. Referee stopped the bout at 1:40 of the 11th round.
Win	18-8	(United States) Kenny Craven	KO	1	08/12/2001	(United States) Wilmington, Delaware, U.S.	
Win	10-9-2	(United States) Larry Carlisle	TKO	2	22/09/2001	(United States) Newark, New Jersey, U.S.	
Win	25-10	(United States) Don Normand	TKO	2	12/06/2001	(United States) Wilmington, Delaware, U.S.	
Win	20-18-1	(United States) Abdul Muhaymin	UD	10	12/01/2001	(United States) Atlantic City, New Jersey, U.S.	
Win	14-9	(Ivory Coast) Onebo Maxime	TKO	2	05/12/2000	(United States) Wilmington, Delaware, U.S.	
Win	8-7-2	(United States) Robert Smith	UD	8	07/10/2000	(United States) Uncasville, Connecticut, U.S.	
Win	12-12-1	(United States) Jimmy Haynes	KO	1	29/07/2000	(United States) Atlantic City, New Jersey, U.S.	
Win	14-14-2	(United States) Tim Ray	KO	1	28/04/2000	(United States) Philadelphia, Pennsylvania, U.S.	
Win	13-5-2	(United States) Terry Porter	PTS	10	17/03/2000	(United States) Atlantic City, New Jersey, U.S.	
Win	17-80-2	(United States) Danny Wofford	DQ	5	11/12/1999	(United States) Springfield, Virginia, U.S.	
Win	25-40	(United States) Lorenzo Boyd	TKO	2	24/07/1999	(United States) South Toms River, New Jersey, U.S.	
Loss	35-3	(United States) Evander Holyfield	UD	12	19/09/1998	(United States) Atlanta, Georgia, U.S.	For IBF and WBA heavyweight titles
Win	6-7	(United States) Lamont Burgin	TKO	3	18/04/1998	(United States) Alexandria, Virginia, U.S.	
Win	11-8	(United States) Isaac Brown	TKO	2	30/01/1998	(United States) Newark, New Jersey, U.S.	Referee stopped the bout at 1:00 of the second round.
Win	15-21-1	(United States) Kimmuel Odum	TKO	2	18/12/1997	(United States) Newark, New Jersey, U.S.	
Win	6-6	(United States) Bryant Smith	TKO	1	29/11/1997	(United States) Vineland, New Jersey, U.S.	
Loss	38-1	(United States) Michael Moorer	MD	12	29/03/1997	(United States) Las Vegas, Nevada, U.S.	For IBF heavyweight title
Win	8-14	(United States) Earl Talley	TKO	1	14/12/1996	(United States) Atlantic City, New Jersey, U.S.	
Win	8-13	(United States) Lou Turchiarelli	TKO	1	20/11/1996	(United States) Newark, New Jersey, U.S.	
Win	7-6-1	(United States) Ron McCarthy	TKO	6	18/06/1996	(United States) Wilmington, Delaware, U.S.	Referee stopped the bout at 2:37 of the sixth round.
Win	5-3-1	(United States) Michael Benning	TKO	1	03/05/1996	(United States) Somerset, New Jersey, U.S.	Referee stopped the bout at 0:57 of the first round.
Win	7-15-1	(United States) Doug Davis	TKO	7	15/11/1995	(United States) Newark, New Jersey, U.S.	Referee stopped the bout at 1:53 of the seventh round.
Win	11-15-2	(United States) Mike DeVito	KO	1	19/06/1995	(United States) Philadelphia, Pennsylvania, U.S.	
Win	3-6	(United States) Bradley Rone	UD	6	06/06/1995	(United States) Philadelphia, Pennsylvania, U.S.	
Win	2-5	(United States) Harold Johnson	TKO	1	10/05/1995	(United States) Chicago, Illinois, U.S.	
Win	5-15-1	(United States) Dave Slaughter	KO	1	20/04/1995	(United States) Chicago, Illinois, U.S.	
Win	8-11	(United States) Max Key	TKO	1	10/02/1995	(United States) Philadelphia, Pennsylvania, U.S.	Referee stopped the bout at 2:03 of the first round.
Win	4-5-1	(United States) Kevin Parker	DQ	4	02/12/1994	(United States) Philadelphia, Pennsylvania, U.S.	
Win	3-2-1	(United States) James Drubin	TKO	3	17/11/1994	(United States) Somerset, New Jersey, U.S.	
Win	5-4-2	(United States) Maurice Harris	KO	3	29/10/1994	(United States) Atlantic City, New Jersey, U.S.	
Win	6-23-1	(United States) Jeff Bowman	TKO	1	21/07/1994	(United States) Hasbrouck Heights, New Jersey, U.S.	
Win	3-4	(United States) Leonard Long	TKO	2	17/05/1994	(United States) Atlantic City, New Jersey, U.S.	
Win	8-14	(United States) Howard Kelly	TKO	3	12/04/1994	(United States) Philadelphia, Pennsylvania, U.S.	
Win	6-8-2	(United States) Marion Wilson	UD	6	26/02/1994	(United States) Atlantic City, New Jersey, U.S.	
Win	7-4	(United States) Warren Williams	TKO	2	23/11/1993	(United States) Philadelphia, Pennsylvania, U.S.	
Win	0-3	(United States) Tim Richards	PTS	6	01/07/1993	(United States) Gary, Indiana, U.S.	
Win	0-1	(United States) Matt Davis	TKO	1	21/05/1993	(United States) Gary, Indiana, U.S.	
Win	0-7-1	(United States) Brian Morgan	PTS	6	23/04/1993	(United States) Countryside, Illinois, U.S.	
Win	3-35-1	(United States) James Wilder	PTS	4	26/03/1993	(United States) Countryside, Illinois, U.S.	
Win	--	(United States) Matt Davis	TKO	1	26/02/1993	(United States) Countryside, Illinois, U.S.	Referee stopped the bout at 1:29 of the first round.
Win	0-1	(United States) Brian Johnson	TKO	3	19/02/1993	(United States) Countryside, Illinois, U.S.	
Win	3-28	(United States) James Virgil Holly	KO	1	22/01/1993	(United States) Countryside, Illinois, U.S.	Holly knocked out at 2:39 of the first round.
Win	0-7	(United States) Nate Spears	TKO	1	11/12/1992	(United States) Countryside, Illinois, U.S.	
Win	--	Dwight Ramsey	KO	2	23/10/1992	(United States) Countryside, Illinois, U.S.	
