= Michael Moorer =

American boxer (born 1967)

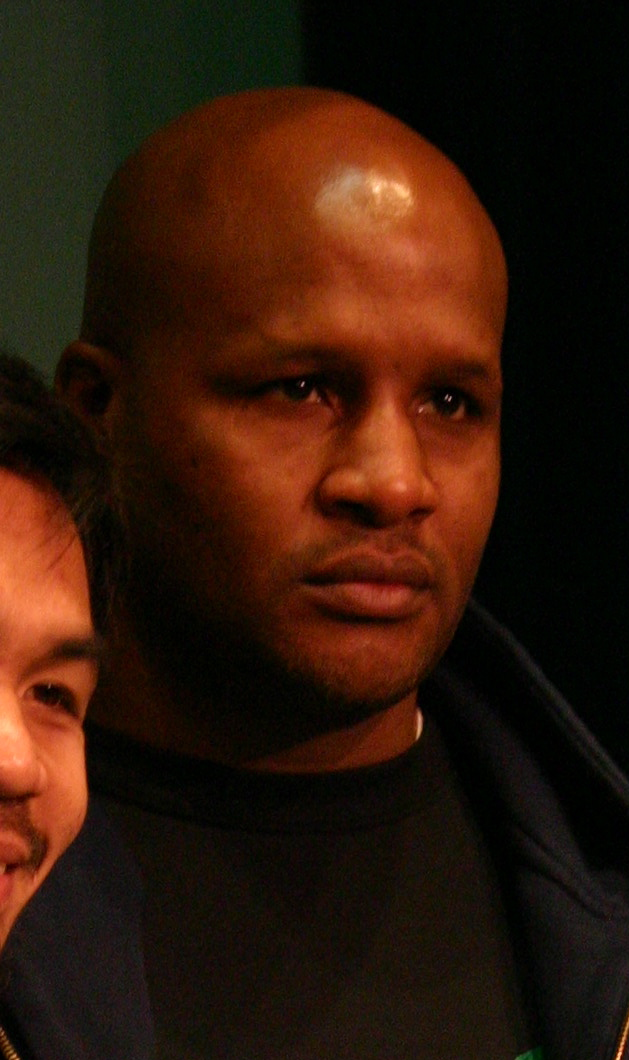
- Moorer in 2009

Personal information
- Nickname: Double M
- Nationality: American
- Born: Michael Lee Moorer; November 12, 1967 (age 58) Brooklyn, New York, U.S.
- Height: 6 ft 2 in (188 cm)
- Weight: Light heavyweight; Heavyweight

Boxing career
- Reach: 76 in (193 cm)
- Stance: Southpaw

Boxing record
- Total fights: 57
- Wins: 52
- Win by KO: 40
- Losses: 4
- Draws: 1

Michael Lee Moorer (born November 12, 1967) is an American former professional boxer who competed from 1988 to 2008. He won a world championship on four occasions in two weight classes, having held the WBO light heavyweight title from 1988 to 1991; compiling 22 straight KOs in 22 fights and the WBO heavyweight title from 1992 to 1993; the unified WBA, IBF and lineal heavyweight titles in 1994; and regained the IBF heavyweight title again from 1996 to 1997 becoming a three-time heavyweight world champion.

Michael Moorer was an undefeated his first 35 professional bouts, and the first southpaw to win a heavyweight title. He captured the WBO light heavyweight title in 1988 which he defended 9 times. In 1991, Moorer moved up to Heavyweight winning the vacant WBO heavyweight title from Bert Cooper via TKO in 1992. He went on to beat Evander Holyfield for the unified WBA, IBF and lineal heavyweight titles in 1994. He remains one of only two southpaws to win the lineal world championship at heavyweight, being joined by Oleksandr Usyk, and the only light heavyweight world champion to win a heavyweight world title on more than one occasion.

Moorer is only one of four boxers over the last century that has ever won a version of a world title at both light heavyweight and heavyweight along with Roy Jones Jr., Michael Spinks, and James Toney.

Since retiring from the sport, Moorer has worked as a boxing trainer and private investigator. In 2009, he worked alongside Freddie Roach at the Wild Card gym in Los Angeles.

Moorer was inducted into the International Boxing Hall of Fame as part of the class of 2024.

== Amateur career ==
Moorer was born in Brooklyn and raised in the small town of Monessen, Pennsylvania. From an early age, Moorer began playing football and was raised by a single mother, who noticed Moorer's unusual hyperactivity. At age 10, Moorer's grandfather, a former New York Golden Gloves Champion who sparred with greats such as Archie Moore, encouraged Moorer to begin training at age 11. Moorer is naturally right-handed, but fought the entirety of his career as a southpaw. Moorer graduated from Monessen High School in 1987, where he starred in football as a linebacker and tight end.

As his amateur career developed, Moorer moved to Detroit, Michigan to train with the legendary Emanuel Steward. In 1986, Moorer was a National Champion for the 156 lb (light middleweight) weight class. At Steward's Kronk Gym, Moorer was known for beating professionals while still an amateur. Moorer also won a bronze medal at the Goodwill Games, and finished his amateur career with a record of 48–16.

== Professional career ==
=== Light heavyweight ===
Moorer had a fast rise through the professional boxing ranks. He debuted on March 4, 1988, knocking out Adrian Riggs in the first round. Before the year's end, he was undefeated in eleven bouts (winning all by way of early round knockouts) and fighting for the world title for the first time. He acquired the newly created WBO light heavyweight title with a five-round knockout of Ramzi Hassan.

In 1989, he retained the title six times, beating Freddie Delgado, Frankie Swindell, Mike Sedillo and former WBA champion Leslie Stewart, among others.

In 1990, he retained the title three times before the end of the year, beating Mario Melo and former Michael Spinks challenger Jim McDonald, among others.

=== Heavyweight ===
1991 saw Moorer move up to the heavyweight division. He rolled through the competition en route to securing an opportunity to fight for the vacant WBO heavyweight championship the following year against Bert Cooper. Moorer stopped Cooper in the fifth round after both fighters were down and hurt during the bout.

He did not defend the then-lesser regarded WBO heavyweight belt. Moorer and trainer Emanuel Steward parted ways after the Cooper fight. Moorer eventually joined Lou Duva's team, and was trained by Georgie Benton for three fights in 1993, including a 10-round decision win over former champion James "Bonecrusher" Smith.

Moorer then parted ways with the Duvas and Benton, and hired New York-based trainer Teddy Atlas in late 1993. Moorer closed the year with a ten-round decision over Mike Evans.

=== Unified heavyweight champion ===
On April 22, 1994, Moorer challenged Evander Holyfield for the lineal, IBF, and WBA title belts. In round 2 Holyfield sent Moorer down on the canvas, but Moorer overcame and went on to win a majority decision. As a result, he became the first-ever southpaw heavyweight champion.

In his first defense of those belts, on November 5, 1994, Moorer faced 45-year-old George Foreman, who lost his last fight for the vacant WBO heavyweight title to Tommy Morrison. For nine rounds, Moorer easily outboxed him, hitting and moving away, while Foreman moving forward, seemingly unable to "pull the trigger" on his punches. Moorer was ahead on all three judges' scorecards entering the 10th round, when Foreman hit him with a number of long-range jabs. Then, suddenly, a short right hand caught Moorer square on his chin, gashing open his bottom lip, and he collapsed to the canvas. Moorer was knocked out and lost the world championship. He also lost his undefeated record. Foreman, at age 45, became the oldest fighter ever to win the world heavyweight title.

The following year, Moorer re-grouped by winning against fringe contender Melvin Foster. Meanwhile, Foreman retained the title with a close and controversial decision against German fighter Axel Schulz.

Because of the controversial nature of the Foreman-Schulz bout, the IBF ordered Foreman to travel to Germany for a rematch, but Foreman refused, choosing to leave the IBF belt vacant instead. South African Francois Botha travelled to Germany instead and beat Schulz with another close decision to claim the title, but he was stripped of it when he tested positive for illegal substances shortly after.

=== Third heavyweight title reign ===
Moorer was then given the opportunity to fight Schulz for the vacant crown in Dortmund. On June 22, 1996, Moorer won the IBF heavyweight crown once again, beating Schulz by a 12-round split decision.

He became a three-time heavyweight champion; WBO (1992), WBA/IBF (1994) and IBF (1996–1997). When Moorer held the WBO heavyweight title, it wasn't considered an authentic heavyweight title. Ironically, Moorer has always been recognized as a former light heavyweight champion despite only ever holding the WBO title at that weight.

Moorer's first defense came against Botha on November 9, 1996. In a brutal one-sided bout, Moorer, leading on the cards going into the 12th, ended with a flourish, knocking Botha out 18 seconds into the final round.

In March 1997, Moorer retained his belt with a 12-round decision over previously undefeated Vaughn Bean before parting ways with trainer Teddy Atlas, with whom he'd been experiencing increasing tension since the beginning of their professional relationship. He replaced him with Freddie Roach.

==== Holyfield vs. Moorer II ====
On November 8, Moorer lost his IBF title in a unification match with WBA champion Evander Holyfield. Moorer was knocked down five times before ringside doctor Flip Homansky advised referee Mitch Halpern to stop the bout in round eight.

=== Comeback ===
After this, he retired from boxing for three years before returning with a knockout of journeyman Lorenzo Boyd. Moorer had begun drinking heavily and weighed 270 pounds. During his comeback, he won three more fights, then seemingly retired again when he was knocked out only 30 seconds into round one by David Tua on August 17, 2002. However, he returned to the ring once again on March 29, 2003, beating Otis Tisdale on points over ten rounds. On August 23, 2003, he beat Brazil's Rodolfo Lobo by knockout in only 64 seconds.

After a layoff of almost a year, he returned on July 3, 2004, losing a ten-round unanimous decision to Eliseo Castillo in Miami, Florida. In December of that year, Moorer rallied from a severe deficit on the scorecards to hand former cruiserweight champion Vassiliy Jirov his first knockout loss. He continued fighting, winning all of his bouts against limited opposition. His last fight was a KO win over Shelby Gross in 2008. Following the fight, Moorer retired from professional boxing.

== Personal life ==
Moorer was arrested in 1989 for taking part in a brawl in Charleroi, Pennsylvania.

In 1991, just days after his win over Alex Stewart, Moorer was arrested for assaulting a police officer. Moorer had reportedly been intoxicated at the time of his arrest. The officer he punched suffered a broken jaw. Moorer later was placed on probation and settled the case out of court.

== Professional boxing record ==
57 fights	52 wins	4 losses
By knockout	40	3
By decision	12	1
Draws	1	

No.	Result	Record	Opponent	Type	Round, time	Date	Location	Notes
57	Win	52–4–1	Shelby Gross	KO	1 (10), 0:32	Feb 8, 2008	Sheikh Rashid Hall, Dubai, UAE	
56	Win	51–4–1	Roderick Willis	SD	10	Oct 31, 2007	José Miguel Agrelot Coliseum, San Juan, Puerto Rico	
55	Win	50–4–1	Rich Boruff	TKO	1 (8), 1:34	Aug 16, 2007	Figali Convention Center, Panama City, Panama	
54	Win	49–4–1	Sedreck Fields	UD	10	Mar 16, 2007	Hard Rock Live, Hollywood, Florida, U.S.	
53	Win	48–4–1	Cliff Couser	KO	1 (10), 1:36	Dec 9, 2006	Hard Rock Live, Hollywood, Florida, U.S.	
52	Win	47–4–1	Vassiliy Jirov	TKO	9 (12), 2:08	Dec 9, 2004	Pechanga Resort & Casino, Temecula, California, U.S.	Won vacant WBA–NABA and WBC Continental Americas heavyweight titles
51	Loss	46–4–1	Eliseo Castillo	UD	10	Jul 3, 2004	American Airlines Arena, Miami, Florida, U.S.	
50	Win	46–3–1	Jose Arimatea da Silva	TKO	7 (10)	Jan 17, 2004	Seminole Casino, Coconut Creek, Florida, U.S.	
49	Win	45–3–1	Rogério Lobo	KO	1 (10), 1:04	Aug 23, 2003	Seminole Casino, Coconut Creek, Florida, U.S.	
48	Win	44–3–1	Otis Tisdale	UD	10	Mar 29, 2003	Seminole Casino, Coconut Creek, Florida, U.S.	
47	Loss	43–3–1	David Tua	KO	1 (10), 0:30	Aug 17, 2002	Etess Arena, Atlantic City, New Jersey, U.S.	
46	Win	43–2–1	Robert Davis	UD	10	Feb 16, 2002	Mohegan Sun Arena, Montville, Connecticut, U.S.	
45	Win	42–2–1	Terry Porter	TKO	4 (10), 1:11	Dec 9, 2001	Great Plains Coliseum, Lawton, Oklahoma, U.S.	
44	Draw	41–2–1	Dale Crowe	TD	5 (10), 0:35	Jul 27, 2001	Soaring Eagle Casino, Mount Pleasant, Michigan, U.S.	TD after Crowe cut from accidental head clash
43	Win	41–2	Terrence Lewis	TKO	2 (10), 2:42	Jan 12, 2001	Lucky Star Casino, Concho, Oklahoma, U.S.	
42	Win	40–2	Lorenzo Boyd	TKO	4 (9), 1:22	Nov 17, 2000	Memorial Auditorium, Burlington, Iowa, U.S.	
41	Loss	39–2	Evander Holyfield	RTD	8 (12), 3:00	Nov 8, 1997	Thomas & Mack Center, Paradise, Nevada, U.S.	Lost IBF heavyweight title; For WBA heavyweight title
40	Win	39–1	Vaughn Bean	MD	12	Mar 29, 1997	Las Vegas Hilton, Winchester, Nevada, U.S.	Retained IBF heavyweight title
39	Win	38–1	Francois Botha	TKO	12 (12), 0:18	Nov 9, 1996	MGM Grand Garden Arena, Paradise, Nevada, U.S.	Retained IBF heavyweight title
38	Win	37–1	Axel Schulz	SD	12	Jun 22, 1996	Westfalenstadion, Dortmund, Germany	Won vacant IBF heavyweight title
37	Win	36–1	Melvin Foster	UD	10	May 13, 1995	ARCO Arena, Sacramento, California, U.S.	
36	Loss	35–1	George Foreman	KO	10 (12), 2:03	Nov 5, 1994	MGM Grand Garden Arena, Paradise, Nevada, U.S.	Lost WBA and IBF heavyweight titles
35	Win	35–0	Evander Holyfield	MD	12	Apr 22, 1994	Caesars Palace, Paradise, Nevada, U.S.	Won WBA and IBF heavyweight titles
34	Win	34–0	Mike Evans	UD	10	Dec 4, 1993	Convention Center, Reno, Nevada, U.S.	
33	Win	33–0	James Pritchard	TKO	3 (10), 2:46	Jun 22, 1993	Etess Arena, Atlantic City, New Jersey, U.S.	
32	Win	32–0	Frankie Swindell	TKO	3 (10), 1:42	Apr 27, 1993	The Palace, Auburn Hills, Michigan, U.S.	
31	Win	31–0	James Smith	UD	10	Feb 27, 1993	Showboat, Atlantic City, New Jersey, U.S.	
30	Win	30–0	Billy Wright	TKO	2 (10), 1:26	Nov 13, 1992	Thomas & Mack Center, Paradise, Nevada, U.S.	
29	Win	29–0	Bert Cooper	TKO	5 (12), 2:21	May 15, 1992	Etess Arena, Atlantic City, New Jersey, U.S.	Won vacant WBO heavyweight title
28	Win	28–0	Everett Martin	UD	10	Mar 17, 1992	The Palace, Auburn Hills, Michigan, U.S.	
27	Win	27–0	Mike White	UD	10	Feb 1, 1992	Caesars Palace, Paradise, Nevada, U.S.	
26	Win	26–0	Bobby Crabtree	RTD	1 (10), 3:00	Nov 23, 1991	Omni Coliseum, Atlanta, Georgia, U.S.	
25	Win	25–0	Alex Stewart	TKO	4 (10), 1:54	Jul 27, 1991	The Scope, Norfolk, Virginia, U.S.	
24	Win	24–0	Levi Billups	TKO	3 (10), 2:49	Jun 25, 1991	The Palace, Auburn Hills, Michigan, U.S.	
23	Win	23–0	Terry Davis	TKO	2 (10), 1:52	Apr 19, 1991	Convention Hall, Atlantic City, New Jersey, U.S.	
22	Win	22–0	Danny Stonewalker	TKO	8 (12), 0:11	Dec 15, 1990	Civic Arena, Pittsburgh, Pennsylvania, U.S.	Retained WBO light heavyweight title
21	Win	21–0	Jim MacDonald	TKO	3 (10), 0:55	Aug 21, 1990	The Palace, Auburn Hills, Michigan, U.S.	
20	Win	20–0	Mario Oscar Melo	KO	1 (12), 1:52	Apr 28, 1990	Etess Arena, Atlantic City, New Jersey, U.S.	Retained WBO light heavyweight title
19	Win	19–0	Marcellus Allen	RTD	9 (12), 3:00	Feb 3, 1990	Convention Hall, Atlantic City, New Jersey, U.S.	Retained WBO light heavyweight title
18	Win	18–0	Mike Sedillo	TKO	6 (12), 2:07	Dec 12, 1989	The Palace, Auburn Hills, Michigan, U.S.	Retained WBO light heavyweight title
17	Win	17–0	Jeff Thompson	KO	1 (12), 1:46	Nov 16, 1989	Steel Pier, Atlantic City, New Jersey, U.S.	Retained WBO light heavyweight title
16	Win	16–0	Leslie Stewart	TKO	8 (12), 2:05	Jun 25, 1989	Convention Hall, Atlantic City, New Jersey, U.S.	Retained WBO light heavyweight title
15	Win	15–0	Freddie Delgado	TKO	1 (12), 2:39	Apr 22, 1989	The Palace, Auburn Hills, Michigan, U.S.	Retained WBO light heavyweight title
14	Win	14–0	Frankie Swindell	TKO	6 (12), 2:50	Feb 19, 1989	High School Gym, Monessen, Pennsylvania, U.S.	Retained WBO light heavyweight title
13	Win	13–0	Victor Claudio	TKO	2 (12)	Jan 14, 1989	The Palace, Auburn Hills, Michigan, U.S.	Retained WBO light heavyweight title
12	Win	12–0	Ramzi Hassan	TKO	5 (12), 2:37	Dec 3, 1988	Brook Park, Ohio, U.S.	Won inaugural WBO light heavyweight title
11	Win	11–0	Glenn Kennedy	KO	1, 0:36	Nov 4, 1988	Las Vegas Hilton, Winchester, Nevada, U.S.	
10	Win	10–0	Carl Williams	TKO	1, 1:15	Oct 17, 1988	Tucson, Arizona, U.S.	
9	Win	9–0	Jorge Suero	TKO	2	Oct 7, 1988	The Palace, Auburn Hills, Michigan, U.S.	
8	Win	8–0	Jordan Keepers	TKO	2	Aug 12, 1988	The Eagles Club, Milwaukee, Wisconsin, U.S.	
7	Win	7–0	Terrence Walker	RTD	5 (10), 0:01	Aug 6, 1988	Showboat Hotel and Casino, Las Vegas, Nevada, U.S.	
6	Win	6–0	LaVelle Stanley	TKO	2	Jun 25, 1988	Cobo Arena, Detroit, Michigan, U.S.	
5	Win	5–0	Keith McMurray	TKO	2 (4)	Jun 6, 1988	Las Vegas Hilton, Winchester, Nevada, U.S.	
4	Win	4–0	Dennis Fikes	TKO	2	May 10, 1988	Phoenix, Arizona, U.S.	
3	Win	3–0	Brett Zwierzynski	KO	1 (6)	Apr 29, 1988	Detroit, Michigan, U.S.	
2	Win	2–0	Bill Lee	TKO	1	Mar 25, 1988	Cobo Arena, Detroit, Michigan, U.S.	
1	Win	1–0	Adrian Riggs	TKO	1 (4), 2:26	Mar 4, 1988	Las Vegas, Nevada, U.S.	

== Titles in boxing ==
Major World titles

- WBA heavyweight champion (200+ lbs)
- WBO heavyweight champion (200+ lbs)
- IBF heavyweight champion (200+ lbs) (2x)
- WBO light heavyweight champion (200+ lbs)

Regional/International titles

- NABA heavyweight champion (200+ lbs)
- WBC Continental Americas heavyweight champion (200+ lbs)

== See also ==
- List of WBA world champions
- List of IBF world champions
- List of WBO world champions
- List of light heavyweight boxing champions
- List of heavyweight boxing champions

Sporting positions
Amateur boxing titles
Previous: Tim Littles	U.S. light middleweight champion 1986	Next: Joe Bir
Regional boxing titles
Vacant Title last held by Lance Whitaker	WBA–NABA heavyweight champion December 9, 2004 – March 2005; Vacated	Vacant Title next held by Taurus Sykes
Vacant Title last held by James Toney	WBC Continental Americas heavyweight champion December 9, 2004 – April 2005; Vacated	Vacant Title next held by DaVarryl Williamson
World boxing titles
Inaugural champion	WBO light heavyweight champion December 3, 1988 – April 1991; Vacated	Vacant Title next held by Leeonzer Barber
Vacant Title last held by Ray Mercer	WBO heavyweight champion May 15, 1992 – February 2, 1993; Vacated	Vacant Title next held by Tommy Morrison
Preceded by Evander Holyfield	WBA heavyweight champion April 22, 1994 – November 5, 1994	Succeeded by George Foreman
Preceded by Evander Holyfield	IBF heavyweight champion April 22, 1994 – November 5, 1994	Succeeded by George Foreman
Vacant Title last held by George Foreman vacated	IBF heavyweight champion June 22, 1996 – November 8, 1997	Succeeded by Evander Holyfield
