= Francois Botha =

South African boxer

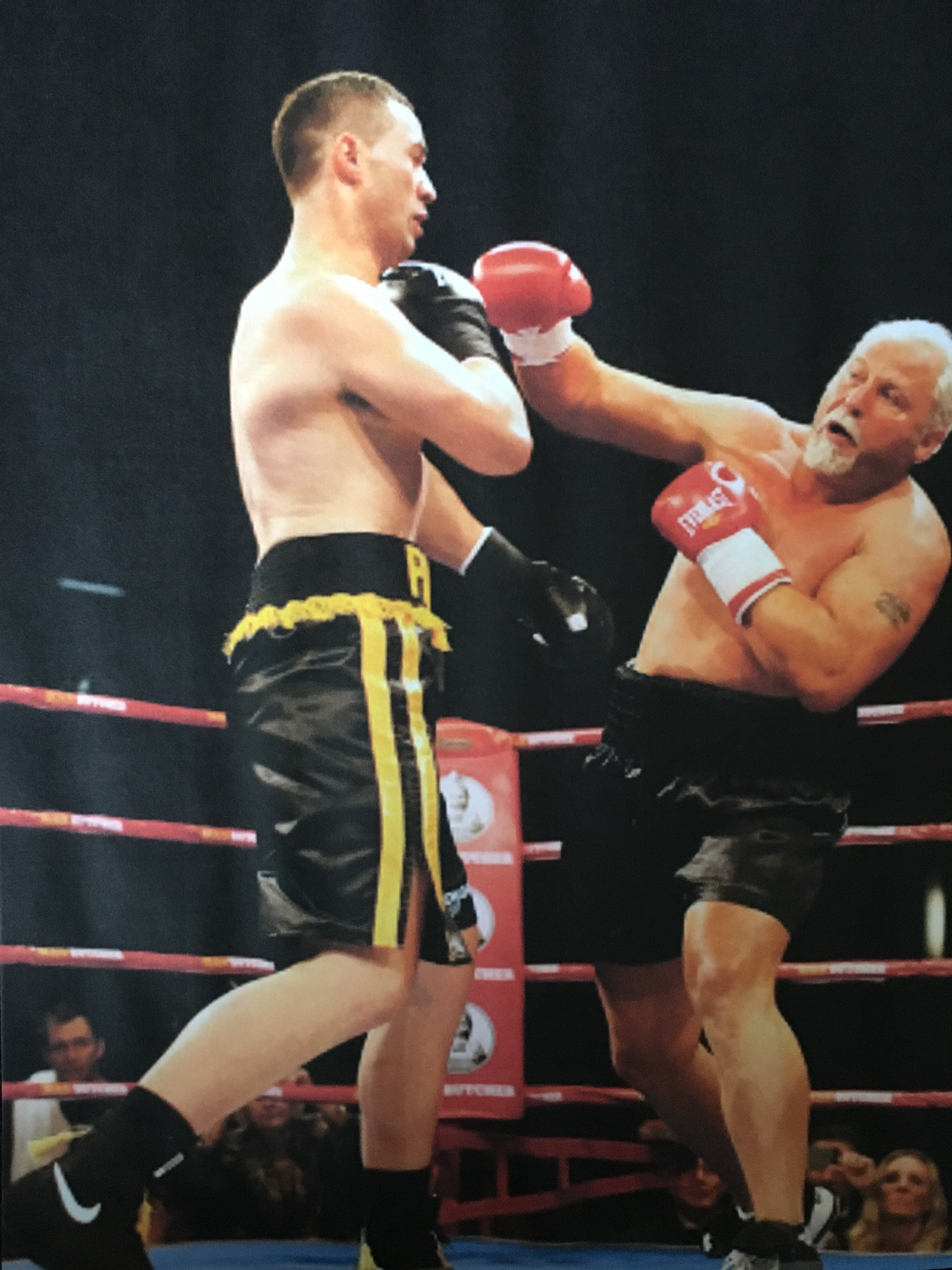
- Botha (right) vs. Parker, 2013
- Born: Francois Johannes Botha; 28 September 1968 (age 58); Witbank, South Africa
- Nickname: The White Buffalo
- Height: 1.88 m (6 ft 2 in)
- Division: Heavyweight (boxing/kickboxing/MMA); Cruiserweight (boxing)
- Reach: 188 cm (74 in)
- Style: Boxing
- Stance: Orthodox
- Team: Vallentuna Boxing Camp
- Trainer: Mats Söderström; Po Lindwall
- Years active: 1990–2014 (boxing); 2003–2015 (kickboxing); 2004 (MMA)

Professional boxing record
- Total: 63
- Wins: 48
- By knockout: 29
- Losses: 11
- By knockout: 9
- Draws: 3
- No contests: 1

Kickboxing record
- Total: 17
- Wins: 4
- By knockout: 3
- Losses: 13
- By knockout: 1

Mixed martial arts record
- Total: 1
- Wins: 0
- Losses: 1
- By submission: 1

Other information
- Boxing record from BoxRec
- Mixed martial arts record from Sherdog

Francois "Frans" Botha (born 28 September 1968) is a South African former professional boxer and kickboxer. He competed in boxing from 1990 to 2014, and is perhaps best known for winning the IBF heavyweight title against Axel Schulz in 1995, but this was later stripped after he failed a drug test. He challenged twice for world heavyweight titles in 2000 and 2002. Botha has competed against former Heavyweight Champions Mike Tyson, Lennox Lewis, Michael Moorer and Evander Holyfield late in their respective careers. Botha competed once in mixed martial arts in 2004.

== Boxing career ==
=== Early career ===
Botha had a victory in 1995 against Germany's Axel Schulz to win the IBF heavyweight Championship, but later tested positive for the steroid nandrolone he and his camp claimed to be prescribed by a doctor for an arm injury. The result of the fight was then changed to a "no contest", and the IBF do not recognize Botha as former champion.

In 1996, "The White Buffalo" bounced back with a courageous effort with Michael Moorer for the IBF crown on the undercard of Mike Tyson's first contest with Evander Holyfield. Botha suffered a TKO in the twelfth round. This led to a fight with Mike Tyson on 16 January 1999, followed by Shannon Briggs, and heavyweight title showdowns with Lennox Lewis and Wladimir Klitschko. Botha came up on the short end via knockout in both of those encounters for the heavyweight title.

Four months after the Klitschko fight, Botha fought contender Clifford Etienne, and knocked him down twice, but was denied a victory and received a majority draw with two judges scoring it 94–94 and one judge scoring it 95–93 in favor of Botha. This was in Etienne's hometown.

=== Comeback ===
In July 2007, Botha returned to boxing with a unanimous decision victory over Bob Mirovic in a fight held in South Africa. Botha dominated the fight, with two judges ruling that won all twelve rounds, and one judge ruling that he won ten of twelve. The bout was for the interim WBF World Heavyweight title.

On 6 February 2009, Botha beat Ron "Rocky" Guerrero by unanimous decision for the vacant WBF heavyweight title in South Africa. He successfully defended his WBF title against Timo Hoffmann on 15 May 2009 in Germany, winning the fight by split decision.

Botha was scheduled to box Joey Abell on 27 March 2010 (postponed from the earlier date of 16 January 2010) at the Uganda Nelson Mandela Memorial Stadium in Kampala, Uganda. On 10 January, the World Boxing Foundation executive has decided to vacate the WBF World Heavyweight Title due to Botha not defending within the agreed time limit.

On 10 April 2010 Botha lost via knockout in the 8th round to Evander Holyfield at the Thomas and Mack Center in Las Vegas, Nevada. Holyfield won the WBF heavyweight title for his victory.

Since then, Botha has won against former undefeated South African prospect Flo Simba. He then fought Michael Grant for the vacant WBF heavyweight title and was leading on the scorecards when he was knocked out with a long right hand from Grant with seconds remaining in the contest. Two fights later, Botha fought Francesco Pianeta, who was undefeated in 29 fights, losing the 10 round bout on points.

He was due to fight New Zealand dual-international Sonny Bill Williams in Brisbane on 24 November 2012. However, the fight was cancelled and moved to February. Finally, the Williams fight did take place in Brisbane. However, only 10 out of a publicised 12 rounds were fought. Bout judges awarded the fight to the New Zealand Champion on points. Since that night in Brisbane there has been a lot of talk in the media, ranging from a failed drugs test, to no drugs testing at all, no WBA official present at the bout, and one fight judge stated that the first he heard about the fight being 10 rounds was from the arena announcer. However, despite all the media speculation, the WBA has confirmed that the fight was legitimate and Williams was the recognised International heavyweight title-holder.

== Kickboxing and mixed martial arts career ==
From 2003 to 2006 Botha participated several times in the kickboxing combat sport, K-1. His current K-1 record is 4–11, with two wins coming against K-1/Kickboxing legends Jérôme Le Banner and Peter Aerts. Botha's final K-1 match was a three-round decision loss to Jorgen Kruth on 20 May 2006 in a K-1 superfight in Stockholm, Sweden.

Botha also had one mixed martial arts fight. On 31 December 2004 he lost to Yoshihiro Akiyama via an armbar submission in the first round.

On 14 October, Botha beat Espedito Da Silva by KO at K-1 Rules Africa Bomba-Yaa 2006.

Botha made a return to kickboxing in 2008. On 30 March 2008, he defeated muay thai kickboxer Kaoklai Kaennorsing at The KHAN in Seoul, Korea by decision. He lost to French kickboxer "Le Gentleman" Gregory Tony at WFC 6 on 27 September 2008 in Bulgaria.

== Professional boxing record ==
63 fights	48 wins	11 losses
By knockout	29	9
By decision	19	2
Draws	3	
No contests	1	

No.	Result	Record	Opponent	Type	Round, time	Date	Location	Notes
63	Loss	48–11–3 (1)	Andrzej Wawrzyk	TKO	5 (10), 1:56	15 Mar 2014	Hotel Arłamów, Arłamów, Poland	For vacant Poland International heavyweight title
62	Loss	48–10–3 (1)	Joseph Parker	TKO	2 (8), 2:32	13 Jun 2013	The Trusts Arena, Auckland, New Zealand	
61	Loss	48–9–3 (1)	Sonny Bill Williams	UD	10	8 Feb 2013	Entertainment Centre, Brisbane, Australia	For vacant WBA International heavyweight title
60	Loss	48–8–3 (1)	Francesco Pianeta	UD	10	7 Sep 2012	RWE Rhein-Ruhr Sporthalle, Mülheim, Germany	
59	Loss	48–7–3 (1)	Carlos Takam	TKO	11 (12)	31 Mar 2012	Gymnase Jean Richepin, Noisy-le-Grand, France	For WBO Africa and vacant WBF (Federation) International heavyweight titles
58	Loss	48–6–3 (1)	Michael Grant	KO	12 (12), 2:23	19 Nov 2011	Montecasino, Johannesburg, South Africa	For WBF (Federation) heavyweight title
57	Win	48–5–3 (1)	Flo Simba	TKO	6 (10), 2:50	4 Jun 2011	Emperor's Palace, Kempton Park, South Africa	
56	Loss	47–5–3 (1)	Evander Holyfield	TKO	8 (12), 0:55	10 Apr 2010	Thomas & Mack Center, Paradise, Nevada, US	For vacant WBF (Federation) heavyweight title
55	Draw	47–4–3 (1)	Pedro Carrión	MD	12	24 Oct 2009	Anhalt Arena, Dessau, Germany	For vacant WBF (Federation) heavyweight title
54	Win	47–4–2 (1)	Timo Hoffmann	SD	12	15 May 2009	Bördelandhalle, Magdeburg, Germany	Retained WBF (Foundation) heavyweight title
53	Win	46–4–2 (1)	Ron Guerrero	UD	12	6 Feb 2009	Tlokwe Banquet Hall, Potchefstroom, South Africa	Won vacant WBF (Foundation) heavyweight title
52	Win	45–4–2 (1)	Bob Mirovic	UD	12	6 Jul 2007	Carousel Casino, Hammanskraal, South Africa	Won vacant WBF (Foundation) interim heavyweight title
51	Draw	44–4–2 (1)	Clifford Etienne	MD	10	27 Jul 2002	New Orleans Arena, New Orleans, Louisiana, US	
50	Loss	44–4–1 (1)	Wladimir Klitschko	TKO	8 (12), 0:47	16 Mar 2002	Hanns-Martin-Schleyer-Halle, Stuttgart, Germany	For WBO heavyweight title
49	Win	44–3–1 (1)	Russell Chasteen	TKO	3 (10), 1:36	13 Jul 2001	Agua Caliente Casino Resort Spa, Rancho Mirage, California, US	
48	Win	43–3–1 (1)	David Bostice	UD	10	5 Jun 2001	Fremont Street Experience, Las Vegas, Nevada, US	
47	Win	42–3–1 (1)	Joey Guy	KO	1 (10), 2:40	16 Mar 2001	The Orleans, Paradise, Nevada, US	
46	Win	41–3–1 (1)	Tony LaRosa	TKO	1 (10), 2:56	2 Nov 2000	Washington, D.C., US	
45	Loss	40–3–1 (1)	Lennox Lewis	TKO	2 (12), 2:39	15 Jul 2000	London Arena, London, England	For WBC, IBF, and IBO heavyweight titles
44	Win	40–2–1 (1)	Steve Pannell	TKO	1 (10), 2:08	8 Jan 2000	University Arena, Albuquerque, New Mexico, US	
43	Draw	39–2–1 (1)	Shannon Briggs	MD	10	7 Aug 1999	Etess Arena, Atlantic City, New Jersey, US	
42	Loss	39–2 (1)	Mike Tyson	KO	5 (10), 2:59	16 Jan 1999	MGM Grand Garden Arena, Las Vegas, Nevada, US	
41	Win	39–1 (1)	David Cherry	TKO	1 (10), 2:38	26 Jun 1998	Boone County Fairgrounds, Kansas City, Missouri, US	
40	Win	38–1 (1)	Stan Johnson	KO	1 (10), 0:27	24 Apr 1998	County Fairgrounds, Dubuque, Iowa, US	
39	Win	37–1 (1)	Lee Gilbert	UD	12	21 Jun 1997	USF Sun Dome, Tampa, Florida, US	Retained WBA–NABA heavyweight title
38	Win	36–1 (1)	James Stanton	KO	10 (12), 3:00	10 May 1997	Convention Center, Coconut Grove, Florida, US	Won vacant WBA–NABA heavyweight title
37	Loss	35–1 (1)	Michael Moorer	TKO	12 (12), 1:18	9 Nov 1996	MGM Grand Garden Arena, Las Vegas, Nevada, US	For IBF heavyweight title
36	NC	35–0 (1)	Axel Schulz	SD	12	9 Dec 1995	Hanns-Martin-Schleyer-Halle, Stuttgart, Germany	Vacant IBF heavyweight title at stake; Originally SD win for Botha, later ruled NC after he failed a drug test
35	Win	35–0	Willie Jake	UD	8	8 Apr 1995	Caesars Palace, Paradise, Nevada, US	
34	Win	34–0	Brian Sargent	TKO	1 (10)	17 Mar 1995	Memorial Auditorium, Worcester, Massachusetts, US	
33	Win	33–0	Bill Corrigan	TKO	1 (10), 0:41	7 Mar 1995	War Memorial Auditorium, Fort Lauderdale, Florida, US	
32	Win	32–0	Ken Lakusta	KO	1 (10)	17 Dec 1994	Coliseo General Rumiñahui, Quito, Ecuador	
31	Win	31–0	Phil Scott	RTD	6 (10), 3:00	2 Jul 1994	The Mirage, Paradise, Nevada, US	
30	Win	30–0	Martin Foster	TKO	1 (10), 1:37	21 May 1994	Kings Hall, Belfast, Northern Ireland	
29	Win	29–0	Craig Payne	RTD	7 (10)	30 Oct 1993	Nasrec Indoor Arena, Johannesburg, South Africa	
28	Win	28–0	John Morton	TKO	3 (10)	1 Oct 1993	ARCO Arena, Sacramento, California, US	
27	Win	27–0	Ron Goodwin	KO	4 (10)	25 Jun 1993	Phoenix, Arizona, US	
26	Win	26–0	Calvin Jones	TKO	2 (10)	15 Jun 1993	Denison, Texas, US	
25	Win	25–0	Billy Wright	TKO	5 (8), 2:33	16 Jan 1993	Convention Center, Reno, Nevada, US	
24	Win	24–0	Artie Hooks	KO	1 (8)	19 Nov 1992	Days Inn South, Oklahoma City, Oklahoma, US	
23	Win	23–0	Mike Jones	KO	1 (8)	19 Nov 1992	Days Inn South, Oklahoma City, Oklahoma, US	
22	Win	22–0	Russell Rierson	KO	1 (8)	19 Nov 1992	Days Inn South, Oklahoma City, Oklahoma, US	
21	Win	21–0	Jimmy Bills	UD	8	7 Oct 1992	Amarillo, Texas, US	
20	Win	20–0	Russell Rierson	KO	5 (8)	29 Sep 1992	Oklahoma City, Oklahoma, US	
19	Win	19–0	Mike Hunter	MD	8	22 Sep 1992	County Coliseum, El Paso, Texas, US	
18	Win	18–0	David Martin	KO	3 (8)	18 Jul 1992	Civic Assembly Center, Muskogee, Oklahoma, US	
17	Win	17–0	Ken Jackson	UD	8	4 Jul 1992	Dallas, Texas, US	
16	Win	16–0	Ron Ackerson	KO	3 (8)	12 Jun 1992	Central Plaza Hotel, Oklahoma City, Oklahoma, US	
15	Win	15–0	Marion Wilson	PTS	8	29 May 1992	Amarillo, Texas, US	
14	Win	14–0	Ron Ackerson	KO	3 (8)	7 May 1992	Westin Hotel, Tulsa, Oklahoma, US	
13	Win	13–0	Tim Tomashek	PTS	10	15 Nov 1991	ARCO Arena, Sacramento, California, US	
12	Win	12–0	Ginger Tshabalala	SD	6	30 Sep 1991	Nasrec Indoor Arena, Johannesburg, South Africa	
11	Win	11–0	Siza Makathini	SD	10	18 Aug 1991	Nasrec Indoor Arena, Johannesburg, South Africa	Won Transvaal heavyweight title
10	Win	10–0	Shaun Ayers	UD	10	30 Jun 1991	Nasrec Indoor Arena, Johannesburg, South Africa	
9	Win	9–0	Rick Rice	KO	3 (8)	18 Feb 1991	Voortrekkerhoogte, Pretoria, South Africa	
8	Win	8–0	Gideon Hlongwa	PTS	6	27 Jan 1991	Good Hope Centre, Cape Town, South Africa	
7	Win	7–0	Leander Collins	KO	2 (8)	22 Sep 1990	International Convention Center, Brownsville, Texas, US	
6	Win	6–0	Andre Smiley	KO	2 (8)	11 Sep 1990	Central Plaza Hotel, Oklahoma City, Oklahoma, US	
5	Win	5–0	Kevin Denson	PTS	6	25 Aug 1990	Civic Center, Lewiston, Maine, US	
4	Win	4–0	Elvis Franks	UD	4	23 Jun 1990	Dallas, Texas, US	
3	Win	3–0	Joe Adams	UD	4	27 Apr 1990	Point Cadet Plaza, Biloxi, Mississippi, US	
2	Win	2–0	Themba Msweli	PTS	4	9 Apr 1990	University Arena, Pretoria, South Africa	
1	Win	1–0	Johan Van Zyl	KO	1 (4)	11 Feb 1990	Portuguese Hall, Johannesburg, South Africa	

== Kickboxing record ==
4 wins, 12 losses
Date	Result	Opponent	Event	Method	Round	Time
21 November 2015	Loss	(China) Asihati	Kunlun Fight 34, Shenzhen, China	Decision	3	3:00
27 September 2008	Loss	(France) Gregory Tony	WFC 6, Sofia, Bulgaria	Decision	3	3:00
30 March 2008	Win	(Thailand) Kaoklai Kaennorsing	The Khan 1, Seoul, Korea	Decision	3	3:00
14 October 2006	Win	(Brazil) Espedito Da Silva	K-1 Rules Africa Bomba-Yaa 2006	KO (strikes)	2	N/A
20 May 2006	Loss	(Sweden) Jorgen Kruth	K-1 Scandinavia GP in Stockholm	Decision	3	3:00
5/03/2006	Loss	(New Zealand) Ray Sefo	K-1 WGP 2005 in Auckland	Decision	3	3:00
23 September 2005	Loss	(Japan) Musashi	K-1 2005 WGP Final Elimination	Decision	3	3:00
13 August 2005	Loss	(United States) Mighty Mo	K-1 2005 in Las Vegas II	TKO (strikes)	1	1:20
4/12/2004	Loss	(Netherlands) Remy Bonjasky	K-1 2004 WGP Final	Decision	3	3:00
4/12/2004	Win	(Netherlands) Peter Aerts	K-1 2004 WGP Final	TKO (leg injury)	1	1:13
25 September 2004	Win	(France) Jérôme Le Banner	K-1 2004 WGP Final Elimination	Forfeit (injury)	3	N/A
6/05/2004	Loss	(Netherlands) Remy Bonjasky	K-1 WGP in Nagoya	Decision	3	3:00
27 March 2004	Loss	(Belgium) Aziz Khattou	K-1 WGP in Saitama	Decision	3	3:00
31 December 2003	Loss	(Japan) Yusuke Fujimoto	Dynamite!!	Decision	3	3:00
6/12/2003	Loss	(France) Cyril Abidi	K-1 2003 WGP Final	Decision	3	3:00
11/09/2003	Loss	(France) Cyril Abidi	K-1 2003 WGP Final Elimination	DQ	1	0:19

== Mixed martial arts record ==
Professional record breakdown
1 match	0 wins	1 loss
By submission	0	1

Res.	Record	Opponent	Method	Event	Date	Round	Time	Location	Notes
Loss	0–1	Yoshihiro Akiyama	Submission (armbar)	K-1 PREMIUM 2004 Dynamite!!	31 December 2004	1	1:54	Osaka, Japan	
