= Axel Schulz =

German boxer

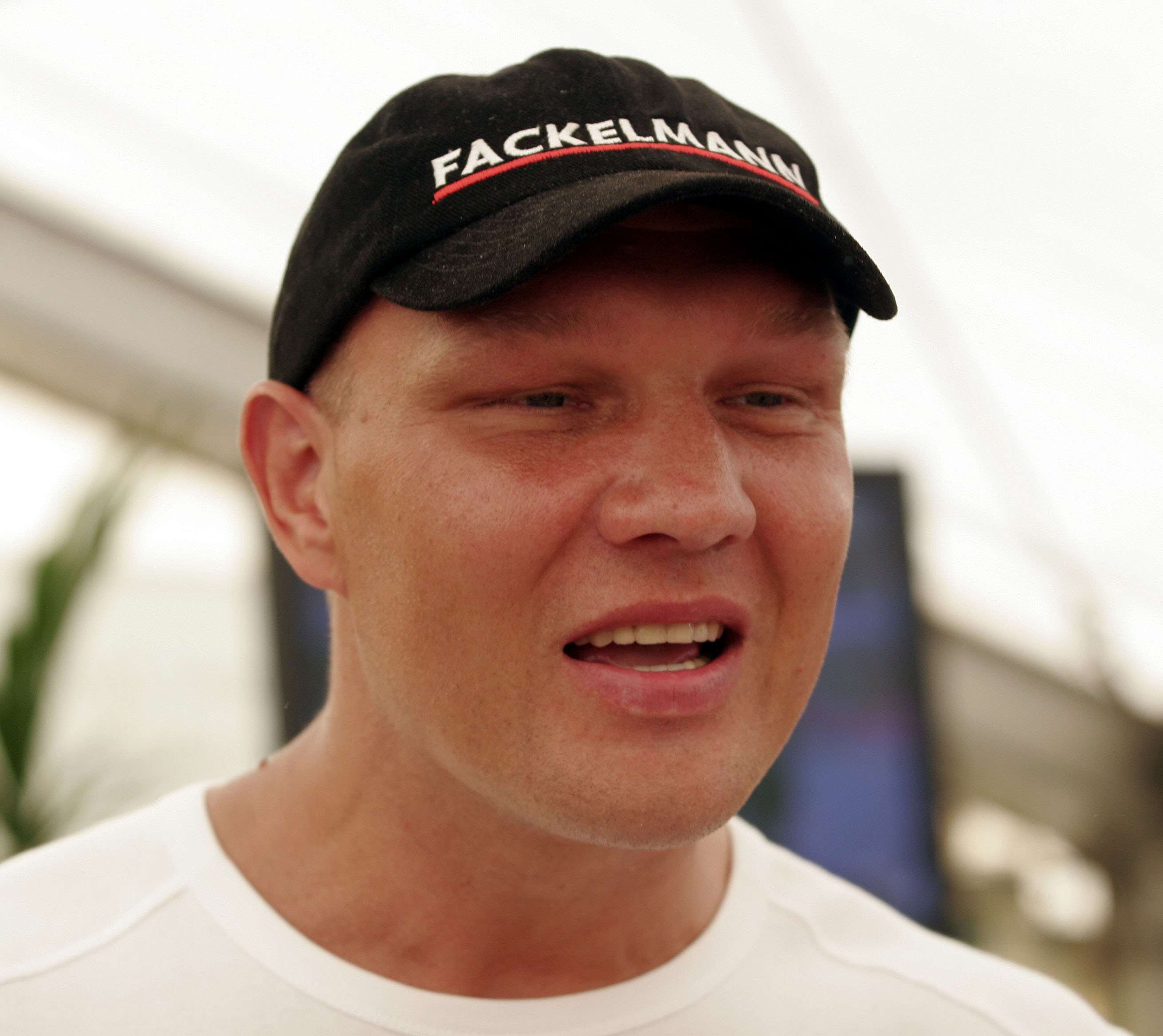
- Schulz in 2007

Personal information
- Nicknames: Der sanfte Riese ("The Gentle Giant")
- Nationality: German
- Born: 9 November 1968 (age 57) Bad Saarow, Bezirk Frankfurt, East Germany
- Height: 1.91 m (6 ft 3 in)
- Weight: Heavyweight

Boxing career
- Reach: 193 cm (76 in)
- Stance: Orthodox

Boxing record
- Total fights: 33
- Wins: 26
- Win by KO: 11
- Losses: 5
- Draws: 1
- No contests: 1
Medal record
Men's amateur boxing
Representing East Germany
World Championships
Bronze medal – third place	1989 Moscow	Heavyweight
European Championships
Silver medal – second place	1989 Athens	Heavyweight

Axel Schulz (born 9 November 1968) is a German former professional boxer who competed between 1990 and 2006. He challenged three times for the IBF heavyweight title in 1995 and 1996. At regional level, he held the German heavyweight title in 1992; and challenged three times for the European heavyweight title in 1992, 1993 and 1999. As an amateur, he won a bronze medal at the 1989 World Championships and silver at the 1989 European Championships. He holds a notable win over former world heavyweight champion James Smith.

== Amateur career ==
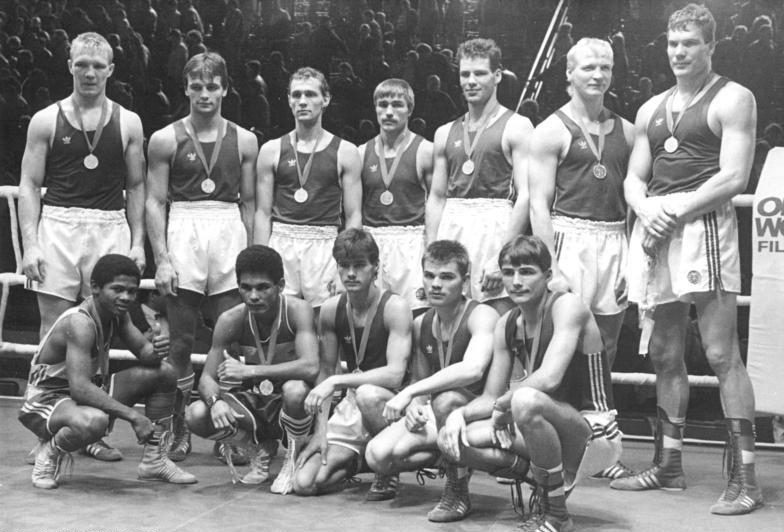
Axel Schulz and Torsten Schmitz at the awards ceremony of the 1989 Chemistry Cup

From 1982 Schulz boxed for the army sports club Vorwärts in Frankfurt (Oder), later becoming the East German youth champion. From 1986 onward, he was a Stasi informer under the codename "Markus". At the junior European championships in Denmark in 1986, Schulz won the light-heavyweight title, and in 1988, under the tutelage of Manfred Wolke, he became East German heavyweight champion. In 1989 he won the Chemiepokal in Halle (Saale), the silver medal at European Championships in Athens, and a bronze medal in the world championships in Moscow, where he lost to Félix Savón. Amateur record: 78 wins, 20 losses.

== Professional career ==
After reunification, Schulz turned professional. In 1992 he became German heavyweight champion after defeating Bernd Friedrich in Kassel.

1992 and 1993 saw two fights against Henry Akinwande for the European championship. The first fight was declared a draw, but in the return match Schulz suffered his first professional defeat.

=== IBF heavyweight title challenges ===
On 22 April 1995 Schulz fought George Foreman for the IBF heavyweight title, losing controversially on points. This was Foreman's first fight since regaining the title from Michael Moorer, and Schulz was viewed at the time as being a weak, unknown opponent. After refusing a rematch, Foreman was stripped of his title and Schulz was given a second opportunity when he fought Francois Botha for the vacant title on 12 December 1995. Following a split decision verdict in Botha's favour, the result was changed to a no-contest when Botha failed a doping test. A third chance followed for Schulz on 22 June 1996 when he faced Michael Moorer for the still vacant title. Moorer won on points.

Several fights against lower quality opposition followed. These included a stoppage victory over Kevin McBride, who eight years later would defeat a badly faded Mike Tyson. Schulz ended his career after suffering a stoppage at the hands of Wladimir Klitschko on 25 September 1999 for the vacant European championship. Schulz had been thoroughly outclassed. In the end, despite lofty expectations after the George Foreman fight, Schulz was unable to win a title at European or world level.

=== Comeback ===
Since the end of his career Schulz has worked in television as a summariser. In December 2005 he received an offer to fight again from Carl King, the stepson of the boxing promoter Don King. His comeback fight took place on November 25, 2006, against Brian Minto. He lost the fight in the sixth Round (T.K.O.).

=== Retirement ===
He retired with a record with 26-5-1 and one no contest with 11 knockouts.

== Personal life ==
Schulz married in March 2006. He and his wife had their first child, a girl, on 19 August 2006: Paulina Patricia Clara and another girl born in January 2010: Amelina Patricia Hedwig.

== Professional boxing record ==
33 fights	26 wins	5 losses
By knockout	11	2
By decision	15	3
Draws	1	
No contests	1	

No.	Result	Record	Opponent	Type	Round, time	Date	Location	Notes
33	Loss	26–5–1 (1)	Brian Minto	TKO	6 (10), 1:30	25 Nov 2006	Gerry Weber Stadion, Halle, Germany	
32	Loss	26–4–1 (1)	Wladimir Klitschko	TKO	8 (12), 2:42	25 Sep 1999	Kölnarena, Cologne, Germany	For WBA Inter-Continental and vacant European heavyweight titles
31	Win	26–3–1 (1)	Richard Mason	UD	10	22 Aug 1998	Trade Fair, Leipzig, Germany	
30	Win	25–3–1 (1)	Julius Francis	UD	12	28 Feb 1998	Westfalenhallen, Dortmund, Germany	
29	Win	24–3–1 (1)	Kevin McBride	TKO	9 (10)	30 Aug 1997	Max-Schmeling-Halle, Berlin, Germany	
28	Win	23–3–1 (1)	Jorge Valdes	UD	10	26 Apr 1997	Leipzig, Germany	
27	Win	22–3–1 (1)	Jose Ribalta	UD	10	7 Dec 1996	Vienna, Austria	
26	Loss	21–3–1 (1)	Michael Moorer	SD	12	22 Jun 1996	Westfalenstadion, Dortmund, Germany	For vacant IBF heavyweight title
25	NC	21–2–1 (1)	Francois Botha	SD	12	9 Dec 1995	Hanns-Martin-Schleyer-Halle, Stuttgart, Germany	Vacant IBF heavyweight title at stake; Originally an SD win for Botha, later ruled an NC after he failed a drug test
24	Loss	21–2–1	George Foreman	MD	12	22 Apr 1995	MGM Grand Garden Arena, Paradise, Nevada, US	For IBF and vacant WBU heavyweight titles
23	Win	21–1–1	James Smith	UD	10	17 Sep 1994	Leverkusen, Germany	
22	Win	20–1–1	Jack Basting	UD	10	18 Jun 1994	Bismarck Hotel, Chicago, Illinois, US	
21	Win	19–1–1	Troy Jefferson	PTS	8	4 Jun 1994	Westfalenhallen, Dortmund, Germany	
20	Win	18–1–1	Al Evans	TKO	3 (10)	7 May 1994	Sporthalle Oberwerth, Koblenz, Germany	
19	Win	17–1–1	Carlton West	KO	2	16 Oct 1993	Koblenz, Germany	
18	Win	16–1–1	Kimmuel Odum	UD	10	7 Aug 1993	Steel Pier, Atlantic City, New Jersey, US	
17	Loss	15–1–1	Henry Akinwande	UD	12	1 May 1993	Sporthalle Charlottenburg, Berlin, Germany	For vacant European heavyweight title
16	Draw	15–0–1	Henry Akinwande	MD	12	19 Dec 1992	Berlin, Germany	For vacant European heavyweight title
15	Win	15–0	Ricky Parkey	PTS	8	2 Oct 1992	Deutschlandhalle, Berlin, Germany	
14	Win	14–0	Bernd Friedrich	UD	10	19 Sep 1992	Kassel, Germany	Won vacant Germany BDB heavyweight title
13	Win	13–0	Laszlo Paszterko	PTS	8	25 Apr 1992	Berlin, Germany	
12	Win	12–0	Gary McCrory	TKO	2 (8)	6 Mar 1992	Berlin, Germany	
11	Win	11–0	Ricardo Spain	TKO	2 (8)	28 Jan 1992	Legien-Center, Berlin, Germany	
10	Win	10–0	Charles Dixon	KO	2	6 Dec 1991	Düsseldorf, Germany	
9	Win	9–0	David Muhammed	PTS	8	2 Oct 1991	Halle, Germany	
8	Win	8–0	Steve Gee	KO	2 (8)	13 Sep 1991	Düsseldorf, Germany	
7	Win	7–0	Laszlo Virag	TKO	3	28 Jun 1991	Dinslaken, Germany	
6	Win	6–0	Steve Garber	KO	5 (8)	31 May 1991	Berlin, Germany	
5	Win	5–0	Ramon Voorn	TKO	5, 2:39	28 Feb 1991	Philips Halle, Düsseldorf, Germany	
4	Win	4–0	Ramon Voorn	PTS	6	14 Dec 1990	Europahalle, Karlsruhe, Germany	
3	Win	3–0	Barry Ellis	PTS	6	7 Dec 1990	Berlin, Germany	
2	Win	2–0	Jens Ploesser	TKO	1	16 Nov 1990	Sporthalle Wandsbek, Hamburg, Germany	
1	Win	1–0	George Ajio	UD	6	5 Oct 1990	Philips Halle, Düsseldorf, Germany	

== Viewership ==
=== Germany ===
Date	Fight	Viewership (avg.)	Source(s)
22 April 1995	George Foreman vs. Axel Schulz	3,900,000	
9 December 1995	Axel Schulz vs. Francois Botha	18,030,000	
22 June 1996	Axel Schulz vs. Michael Moorer	11,000,000	
7 December 1996	Axel Schulz vs. Jose Ribalta	8,940,000	
28 February 1998	Axel Schulz vs. Julius Francis	8,370,000	
25 September 1999	Axel Schulz vs. Wladimir Klitschko	10,530,000	
25 November 2006	Axel Schulz vs. Brian Minto	11,530,000	
	Total viewership	74,300,000	
