= Félix Savón =

Cuban boxer

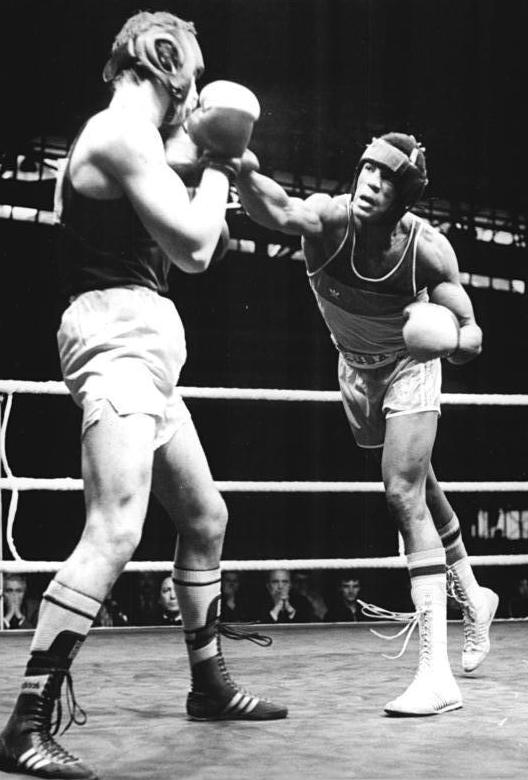
- Savón (right) in 1987

Personal information
- Nickname: Niñote ("Big Kid")
- Born: Félix Savón Fabre; 22 September 1967 (age 59) San Vicente, Cuba
- Height: 6 ft 5 in (196 cm)
- Weight: Heavyweight

Boxing career
- Reach: 82 in (208 cm)
- Stance: Orthodox

Boxing record
- Total fights: 288
- Wins: 258
- Win by KO: 158
- Losses: 10
Medal record
Men's amateur boxing
Representing Cuba
Event	1st	2nd	3rd
Olympic Games	3	0	0
World Championships	6	1	0
Jr World Championships	1	0	0
Central American Championships	5	0	0
North American Championships	1	0	0
Pan American Games	3	0	0
Central American and Caribbean Games	4	0	0
World Cup	4	0	0
Goodwill Games	2	0	0
Total	29	1	0
Olympic Games
Gold medal – first place	1992 Barcelona	Heavyweight
Gold medal – first place	1996 Atlanta	Heavyweight
Gold medal – first place	2000 Sydney	Heavyweight
World Championships
Gold medal – first place	1986 Reno	Heavyweight
Gold medal – first place	1989 Moscow	Heavyweight
Gold medal – first place	1991 Sydney	Heavyweight
Gold medal – first place	1993 Tampere	Heavyweight
Gold medal – first place	1995 Berlin	Heavyweight
Gold medal – first place	1997 Budapest	Heavyweight
Silver medal – second place	1999 Houston	Heavyweight
Junior World Championships
Gold medal – first place	1985 Bucharest	Heavyweight
Central America and the Caribbean Championships
Gold medal – first place	1984 Managua	Heavyweight
Gold medal – first place	1985 Maturín	Heavyweight
Gold medal – first place	1988 Guatemala City	Heavyweight
Gold medal – first place	1995 Mexico City	Heavyweight
Gold medal – first place	1996 Guadalajara	Heavyweight
North American Championships
Gold medal – first place	1987 Toronto	Heavyweight
Pan American Games
Gold medal – first place	1987 Indianapolis	Heavyweight
Gold medal – first place	1991 Havana	Heavyweight
Gold medal – first place	1995 Mar del Plata	Heavyweight
Central American and Caribbean Games
Gold medal – first place	1986 Santiago	Heavyweight
Gold medal – first place	1990 Mexico City	Heavyweight
Gold medal – first place	1993 Ponce	Heavyweight
Gold medal – first place	1998 Maracaibo	Heavyweight
World Cup
Gold medal – first place	1987 Belgrade	Heavyweight
Gold medal – first place	1990 Dublin	Heavyweight
Gold medal – first place	1994 Bangkok	Heavyweight
Gold medal – first place	1998 Chongqing	Heavyweight
Goodwill Games
Gold medal – first place	1994 Saint Petersburg	Heavyweight
Gold medal – first place	1998 New York	Heavyweight

Félix Savón Fabre (born 22 September 1967) is a Cuban former amateur boxer who competed from 1980 to 2000. Considered one of the all-time greatest amateurs, he became three-time Olympic gold medalist, and the World Champion six times in a row, all in the heavyweight division. In 1988, when he was favored by many to win the gold medal at the 1988 Summer Olympics, the Cuban government boycotted the event. Savón is particularly known for having rejected numerous multimillion-dollar offers to defect and leave Cuba permanently to fight Mike Tyson as a professional.

== Early life ==
He was born in San Vicente, in Guantánamo Province, Cuba. His ring debut occurred in 1980, in Guantánamo.

Savón's inspiration to become a boxer was his renowned countryman, three-time Olympic champion Teófilo Stevenson (he later was perceived by the Western media as Stevenson's successor)

== Career ==
During his career, in which he did not turn professional, he managed a career record of 362–21, with the majority of his losses avenged. The only boxers, who got away with knockout victories over Savón unavenged were Soviet Usman Arsaliyev and North Korean Li Dal-Chen, whom he met only once.

He won his first important titles in 1985. At 19 he beat America's Michael Bentt on his way to win the 1987 Pan Am games. Besides winning the Cuban heavyweight title (which he would win each year until his retirement, except 1999 and 2000 when he lost to Odlanier Solís, who he would lose to twice and defeat once in their three meetings), he also won the Junior World Championships in 1985.

This set off his career, in which he would win six World Championships; his victory at the 1997 tournament was the result of the disqualification of an opponent, future professional world champion Ruslan Chagaev (whom Savón had previously beaten), who beat Savón in the final, but was later stripped of the gold medal for having two professional fights prior to the championships. Chagaev was reinstated as an amateur the following year when these fights were declared exhibitions, but did not regain the gold medal.

"He's just a great guy and he deserves everything he's got.

— Boxer Michael Bennett on Savón.

In 1998 during the Heavyweight final of the Goodwill Games from New York, Savón had an amazing knockout over U.S. Amateur Champion DaVarryl Williamson. At the 1999 tournament, he was to fight American Michael Bennett in the final, but the whole Cuban team retired from the competition to protest the result of another Cuban boxer in the tournament whom they considered had been "robbed" by the judges, meaning that Bennett won the final on default. In their bout at the 2000 Summer Olympics Bennett would lose 23–8 to Savón.

Savón won three Olympic gold medals, a feat shared with only two other boxers, László Papp and compatriot Teófilo Stevenson. He could have been a four-time Olympic gold medalist, had the Cuban government allowed its team to participate in the 1988 Seoul, South Korea.

Savón's critics said that he is a puncher instead of a boxer who is not satisfied with a decision, risking losses by going after knockouts even when he is far ahead on points. Roosevelt Sanders, a U.S. boxing coach, said Savon would have been immediately ranked between 5th and 10th in the world's professional boxing heavyweight division if he turned pro after the 1990 Goodwill Games. "Cuba, since 1974 has been the king of amateur boxing in the world", he said. "That is why the media of other countries keep asking why we don't box professionally. Professionalism will abolish humanism and society." Savon said amateur athletes are revered in Cuba. "Athletes are the most important thing in Cuba since Castro took over. We practice sports from the age of 8."

=== Highlights ===
Local match-up (71 kg), Guantánamo, Cuba, 1980 (debut):

- Defeated (no data available) (Cuba) KO

(gold) XVI National Cadet Games (71 kg), Cuba, July 1981:

- Finals: Defeated Lino Famide (Cuba) KO

(bronze) National Youth Championships (71 kg), Cuba, 1982:

- 1/2: Lost to (no data available) (Cuba) KO

(bronze) National Friendship Games (81 kg), Cuba, 1983:

- (no data available)

(gold) National Youth Championships (81 kg), Cuba, 1983:

- (no data available)

(gold) International Youth Tournament (91 kg), Berlin, East Germany, June 1984:

- Finals: Defeated Uli Klimm (East Germany) RSC 1

(gold) XV Central America and the Caribbean Championships (91 kg), Managua, Nicaragua, 1984:

- (no data available)

(gold) XXIV Playa Girón National Championships (91 kg), Nueva Gerona, Cuba, January 1985:

- 1/2: Defeated Aurelio Toyo Pérez (Cuba) by decision
- Finals: Defeated Hermenegildo Báez (Cuba) by decision

(gold) XXXVI Strandzha Cup (91 kg), Sofia, Bulgaria, February 1985:

- Finals: Defeated Deyan Kirilov (Bulgaria) by majority decision, 4–1

(gold) XIV Chemistry Cup (91 kg), Halle, East Germany, March 1985:

- Finals: Defeated Michael Ernst (East Germany) by unanimous decision, 5–0

(gold) Trofeo Italia (91 kg), Mestre, Venice, Italy, March 1985:

- Finals: Defeated Gyula Alvics (Hungary) by unanimous decision, 5–0

(gold) XVIII Giraldo Córdova Cardín Tournament (91 kg), Ciego de Ávila, Cuba, March 1985:

- 1/2: Defeated Ramzan Sebiyev (Soviet Union)
- Finals: Defeated Hermenegildo Báez (Cuba) RSC 2

(gold) National Youth Championships (91 kg), Cuba, 1985:

- (no data available)

(gold) XVI Central America and the Caribbean Championships (91 kg), Maturín, Venezuela, September 1985:

- Finals: Defeated H. Hidalgo (Venezuela) RSC 1

(gold) III Junior World Championships (91 kg), Bucharest, Romania, September 1985:

- 1/8: Defeated Ilie Corbu (Romania) RSC 1
- 1/4: Defeated Andrey Cholakin (Soviet Union) by majority decision, 4–1
- 1/2: Defeated Attila Árvai (Hungary) by walkover
- Finals: Defeated Andrzej Golota (Poland) RET 2

(gold) XXV Playa Girón National Championships (91 kg), Havana, Cuba, January 1986:

- Finals: Defeated Roberto Balado (Cuba) KO 2

(gold) XXXVII Strandzha Cup (91 kg), Sofia, Bulgaria, February 1986:

- Finals: Defeated Rudolf Gavenčiak (Czechoslovakia) RSC 3

(gold) XVII Chemistry Cup (91 kg), Halle, East Germany, March 1986:

- Finals: Defeated Sven Lange (East Germany) RET 3

(gold) Ústí Grand Prix (91 kg), Ústí nad Labem, Czechoslovakia, March 1986:

- Finals: Defeated Anatoliy Savkin (Soviet Union) by unanimous decision, 5–0

(gold) XIX Giraldo Córdova Cardín Tournament (91 kg), Camagüey, Cuba, May 1986:

- Finals: Defeated Renat Trishev (Soviet Union) by majority decision, 4–1

(gold) IV World Championships (91 kg), Reno, Nevada, May 1986:

- 1/8: Defeated Gyula Alvics (Hungary) by unanimous decision, 5–0
- 1/4: Defeated Luis Castillo (Ecuador) KO 2 (the bout stopped for Castillo hitting below the belt; later ruled a knockout)
- 1/2: Defeated Svilen Rusinov (Bulgaria) RSC 2
- Finals: Defeated Arnold Vanderlyde (Netherlands) by unanimous decision, 5–0

(gold) XV Central American and Caribbean Games (91 kg), Santiago, Dominican Republic, June–July 1986:

- 1/4: Defeated Emilio Payne (Costa Rica) KO 1
- 1/2: Defeated José Acosta (Venezuela) KO 1
- Finals: Defeated Rodolfo Marín (Puerto Rico) RSCH 1

National Team Championships (91 kg), Cuba, October 1986:

- Lost to Juan Delis Causse (Cuba) KO

USA–Cuba Duals (91 kg), New Orleans, Louisiana, December 1986:

- Defeated Orbit Pough (United States) by unanimous decision, 5–0

USA–Cuba Duals (91 kg), Sacramento, California, December 1986:

- Defeated Huland Copeland (United States) RSC 1

(gold) XXVI Playa Girón National Championships (91 kg), Holguín, Cuba, January 1987:

- Finals: Defeated Roberto Balado (Cuba) by decision

(gold) XVIII Chemistry Cup (91 kg), Halle, East Germany, March 1987:

- Finals: Defeated Sven Lange (East Germany) RSC 2

(bronze) Ústí Grand Prix (91 kg), Ústí nad Labem, Czechoslovakia, March 1987:

- 1/2: Lost to Usman Arsaliyev (Soviet Union) KO 3

(gold) XX Giraldo Córdova Cardín Tournament (91 kg), Santa Clara, Cuba, June 1987:

- Finals: Defeated Juan Delis Causse (Cuba) by unanimous decision, 5–0

(gold) X Pan American Games (91 kg), Indianapolis, Indiana, August 1987:

- 1/4: Defeated Julio Sanchez (Puerto Rico) RSC 1
- 1/2: Defeated Michael Bentt (United States) by unanimous decision, 5–0
- Finals: Defeated Juan Antonio Díaz Nieves (Argentina) KO 2 (1:48)

(gold) North American Championships (91 kg), Toronto, Canada, August 1987:

- Finals: Defeated Michael Bentt (United States) by unanimous decision, 3–0 (Savón was given a standing eight count in the 1st rd)

(gold) V World Cup (91 kg), Belgrade, Yugoslavia, October 1987:

- 1/4: Defeated Fred Kaddu (Uganda) by unanimous decision, 5–0
- 1/2: Defeated Ramzan Sebiyev (Soviet Union) by unanimous decision, 5–0
- Finals: Defeated Arnold Vanderlyde (Netherlands) by majority decision, 4–1

Cuba–USA Duals (91 kg), Santa Clara, Cuba, December 1987:

- Defeated Jerry Goff (United States) RSC 1 (1:37)

(gold) XXVII Playa Girón National Championships (91 kg), Sancti Spiritus, Cuba, January 1988:

- Finals: Defeated Roberto Balado (Cuba) by unanimous decision, 5–0

(gold) Ústí Grand Prix (91 kg), Ústí nad Labem, Czechoslovakia, March 1988:

- 1/2: Defeated Henrik Satyka (Poland) RET 1
- Finals: Defeated Rudolf Gavenčiak (Czechoslovakia) RET 3

(gold) Gee-Bee Tournament (91 kg), Helsinki, Finland, April 1988:

- Finals: Defeated Yevgeni Sudakov (Soviet Union) by unanimous decision, 5–0

USA–Cuba Duals (91 kg), Caesars Atlantic City, Atlantic City, New Jersey, April 1988:

- Defeated Ray Mercer (United States) by split decision, 2–1

(gold) XXI Giraldo Córdova Cardín Tournament (91 kg), Las Tunas, Cuba, June 1988:

- Finals: Defeated Juan Delis Causse (Cuba) by unanimous decision, 5–0

(gold) Leningrad International Tournament (91 kg), Leningrad, Soviet Union, June 1988:

- Finals: Defeated Ramzan Sebiyev (Soviet Union) by unanimous decision, 5–0

(gold) TSC Tournament (91 kg), Berlin, East Germany, July 1988:

- Finals: Defeated Maik Heydeck (West Germany) by unanimous decision, 5–0

(gold) XIX Central America and the Caribbean Championships (91 kg), Guatemala City, Guatemala, October 1988:

- Finals: Defeated Luis Godoy (Guatemala) RET 1

(gold) XXVIII Playa Girón National Championships (91 kg), Guantánamo, Cuba, January 1989:

- Finals: Defeated Roberto Balado (Cuba) by unanimous decision, 5–0

AIBA International Challenge (91 kg), Casablanca, Morocco, February 1989:

- Defeated Baik Hyun-man (South Korea) by unanimous decision, 5–0

(gold) XXII Giraldo Córdova Cardín Tournament (91 kg), Pinar del Río, Cuba, June 1989:

- Finals: Defeated Yuri Vaulin (Soviet Union) by walkover

(silver) VII Military Spartakiad of the Friendly Armies of the Socialist Countries (91 kg), Sliven, Bulgaria, June 1989:

- Finals: Lost to Li Dal-Chen (North Korea) KO 1

(gold) V World Championships (91 kg), Moscow, Soviet Union, September 1989:

- 1/8: Defeated Arnold Vanderlyde (Netherlands) RSCH 1
- 1/4: Defeated Hamayak Shabazian (Sweden) 32–1
- 1/2: Defeated Axel Schulz (East Germany) by walkover
- Finals: Defeated Yevgeni Sudakov (Soviet Union) 18–8

Cuba–USA Duals (91 kg), Havana, Cuba, 1989:

- Defeated (no data available) (United States)

(gold) Battle of Carabobo International Tournament (91 kg), Venezuela, 1989:

- (no data available)

(gold) XXIX Playa Girón National Championships (91 kg), Cienfuegos, Cuba, January 1990:

- Finals: Defeated Alberto Almeida (Cuba) RSC 1

AIBA International Challenge (91 kg), West Berlin, West Germany, March 1990:

- Defeated Bert Teuchert (West Germany) 52–12 (5 rds)

(gold) XXIII Giraldo Córdova Cardín Tournament (91 kg), Manzanillo, Cuba, June 1990:

- Finals: Defeated Freddy Rojas (Cuba) RET 1

U.S. Olympic Cup, North America–Europe Duals (91 kg), Salt Lake City, Utah, June 1990:

- Defeated Rafael Akopov (Soviet Union) RET 1 (Akopov's corner threw in the towel at 2:56)

(gold) II Goodwill Games (91 kg), Seattle Center Coliseum, Seattle, Washington, July 1990:

- 1/4: Defeated Javier Álvarez (United States) by unanimous decision, 5–0
- 1/2: Defeated Viktor Akshonov (Soviet Union) by unanimous decision, 5–0 (Savón reportedly elbowed Akshonov the groin while rising from a crouch in the 2nd rd)
- Finals: Defeated Yevgeniy Sudakov (Soviet Union) by unanimous decision, 5–0

(gold) VI World Cup (91 kg), Dublin, Ireland, August 1990:

- 1/4: Defeated Sean O'Regan (Ireland) RSC 1
- 1/2: Defeated René Monse (East Germany) RET 1
- Finals: Defeated Bert Teuchert (West Germany) 29–3 (5 rds)

Cuba–USA Duals (91 kg), Havana, Cuba, 1990:

- Defeated (no data available) (United States)

(gold) XVI Central American and Caribbean Games (91 kg), Mexico City, Mexico, December 1990:

- 1/2: Defeated Víctor Alarcón (Colombia)
- Finals: Defeated José Marrero (Puerto Rico)

(gold) XXX Playa Girón National Championships (91 kg), Camagüey, Cuba, January 1991:

- Finals: Defeated Freddy Rojas (Cuba) on points

(gold) King's Cup (91 kg), Bangkok, Thailand, February 1991:

- Finals: Defeated Bert Teuchert (Germany) by unanimous decision, 5–0

(gold) XXIV Giraldo Córdova Cardín Tournament (91 kg), Sancti Spiritus, Cuba, June 1991:

- Finals: Defeated Joel Donatien (Cuba) RSCH 2

USA–Cuba Duals (91 kg), Fort Bragg, North Carolina, August 1991:

- Defeated John Bray (United States) RSC 1

(gold) XI Pan American Games (91 kg), Havana, Cuba, August 1991:

- 1/2: Defeated Tom Glesby (Canada) RET 1 (2:15)
- Finals: Defeated Shannon Briggs (United States) RSC 1 (Briggs knocked down at 2:08; referee stopped the contest at 2:45)

(gold) VI World Championships (91 kg), Sydney, Australia, November 1991:

- 1/4: Defeated Kirk Johnson (Canada) RET 2
- 1/2: Defeated David Tua (New Zealand) KO 1 (0:22)
- Finals: Defeated Arnold Vanderlyde (Netherlands) 39–15

(gold) XXXI Playa Girón National Championships (91 kg), Pinar del Río, Cuba, January 1992:

- Finals: Defeated Freddy Rojas (Cuba) on points

(gold) BOXAM Cup (91 kg), Barcelona, Spain, February 1992:

- 1/2: Defeated Aleksey Chudinov (Russia) RET 2
- Finals: Defeated Kirk Johnson (Canada) 14–5

AIBA International Challenge (91 kg), Tampa, Florida, April 1992:

- Defeated Chae Sung-bae (South Korea) RSC 1

(gold) XXV Giraldo Córdova Cardín Tournament (91 kg), Santiago de Cuba, Cuba, May 1992:

- Finals: Defeated Freddy Rojas (Cuba) on points

(gold) XXV Summer Olympics (91 kg), Barcelona, Spain, July 1992:

- 1/32: Defeated Krzysztof Rojek (Poland) RSC 2
- 1/16: Defeated Bert Teuchert (Germany) 11–2
- 1/4: Defeated Danell Nicholson (United States) 13–11
- 1/2: Defeated Arnold Vanderlyde (Netherlands) 23–3
- Finals: Defeated David Izonritei (Nigeria) 14–1

(gold) XXXII Playa Girón National Championships (91 kg), Matanzas, Cuba, January 1993:

- 1/16: Defeated Dagoberto Ordoñez (Cuba) RET 2
- 1/8: Defeated Esteban Fuentes (Cuba) RET 1
- 1/4: Defeated Alexis Echeverría (Cuba) RET 1
- 1/2: Defeated Pedro Montalvo (Cuba) 20–6 (4 rds)
- Finals: Defeated Freddy Rojas (Cuba) RSC 1

AIBA International Challenge (91 kg), Istanbul, Turkey, February 1993:

- Defeated Sergei Sakharov (Russia) RSC 4

Europe–North America Duals (91 kg), Berlin, Germany, March 1993:

- Defeated Vojtěch Rückschloss (Czech) RSC 3

(gold) XXVI Giraldo Córdova Cardín Tournament (91 kg), Sancti Spiritus, Cuba, May 1993:

- Finals: Defeated Diosdado Ortega (Cuba)

(gold) VII World Championships (91 kg), Tampere, Finland, June 1993:

- 1/8: Defeated Derrell Dixon (United States) KO 3
- 1/4: Defeated Alexei Lezin (Russia) 13–7
- 1/2: Defeated Stéphane Allouane (France) RSC 2
- Finals: Defeated Georgi Kandelaki (Georgia) by walkover

USA–Cuba Duals (91 kg), Biloxi, Mississippi, September 1993:

- Defeated Derrell Dixon (United States) by unanimous decision, 5–0

(gold) XVII Central American and Caribbean Games (91 kg), Ponce, Puerto Rico, November 1993:

- 1/2: Defeated Julian Skeete (Guyana) RSC 2
- Finals: Defeated Edgardo Santos (Puerto Rico) RSC 2

(gold) XXXIII Playa Girón National Championships (91 kg), Ciego de Ávila, Cuba, January 1994:

- Finals: Defeated Freddy Rojas (Cuba) on points

AIBA International Challenge (91 kg), Dublin, Ireland, March 1994:

- Defeated Georgios Stefanopoulos (Greece) RSCI 2

(silver) XXVII Giraldo Córdova Cardín Tournament (91 kg), Cienfuegos, Cuba, May 1994:

- 1/2: Defeated Santiago Palavecino (Argentina) RSC 1
- Finals: Lost to Freddy Rojas (Cuba) 8–9

(gold) VIII World Cup (91 kg), Bangkok, Thailand, June 1994:

- 1/2: Defeated Georgi Kandelaki (Georgia) 19–4 (5 rds)
- Finals: Defeated René Monse (Germany) RSC 4

(gold) III Goodwill Games (91 kg), Saint Petersburg, Russia, July–August 1994:

- 1/4: Defeated Christophe Mendy (France) 8–6
- 1/2: Defeated Peter Müller (Germany) RSC 2
- Finals: Defeated Sergei Mochalov (Russia) KO 1

USA–Cuba Duals (91 kg), Ledyard, Connecticut, October 1994:

- Defeated Robert Greer (United States) RSC 1 (1:40)

(gold) XXXIV Playa Girón National Championships (91 kg), Manzanillo, Cuba, January 1995:

- Finals: Defeated Freddy Rojas (Cuba)

(gold) XXVIII Giraldo Córdova Cardín Tournament (91 kg), Matanzas, Cuba, February 1995:

- Finals: Defeated Luis Álvarez (Cuba) RSC

(gold) XII Pan American Games (91 kg), Mar del Plata, Argentina, March 1995:

- 1/4: Defeated Angus Lewis (US Virgin Islands) KO 1
- 1/2: Defeated Santiago Palavecino (Argentina) RSCH 1
- Finals: Defeated Lamon Brewster (United States) RET 2 (2:15)

(gold) World Championships (91 kg), Berlin, Germany, May 1995:

- 1/8: Defeated Joon Hyon Yoon (South Korea) RSC 1
- 1/4: Defeated Georgi Kandelaki (Georgia) by walkover
- 1/2: Defeated Christophe Mendy (France) 9–6
- Finals: Defeated Luan Krasniqi (Germany) RSC 2 (9–0) (Krasniqi knocked down at 0:08 of the 1st rd; Krasniqi was given a standing eight count at 2:25 of the 1st rd, and at the 1:08 of the 2nd rd; Krasniqi disqualified for holding at 2:45 after being repeatedly warned by the referee)

National match-up (91 kg), Havana, Cuba, July 1995:

- Defeated Luis Álvarez (Cuba) RSC

(gold) XXI Central America and the Caribbean Championships (91 kg), Mexico City, Mexico, September 1995:

- 1/2: Defeated O. Vasquez (Venezuela) RET 1
- Finals: Defeated Julio Pacheco (Mexico) RET 1

AIBA International Challenge (91 kg), Macon, Georgia, October 1995:

- Defeated Sinan Şamil Sam (Turkey) 11–2 (5 rds)

USA–Cuba Duals (91 kg), Ledyard, Connecticut, November 1995:

- Defeated Nate Jones (United States) 6–2

(gold) XXXV Playa Girón National Championships (91 kg), Santiago de Cuba, Cuba, January 1996:

- Finals: Defeated Freddy Rojas (Cuba) on points

(gold) XLVII Strandzha Cup (91 kg), Sofia, Bulgaria, February 1996:

- 1/4: Defeated Nedjadi Belahouel (Algeria) RET 3
- 1/2: Defeated Gioacchino Mocerino (Italy) RET 2
- Finals: Defeated Christophe Mendy (France) by walkover

(gold) Ústí Grand Prix (91 kg), Ústí nad Labem, Czech Republic, February 1996:

- 1/4: Defeated Peter Müller (Germany) RET 1
- 1/2: Defeated Wojciech Bartnik (Poland) 14–0
- Finals: Defeated Sergey Dychkov (Belarus) RET 2

(gold) XXVII Chemistry Cup (91 kg), Halle, Germany, February–March 1996:

- 1/2: Defeated Oleg Belikov (Ukraine) RSC 1
- Finals: Defeated Luan Krasniqi (Germany) RET 3

(gold) XXIX Giraldo Córdova Cardín Tournament (91 kg), Camagüey, Cuba, April–May 1996:

- 1/4: Defeated Juan Delis Causse (Cuba) RSC 3
- 1/2: Defeated Roberto Camilo (Cuba) RSC 2
- Finals: Defeated Michel López Núñez (Cuba) RSC 2

(gold) XXII Central America and the Caribbean Championships (91 kg), Guadalajara, Mexico, May 1996:

- Finals: Defeated Benjamín García (Mexico) RSC 1

(gold) XXVI Summer Olympics (91 kg), Atlanta, Georgia, July–August 1996:

- 1/32: Defeated Andrey Kurnyavka (Kyrgyzstan) 9–3 (Kurnyavka was given a standing eight count at 0:48 of the 2nd rd)
- 1/16: Defeated Kwamena Turkson (Sweden) RSC 1 (2:29)
- 1/4: Defeated Georgi Kandelaki (Georgia) 20–4 (Kandelaki was given a standing eight count at 0:54 of the 3rd rd)
- 1/2: Defeated Luan Krasniqi (Germany) by walkover
- Finals: Defeated David Defiagbon (Canada) 20–2

(gold) Copenhagen Cup (91 kg), Copenhagen, Denmark, November 1996:

- 1/4: Defeated Sergei Volodin (Russia) KO 1
- 1/2: Defeated Mark Simmons (Canada) by walkover
- Finals: Defeated Rune Lillebuen (Norway) RET 2

XXXVI Playa Girón National Championships (91 kg), Holguín, Cuba, February 1997:

- 1/4: Lost to Juan Delis Causse (Cuba) KO 2 (1:35)

(gold) XXX Giraldo Córdova Cardín Tournament (91 kg), Pinar del Río, Cuba, June 1997:

- 1/4: Defeated Benjamín García (Mexico) RSC 2
- 1/2: Defeated Mark Simmons (Canada) 12–8 (5 rds)
- Finals: Defeated Freddy Rojas (Cuba) 14–4 (5 rds)

National match-up (91 kg), Havana, Cuba, August 1997:

- Defeated Juan Delis Causse (Cuba) on points (5 rds)

(gold) Pan American Tournament (91 kg), Medellín, Colombia, September 1997:

- 1/2: Defeated Leo Simonis (Argentina) RSC 2
- Finals: Defeated John Arroyo Escobar (Colombia) RSCH 1

(gold) World Championships (91 kg), Budapest, Hungary, October 1997:

- 1/16: Defeated Kwamena Turkson (Norway) 4–2 (5 rds)
- 1/8: Defeated Igor Kshinin (Russia) 25–4 (5 rds)
- 1/4: Defeated Mark Simmons (Canada) 15–4 (5 rds)
- 1/2: Defeated Tue Bjørn Thomsen (Denmark) RSC 3
- Finals: Lost to Ruslan Chagaev (Uzbekistan) 4–14 (5 rds)

On 8 February 1998, the AIBA stripped the championship of Chagaev for having 2 professional bouts in the United States before the tournament.

(gold) XXXVI Playa Girón National Championships (91 kg), Villa Clara, Cuba, January–February 1998:

- 1/4: Defeated Michel López Núñez (Cuba) RET 3
- 1/2: Defeated Yusmel García (Cuba) RSC 2
- Finals: Defeated Juan Delis Causse (Cuba) 19–6 (5 rds)

(gold) Ahmet Cömert Memorial (91 kg), Istanbul, Turkey, February 1998:

- 1/4: Defeated Zoltán Kiss (Hungary) RET
- 1/2: Defeated Roman Sukhoterin (Kazakhstan) RSC 1
- Finals: Defeated Giacobbe Fragomeni (Italy) by walkover

(gold) Beijing Open Tournament (91 kg), Beijing, China, March 1998

- Finals: Defeated Ma Jing Wei (China)

(gold) XXXI Giraldo Córdova Cardín Tournament (91 kg), Havana, Cuba, June 1998:

- 1/4: Defeated José Gonzalez (Venezuela) RSC 1 (0:55)
- 1/2: Defeated Leo Simonis (Argentina) RSC 1 (0:57)
- Finals: Defeated Juan Delis Causse (Cuba) 19–2 (5 rds)

(gold) IX World Cup (91 kg), Chongqing, China, June 1998:

- 1/4: Defeated Georges Akono (Cameroon) RSC 1
- 1/2: Defeated Ma Jing Wei (China) RSC 1
- Finals: Defeated Giacobbe Fragomeni (Italy) by walkover

(gold) IV Goodwill Games (91 kg), New York City, July 1998:

- 1/4: Defeated Dmitry Gerasimov (Russia) RSCO (11–2)
- 1/2: Defeated Malcolm Tann (United States) RET 3 (1:20)
- Finals: Defeated DaVarryl Williamson (United States) KO 1 (0:55)

(gold) XVIII Central American and Caribbean Games (91 kg), Maracaibo, Venezuela, August 1998:

- 1/2: Defeated Alejandro Virgen (Mexico) 26–8 (4 rds)
- Finals: Defeated Jhony Molina (Venezuela) RSC 2 (1:00)

(silver) XXXVII Playa Girón National Championships (91 kg), Sancti Spiritus, Cuba, January 1999:

- 1/8: Defeated Luis Ortíz (Cuba) RET 4
- 1/4: Defeated Alexis Castillo (Cuba) RSC 4
- 1/2: Defeated Freddy Rojas (Cuba) 17–2 (4 rds)
- Finals: Lost to Odlanier Solís (Cuba) 2–4 (4 rds)

(silver) Strandzha Cup (91 kg), Plovdiv, Bulgaria, February 1999:

- Finals: Lost to Ruslan Chagaev (Uzbekistan) 2–7 (4 rds)

(bronze) Ústí Grand Prix (91 kg), Ústí nad Labem, Czech Republic, March 1999:

- 1/4: Defeated Zoltán Kiss (Hungary) RSC 2
- 1/2: Lost to Radim Marovski (Czech) 2–4 (4 rds)

National Tournament of Champions (91 kg), Havana, Cuba, April 1999:

- 1/4: Lost to Noel Pérez Bió (Cuba) KO 2

(gold) XXXII Giraldo Córdova Cardín Tournament (91 kg), Villa Clara, Cuba, June 1999:

- 1/2: Defeated Noel Pérez Bió (Cuba) 15–3 (4 rds)
- Finals: Defeated Mohamed Azzaoui (Algeria) RSC 2

(silver) X World Championships (91 kg), Houston, Texas, August 1999:

- 1/16: Defeated Deividas Nekrašas (Lithuania) RSCH 3 (1:46)
- 1/8: Defeated Andrei Kombarov (Russia) 7–5 (4 rds)
- 1/4: Defeated Ruslan Chagaev (Kazakhstan) 9–1 (4 rds)
- 1/2: Defeated Kevin Evans (Wales) RET 4 (0:51)
- Finals: Lost to Michael Bennett (United States) due to boycotting the final

(silver) XXXVIII Playa Girón National Championships (91 kg), Guantánamo, Cuba, January 2000:

- 1/8: Defeated Alexis Castillo (Cuba) RSC 1
- 1/4: Defeated Freddy Rojas (Cuba) RSC 4
- 1/2: Defeated Alberto Almeida (Cuba) RSC 1
- Finals: Lost to Odlanier Solís (Cuba) 3–6 (4 rds)

(gold) Ústí Grand Prix (91 kg), Ústí nad Labem, Czech Republic, March 2000:

- 1/2: Defeated Sultan Ibragimov (Russia) 10–4 (4 rds)
- Finals: Defeated Alexander Povernov (Germany) by walkover

Ukraine–Cuba Duals (91 kg), Kyiv, Ukraine, March 2000:

- Defeated Alexandr Yatsenko (Ukraine) (4 rds)
- Defeated Vitali Nayasov (Ukraine) by unanimous decision, 3–0 (4 rds)

National Olympic Trials (91 kg), Havana, Cuba, June 2000:

- 1/4: Defeated Yusmel García (Cuba) RSCO 3
- 1/2: Defeated Alexis Castillo (Cuba) RSC 3
- Finals: Defeated Noel Pérez Bió (Cuba) 6–4 (4 rds)

(gold) XXXIII Giraldo Córdova Cardín Tournament (91 kg), Las Tunas, Cuba, July 2000:

- 1/4: Defeated Yusmel García (Cuba) by walkover
- 1/2: Defeated Mahomed Adamov (Kazakhstan) RSC 3 (1:10)
- Finals: Defeated Odlanier Solís (Cuba) 4–3 (4 rds)

(gold) XXVII Summer Olympics (91 kg), Sydney, Australia, September 2000:

- 1/16: Defeated Ojemaye Rasmus (Nigeria) RSCO 2 (18–3)
- 1/4: Defeated Michael Bennett (United States) RSCO 3 (23–8)
- 1/2: Defeated Sebastian Köber (Germany) 19–8 (4 rds)
- Finals: Defeated Sultan Ibragimov (Russia) 21–13 (4 rds) (Savón suffered a deep cut under his left eye at 1:41 of the 4th rd)

=== Retirement ===
Savón announced his retirement from the ring, but helped train Cuba's fighters for the 2004 Athens Olympics. After winning his third Olympic gold at the 2000 Summer Olympics in Sydney, Savón announced his retirement at age 33.

== Later life ==
In February of the following year with Fidel Castro also present, Savón had the song "You Love Us" dedicated to him by the Manic Street Preachers, who became the first western rock band to play in Cuba.

In 2018, Savón was arrested amid accusations that he had raped an underage boy. The Cuban authorities never officially disclosed any details about his trial and conviction. In January 2025 it was reported that Savón was released on parole at the end of 2024 with about two years left on his original sentence.
