= Boxing at the 1992 Summer Olympics – Heavyweight =

Heavyweight boxing at the Games of the XXV Olympiad
- Venue: Pavelló Club Joventut Badalona
- Dates: 28 July – 8 August
- Competitors: 23 from 23 nations

Medalists
| 1st place, gold medalist(s) | | Félix Savón | Cuba |
| 2nd place, silver medalist(s) | | David Izonritei | Nigeria |
| 3rd place, bronze medalist(s) | | David Tua | New Zealand |
| 3rd place, bronze medalist(s) | | Arnold Vanderlyde | Netherlands |

The men's heavyweight event was part of the boxing programme at the 1992 Summer Olympics. The weight class allowed boxers of up to 91 kilograms to compete. The competition was held from 28 July to 8 August 1992. 23 boxers from 23 nations competed.

== Medalists ==
| Gold | Félix Savón; Cuba |
| Silver | David Izonritei; Nigeria |
| Bronze | David Tua; New Zealand |
| Bronze | Arnold Vanderlyde; Netherlands |

== Results ==
The following boxers took part in the event:

| Rank | Name | Country |
|---|---|---|
| 1 | Félix Savón | Cuba |
| 2 | David Izonritei | Nigeria |
| 3T | David Tua | New Zealand |
| 3T | Arnold Vanderlyde | Netherlands |
| 5T | Vojtěch Rückschloss | Czechoslovakia |
| 5T | Kirk Johnson | Canada |
| 5T | Paul Douglas | Ireland |
| 5T | Danell Nicholson | United States |
| 9T | Georgios Stefanopoulos | Greece |
| 9T | José Ortega | Spain |
| 9T | Joseph Akhasamba | Kenya |
| 9T | Morteza Shiri | Iran |
| 9T | Chae Seong-bae | South Korea |
| 9T | Aleksey Chudinov | Unified Team |
| 9T | Željko Mavrović | Croatia |
| 9T | Bert Teuchert | Germany |
| 17T | Emilio Leti | Western Samoa |
| 17T | John Pettersson | Sweden |
| 17T | Vidas Markevičius | Lithuania |
| 17T | Mark Hulstrøm | Denmark |
| 17T | Paul Lawson | Great Britain |
| 17T | Elio Ibarra | Argentina |
| 17T | Krzysztof Rojek | Poland |

=== First round ===
- Vojtěch Rückschloss (TCH) – BYE
- Georgios Stefanopoulos (GRE) – BYE
- David Tua (NZL) – BYE
- José Ortega (ESP) – BYE
- Kirk Johnson (CAN) – BYE
- Joseph Akhasamba (KEN) – BYE
- David Izonritei (NGR) – BYE
- Morteza Shiri (IRN) – BYE
- Arnold Vanderlyde (NED) def. Emelio Leti (SAM), 14:0
- Paul Douglas (IRL) def. John Pettersson (SWE), 8:1
- Alexey Chudinov (EUN) def. Vidas Markevičius (LTU), 7:3
- Željko Mavrović (CRO) def. Mark Hulström (DEN), 8:2
- Danell Nicholson (USA) def. Paul Lawson (GBR), 10:2
- Bert Teuchiert (GER) def. Elio Ibarra (ARG), 5:1
- Félix Savón (CUB) def. Krysztof Rojek (POL), RSC-2 (01:12)

=== Second round ===
- Vojtěch Rückschloss (TCH) def. Georgios Stefanopoulos (GRE), RSC-1 (02:27)
- David Tua (NZL) def. José Ortega (ESP), RSCH-2 (03:00)
- Kirk Johnson (CAN) def. Joseph Akhasamba (KEN), RSC-2 (02:42)
- David Izonritei (NGR) def. Morteza Shiri (IRN), RSC-3 (01:35)
- Arnold Vanderlyde (NED) def. Sung Bae Chae (KOR), 14:13
- Paul Douglas (IRL) def. Alexey Chudinov (EUN), 15:9
- Danell Nicholson (USA) def. Zelko Mavrovic (CRO), 9:6
- Félix Savón (CUB) def. Bert Teuchiert (GER), 11:2

=== Quarterfinals ===
- David Tua (NZL) def. Vojtěch Rückschloss (TCH), RSC-3 (00:16)
- David Izonritei (NGR) def. Kirk Johnson (CAN), 9:5
- Arnold Vanderlyde (NED) def. Paul Douglas (IRL), RSC-1 (01:30)
- Félix Savón (CUB) def. Danell Nicholson (USA), 13:11

=== Semifinals ===
- David Izonritei (NGR) def. David Tua (NZL), 12:7
- Félix Savón (CUB) def. Arnold Vanderlyde (NED), 23:3

=== Final ===
- Félix Savón (CUB) def. David Izonritei (NGR), 14:1
