= Željko Mavrović =

Croatian boxer

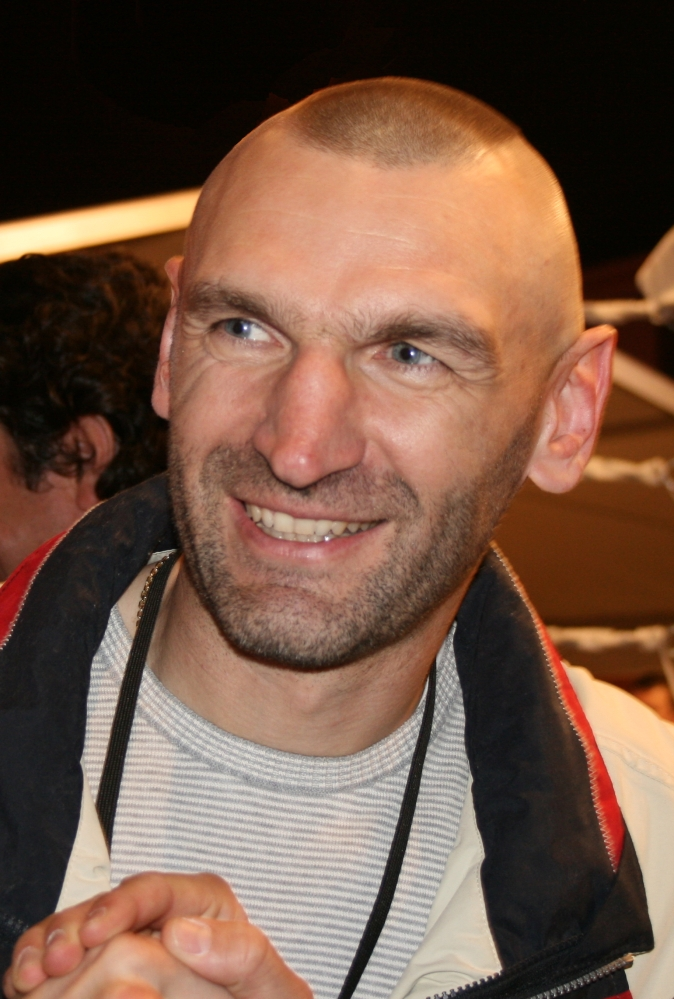
- Mavrović in 2008

Personal information
- Nicknames: Zed; Šaka sa Srednjaka (Fist from Srednjaci); Irokez (Iroquois)
- Nationality: Croatian
- Born: Željko Mavrović; 17 February 1969 (age 57) Zagreb, SR Croatia, SFR Yugoslavia
- Height: 1.91 m (6 ft 3 in)
- Weight: Heavyweight

Boxing career
- Reach: 77 in (196 cm)
- Stance: Orthodox

Boxing record
- Total fights: 28
- Wins: 27
- Win by KO: 22
- Losses: 1
Medal record
Men's amateur boxing
Representing Yugoslavia
Mediterranean Games
| Gold medal – first place | 1991 Athens | Heavyweight |

Željko Mavrović (pronounced [ˈʒěːʎko ˈmɑːvroʋitɕ]; born 17 February 1969) is a Croatian former professional boxer who competed from 1993 to 1998. In 1998, as an undefeated challenger, he faced Lennox Lewis for the WBC heavyweight title, but lost in what would be his final fight. After retiring from boxing, Mavrović became an entrepreneur.

== Early years ==
Mavrović was born in Zagreb. He was raised in the neighborhood Srednjaci (which is the source of his nickname Šaka sa Srednjaka or Fist from Srednjaci).

== Amateur career ==
As an amateur boxer, Mavrović was the Mediterranean champion in 1991 and Croatian champion in 1991 and 1992. He quickly progressed from the 75 to the 91 kg weight class.

=== Highlights ===
European Junior Championships (Middleweight), Copenhagen, Denmark, September 1986:

- 1/8: Lost to Mario Nesemann (East Germany) by unanimous decision, 0–5

(gold) Balkan Junior Championships (Light heavyweight), Patras, Greece, November 1987:

- Finals: Defeated Petru Ohaci (Romania)

Usti Grand Prix (Light heavyweight), Ústí nad Labem, Czechoslovakia, March 1988:

- 1/4: Lost to Daniel Stantien (Czechoslovakia) by majority decision, 1–4

USA–Europe Duals (Heavyweight), Las Vegas Convention Center, Las Vegas, Nevada, June 1988:

- Lost to Ray Mercer (United States) RSC 1 (2:00)

XXIV Summer Olympics (Heavyweight), Seoul, South Korea, September 1988:

- 1/8: Lost to Baik Hyun-Man (South Korea) by unanimous decision, 0–5

(silver) Trofeo Italia (Heavyweight), Mestre, Venice, Italy, March 1989:

- 1/8: Defeated Hamayak Shabazian (Sweden) by unanimous decision, 5–0
- 1/4: Defeated Salih Ozkaraaslan (Turkey) by unanimous decision, 5–0
- 1/2: Defeated Bert Teuchert (West Germany) by unanimous decision, 5–0
- Finals: Lost to Axel Schulz (East Germany) by majority decision, 1–4

(silver) Intercup (Heavyweight), Cologne, West Germany, April 1989:

- Finals: Lost to Peter Stettinger (West Germany) by majority decision, 1–4

European Championships (Heavyweight), Athens, Greece, May 1989:

- 1/8: Lost to Axel Schulz (East Germany) by split decision, 2–3

World Championships (Heavyweight), Moscow, Soviet Union, September 1989:

- 1/8: Lost to Yevgeny Sudakov (Soviet Union) on points, 4–18

Goodwill Games (Heavyweight), Seattle, Washington, July 1990:

- 1/4: Lost to Yevgeny Sudakov (Soviet Union) by split decision, 2–3

USA–Yugoslavia Duals (Heavyweight), Rapid City, South Dakota, January 1990:

- Defeated John Bray (United States) by unanimous decision, 3–0

(gold) Trofeo Italia (Heavyweight), Mestre, Venice, Italy, March 1990:

- 1/2: Defeated José Ortega (Spain) RSCI 3
- Finals: Defeated Marcelino Filho (Brazil) by unanimous decision, 5–0

Yugoslavia–USA Duals (Heavyweight), Umag, Yugoslavia, July 1990:

- Defeated James Johnson (United States) by unanimous decision, 3–0

(gold) Copenhagen Cup (Heavyweight), Copenhagen, Denmark, November 1990:

- Finals: Defeated Tom Glesby (Canada) by unanimous decision, 5–0

European Championships (Heavyweight), Stockholm, Sweden, May 1991:

- 1/8: Defeated Vasile Adumitroaie (Romania) on points, 31–8
- 1/4: Lost to Arnold Vanderlijde (Netherlands) on points, 17–20

(gold) Trofeo Italia (Heavyweight), Mestre, Venice, Italy, March 1991:

- 1/4: Defeated Mikael Lindblad (Sweden) RET 1
- 1/2: Defeated Vasile Adumitroaie (Romania) RET 3
- Finals: Defeated Peter Stettinger (Germany) by unanimous decision, 5–0

(gold) Box-Am Tournament (Heavyweight), Almeria, Spain, March 1991:

- Finals: Defeated Freddy Rojas (Cuba) on points

(gold) XI Mediterranean Games (Heavyweight), Athens, Greece, July 1991:

- 1/2: Defeated M. A. Ibrahim Mohamed (Egypt)
- Finals: Defeated Georgios Stefanopoulos (Greece) on points, 20–17

(silver) Chemistry Cup (Heavyweight), Halle, Germany, March 1992:

- 1/8: Defeated Peter Hart (Hungary) RET 2
- 1/4: Defeated Paul Douglas (Ireland) on points, 17–5
- 1/2: Defeated Paul Lawson (England) by walkover
- Finals: Lost to Bert Teuchert (Germany) on points, 7–8

XXV Summer Olympics (Heavyweight), Barcelona, Spain, July 1992:

- 1/16: Defeated Mark Hulstrøm (Denmark) on points, 8–2
- 1/8: Lost to Danell Nicholson (United States) on points, 6–9

Mavrović had 140 fights as an amateur, compiling an amateur record of 124 wins, 16 losses.

== Professional career ==
Upon turning professional, he won the EBU Champion of Europe title in 1995 and retained his title through 1996 and 1997, defending it seven times.

In 1998, he went up against Lennox Lewis for the world heavyweight champion title, but lost after twelve rounds via unanimous decision 119–109, 117–112, and 117–111. Although he was outclassed by Lewis in the fight, his bold performance drew appreciative comments from boxing insiders. Lewis' manager Frank Maloney said that "Mavrović must have 240lb of steel in his chin" after the fight. Lewis described the fight as the most awkward win of his career, citing sauna-like conditions in the ring, as well as Mavrović's agility, motivation and preparedness.

Mavrović never fought again after this bout. In the next years, he was scheduled a few times against quality opposition such as Hasim Rahman in 1999 (where his late replacement Oleg Maskaev then knocked Rahman out of the ring in a well-remembered fight), but he always had to pull out due to injuries and he ultimately had to finish his career due to an undisclosed illness.

In December 2012 Mavrović announced his return to professional boxing. A match with Serbian Cruiserweight boxer Enad Ličina was scheduled for April 2013, but after breaking a rib during training just a few weeks before the scheduled match his return was delayed and then canceled.

Mavrović served as the boxing director for the Croatian Boxing Federation during the 2014 European Youth Boxing Championships in Zagreb. After the incident where Croatian boxer Vido Loncar assaulted and seriously injured a referee after a loss, he defended Loncar saying "I believe that he is not a butcher or as bad as this act makes him look. This was part of his excessive ambition in that moment". Loncar was subsequently banned from boxing for life.

== Honors ==
His Golden Glove remains the biggest trophy in the history of Croatian heavyweight boxing, and he was named the Croatian sportsperson of the year twice. He was also distinctive for his Mohawk hairstyle, which led to a later nickname Irokez (Croatian for Iroquois).

== Professional boxing record ==
27 Wins (22 knockouts, 5 decisions), 1 Loss (0 knockouts, 1 decision)
| Result | Record | Opponent | Type | Round | Date | Location | Notes |
| Loss | 27–1 | (United Kingdom) Lennox Lewis | UD | 12 | 26 Sep 1998 | (United States) Mohegan Sun Arena, Montville, Connecticut, U.S. | For WBC heavyweight title |
| Win | 27–0 | (Italy) Vincenzo Cantatore | TKO | 4 (12) | 18 Oct 1997 | Vienna, Austria | Defended European heavyweight title |
| Win | 26–0 | (Hungary) Lajos Eros | TKO | 5 (12), 2:42 | 12 Jul 1997 | (United Kingdom) Olympia, London, England | Defended European heavyweight title |
| Win | 25–0 | (United Kingdom) Julius Francis | TKO | 8 (12) | 15 Feb 1997 | Kurhalle Oberlaa, Vienna, Austria | Defended European heavyweight title |
| Win | 24–0 | (United Kingdom) Clifton Mitchell | TKO | 2 | 2 Nov 1996 | Olympia Eisstadion, Garmisch-Partenkirchen, Germany | Defended European heavyweight title |
| Win | 23–0 | (United States) Mark Anthony Wills | RTD | 8 (10) | 22 Jun 1996 | Westfalenstadion, Dortmund, Germany | |
| Win | 22–0 | (France) Christophe Bizot | UD | 12 | 20 Apr 1996 | Düsseldorf, Germany | Defended European heavyweight title |
| Win | 21–0 | (Poland) Przemyslaw Saleta | KO | 1 (12), 2:58 | 9 Dec 1995 | Hanns-Martin-Schleyer-Halle, Stuttgart, Germany | Defended European heavyweight title. |
| Win | 20–0 | (United Kingdom) Michael Murray | KO | 4 (8) | 14 Oct 1995 | Olympiahalle, Munich, Germany | |
| Win | 19–0 | (United States) Ken Smith | KO | 2 (10), 2:55 | 17 Jun 1995 | (United States) Aladdin Hotel & Casino, Las Vegas, Nevada, U.S. | |
| Win | 18–0 | (France) Christophe Bizot | TKO | 11 | 11 Apr 1995 | Palais des sports Marcel-Cerdan, Levallois-Perret, France | Won vacant European heavyweight title |
| Win | 17–0 | (United States) Mark Young | RTD | 5 (8), 3:00 | 25 Mar 1995 | Düsseldorf, Germany | |
| Win | 16–0 | (United States) Nathaniel Fitch | KO | 1 | 11 Feb 1995 | Festhalle, Frankfurt, Germany | |
| Win | 15–0 | (Russia) Oleg Savenko | KO | 3 | 26 Nov 1994 | Wuppertal, Germany | Won vacant German International (BDB) heavyweight title |
| Win | 14–0 | (United States) Marion Wilson | PTS | 8 | 8 Oct 1994 | Gerry Weber Stadium, Halle, Germany | |
| Win | 13–0 | (United States) Jerry Jones | PTS | 10 | 17 Sep 1994 | Wilhelm-Dopatka-Halle, Leverkusen, Germany | |
| Win | 12–0 | (United States) James Pritchard | UD | 10 | 18 Jun 1994 | Bismark Hotel, Chicago, Illinois, United States | |
| Win | 11–0 | (United States) Marshall Tillman | TKO | 1 | 4 Jun 1994 | Westfalenhallen, Dortmund, Germany | |
| Win | 10–0 | (United States) Jimmy Bills | KO | 1 | 7 May 1994 | Oberwerth Halle, Koblenz, Germany | |
| Win | 9–0 | (United States) Mike Dixon | TKO | 4 (?), 1:25 | 26 Mar 1994 | Westfalenhallen, Dortmund, Germany | |
| Win | 8–0 | (United States) Will Hinton | TKO | 4 (6), 1:37 | 5 Feb 1994 | Aladdin Hotel & Casino, Las Vegas, Nevada, United States | |
| Win | 7–0 | (United States) Kimmuel Odum | PTS | 8 | 11 Dec 1993 | Philips Halle, Düsseldorf, Germany | |
| Win | 6–0 | (United States) David Bey | TKO | 4 | 16 Oct 1993 | Koblenz, Germany | |
| Win | 5–0 | (Netherlands) Marco van Spaendonck | TKO | 1 (?), 1:37 | 18 Sep 1993 | Philips Halle, Düsseldorf, Germany | |
| Win | 4–0 | (United States) Webster Vinson | KO | 2 | 7 Aug 1993 | (United States) Atlantic City, New Jersey, U.S. | |
| Win | 3–0 | (United States) John Morton | KO | 3 | 26 Jun 1993 | Alsterdorfer Sporthalle, Hamburg, Germany | |
| Win | 2–0 | (United Kingdom) Chris Harbourne | TKO | 1 | 1 May 1993 | Sporthalle Charlottenburg, Berlin, Germany | |
| Win | 1–0 | (Belgium) Bruno Podgorny | TKO | 3 | 20 Mar 1993 | Philips Halle, Düsseldorf, Germany | |

== Retirement and later years ==
After retirement, he went into agricultural business. He opened "Eko-centar Mavrović" in Sloboština near Požega where he produced his line of natural, eco-friendly food. After initial success his business fell into financial problems in the early 2010s.
