= Boxing at the 1988 Summer Olympics – Heavyweight =

Olympic boxing tournament

Heavyweight boxing at the Games of the XXIV Olympiad
- Venue: Jamsil Students' Gymnasium
- Dates: 22 September – 1 October 1988
- Competitors: 18 from 18 nations

Medalists
1st place, gold medalist(s)		Ray Mercer	United States
2nd place, silver medalist(s)		Baik Hyun-man	South Korea
3rd place, bronze medalist(s)		Andrzej Gołota	Poland
3rd place, bronze medalist(s)		Arnold Vanderlyde	Netherlands

The men's heavyweight event was part of the boxing programme at the 1988 Summer Olympics. The weight class allowed boxers of up to 91 kilograms to compete. The competition was held from 22 September to 1 October 1988. 18 boxers from 18 nations competed. 27-year-old Ray Mercer, who took up boxing only four years prior, won the gold medal.

== Medalists ==
Gold	Ray Mercer; United States
Silver	Baik Hyun-man; South Korea
Bronze	Andrzej Gołota; Poland
Bronze	Arnold Vanderlyde; Netherlands

== Results ==
The following boxers took part in the event:

Rank	Name	Country
1	Ray Mercer	United States
2	Baik Hyun-man	South Korea
3T	Andrzej Gołota	Poland
3T	Arnold Vanderlyde	Netherlands
5T	Maik Heydeck	East Germany
5T	Harold Obunga	Kenya
5T	Luigi Gaudiano	Italy
5T	Gyula Alvics	Hungary
9T	Juan Antonio Díaz	Argentina
9T	Željko Mavrović	Yugoslavia
9T	Svilen Rusinov	Bulgaria
9T	Tualau Fale	Tonga
9T	Ramzan Sebiyev	Soviet Union
9T	Rudolf Gavenčiak	Czechoslovakia
9T	Henry Akinwande	Great Britain
9T	Tom Glesby	Canada
17T	Claus Børge Nielsen	Denmark
17T	José Ortega	Spain

=== First round ===
- Tom Glesby (CAN) def. Claus Nielsen (DEN), RSC-2
- Gyula Alvics (HUN) def. José Ortega (ESP), 5:0

=== Second round ===
- Maik Heydeck (GDR) def. Juan Antonio Diaz (ARG), 5:0
- Baik Hyun-Man (KOR) def. Zeljko Mavrovic (YUG), 5:0
- Andrzej Golota (POL) def. Svilen Rusinov (BUL), 5:0
- Harold Obunga (KEN) def. Tualau Fale (TNG), RSC-1
- Luigi Gaudiano (ITA) def. Ramzan Sebiyev (URS), 3:2
- Ray Mercer (USA) def. Rudolf Gavenciak (TCH), RSC-3
- Arnold Vanderlyde (HOL) def. Henry Akinwande (GBR), 3:2
- Gyula Alvics (HUN) def. Tom Glesby (CAN), RSC-2

=== Quarterfinals ===
- Baik Hyun-Man (KOR) def. Maik Heydeck (GDR), RSC-1
- Andrzej Golota (POL) def. Harold Obunga (KEN), 5:0
- Ray Mercer (USA) def. Luigi Gaudiano (ITA), KO-1
- Arnold Vanderlyde (HOL) def. Gyula Alvics (HUN), 5:0

=== Semifinals ===
- Baik Hyun-Man (KOR) def. Andrzej Golota (POL), RSC-2
- Ray Mercer (USA) def. Arnold Vanderlyde (HOL), RSC-2

=== Final ===
- Ray Mercer (USA) def. Baik Hyun-Man (KOR), KO-1
