= Boxing at the 2000 Summer Olympics – Heavyweight =

Boxing competitions

Men's heavyweight boxing at the Games of the XXVII Olympiad
- Venue: Sydney Convention and Exhibition Centre
- Date: 21 September to 30 September 2000
- Competitors: 16 from 16 nations

Medalists
1st place, gold medalist(s)		Félix Savón	Cuba
2nd place, silver medalist(s)		Sultan Ibragimov	Russia
3rd place, bronze medalist(s)		Vladimer Tchanturia	Georgia
3rd place, bronze medalist(s)		Sebastian Köber	Germany

The men's heavyweight boxing competition at the 2000 Olympic Games in Sydney was held from 21 September to 30 September at the Sydney Convention and Exhibition Centre. Félix Savón became the third boxer to win three consecutive Olympic gold medals, along with his countryman Teofilo Stevenson, and Hungary's Laszlo Papp. Shortly after the victory ceremony, he announced his retirement.

== Competition format ==
Like all Olympic boxing events, the competition was a straight single-elimination tournament. This event consisted of 16 boxers who have qualified for the competition through various qualifying tournaments held in 1999 and 2000. The competition began with a preliminary round on 21 September, where the number of competitors was reduced to 8, and concluded with the final on 30 September. Both semi-final losers were awarded bronze medals.

All bouts consisted of four rounds of two minutes each, with one-minute breaks between rounds. Punches scored only if the white area on the front of the glove made full contact with the front of the head or torso of the opponent. Five judges scored each bout; three of the judges had to signal a scoring punch within one second for the punch to score. The winner of the bout was the boxer who scored the most valid punches by the end of the bout.

== Competitors ==
Name	Country
Mark Simmons	Canada
Rouhollah Hosseini	Iran
Magomed Ariphadjiev	Azerbaijan
Sebastian Köber	Germany
Rasmus Ojemaye	Nigeria
Félix Savón	Cuba
Wojciech Bartnik	Poland
Michael Bennett	United States
Vladimer Tchanturia	Georgia
Mustafa Amru Mahmoud	Egypt
Ruslan Chagaev	Uzbekistan
Oleksandr Yatsenko	Ukraine
Mohamed Azzaoui	Algeria
Jackson Chanet	France
Pauga Lalau	Samoa
Sultan Ibragimov	Russia

== Schedule ==
All times are Australian Time (UTC+10)

Date	Time	Round
Thursday, September 21, 2000	13:00 & 19:30	Round of 16
Tuesday, September 26, 2000	13:00 & 19:30	Quarterfinals
Thursday, September 28, 2000	19:30	Semifinals
Saturday, September 30, 2000	13:00	Final Bout

== Results ==
Round of 16
Mark Simmons (CAN)	11
Rouhollah Hosseini (IRI)	6
Magomed Aripgadjiev (AZE)	4
Sebastian Köber (GER)	9
Rasmus Ojemaye (NGR)
Félix Savón (CUB)	RSC
Wojciech Bartnik (POL)	2
Michael Bennett (USA)	11
Vladimer Tchanturia (GEO)	RSC
Mustafa Amru Mahmoud (EGY)
Ruslan Chagaev (UZB)	15
Oleksandr Yatsenko (UKR)	2
Mohamed Azzaoui (ALG)
Jackson Chanet (FRA)	RSC
Pauga Lalau (SAM)
Sultan Ibragimov (RUS)	RSC

Quarter-finals
Mark Simmons (CAN)
Sebastian Köber (GER)	RSC
Félix Savón (CUB)	RSC
Michael Bennett (USA)
Vladimer Tchanturia (GEO)	18
Ruslan Chagaev (UZB)	12
Jackson Chanet (FRA)	13
Sultan Ibragimov (RUS)	18

Semi-finals
Sebastian Köber (GER)	8
Félix Savón (CUB)	14
Vladimer Tchanturia (GEO)	4
Sultan Ibragimov (RUS)	19

Final
Félix Savón (CUB)	21
Sultan Ibragimov (RUS)	13
