= Arnold Vanderlyde =

Dutch boxer

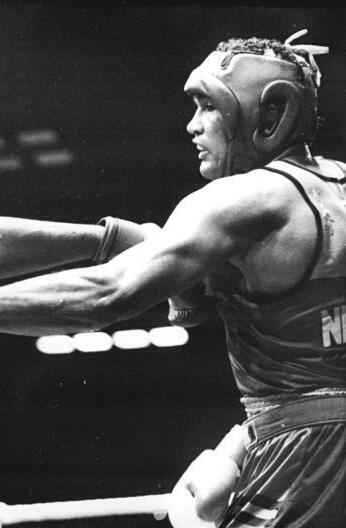
- Vanderlyde in 1990

Personal information
- Born: Arnold Petrus Maria Vanderlyde; 24 January 1963 (age 63) Sittard, Limburg, Netherlands
- Height: 1.98 m (6 ft 6 in)
- Weight: Heavyweight

Boxing career
- Stance: Southpaw

Boxing record
- Total fights: 254
- Wins: 233
- Losses: 20
- Draws: 1
Medal record
Men's Boxing
Representing the Netherlands
Olympic Games
Bronze medal – third place	1984 Los Angeles	Heavyweight
Bronze medal – third place	1988 Seoul	Heavyweight
Bronze medal – third place	1992 Barcelona	Heavyweight
World Amateur Championships
Silver medal – second place	1986 Reno	Heavyweight
Silver medal – second place	1991 Sydney	Heavyweight
European Amateur Championships
Gold medal – first place	1987 Turin	Heavyweight
Gold medal – first place	1989 Athens	Heavyweight
Gold medal – first place	1991 Gothenburg	Heavyweight
Bronze medal – third place	1985 Budapest	Heavyweight

Arnold Petrus Maria Vanderlyde (born 24 January 1963) is a Dutch former amateur boxer, who participated in three Summer Olympics (1984, 1988 and 1992) and won three bronze medals in the heavyweight division (≤91 kg). He started boxing at age fifteen. Although Vanderlyde was a three-time European champion and seven-time Dutch champion, he never turned professional. After ending his boxing career in 1992, he entered the corporate world as a motivational speaker.

== Olympic results ==
1984 Los Angeles

- 1st round bye
- Defeated Egerton Forster (Sierra Leone) 4-1
- Defeated Georgios Stefanopoulos (Greece) 5-0
- Lost to Willie DeWitt (Canada) 2-3

1988 Seoul

- 1st round bye
- Defeated Henry Akinwande (Great Britain) 3-2
- Defeated Gyula Alvics (Hungary) 5-0
- Lost to Ray Mercer (United States) RSC 2

1992 Barcelona

- Defeated Emilio Leti (American Samoa) 14-0
- Defeated Sung-Bae Chae (South Korea) 14-13
- Defeated Paul Douglas (Ireland) RSC 1 (1:30)
- Lost to Félix Savón (Cuba) 3-23

Awards
Preceded by Erik Breukink	Dutch Sportsman of the Year; 1991	Succeeded by Bart Veldkamp
