= Vladimer Chanturia =

Georgian boxer

Medal record

Men's boxing

Representing Georgia

Olympic Games
Bronze medal – third place	2000 Sydney	Heavyweight

Vladimer Chanturia (Georgian: ვლადიმერ ჭანტურია; born July 1, 1978) is a Georgian boxer who competed in the Heavyweight (91 kg) division at the 2000 Summer Olympics and won the bronze medal.

== Amateur highlights ==
- 1996 competed at the 1996 Junior World Championships in Havana, Cuba as a Light Heavyweight. Result was:
  - Lost to Khodor Zaher RSC-3
- 2000 won the bronze medal at the 2000 Olympics in Sydney as a Heavyweight. Results were:
  - Defeated Mustafa Mahmoud Amrou (Egypt) RSCI-4
  - Defeated Ruslan Chagaev (Uzbekistan) PTS (18-12)
  - Lost to Sultan Ibragimov (Russia) PTS (4-19)

== Pro career ==
Chanturia turned pro in 2006 and won his first nine bouts against countrymen but showed only limited power.

== Mixed Martial Arts ==
Chanturia was defeated by Alistair Overeem in Fighting Network Rings, his only MMA bout.
