= Lennox Lewis vs. Željko Mavrović =

Boxing match

Battle of the Giants
- Date: 26 September 1998
- Venue: Mohegan Sun, Uncasville, Connecticut, U.S.
- Title(s) on the line: WBC heavyweight title

Tale of the tape
Boxer	Lennox Lewis]	Željko Mavrović
Nickname	The Lion	Šaka sa Srednjaka ("The Fist from Srednjaci")
Hometown	London, England	Zagreb, Croatia
Pre-fight record	33–1 (27 KO)	27–0 (22 KO)
Age	33 years	29 years, 7 months
Height	6 ft 5 in (196 cm)	6 ft 3 in (191 cm)
Weight	243 lb (110 kg)	214 lb (97 kg)
Style	Orthodox	Orthodox
Recognition	WBC; Heavyweight Champion	WBC; No. 1 Ranked Heavyweight

Result
- Lewis wins via 12-round unanimous decision (119–109, 117–112, 117–111)

Lennox Lewis vs. Željko Mavrović, billed as Battle of the Giants, was a professional boxing match contested on September 26, 1998 for the WBC and Lineal Heavyweight Championships.

== Background ==
Since recapturing the WBC Heavyweight title in 1997, Lennox Lewis had made three successful defenses. After picking up a disqualification victory over Henry Akinwande due to Akinwande's excessive holding, Lewis impressively defeated his next two opponents, needing only 95 seconds to defeat Andrew Golota by first round knockout, and then, after a slow start, rebounded to defeat Shannon Briggs, knocking him down three times en route to a victory by fifth round technical knockout which added the Lineal Heavyweight title to Lewis' resume. Though Lewis had hoped for a unification match with WBA and IBF Heavyweight champion Evander Holyfield, Holyfield still had to make a mandatory defense of his titles against Henry Akinwande, who then pulled out of the fight due to illness and was replaced by Vaughn Bean. As a result, Lewis instead agreed to match with the WBC's number one contender, the undefeated Croatian fighter Željko Mavrović. Despite Mavrović's impressive record, Lewis' trainer Emmanuel Steward was critical of the fighter, stating "He has one of the least impressive records I've seen, there's no important names on it."

== The fight ==
Though Lewis was able to control most of the fight, he was unable to score a knockdown over Mavrović. Lewis was able to land several power punches through the fight, but the punches had seemingly little effect on Mavrović who stood his ground and let Lewis tire himself out by throwing a large amount of punches. However, Mavrović did not generate nearly as much offense as Lewis did, throwing 298 punches, over 200 fewer than Lewis' 507 punches thrown. Ultimately, Lewis was able to pick up the victory by unanimous decision with lopsided scores of 119–109, 117–112, and 117–111. HBO's Harold Lederman had the bout scored 118-110 for Lewis, while the AP scored it 117-111.

== Aftermath ==
Lewis' victory over Mavrović coupled with Holyfield's win over Vaughn Bean a week before lead to speculation that the long awaited unification bout between the two would be next. A month after their respective victories, a deal was in place that would see the fight happen early in 1999, but Lewis was reluctant to sign the contract and it was not until November 24 that the match was officially agreed to.

== Undercard ==
Confirmed bouts:

== Broadcasting ==
Country	Broadcaster
United Kingdom	Sky Sports
United States	HBO

Preceded by vs. Shannon Briggs	Lennox Lewis's bouts 26 September 1998	Succeeded by vs. Evander Holyfield
Preceded by vs. Vincenzo Cantatore	Željko Mavrović's bouts 26 September 1998	Retired
