= John Pettersson =

John Pettersson may refer to:

- John Pettersson (boxer)
- John Pettersson (football manager)

== See also ==
- John Petersson, Danish swimmer and president of the European Paralympic Committee
