= Juan Antonio Díaz =

Argentine boxer

Personal information
- Born: 5 July 1961 (age 64) Comodoro Rivadavia, Argentina

Sport
- Sport: Boxing
Medal record
Men's amateur boxing
Representing Argentina
World Cup
Bronze medal – third place	1985 Seoul	Super heavyweight
Pan American Games
Silver medal – second place	1987 Indianapolis	Heavyweight

Juan Antonio Díaz (born 5 July 1961) is an Argentine boxer. He competed in the men's heavyweight event at the 1988 Summer Olympics. At the 1988 Summer Olympics, he lost to Maik Heydeck of East Germany.
