= Kirk Johnson =

Canadian boxer (born 1972)

Personal information
- Nickname: Bubba
- Nationality: (Canada) Canadian
- Born: Kirk Cyron Johnson; June 20, 1972 (age 54) North Preston, Nova Scotia, Canada
- Height: 6 ft 2 in (188 cm)
- Weight: Heavyweight

Boxing career
- Reach: 81 in (206 cm)

Boxing record
- Total fights: 41
- Wins: 37
- Win by KO: 27
- Losses: 2
- Draws: 1
- No contests: 1
Medal record
Men's amateur boxing
Representing Canada
Junior World Championships
| Gold medal – first place | 1989 Bayamon | Heavyweight |

Kirk Cyron Johnson (born June 20, 1972) is a Canadian former professional boxer who competed from 1993 to 2010, and challenged once for the WBA heavyweight title in 2002.

== Early life ==
Kirk Cyron Johnson was born in North Preston, Nova Scotia, Canada, on June 29, 1972.

== Amateur career ==
Kirk Johnson started boxing at eleven years old. Throughout his early amateur bouts, his trainer was his father, Gary Johnson Sr.

He became the world's best junior heavyweight in August 1989 at just 17 years old. He made history as the first Nova Scotian and second Canadian to claim gold at the Junior World Championships.

At the Canadian intermediate amateur boxing championships in December 1989, Johnson captured the title in the heavyweight (91-kilogram) division.

At 18, Johnson defended his junior world title at the October 1990 Junior World Championships in Lima, Peru, where he lost in the final to a Soviet opponent. Moving into the senior ranks that year, he secured the Canadian senior national title. In September 1991, he won another title at the Canadian senior national boxing championships in Saskatoon. As part of Canada's national boxing team, he competed in the 1991 World Amateur Boxing Championships held in Sydney, Australia.

Johnson, while still a young prospect and Olympic team member, spent time at a camp of legendary trainer and manager Lou Duva, and worked with him on and off.

He represented Canada at the 1992 Olympics in Barcelona, where he lost in the quarter-finals against eventual silver medallist David Izon of Nigeria.

=== Highlights ===
(gold) Junior World Championships, Bayamon, Puerto Rico, August 1989:

- 1/4: Defeated Pencho Dzhurov (Bulgaria) KO 1
- 1/2: Defeated Bobby Harris (United States) RSCH 1
- Finals: Defeated Dmitriy Avdalyan (Soviet Union) on points, 24–11

(bronze) Trofeo Italia, Mestre, Venice, Italy, March 1991:

- 1/4: Defeated Peter Hart (Hungary) RET 1
- 1/2: Lost to Peter Stettinger (Germany) by unanimous decision, 0–5

World Championships, Sydney, Australia, November 1991:

- 1/4: Lost to Félix Savón (Cuba) RET 2

(silver) Box-Am Tournament, Badalona, Spain, February 1992:

- 1/4: Defeated Georgios Stefanopoulos (Greece) on points, 12–7
- 1/2: Defeated Sandor Deak (Hungary) RET 2
- Finals: Lost to Félix Savón (Cuba) on points, 5–14

North & Central American Olympic Qualifications, Santo Domingo, Dominican Republic, April 1992:

- 1/2: Defeated Aridio Fana (Dominican Republic) on points, 18–2
- Finals: Defeated Jose Aníbal Marrero (Puerto Rico) on points, 28–4

Summer Olympics, Barcelona, Spain, July–August 1992:

- 1/8: Defeated Joseph Akhasamba (Kenya) RSC 2
- 1/4: Lost to David Izonritei (Nigeria) on points, 5–9

His amateur record was 76 wins and 7 losses.

== Professional career ==
The Olympic quarterfinalist had his first professional bout on April 24, 1993, against Andre Smiley in Las Vegas. He won by TKO in the third round. Early in his professional development, Johnson trained in Fort Worth, Texas, with ex-world champions Curtis Cokes and Donald Curry, while being co-managed by Ken Lilien and Chris Seeger.

He fought Tyrone Evans on the Michael Moorer vs. George Foreman card on November 5, 1994, in Las Vegas.

By the late 1990s, he was managed by boxing promoter and manager Cedric Kushner. He began training under George Benton around 1997. Johnson, then an undefeated prospect, fought Al Cole to a ten-round draw in December 1998. Three months after their first meeting, Kirk Johnson, with Teddy Atlas in his corner, outpointed Al Cole by unanimous decision in March 1999. When Johnson and Atlas parted ways, he reconnected with Curtis Cokes, a Hall of Famer and former welterweight champion who had guided him early on.

On October 7, 2000, Kirk Johnson stopped Oleg Maskaev, who later became WBC heavyweight champion, with a fourth-round knockout. He captured the PABA Heavyweight Title.

After defeating Larry Donald on July 7, 2001, Kirk Johnson rose to 32-0-1 and became the WBA's no. 1 contender and the mandatory title challenger.

His contract with Kushner had expired. He joined Dino Duva's promotion, Duva Boxing, in April 2002, signing a $1.1 million deal after Duva outbid numerous promoters.

In his first title fight in 2002, Johnson faced John Ruiz for the WBA Heavyweight Title. In the tenth round, Johnson was disqualified for low blows while trailing on all of the judges' scorecards. It marked his first defeat in his professional career. He appealed the disqualification to the WBA, on the grounds that referee Joe Cortez had erred in calling some of the low blows and did not act impartially (both Ruiz and Cortez are of Puerto Rican descent). Though many boxing commentators agreed that the disqualification was unwarranted, the appeal was ultimately denied by the WBA.

He resurrected his career on March 15, 2003, scoring a fourth-round knockout over Lou Savarese in Dallas, Texas. The win secured him the WBO Inter-Continental Heavyweight Title. Johnson, then ranked eighth in the world, was set to meet champion Lennox Lewis on June 21, 2003, at the Staples Centre, but the fight between the Canadian Olympians never happened. Johnson withdrew from the fight on June 6, 2003, after tearing a chest muscle while sparring in his Fort Worth training camp.

On December 6, 2003, Johnson faced the Ukrainian contender and future champion Vitali Klitschko in New York's Madison Square Garden. He was easily defeated by Klitschko, losing by a second-round knockout. He stepped into the ring at a career-high 260 pounds.

=== Comeback ===
After the Klitschko fight, he staged a comeback. He knocked out Mexican heavyweight Gilbert Martinez in July 2004 and won a technical decision over Cuban Yanqui Díaz in June 2005. He lost his next bout (later changed to a technical decision) against Californian Javier Mora on March 3, 2006. During the seventh round, Mora appeared to have accidentally stepped on Johnson's foot, causing Johnson to dislocate his right knee. This decision was subsequently appealed, and the result changed to a no decision.

On April 29, 2010, Johnson returned to the ring after a four-year absence and fought journeyman Douglas Robertson, defeating him via first-round TKO.

Johnson finished his career with a record of 37–2–1 (27 KOs), with one no contest.

== Halifax Regional Police lawsuit ==
In 2003, after dropping out of a planned fight against then-heavyweight champion Lennox Lewis because of an injury, Johnson launched a protracted legal battle against the Halifax Regional Police. During the inquiry, Johnson claimed that because of racism and racial profiling by the Halifax Regional Police, he had his car stopped 28 times over five years while in Halifax. Johnson was awarded $10,000 in damages, in addition to $4,790 to cover his travel expenses. The police service was also ordered to create a scholarship in Johnson's name. It is awarded annually to a student from North Preston. Since 2003, 16 students have received awards.

== Professional boxing record ==
| 41 fights | 37 wins | 2 losses |
|---|---|---|
| By knockout | 27 | 1 |
| By decision | 10 | 0 |
| By disqualification | 0 | 1 |
| Draws | 1 | |
| No contests | 1 | |

| No. | Result | Record | Opponent | Type | Round, time | Date | Location | Notes |
|---|---|---|---|---|---|---|---|---|
| 41 | Win | 37–2–1 (1) | (United States) Douglas Robertson | TKO | 1 (4), 1:45 | Apr 29, 2010 | (United States) Motor Speedway, Fort Worth, Texas, U.S. | |
| 40 | NC | 36–2–1 (1) | (Mexico) Javier Mora | TKO | 7 (10), 1:53 | Mar 3, 2006 | (United States) Pechanga Resort & Casino, Temecula, California, U.S. | Originally a TKO win for Mora, later ruled an NC after an incorrect referee call |
| 39 | Win | 36–2–1 | (Cuba) Yanqui Díaz | TD | 5 (10), 3:00 | Jun 9, 2005 | (United States) Pechanga Resort & Casino, Temecula, California, U.S. | Unanimous TD after Díaz was cut from an accidental head clash |
| 38 | Win | 35–2–1 | (Mexico) Gilbert Martinez | RTD | 8 (10), 3:00 | Jul 8, 2004 | (United States) Pechanga Resort & Casino, Temecula, California, U.S. | |
| 37 | Loss | 34–2–1 | (Ukraine) Vitali Klitschko | TKO | 2 (12), 2:54 | Dec 6, 2003 | (United States) Madison Square Garden, New York City, New York, U.S. | |
| 36 | Win | 34–1–1 | (United States) Lou Savarese | TKO | 4 (12), 1:52 | Mar 15, 2003 | (United States) Club Life, Dallas, Texas, U.S. | Won WBO Inter-Continental heavyweight title |
| 35 | Win | 33–1–1 | (United States) Jeremy Bates | KO | 2 (8), 2:59 | Dec 7, 2002 | (United States) Mandalay Bay Events Center, Paradise, Nevada, U.S. | |
| 34 | Loss | 32–1–1 | (United States) John Ruiz | DQ | 10 (12), 2:17 | Jul 27, 2002 | (United States) Mandalay Bay Events Center, Paradise, Nevada, U.S. | For WBA heavyweight title; Johnson disqualified for repeated low blows |
| 33 | Win | 32–0–1 | (United States) Larry Donald | UD | 12 | Jul 7, 2001 | (United States) KeySpan Park, New York City, New York, U.S. | |
| 32 | Win | 31–0–1 | (United States) Derrick Banks | KO | 1 (10), 1:32 | Apr 28, 2001 | (United States) Civic Auditorium, LaPorte, Indiana, U.S. | |
| 31 | Win | 30–0–1 | (Uzbekistan) Oleg Maskaev | KO | 4 (12), 0:51 | Oct 7, 2000 | (United States) Mohegan Sun Arena, Montville, Connecticut, U.S. | Won PABA heavyweight title |
| 30 | Win | 29–0–1 | (United States) Marcus Johnson | TKO | 2 (10), 2:00 | Jan 27, 2000 | (United States) Hammerstein Ballroom, New York City, New York, U.S. | |
| 29 | Win | 28–0–1 | (Puerto Rico) Rodolfo Marin | KO | 1 (10), 2:05 | Oct 7, 1999 | (United States) Soaring Eagle Casino, Mount Pleasant, Michigan, U.S. | |
| 28 | Win | 27–0–1 | (United States) Al Cole | UD | 10 | Mar 20, 1999 | (United States) Emerald Queen Casino, Tacoma, Washington, U.S. | |
| 27 | Draw | 26–0–1 | (United States) Al Cole | MD | 10 | Dec 8, 1998 | (United States) Roseland Ballroom, New York City, New York, U.S. | |
| 26 | Win | 26–0 | (United States) Levi Billups | UD | 10 | Aug 6, 1998 | (United States) Coeur d'Alene Casino, Worley, Idaho, U.S. | |
| 25 | Win | 25–0 | (United States) Eric Curry | TKO | 1 (10), 1:37 | May 9, 1998 | (United States) Etess Arena, Atlantic City, New Jersey, U.S. | |
| 24 | Win | 24–0 | (United States) Rocky Pepeli | TKO | 1 (10) | Apr 2, 1998 | (United States) Erie Community College, Williamsville, New York, U.S. | |
| 23 | Win | 23–0 | (United States) Louis Monaco | TKO | 7 (10), 2:58 | Jul 12, 1997 | (United States) Grand Casino, Biloxi, Mississippi, U.S. | |
| 22 | Win | 22–0 | (Jamaica) Everton Davis | KO | 8 (10), 2:16 | Mar 11, 1997 | (United States) Casino Magic, Bay St. Louis, Mississippi, U.S. | |
| 21 | Win | 21–0 | (United States) Terry McGroom | TKO | 8 (10), 3:00 | Nov 16, 1996 | (United States) Bally's Park Place, Atlantic City, New Jersey, U.S. | |
| 20 | Win | 20–0 | (United States) Danell Nicholson | UD | 10 | Aug 23, 1996 | (United States) Bally's Park Place, Atlantic City, New Jersey, U.S. | |
| 19 | Win | 19–0 | (United States) Darren Hayden | TKO | 1 (10), 1:44 | Jun 12, 1996 | (United States) Trump World's Fair, Atlantic City, New Jersey, U.S. | |
| 18 | Win | 18–0 | (United States) Mike Dixon | TKO | 1 (8) | Mar 7, 1996 | Edmonton Convention Centre, Edmonton, Alberta, Canada | |
| 17 | Win | 17–0 | (United States) Art Bayliss | TKO | 1 (8), 1:39 | Jan 25, 1996 | International Plaza Hotel, Toronto, Ontario, Canada | |
| 16 | Win | 16–0 | (United States) Bradley Rone | PTS | 8 | Dec 21, 1995 | (United States) Isle of Capri Casino, Bossier City, Louisiana, U.S. | |
| 15 | Win | 15–0 | (United States) Nathaniel Fitch | UD | 8 | Jul 7, 1995 | (United States) Civic Center, Bossier City, Louisiana, U.S. | |
| 14 | Win | 14–0 | (United States) Matt Green | KO | 1 (8), 1:18 | May 3, 1995 | (United States) 69th Regiment Armory, New York City, New York, U.S. | |
| 13 | Win | 13–0 | (United States) Ron Gullette | KO | 1 (8) | Mar 29, 1995 | (United States) 69th Regiment Armory, New York City, New York, U.S. | |
| 12 | Win | 12–0 | (United States) Marion Wilson | UD | 8 | Feb 3, 1995 | (United States) Fernwood Resort, Bushkill, Pennsylvania, U.S. | |
| 11 | Win | 11–0 | (United States) Tyrone Evans | KO | 8 (8), 1:43 | Nov 5, 1994 | (United States) MGM Grand Garden Arena, Paradise, Nevada, U.S. | |
| 10 | Win | 10–0 | (United States) Keith McMurray | KO | 3 (10) | Oct 12, 1994 | (United States) The Pit, Albuquerque, New Mexico, U.S. | |
| 9 | Win | 9–0 | (United States) George O'Mara | KO | 1 (8) | Sep 9, 1994 | (United States) Grand Olympic Auditorium, Los Angeles, California, U.S. | |
| 8 | Win | 8–0 | (United States) Ross Puritty | UD | 6 | May 5, 1994 | (United States) Grand Olympic Auditorium, Los Angeles, California, U.S. | |
| 7 | Win | 7–0 | (Canada) Dave Fiddler | TKO | 2 (6) | Feb 17, 1994 | Edmonton Convention Centre, Edmonton, Alberta, Canada | |
| 6 | Win | 6–0 | (United States) Kelvin Hayden | KO | 1 (6), 2:07 | Dec 16, 1993 | (United States) Foxwoods Resort Casino, Ledyard, Connecticut, U.S. | |
| 5 | Win | 5–0 | (United States) Willie Johnson | KO | 3 (6) | Oct 27, 1993 | (United States) Bally's Park Place, Atlantic City, New Jersey, U.S. | |
| 4 | Win | 4–0 | (United States) Bryant Smith | UD | 6 | Oct 6, 1993 | (United States) Broadway by the Bay Theater, Atlantic City, New Jersey, U.S. | |
| 3 | Win | 3–0 | (United States) Ed Donaldson | KO | 5 (6) | Aug 30, 1993 | (United States) Kemper Arena, Kansas City, Missouri, U.S. | |
| 2 | Win | 2–0 | (United States) Earl Talley | KO | 1 (4), 2:05 | Jun 7, 1993 | (United States) Thomas & Mack Center, Paradise, Nevada, U.S. | |
| 1 | Win | 1–0 | (United States) Andre Smiley | TKO | 3 (4), 2:47 | Apr 4, 1993 | (United States) The Aladdin, Paradise, Nevada, U.S. | |

== Awards and recognitions ==
- 1989 Viscount Alexander Award (for Outstanding Junior Male Athlete of the Year)
- 1990 Harry Jerome Award (for Outstanding Athletic Performance)
- 1990 Nova Scotia Male Athlete of the Year
- 2024 Nova Scotia Sport Hall of Fame

Sporting positions
Regional boxing titles
| Preceded by Oleg Maskaev | PABA heavyweight champion October 7, 2000 – June 2001; Vacated | Vacant Title next held by Nikolai Valuev |
| Preceded by Lou Savarese | WBO Inter-Continental heavyweight champion March 15, 2003 – November 2003; Vacated | Vacant Title next held by Timo Hoffmann |
