= Sebastian Köber =

German boxer (born 1979)

Personal information
- Full name: Sebastian Köber
- Nationality: Germany
- Born: 28 May 1979 (age 47) Frankfurt an der Oder, East Germany
- Height: 1.92 m (6 ft 4 in)
- Weight: 102 kg (225 lb)

Sport
- Sport: Boxing
- Weight class: Super Heavyweight
- Club: Boxing Club Frankfurt am Oder
Medal record
Olympic Games
Bronze medal – third place	2000 Sydney	Heavyweight
European Amateur Championships
Bronze medal – third place	2002 Perm	Super Heavyweight
World Amateur Championships
Bronze medal – third place	2003 Bangkok	Super Heavyweight

Sebastian Köber (born 28 May 1979) is a German boxer, who won the Heavyweight bronze medal at the 2000 Summer Olympics in Sydney, Australia. Three years later, at the 2003 World Amateur Boxing Championships in Bangkok, he once again finished in third place.

== Amateur ==
- German Super Heavyweight Champion 2003, German Junior Champion 1996, 1997

=== Heavyweight 201 lb/91 kg limit ===
- 1997 won the European Junior Championships at Heavyweight in Birmingham (England), beating Aleksander Jacenko (Ukraine) in the final.
- 2000 competed at the European Championships in Tampere, Finland. Result was:
  - Lost to Jackson Chanet (France) PTS
- 2000 won a bronze medal in the Sydney Olympics at Heavyweight, representing Germany. Results were:
  - Defeated Magomed Aripgadjiev (Azerbaijan) PTS (9–4)
  - Defeated Mark Simmons (Canada) RSC-3
  - Lost to Félix Savón (Cuba) PTS (8–19)
- 2001 competed at the World Championships in Belfast, Northern Ireland at Heavyweight. Lost the quarterfinal to David Haye on points.

=== Superheavyweight ===
- 2002 won a bronze medal at the European Championships at Superheavyweight in Perm, Russia. Results were:
  - Defeated Chaba Kurtuts (Hungary) PTS (32–11)
  - Lost to Alexander Povetkin (Russia) RSC-4
- 2002 won the Military Championship in Curragh (Ireland), beating Roberto Cammarelle (Italy) in the final 16–7
- 2003 2nd place at the European Union Championships in Strasbourg (France), lost to Modo Sallah (Sweden) by Walkover
- 2003 won a bronze medal at the World Championships in Bangkok, Thailand. Results were:
  - Defeated Mukhtarkhan Dildabekov (Kazakhstan) PTS (20–19)
  - Defeated Jaroslav Jaksto (Lithuania) PTS (27–15)
  - Lost to Pedro Carrion (Cuba) PTS (18–26)
- 2004 competed at the European Championships in Pula, Croatia. Result was:
  - Lost to Roberto Cammarelle (Italy) RSC
- 2004 Köber qualified for the 2004 Summer Olympics by ending up in first place at the 1st AIBA European 2004 Olympic Qualifying Tournament in Plovdiv, Bulgaria.
- 2004 competed in the Athens Olympics. Result was:
  - Lost to Mukhtarkhan Dildabekov (Kazakhstan) PTS (18–28)
- 2005 won the Military World Championships in Pretoria, South Africa. Results were:
  - Defeated Magomed Abdusalamov (Russia) PTS (16–15)
  - Defeated Martin Tcho (Cameroon) PTS (27–2)
  - Defeated Jaroslav Jaksto (Lithuania) PTS (14–9)
  - Defeated Jack Saye Sr. (USA) PTS (12–5)

== Pro ==
Köber turned pro in 2006, and won his first nineteen fights against unknowns before losing two decisions to extremely limited opponents, one with a losing record.
