= Obunga =

Obunga is a surname. Notable people with the surname include:

- Harold Obunga (1959–1995), Kenyan boxer
- Jacob Obunga (born 1994), Kenyan musician known professionally as Otile Brown

== See also ==
- Otunga (surname)
