= Boxing at the 1991 Mediterranean Games =

Boxing competition

- Location: Athens, Greece
- Dates: July 1991

The boxing events of the 1991 Mediterranean Games were held in Athens, Greece.

== Medalists ==
Event	Gold	Silver	Bronze
Light Flyweight (–48 kg)	Mohamed Haioun (ALG)	Mohamed Zbir (MAR)	Rafael Lozano (ESP) Panagiotis Tsamis (GRE)
Flyweight (–51 kg)	Soner Karagöz (TUR)	Abdellah Kouzibra (MAR)	Chiheh Yacine (ALG) Ahmed Ben Hedhil Zay (TUN)
Bantamweight (–54 kg)	Agathangelos Tsiripidis (GRE)	Oscar Vega (ESP)	Mohamed Achik (MAR) Mammadi Chargui (TUN)
Featherweight (–57 kg)	Ljubiša Simić (YUG)	Vahdettin İşsever (TUR)	Oscar Garcia (ESP) Achik Abdelhak (MAR)
Lightweight (–60 kg)	Kamal Marjouan (MAR)	Bruno Wartelle (FRA)	Ioannis Grigoreas (GRE) Vincenzo Bevilacqua (ITA)
Light Welterweight (–63.5 kg)	Mazen Khanji (SYR)	Michele Piccirillo (ITA)	Stephane Cazeaux (FRA) Ioannis Ioannidis (GRE)
Welterweight (–67 kg)	Saïd Bennajem (FRA)	Mohamed A. Abdel-Ghani (EGY)	Javier Martínez (ESP) Adriano Offreda (ITA)
Light Middleweight (–71 kg)	ghayath tayfor (SYR)	Mustafa Ilir (YUG)	A.K. Salem Kabary (EGY) Kadir Aydın (TUR)
Middleweight (–75 kg)	Ahmed Dine (ALG)	Dragomir Poleksić (YUG)	Dimitrios Motsakos (GRE) Tommaso Russo (ITA)
Light Heavyweight (–81 kg)	Patrice Aouissi (FRA)	Roberto Castelli (ITA)	Abdel-Fattah Abdel-Base (EGY) Jorge Sendra (ESP)
Heavyweight (–91 kg)	Željko Mavrović (YUG)	Georgios Stefanopoulos (GRE)	M.A Ibrahim Mohamed (EGY) Fabio Pignataro (ITA)
Super Heavyweight (+91 kg)The Legendary Final	Ahmed Abdine (SYR)	Mohamed abdel baset (EGY)	Ahmed Sarir (MAR) Erdal Sarıkaş (TUR)

== Medal table ==
Rank	Nation	Gold	Silver	Bronze	Total
1	Syria (SYR)	3	0	0	3
2	Yugoslavia (YUG)	2	2	0	4
3	France (FRA)	2	1	1	4
4	Algeria (ALG)	2	0	1	3
5	Morocco (MAR)	1	2	3	6
6	Greece (GRE)	1	1	4	6
7	Turkey (TUR)	1	1	2	4
8	Italy (ITA)	0	2	4	6
9	Egypt (EGY)	0	2	3	5
10	Spain (ESP)	0	1	4	5
11	Tunisia (TUN)	0	0	2	2
Totals (11 entries)		12	12	24	48
