= Steffen Kretschmann =

German boxer

Personal information
- Nationality: German
- Born: Steffen Kretschmann; 8 June 1980 (age 46) Köthen, East Germany
- Height: 6 ft 5 in (1.96 m)
- Weight: Heavyweight

Boxing career
- Stance: Southpaw

Boxing record
- Total fights: 22
- Wins: 19
- Win by KO: 17
- Losses: 2
- Draws: 0
- No contests: 1
Medal record
Men's boxing
Representing Germany
World Amateur Championships
Bronze medal – third place	1999 Houston	Heavyweight
Bronze medal – third place	2003 Bangkok	Heavyweight

Steffen Kretschmann (born 8 June 1980 in Köthen) is a German boxer best known for winning the bronze medal 1999 and 2003 at the amateur world championships in the 201 lbs/91 kg division.

== Amateur ==
The southpaw won bronze 1999 in Houston when he had to quit with an injury in his fight against eventual winner Michael Bennett

In Bangkok 2003 he lost to Aleksandr Alekseyev and won bronze again.

=== Amateur highlights ===
- Record: 144 fights - 122 wins
- 1999, 2001, 2002 German heavyweight champion
- 1996 won the European Cadet (under-17) championships in Aosta, Italy, as a light heavyweight.
- 1997 2nd place at Junior European Championship in Birmingham (England), lost the final to Vyacheslav Uzelkov (Ukraine)
- 1998 competed at the Junior World Championships in Buenos Aires, Argentina, as a heavyweight. Results were:
  - Defeated Roberto Cammarelle (Italy) PTS (12–4)
  - Lost to Odlanier Solis (Cuba) PTS (1–8)
- 1999 3rd place at the World Championship in Houston, lost in the semifinal to Michael Bennett (USA) by AB-2
- 2003 3rd place at the World Championship in Bangkok, Thailand. Results were:
  - Defeated Sergey Mihaylov (Uzbekistan) PTS (35–30)
  - Lost to Aleksandr Alekseyev (Russia) RSCO-3
- 2004 2nd place at Military World Championship in Fort Huachuca (USA) as a superheavyweight, lost the final to Roberto Cammarelle (Italy) by walkover

== Pro ==
He turned pro for Arena and beat his first 13 opponents, among them Corey Sanders. Then he was surprised by Denis Bakhtov (KO by 1).
