= W.A.K.O. European Championships 1986 =

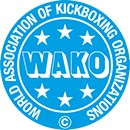
- The poster for W.A.K.O. European Championships 1986
- Promotion: W.A.K.O.
- Date: November 29 (Start); November 30, 1986 (End)
- City: Athens, Greece

Event chronology
W.A.K.O. World Championships 1985 Budapest	W.A.K.O. European Championships 1986	W.A.K.O. World Championships 1987

W.A.K.O. European Championships 1986 were the eighth European kickboxing championships hosted by the W.A.K.O. organization arranged by Simon Zahopoulos. The championships were open to amateur men and women based in Europe with each country only allowed one competitor per weight division. The styles on offer were Full-Contact (men only) and Semi-Contact kickboxing. West Germany were easily the strongest nation overall by the end of the championships, with hosts Greece in second and Great Britain third in the medals table. The event was held in Athens, Greece on Saturday, November 29 to Sunday, November 30, 1986.

== Men's Full-Contact Kickboxing ==
In the men's Full-Contact category at Athens there were ten weight classes ranging from 54 kg/118.8 lbs to over 91 kg/+200.2 lbs, with all of the bouts fought under Full-Contact rules - more detail on Full-Contact rules can be found on the W.A.K.O. website, although they may have changed slightly since 1986. Notable winners included the ever-present Ferdinand Mack who won his seventh gold at a W.A.K.O. championships (European and World), Michael Kuhr who won his third gold and local fighter Georgios Stefanopoulos who would also go on to have a successful amateur boxing career. West Germany was the most successful nation in Full-Contact, winning four golds, one silver and one bronze.

=== Men's Full-Contact Kickboxing Medals Table ===
Event	Gold	Silver	Bronze
-54 kg	Darren Evans (United Kingdom)	Gabriel Damm (West Germany)	No Bronze medallists recorded
-57 kg	Rudolf Kainer (West Germany)	Paul Monty (United Kingdom)	No Bronze medallists recorded
-60 kg	Michael Kuhr (West Germany)	Bogdan Jakubiak (Poland)	No Bronze medallists recorded
-63.5 kg	George Kotsis (Greece)	Joannis Zachos (Cyprus)	No Bronze medallists recorded
-67 kg	Mario Dimitroff (West Germany)	Chris McNeesh (United Kingdom)	No Bronze medallists recorded
-71 kg	Martin Manderville (United Kingdom)	Kostas Gogos (Greece)	Angelo Ciarafoni (Italy); Joachim Mainka (West Germany)
-75 kg	Ferdinand Mack (West Germany)	Mick McCue (United Kingdom)	Mario Pisk (Italy); N. Papatheas (Greece)
-80 kg	Keith Wilson (Scotland)	Peter Lowrie (United Kingdom)	Raffaello Molino (Italy); Rudolf Dusan (Socialist Federal Republic of Yugoslavia)
-91 kg	Georgios Stefanopoulos (Greece)	Miljenco Sarac (Socialist Federal Republic of Yugoslavia)	Franco Mondolo (Italy)
+91 kg	Mladen Carevic (Socialist Federal Republic of Yugoslavia)	No Silver medallist recorded	No Bronze medallists recorded

== Semi-Contact Kickboxing ==
Semi-Contact differed from Full-Contact in that fighters were won by points given due to technique, skill and speed, with physical force limited - more information on Semi-Contact can be found on the W.A.K.O. website, although the rules will have changed since 1986. There were fewer weight divisions in men's Semi-Contact when compared to Full-Contact with seven ranging from 57 kg/125.4 lbs to over 84 kg/+184.8 lbs. As with Full-Contact the top nation in men's Semi-Contact was West Germany who won four golds and two silver medals.

Women's kickboxing had been introduced at the London and Budapest world championships of 1985, but Athens was the first European championships to host women's Semi-Contact. There were four women's weight divisions ranging from 50 kg/110 lbs to over 60 kg/132 lbs). By the end of the championships West Germany was the strongest nation in women's Semi-Contact as well, winning two golds, one silver and one bronze medal.

=== Men's Semi-Contact Kickboxing Medals Table ===
Event	Gold	Silver	Bronze
-57 kg	Piotr Siegoczynski (Poland)	Jurgen Jakob (West Germany)	No Bronze medallists recorded
-63 kg	Walter Lange (West Germany)	Bogdan Rudkowski (Poland)	Nikos Memos (Greece); Carlton Abbey (United Kingdom)
-69 kg	Reiner Walter (West Germany)	Spiros Velios (Greece)	Artur Piekarz (Poland); Evelyn Dwyer (United Kingdom)
-74 kg	Ralf Kunzler (West Germany)	Carl Reynolds (Scotland)	Vassilios Kapatais (Cyprus); George McKenzie (United Kingdom)
-79 kg	Steve French (United Kingdom)	Andreas Lindemann (West Germany)	Basilio Basile (Italy); Irenevsz Jakubiak (Poland)
-84 kg	Alfie Lewis (United Kingdom)	D. Muratithis (Greece)	Peter Opasca (Scotland); M. Markesina (Socialist Federal Republic of Yugoslavia)
+84 kg	Peter Hainke (West Germany)	Andrew Boyce (United Kingdom)	M. Zapior (Poland)

=== Women's Semi-Contact Kickboxing Medals Table ===
Event	Gold	Silver	Bronze
-50 kg	Chris Ganzmann (West Germany)	Ewa Lysiak (Poland)	No Bronze medallist recorded
-55 kg	Gerda Mack (West Germany)	Anna Pietryka (Poland)	No Bronze medallist recorded
-60 kg	Margareta Kramm-Nianias (Greece)	Lisa Oliver (Scotland)	Ute Bernhard (West Germany); Jane Grey (United Kingdom)
+60 kg	Diane Grimmer (United Kingdom)	Dagmar Einwag (West Germany)	M. Tzeffrakov (Greece); Monik Maughan (Scotland)

== Overall Medals Standing (Top 5) ==
Ranking	Country	Gold (gold)	Silver (silver)	Bronze (bronze)
1	West Germany	10	4	2
2	Greece	3	3	3
3	(United Kingdom) Great Britain	2	5	4
4	Poland	1	4	3
5	Scotland	1	2	2

== See also ==
- List of WAKO Amateur European Championships
- List of WAKO Amateur World Championships
