= Pauga Lalau =

Samoan boxer

Personal information
- Nationality: Samoan
- Born: 5 October 1975 (age 49); Saanapu, Samoa

Sport
- Sport: Boxing

Pauga Lalau (born 5 October 1975) is a Samoan former boxer. He competed in the men's heavyweight event at the 2000 Summer Olympics.
