= Danell Nicholson =

American boxer

Personal information
- Nickname: Doc
- Born: Danell Nicholson; November 15, 1967 (age 58) Chicago, Illinois, U.S.
- Height: 6 ft 4 in (1.93 m)
- Weight: Heavyweight

Boxing career
- Reach: 80 in (203 cm)
- Stance: Orthodox

Boxing record
- Total fights: 47
- Wins: 42
- Win by KO: 32
- Losses: 5
- Draws: 0

Danell Nicholson (born November 15, 1967) is a former American Olympian and a boxer in the heavyweight division. He held the IBO World Heavyweight title in 1994, and in 2003 challenged Wladimir Klitschko for the WBA Intercontinental Heavyweight title.

== Professional career ==
=== Amateur ===
Nicholson was a member of the 1992 United States Olympic Team as a Heavyweight. His results were:

- Defeated Paul Lawson (Great Britain) 10-2
- Defeated Zeljko Mavrovic (Croatia) 9-6
- Lost to Félix Savón (Cuba) 13-11

=== Professional ===
He boxed professionally from 1992 to 2003 training under Emanuel Steward. Perhaps his best win as a professional was his split decision win over future heavyweight titlist John Ruiz on August 4, 1994. With that win came the lightly regarded International Boxing Organization heavyweight title. Other notable fighters he faced but to whom he lost were Andrew Golota, Kirk Johnson, David Tua, and Wladimir Klitschko.

==== Professional boxing record ====
42 Wins (32 knockouts, 10 decisions), 5 Losses (4 knockouts, 1 decision)
Result	Record	Opponent	Type	Round	Date	Location	Notes
Loss	41-2	Wladimir Klitschko	TKO	4	20/12/2003	Kiel, Schleswig-Holstein, Germany	WBA Intercontinental Heavyweight Title.
Win	18-10-1	Ken Murphy	TKO	2	14/06/2003	Las Vegas, Nevada, U.S.	Referee stopped the bout at 0:18 of the second round.
Win	17-5-2	Sione Asipeli	UD	6	23/03/2003	Temecula, California, U.S.	
Win	23-10-1	Melvin Foster	TKO	4	18/01/2002	Las Vegas, Nevada, U.S.	Referee stopped the bout at 2:36 of the fourth round.
Loss	37-2	David Tua	KO	6	23/03/2001	Las Vegas, Nevada, U.S.	Nicholson knocked out at 0:34 of the sixth round.
Win	16-7	Reynaldo Minus	TKO	2	04/11/2000	New York City, U.S.	
Win	6-7-2	Tim Pollard	KO	2	25/06/2000	Elgin, Illinois, U.S.	Pollard knocked out at 1:38 of the second round.
Win	26-6	Terrence Lewis	TKO	2	31/03/2000	New York City, U.S.	
Win	32-17	Tony LaRosa	TKO	2	09/02/2000	Rosemont, Illinois, U.S.	Referee stopped the bout at 2:59 of the second round.
Win	22-9-1	Marcellus Brown	TKO	2	05/08/1999	Tunica, Mississippi, U.S.	Referee stopped the bout at 3:00 of the second round.
Win	20-13	Abdul Muhaymin	UD	8	17/06/1999	Worley, Idaho, U.S.	80-72, 80-72, 80-72.
Win	34-16-1	Frankie Swindell	UD	10	12/03/1999	New York City, U.S.	98-91, 98-91, 98-91.
Win	21-19-1	Levi Billups	TKO	4	07/01/1999	Tunica, Mississippi, U.S.	Referee stopped the bout at 0:43 of the fourth round.
Win	10-8-1	Jimmy Haynes	TKO	1	22/09/1998	New York City, U.S.	Referee stopped the bout at 2:58 of the first round.
Win	31-18-2	Mike Sedillo	PTS	10	03/09/1998	Mashantucket, Connecticut, U.S.	
Win	20-23-1	Everett Martin	TKO	4	16/06/1998	Biloxi, Mississippi, U.S.	Referee stopped the bout at 3:00 of the fourth round.
Win	9-4	Everett Mayo	TKO	3	31/01/1998	Atlantic City, New Jersey, U.S.	
Win	17-5	Thomas Williams	TKO	2	30/08/1997	Buenos Aires, Argentina	
Win	1-5	Moses Harris	TKO	3	26/04/1997	Cicero, Illinois, U.S.	Referee stopped the bout at 1:45 of the third round.
Win	17-8-1	Marcos Gonzalez	KO	2	03/04/1997	Worley, Idaho, U.S.	Gonzalez knocked out at 0:52 of the second round.
Loss	19-0	Kirk Johnson	UD	10	23/08/1996	Atlantic City, New Jersey, U.S.	Referee stopped the bout at 3:00 of the second round.
Loss	27-0	Andrew Golota	TKO	8	15/03/1996	Atlantic City, New Jersey, U.S.	Referee stopped the bout at 3:00 of the eighth round.
Win	14-3-1	Darren Hayden	PTS	8	21/12/1995	Bossier City, Louisiana, U.S.	
Win	20-15	Jesse Ferguson	TKO	8	19/10/1995	Las Vegas, Nevada, U.S.	
Win	14-2	Anthony Willis	TKO	6	11/08/1995	New Orleans, Louisiana, U.S.	Referee stopped the bout at 2:26 of the sixth round.
Win	9-8	Art Card	KO	2	31/03/1995	Detroit, Michigan, U.S.	
Win	13-10-1	William Morris	TKO	5	07/03/1995	Prior Lake, Minnesota, U.S.	
Win	8-14	Larry Davis	TKO	1	10/02/1995	Philadelphia, Pennsylvania, U.S.	Referee stopped the bout at 2:46 of the first round.
Win	20-7	Terry Anderson	KO	2	19/01/1995	Auburn Hills, Michigan, U.S.	Anderson knocked out at 1:45 of the second round.
Win	4-47-2	John Basil Jackson	TKO	5	20/12/1994	Rosemont, Illinois, U.S.	
Win	18-1	John Ruiz	SD	12	04/08/1994	Mashantucket, Connecticut, U.S.	IBO World Heavyweight Title. 118-110, 115-113, 113-115.
Win	13-24-1	Mark Young	UD	10	17/02/1994	Joliet, Illinois, U.S.	
Win	5-6-6	David Graves	PTS	6	06/12/1993	Rosemont, Illinois, U.S.	
Win	44-15-4	Michael Greer	TKO	4	27/08/1993	Countryside, Illinois, U.S.	
Win	12-1	Phil Scott	TKO	2	23/07/1993	Countryside, Illinois, U.S.	Referee stopped the bout at 2:28 of the second round.
Win	8-3	Nick Kendrick	KO	1	25/06/1993	Countryside, Illinois, U.S.	
Loss	8-0	Jeremy Williams	KO	2	08/05/1993	Stateline, Nevada, U.S.	Nicholson knocked out at 2:56 of the second round.
Win	14-23-1	Tim Morrison	TKO	3	26/04/1993	Rosemont, Illinois, U.S.	
Win	10-50	Rocky Bentley	KO	3	26/03/1993	Countryside, Illinois, U.S.	
Win	0-7	Luis Torres	KO	3	13/03/1993	Aurora, Illinois, U.S.	
Win	--	Mark Posey	KO	1	26/02/1993	Countryside, Illinois, U.S.	
Win	12-37-6	Danny Blake	UD	6	22/01/1993	Countryside, Illinois, U.S.	
Win	1-28-2	Jordan Keepers	KO	1	08/01/1993	Chicago, Illinois, U.S.	
Win	3-27	James Holly	KO	1	11/12/1992	Countryside, Illinois, U.S.	
Win	--	Don Blake	KO	1	25/11/1992	Las Vegas, Nevada, U.S.	
Win	2-10-1	Dave Slaughter	KO	1	23/10/1992	Countryside, Illinois, U.S.	
Win	4-2-2	Dan Nieves	UD	4	14/10/1992	Rosemont, Illinois, U.S.	

Vacant Title last held by Lionel Butler	IBO Heavyweight Champion; 4 August 1994 – October 1994; Stripped	Succeeded by Jimmy Thunder
