= Vidas Markevičius =

Lithuanian boxer (1963–1992)

Personal information
- Nationality: Lithuanian
- Born: 25 August 1963 Kaunas, Lithuanian SSR, Soviet Union
- Died: October 1992 Kaunas, Lithuania

Sport
- Sport: Boxing

Vidas Markevičius (25 August 1963 – October 1992) was a Lithuanian boxer. He competed in the men's heavyweight event at the 1992 Summer Olympics.
