= Baik Hyun-man =

South Korean boxer (born 1964)

Personal information
- Born: January 27, 1964 (age 62) Sageun-dong, Seongdong-gu, Seoul, South Korea
- Height: 1.89 m (6 ft 2 1/2 in)
- Weight: 91 kg (201 lb)

Sport
- Country: South Korea
- Sport: Boxing
Medal record
Men's Boxing
Representing South Korea
Olympic Games
Silver medal – second place	1988 Seoul	Heavyweight
Asian Games
Gold medal – first place	1986 Seoul	Super Heavyweight
Gold medal – first place	1990 Beijing	Super Heavyweight
Asian Championships
Gold medal – first place	1985 Bangkok	Super Heavyweight
Gold medal – first place	1987 Kuwait City	Heavyweight
Bronze medal – third place	1995 Tashkent	Super Heavyweight

- Baik Hyun-man
- Hangul: 백현만
- Hanja: 白賢萬
- RR: Baek Hyeonman
- MR: Paek Hyŏnman

Baik Hyun-man (born January 27, 1964) is a former heavyweight amateur boxer from South Korea, who won the silver medal in his weight division at the 1988 Summer Olympics in Seoul, South Korea. In the final he was knocked out in the first round by Ray Mercer of the United States.

== Results ==
1988 Summer Olympics
Event	Round	Result	Opponent	Score
Heavyweight	First	bye		
Heavyweight	Second	Win	(Socialist Federal Republic of Yugoslavia) Zeljko Mavrovic	5-0
Heavyweight	Quarterfinal	Win	(East Germany) Maik Heydeck	RSC 1
Heavyweight	Semifinal	Win	(Poland) Andrzej Golota	RSC 2
Heavyweight	Final	Loss	(United States) Ray Mercer	KO 1
