= Otunga =

Otunga is a surname. Notable people with the surname include:

- David Otunga (born 1980), American wrestler, actor, and lawyer
- Maurice Michael Otunga (1923–2003), Kenyan Roman cardinal and Archbishop of Nairobi

== See also ==
- Obunga
