= Krzysztof Rojek =

Polish boxer

Personal information
- Nationality: Polish
- Born: 16 February 1972 (age 53); Żagań, Poland

Sport
- Sport: Boxing

Krzysztof Rojek (born 16 February 1972) is a Polish boxer. He competed in the men's heavyweight event at the 1992 Summer Olympics.
