= Chae Sung-bae =

South Korean boxer (born 1968)

Medal record

Men's boxing

Representing South Korea

World Amateur Championships
Bronze medal – third place	1991 Sydney	Heavyweight

Asian Games
Gold medal – first place	1990 Beijing	Heavyweight

Chae Sung-bae (Korean: 채성배; Hanja: 蔡成培; born December 16, 1968, in Gwangju, South Korea) is a former South Korean heavyweight amateur boxer.

== Results ==
1991 World Championships

Event	Round	Result	Opponent	Score
Heavyweight	First	Win	(Soviet Union) Evgeniy Sudakov	15-14
Heavyweight	Quarterfinal	Win	(Germany) Bert Teuchert	23-16
Heavyweight	Semifinal	Loss	(Netherlands) Arnold Vanderlyde	RSC 3

1992 AIBA Challenge Matches

Event	Round	Result	Opponent	Score
Heavyweight	Final	Loss	(Cuba) Felix Savon	RSC 1

1992 Summer Olympics

Event	Round	Result	Opponent	Score
Heavyweight	First	bye		
Heavyweight	Second	Loss	(Netherlands) Arnold Vanderlyde	13-14
