= Mark Hulstrøm =

Danish boxer

Personal information
- Nationality: Danish
- Born: 28 December 1965 (age 59); London, England

Sport
- Sport: Boxing

Mark Hultgren (born 28 December 1965) is a Danish boxer. He competed in the men's heavyweight event at the 1992 Summer Olympics. He has been the headcoach for almost three decades in Korsør Amateur Boxing Club, and made several Danish champions over the years. A big asset for amateurboxing in Denmark. Mark had 20 professional boxing fights, with 16 wins of which 9 were won by knockout.
