= Aleksey Chudinov =

Soviet boxer

Personal information
- Full name: Aleksey Viktorovich Chudinov
- Nationality: Soviet Russian
- Born: 28 May 1972 Podolsk, Russian SFSR, Soviet Union
- Died: 1997 (aged 24–25) Podolsk, Russia

Sport
- Sport: Boxing

Aleksey Viktorovich Chudinov (28 May 1972 – 1997) was a Soviet and Russian boxer. He competed in the men's heavyweight event at the 1992 Summer Olympics.

== Biography ==
Chudinov took up boxing at the age of 12. He was killed during a criminal altercation at his hometown of Podolsk in 1997. The city of Podolsk hosts an annual a boxing memorial tournament dedicated to Chudinov.
