= Oleksandr Yatsenko (boxer) =

Ukrainian boxer

Personal information
- Nationality: Ukrainian
- Born: 5 August 1979 (age 46)

Sport
- Sport: Boxing
Medal record
Men's amateur boxing
Representing Ukraine
Junior World Championships
Gold medal – first place	1996 Havana	Heavyweight
Junior European Championships
Silver medal – second place	1997 Birmingham	Heavyweight

Oleksandr Yatsenko (born 5 August 1979) is a Ukrainian boxer. He competed in the men's heavyweight event at the 2000 Summer Olympics.
