= John Pettersson (boxer) =

Swedish boxer

Personal information
- Nationality: Swedish
- Born: 4 November 1968 (age 56); Västerås, Sweden

Sport
- Sport: Boxing

John Pettersson (born 4 November 1968) is a Swedish boxer. He competed in the men's heavyweight event at the 1992 Summer Olympics.
