= Michael Katz (journalist) =

American sportswriter (1939–2025)

Michael Katz (December 2, 1939 – January 27, 2025) was an American sportswriter.

== Life and career ==
Katz was born in The Bronx, New York on December 2, 1939. After leaving high school he was accepted into City College of New York and while there wrote for the college newspaper, The Campus, becoming sports editor.

Katz later acted as a stringer for The New York Times covering City College sports. He became a copy boy for The New York Times and worked his way up to the sportsdesk. In 1966 he moved to Europe to work for The New York Times international edition and in 1968 he covered the Floyd Patterson vs Jimmy Ellis heavyweight title fight in Stockholm, Sweden. In 1970 he went freelance and wrote for several publications before returning to the United States in 1972 where he also re-joined The New York Times. In 1979 Katz was covering boxing full-time for the Times.

In 1985 he switched to the New York Daily News. In 2012 he was inducted into the International Boxing Hall of Fame. Katz died on January 27, 2025, at the age of 85. He was predeceased by his daughter in 2021 and is survived only by his granddaughter “BB”.
