= Andrew Golota =

Polish boxer (born 1968)

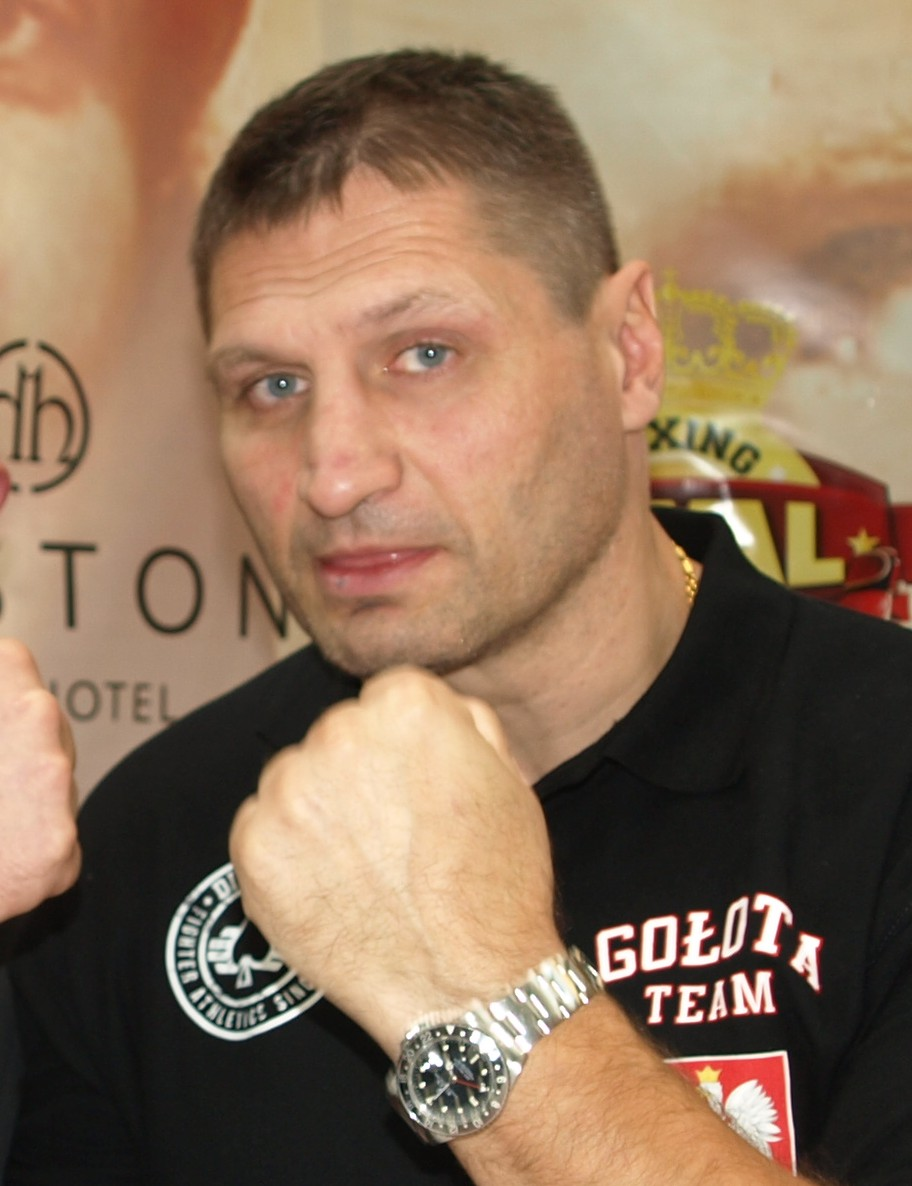
- Golota in 2008

Personal information
- Born: Andrzej Gołota; 5 January 1968 (age 58) Warsaw, Poland
- Height: 1.93 m (6 ft 4 in)
- Weight: Heavyweight

Boxing career
- Reach: 201 cm (79 in)
- Stance: Orthodox

Boxing record
- Total fights: 52
- Wins: 41
- Win by KO: 33
- Losses: 9
- Draws: 1
- No contests: 1
Medal record
Men's amateur boxing
Representing Poland
Olympic Games
Bronze medal – third place	1988 Seoul	Heavyweight
European Championships
Bronze medal – third place	1989 Athens	Heavyweight

Andrzej Jan Gołota (Polish: [ˈandʐɛj ɡɔˈwɔta]; born 5 January 1968), best known as Andrew Golota, is a Polish former professional boxer who competed from 1992 to 2013. He challenged four times for a heavyweight world title (by all four major sanctioning bodies), and as an amateur won a bronze medal in the heavyweight division at the 1988 Olympics. Despite his accomplishments and more than 40 professional wins, Golota is perhaps best known for twice being disqualified against Riddick Bowe for repeated low blows in fights that Golota was winning. On October 4, 1997, he became the first Pole to challenge for a heavyweight boxing crown when he fought WBC champion Lennox Lewis at Boardwalk Hall in Atlantic City. He had a bout with Mike Tyson in 2000, which he first withdrew from, but afterward was ruled no-contest. In November 2016, Golota was inducted into the Illinois Boxing Hall of Fame.

== Amateur career ==
The Warsaw-born, Golota had 111 wins and 10 losses in an amateur career that culminated in his winning a bronze medal at the 1988 Summer Olympics. Golota won other international amateur tournaments as well.

In 1990, he got into a fight with a machinist "about half a foot and 50 pounds smaller" in a bar in Poland. Facing charges of assault and battery, he fled rather than risk five years in prison. Later that year, he married an American citizen of Polish descent and settled in Chicago. Gołota's Olympic results were as follows:

- 1st round bye
- Defeated Svilen Rusinov (Bulgaria) 5–0
- Defeated Harold Obunga (Kenya) 5–0
- Lost to Baik Hyun-Man (South Korea) RSC 2

== Professional career ==
In 1992, Golota turned professional, knocking out Roosevelt Shuler in three rounds. He had three more knockouts and then went the distance for the first time, defeating Robert Smith in six rounds. He won his next 16 fights by knockout. His wins included Bobby Crabtree and Jeff Lampkin. Following his KO of Crabtree he was featured in Ring Magazine's new faces section. Soon after, he faced a respected contender, Maron Wilson. Golota won a ten-round decision. He won his next five bouts by knockout. His opponents included Samson Po'uha and Darnell Nicholson, both of whom were considered fringe contenders at the time. The win over Po'uha was memorable for the moment in which Gołota bit Po'uha on the side of the neck, two years before the bite-including rematch between Evander Holyfield and Mike Tyson.

=== Golota vs. Bowe I & II ===
Golota's first high-profile fight came against former heavyweight champion Riddick Bowe. Bowe had not fought in nearly a year since his third and final fight with Evander Holyfield, which he won by technical knockout in the eighth round, and had said regarding his opponent, "how do you train for a bum?", paying no attention to his opponent's win–loss record. The fight was held at Madison Square Garden on 11 July 1996, and was televised by HBO as part of its World Championship Boxing series.

Early in the fight it appeared that Bowe had underestimated his opponent's skills. However, Golota's penchant for not following the rules was also showcased in this fight as he took to striking Bowe below the belt. After being repeatedly warned, referee Wayne Kelly began deducting points from Golota and had done so twice prior to the seventh round. Early in that round, Kelly took a third point from Golota for again punching Bowe below the belt, and warned him that if he did so again, he was going to lose the fight. Golota continued to fight and with less than a minute left in the round landed several hard shots that appeared to have Bowe staggered. However, with 37 seconds remaining in the round Golota dropped Bowe with another punch directly to the groin, and Kelly disqualified him. What ensued was a dramatic riot that left a large number of civilians and policemen injured, including Gołota himself, who was hit by a member of Bowe's entourage with a two-way radio and required eleven stitches to close a cut on his head. The riot, which has been named "Riot at the Garden", was called Event of the Year by Ring Magazine.

The controversy of Golota vs. Bowe I created interest in a rematch, which was held in Atlantic City, New Jersey on December 14, 1996. Golota vs. Bowe II was on Pay Per View and Gołota once again led Bowe on the scorecards only to be disqualified in the ninth round by referee Eddie Cotton, again for multiple shots to Bowe's groin. This fight also proved to be controversial, and a protest was filed by Gołota's camp to try to overturn the fight's result. Michael Katz, a sportswriter, coined the term Foul Pole for Gołota. Both fights are featured on HBO's documentary Legendary Nights The Tale of Bowe Golota.

=== Championship fight with Lewis ===
Despite two losses in a row, Gołota became the WBC number one contender. On 4 October 1997, he received a shot at the world's Heavyweight championship against Lennox Lewis in Atlantic City, New Jersey. Gołota was knocked out in the first round.

Gołota subsequently claimed that an injection of lidocaine for tendonitis in his right knee given to him by his physician shortly before the fight made him woozy and impaired his vision. The adverse effects of lidocaine include dizziness, blurred vision, seizures. As a result, he filed a medical malpractice suit against his physician, claiming that the injection had cost him the fight and a deal with HBO for $21 million to broadcast his next four to five fights.

=== Later career ===
Gołota's boxing career continued with his beating former 2-time world champion Tim Witherspoon by decision. In his next match, he lost to Michael Grant by a knockout in the tenth round in one of The Ring's 1999 fights of the year. Gołota scored two knockdowns of Grant in the first round. He was ahead on all three judges' scorecards in the tenth round when he himself was knocked down. When asked by referee Randy Neuman whether he wanted to continue, he shook his head twice and then haltingly answered "No".

In 2000, Gołota fought in China beating Marcus Rhodes with a third-round knockout. Later in 2000, he faced former heavyweight champion Mike Tyson. Tyson knocked Golota down in the first round, and in between rounds Golota told his corner to stop the fight but his corner talked him into continuing. In the third round, as he had done in the Grant match, Gołota told the referee he did not want to continue, despite his team desperately urging him on. It was later reported that Golota had received injuries such as a fractured left cheekbone and a herniated disk in his neck, and at the time it was not clear if he would be able to box again. He later claimed a headbutt impaired him during the fight, which was one of his main reasons for deciding not to continue. The result of the fight was eventually changed to no contest when Tyson failed a post fight drug test, testing positive for marijuana. Following the Tyson fight, Gołota was inactive for nearly three years before returning to the ring on 14 August 2003. He scored a technical knockout of journeyman Brian Nix in the seventh round. On November 15, Golota knocked out Terrence Lewis in the sixth round at Verona, New York.

==== Later World title shots ====
Gołota then received a second world title shot, fighting IBF heavyweight champion Chris Byrd at New York City's Madison Square Garden on 17 April 2004. The fight resulted in a draw.

On 13 November 2004, Gołota received his second world title shot in a row. Despite knocking down WBA champion John Ruiz twice within the bout, he lost by unanimous decision.

Golota received his third world title try in a row on 21 May 2005 against WBO champion Lamon Brewster. Though heavily favored to win, Gołota lost when Brewster knocked him down three times inside the first round, prompting the referee to stop the bout. On 9 June 2007, he beat Jeremy Bates in the 2nd round by technical knockout. Gołota fought Kevin McBride on October 6, 2007 in Madison Square Garden and won by TKO in the 6th round, winning the inaugural IBF North American Heavyweight championship.

On 19 January 2008, Gołota defeated Mike Mollo by unanimous decision in 12 rounds to win the World Boxing Association Fedelatin heavyweight championship belt. In January, 2009, Gołota lost by first-round TKO to Ray Austin. On 24 October 2009 in Łódź, Gołota fought Tomasz Adamek and lost by TKO in the 5th round. The event was hosted on Polsat TV, it was also broadcast live online on ipla.tv platform. It was the largest live internet transmission in Poland.

== Professional boxing record ==
52 fights	41 wins	9 losses
By knockout	33	6
By decision	8	1
By disqualification	0	2
Draws	1	
No contests	1	

No.	Result	Record	Opponent	Type	Round, time	Date	Location	Notes
52	Loss	41–9–1 (1)	Przemysław Saleta	KO	6 (10), 2:49	23 Feb 2013	Ergo Arena, Gdańsk, Poland	
51	Loss	41–8–1 (1)	Tomasz Adamek	TKO	5 (10), 1:20	24 Oct 2009	Atlas Arena, Łódź, Poland	For vacant IBF International heavyweight title
50	Loss	41–7–1 (1)	Ray Austin	RTD	1 (12), 3:00	7 Nov 2008	Sichuan Gymnasium, Chengdu, China	For vacant WBC–USNBC heavyweight title
49	Win	41–6–1 (1)	Mike Mollo	UD	12	19 Jan 2008	Madison Square Garden, New York City, New York, US	Won WBA Fedelatin heavyweight title
48	Win	40–6–1 (1)	Kevin McBride	TKO	6 (12), 2:42	6 Oct 2007	Madison Square Garden, New York City, New York, US	Won vacant IBF North American heavyweight title
47	Win	39–6–1 (1)	Jeremy Bates	TKO	2 (10), 2:59	9 Jun 2007	Spodek, Katowice, Poland	
46	Loss	38–6–1 (1)	Lamon Brewster	TKO	1 (12), 0:52	21 May 2005	United Center, Chicago, Illinois, US	For WBO heavyweight title
45	Loss	38–5–1 (1)	John Ruiz	UD	12	13 Nov 2004	Madison Square Garden, New York City, New York, US	For WBA heavyweight title
44	Draw	38–4–1 (1)	Chris Byrd	SD	12	17 Apr 2004	Madison Square Garden, New York City, New York, US	For IBF heavyweight title
43	Win	38–4 (1)	Terrence Lewis	TKO	6 (10), 1:25	14 Nov 2003	Turning Stone Resort Casino, Verona, New York, US	
42	Win	37–4 (1)	Brian Nix	TKO	7 (10), 2:43	14 Aug 2003	Dover Downs, Dover, Delaware, US	
41	NC	36–4 (1)	Mike Tyson	RTD	3 (10), 3:00	20 Oct 2000	The Palace, Auburn Hills, Michigan, US	Originally an RTD win for Tyson, later ruled an NC after he failed a drug test
40	Win	36–4	Orlin Norris	UD	10	16 Jun 2000	Mandalay Bay Events Center, Paradise, Nevada, US	
39	Win	35–4	Marcus Rhode	TKO	3 (10), 2:19	22 Apr 2000	Tianhe Stadium, Guangzhou, China	
38	Loss	34–4	Michael Grant	TKO	10 (12), 1:31	20 Nov 1999	Etess Arena, Atlantic City, New Jersey, US	For NABF heavyweight title
37	Win	34–3	Quinn Navarre	TKO	6 (10)	26 Jun 1999	Centennial Hall, Wrocław, Poland	
36	Win	33–3	Jesse Ferguson	UD	10	30 Jan 1999	Boardwalk Hall, Atlantic City, New Jersey, US	
35	Win	32–3	Tim Witherspoon	UD	10	2 Oct 1998	Centennial Hall, Wrocław, Poland	
34	Win	31–3	Corey Sanders	UD	10	21 Jul 1998	Etess Arena, Atlantic City, New Jersey, US	
33	Win	30–3	Jack Basting	TKO	3 (10), 2:09	8 May 1998	Trump Marina, Atlantic City, New Jersey, US	
32	Win	29–3	Eli Dixon	KO	6 (10), 2:15	14 Apr 1998	Foxwoods Resort Casino, Ledyard, Connecticut, US	
31	Loss	28–3	Lennox Lewis	KO	1 (12), 1:35	4 Oct 1997	Boardwalk Hall, Atlantic City, New Jersey, US	For WBC heavyweight title
30	Loss	28–2	Riddick Bowe	DQ	9 (10), 2:58	14 Dec 1996	Convention Hall, Atlantic City, New Jersey, US	Golota disqualified for repeated low blows
29	Loss	28–1	Riddick Bowe	DQ	7 (12), 2:37	11 Jul 1996	Madison Square Garden, New York City, New York, US	Golota disqualified for repeated low blows
28	Win	28–0	Danell Nicholson	RTD	8 (10), 3:00	15 Mar 1996	Convention Hall, Atlantic City, New Jersey, US	
27	Win	27–0	Charles Hostetter	TKO	2 (10), 2:36	30 Jan 1996	Medieval Times, Lyndhurst, New Jersey, US	
26	Win	26–0	Jason Waller	TKO	2 (10)	18 Nov 1995	Convention Hall, Atlantic City, New Jersey, US	
25	Win	25–0	West Turner	TKO	1 (8), 0:39	26 Aug 1995	Convention Hall, Atlantic City, New Jersey, US	
24	Win	24–0	Samson Po'uha	TKO	5 (10), 2:44	16 May 1995	Steel Pier, Atlantic City, New Jersey, US	
23	Win	23–0	Marion Wilson	UD	10	11 Apr 1995	Bismarck Hotel, Chicago, Illinois, US	
22	Win	22–0	Dwayne Hall	TKO	1 (8)	26 Jan 1995	Rosemont, Illinois, US	
21	Win	21–0	Darren Hayden	TKO	7 (10), 3:00	1 Nov 1994	MGM Grand Garden Arena, Paradise, Nevada, US	
20	Win	20–0	Jeff Lampkin	RTD	1 (10), 3:00	13 Aug 1994	The Aladdin, Paradise, Nevada, US	
19	Win	19–0	Jesse Shelby	TKO	2 (8), 2:59	18 Jun 1994	Bismark Hotel, Chicago, Illinois, US	
18	Win	18–0	Terry Davis	TKO	1 (10), 1:51	6 May 1994	Convention Hall, Atlantic City, New Jersey, US	
17	Win	17–0	Larry Davis	KO	1 (8)	16 Mar 1994	Bismarck Hotel, Chicago, Illinois, US	
16	Win	16–0	Donnell Wingfield	TKO	1 (8)	14 Jan 1994	Carmel High School, Chicago, Illinois, US	
15	Win	15–0	Calvin Jones	TKO	2 (6)	23 Nov 1993	Hyatt Regency O'Hare, Rosemont, Illinois, US	
14	Win	14–0	Andre Smith	KO	1 (8), 2:59	4 Sep 1993	The Aladdin, Paradise, Nevada, US	
13	Win	13–0	Marion Wilson	PTS	8	10 Jul 1993	Fernwood Resort, Bushkill, Pennsylvania, US	
12	Win	12–0	Carlton West	TKO	2 (8)	22 Jun 1993	Trump Taj Mahal, Atlantic City, New Jersey, US	
11	Win	11–0	Kevin P. Porter	KO	3 (6)	15 May 1993	The Eagles Ballroom, Milwaukee, Wisconsin, US	
10	Win	10–0	Bobby Crabtree	TKO	2 (10), 1:14	26 Mar 1993	Union Hall, Countryside, Illinois, US	
9	Win	9–0	Andre Crowder	TKO	1 (6)	5 Feb 1993	The Eagles Ballroom, Milwaukee, Wisconsin, US	
8	Win	8–0	Eddie Taylor	TKO	1 (8), 2:49	5 Dec 1992	Expo Center, Dolton, Illinois, US	
7	Win	7–0	Aaron Brown	TKO	2 (6)	3 Oct 1992	St. Andrews Gym, Chicago, Illinois, US	
6	Win	6–0	James Holly	KO	1 (6)	28 Aug 1992	Union Hall, Countryside, Illinois, US	
5	Win	5–0	Robert Smith	PTS	6	24 Jul 1992	Union Hall, Countryside, Illinois, US	
4	Win	4–0	Joey Christjohn	TKO	1 (6)	20 Jun 1992	St. Andrews Gym, Chicago, Illinois, US	
3	Win	3–0	Charles Presswood	KO	1 (4)	27 Mar 1992	Union Hall, Countryside, Illinois, US	
2	Win	2–0	Joe Jones	KO	1 (4), 2:13	28 Feb 1992	Union Hall, Countryside, Illinois, US	
1	Win	1–0	Roosevelt Shuler	TKO	3 (4)	7 Feb 1992	United Community Center, Milwaukee, Wisconsin, US	

== Television viewership ==
=== Poland ===
Date	Fight	Viewership (avg.)	Network	Source(s)
2 October 1998	Andrew Golota vs. Tim Witherspoon	12,500,000	Polsat	
17 April 2004	Chris Byrd vs. Andrew Golota	1,309,000	TVN	
24 October 2009	Andrew Golota vs. Tomasz Adamek	8,190,000 – 13,000,000	Polsat	
	Total viewership	21,999,000 – 26,809,000		

==== Pay-per-view bouts ====
Date	Fight	Pay-per-view buys	Network	Source(s)
23 February 2013	Andrew Golota vs. Przemysław Saleta	120,000	Cyfra+ PPV	
	Total sales	120,000	Cyfra+ PPV	

=== United States ===
==== Pay-per-view bouts ====
Date	Fight	Pay-per-view buys	Network	Source(s)
4 October 1997	Lennox Lewis vs. Andrew Golota	300,000	HBO PPV	
20 October 2000	Mike Tyson vs. Andrew Golota	450,000	Showtime PPV	
17 April 2004	Chris Byrd vs. Andrew Golota	75,000	Spike TV/King Vision	
11 December 2004	John Ruiz vs. Andrew Golota	120,000	HBO PPV	
	Total sales	945,000		

== Other ==
Golota took part in Census 2010 commercials, recorded in Polish and English. In 2010, he appeared in the Polish edition of Dancing with the Stars (Taniec z Gwiazdami) with partner Magdalena Soszyńska-Michno. In his first appearance he danced the waltz. He was eliminated on 7 November 2010, at the quarter final stage and he finished in 5th place. He has also participated in Polish version of The Mole (Agent - Gwiazdy), he has been eliminated and finished in eighth place.

Sporting positions
Regional boxing titles
New title	IBF North American heavyweight champion 6 October 2007 – January 2008; Vacated	Vacant Title next held by Cedric Boswell
Preceded by Mike Mollo	WBA Fedelatin heavyweight champion 19 January 2008 – November 2008; Vacated	Vacant Title next held by Odlanier Solis
