= Michael Bennett (boxer) =

American boxer

Medal record

Men's amateur boxing

Representing United States

World Championships
Gold medal – first place	Houston 1999	Heavyweight

Michael Bennett (born March 26, 1971, in Chicago, Illinois) is an American former boxer who won the amateur world championships in 1999 and represented the United States at the 2000 Summer Olympics in the heavyweight division (limit 201 lbs).

== Early years ==
He began boxing in 1996, 25 years old, while in prison, as a way of staying in shape while serving a sentence for armed robbery. He spent seven years in prison, was just happy to have the opportunity to compete.

== Amateur career ==
Bennett had a stellar amateur career prior to turning professional.

He won the world championships in Houston 1999 with wins over Patrick Mesters, Uzbek Serik Umirbekov and German Steffen Kretschmann but won the final by forfeit only because Cuban superstar Félix Savón boycotted the final.

As a member of the 2000 US Olympic team, he beat Poland's Wojciech Bartnik in the 1st round of matches on an 11–2 decision before losing to Cuban Félix Savón on a 23–8 points stoppage (RSCO) in the 3rd round in his next match. "I can't be anything but pleased with. I reached for my star. I just fell short. I gave him too many straight shots and he's a one-punch guy. I did my best but he was the best. I wasn't in awe of him, but he's just a great guy and he deserves everything he's got. I've been able to live a lot of men's and women's dreams by coming and competing," Bennett said on his loss to Savón.

In addition to his Olympic accomplishments, Bennett was also a National Amateur Heavyweight Boxing Champion in 2000 with a win over Jason Estrada.

== Professional career ==
Bennett turned professional in 2000 at cruiserweight, but his career did not last long. After a series of knockout losses against limited opposition, Bennett retired in 2003.

== Professional boxing record ==
14 fights	10 wins	4 losses
By knockout	8	4
By decision	2	0

Preceded by Malik Scott	United States Amateur Heavyweight Champion; 2000	Succeeded by BJ Flores
