= Elio Ibarra =

Argentine boxer (born 1967)

Personal information
- Born: October 30, 1967 (age 58)
Medal record
Men's Boxing
Representing Argentina
Pan American Games
Bronze medal – third place	1991 Havana	Super Heavyweight

Elio Esteban Ibarra Carmona (born October 30, 1967) is a retired boxer from Argentina. He won a bronze medal in the Men's Super Heavyweight (+ 91 kg) division at the 1991 Pan American Games. Ibarra represented his native South American country at the 1992 Summer Olympics, where he was defeated in the first round.
