= Emilio Leti =

Samoan boxer

Personal information
- Nationality: Samoan
- Born: 23 November 1963 (age 61)

Sport
- Sport: Boxing

Emilio Leti (born 23 November 1963) is a Samoan boxer. He competed in the men's heavyweight event at the 1992 Summer Olympics. He later moved to New Zealand and won titles in New Zealand and Australia.
