= Vojtěch Rückschloss =

Slovak boxer

Personal information
- Nationality: Slovak
- Born: 14 March 1969 (age 56); Ružomberok, Czechoslovakia

Sport
- Sport: Boxing

Vojtěch Rückschloss (born 14 March 1969) is a Slovak boxer. He competed in the men's heavyweight event at the 1992 Summer Olympics.
