= Rudolf Gavenčiak =

Slovak boxer

Personal information
- Nationality: Slovak
- Born: 7 February 1965 (age 60); Nová Bystrica, Czechoslovakia

Sport
- Sport: Boxing

Rudolf Gavenčiak (born 7 February 1965) is a Slovak boxer. He competed in the men's heavyweight event at the 1988 Summer Olympics.
