= Luigi Gaudiano =

Italian boxer (born 1965)

Personal information
- Born: July 3, 1965 (age 60)
Medal record
Men's Boxing
Representing Italy
European Amateur Championships
Bronze medal – third place	1987 Turin	Heavyweight
Mediterranean Games
Silver medal – second place	1987 Latakia	Heavyweight

Luigi Gaudiano (born July 3, 1965, in Pagani, Salerno) is a former amateur boxer from Italy. He is best known for winning the bronze medal at the 1987 European Championships in Turin, Italy in the Men's Heavyweight (– 91 kg) division. He represented his native country at the 1988 Summer Olympics in Seoul, South Korea.
