= Ramzan Sebiyev =

Russian boxer

Personal information
- Nationality: Russian
- Born: 26 October 1969 (age 57) Grozny, Russian SFSR, Soviet Union

Sport
- Sport: Boxing

Ramzan Sebiyev (born 26 October 1969) is a Russian boxer. He competed in the men's heavyweight event at the 1988 Summer Olympics.
