= Harold Obunga =

Kenyan boxer (1959–1995)

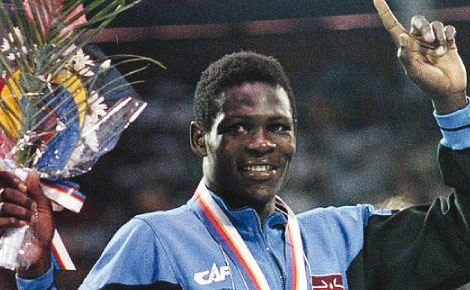

Personal information
- Nationality: Kenyan
- Born: 21 November 1959
- Died: 16 September 1995 (aged 35)

Sport
- Sport: Boxing

Harold Obunga (21 November 1959 – 16 September 1995) was a Kenyan boxer. He competed in the men's heavyweight event at the 1988 Summer Olympics. He lost in quarterfinal to Andrew Golota.
