= Paul Lawson (boxer) =

British boxer

Personal information
- Nationality: British
- Born: 2 December 1966 (age 58); London, England

Sport
- Sport: Boxing

Paul Lawson (born 2 December 1966) is a British boxer. He competed in the men's heavyweight event at the 1992 Summer Olympics.
