= Amrou Moustafa =

Egyptian boxer (born 1972)

Personal information
- Nationality: Egyptian
- Born: 12 July 1972 (age 52)

Sport
- Sport: Boxing

Amrou Moustafa (born 12 July 1972) is an Egyptian boxer. He competed at the 1996 Summer Olympics and the 2000 Summer Olympics.

He won the silver medal in heavyweight at the 1999 All-Africa Games.
