= Jackson Chanet =

French boxer

Personal information
- Nationality: French
- Born: 7 February 1978 (age 48) Saint-Dizier, Haute-Marne
- Height: 1.73 m (5 ft 8 in)
- Weight: 91 kg (201 lb)

Sport
- Sport: Boxing
- Weight class: Heavyweight
- Club: CP Saint Dizier
Medal record
European Amateur Boxing Championships
Gold medal – first place	2000 Tampere	Heavyweight

Jackson Chanet (born 7 February 1978) is a French boxer who won the heavyweight title at the 2000 European Amateur Boxing Championships. From 1998-2000, he was a French heavyweight (201 pounds (91 kg) limit) champion. Though he lost to Sultan Ibragimov at the 2000 Sydney Olympics, he held the European title against Vitali Tsypko in 2005 until defeated by Mger Mkrtchyan in his first defense.
