= Freddy Rojas =

Cuban boxer (born 1969)

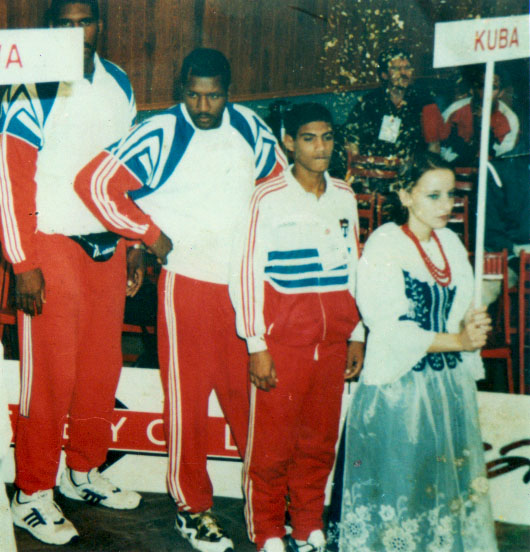

Personal information
- Born: 27 August 1969 (age 55); Camagüey, Cuba

Sport
- Sport: Boxing

Freddy Rojas (born 27 August 1969) is a Cuban former amateur boxer. He competed in the men's light heavyweight event at the 1996 Summer Olympics.
