= Paul Douglas (boxer) =

Irish boxer (born 1964)

Personal information
- Nationality: Northern Irish
- Born: 2 May 1964 (age 61); Belfast, Northern Ireland

Sport
- Sport: Boxing

Paul Douglas (born 2 May 1964) is an Irish boxer. He competed in the men's heavyweight event at the 1992 Summer Olympics.
