= Bert Teuchert =

German boxer

Personal information
- Nationality: German
- Born: 1 September 1966 (age 58); Freiburg im Breisgau, Germany

Sport
- Sport: Boxing

Bert Teuchert (born 1 September 1966) is a German boxer. He competed in the men's heavyweight event at the 1992 Summer Olympics.
