= José Ortega (boxer) =

Spanish boxer (born 1963)

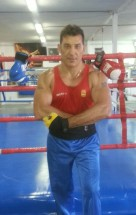
José Ortega

José Ortega Chumilla (born October 2, 1963 in Yecla, Murcia) is a former boxer from Spain, who represented his native country at two consecutive Summer Olympics, starting in 1988. At the 1992 Summer Olympics in Barcelona, Spain he was eliminated in the second round of the heavyweight division (– 91 kg) by New Zealand's David Tua.

In his hometown of Yecla, a sports pavilion is named after him, the Pabellón polideportivo José Ortega Chumilla.

In 2016 at age 52, Ortega looked to make his return to the boxing ring at the 6th European Police & Fire Games held in Huelva, Spain.

== 1988 Olympic results ==
Below is the record of José Ortega, a Spanish heavyweight boxer who competed at the 1988 Seoul Olympics:

- Round of 32: lost to Gyula Alvics (Hungary) by decision, 0-5
