= Maik Heydeck =

German boxer

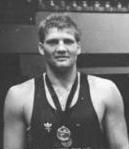
- Maik Heydeck in Berlin, 1990

Personal information
- Born: 8 September 1965 (age 60)
Medal record
Men's boxing
Representing East Germany
Men's Boxing
World Championships
Bronze medal – third place	1989 Moscow	Super Heavyweight

Maik Heydeck (born 8 September 1965 in Angermünde) is an East German amateur boxer who competed at the super heavyweight division, winning a bronze medal at the 1989 World Championships in Moscow. He represented the SC Dynamo Berlin / Sportvereinigung (SV) Dynamo.
