= Georgios Stefanopoulos =

Greek boxer (born 1962)

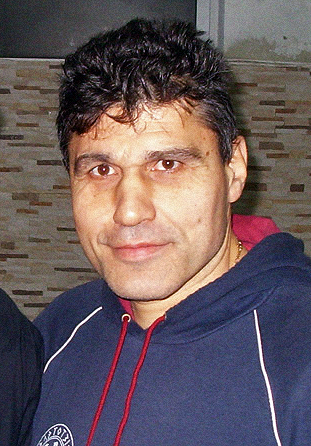
- Georgios Stefanopoulos in 2010

Personal information
- Full name: Γεώργιος Στεφανόπουλος
- Nationality: Greece
- Born: March 31, 1962 (age 64) Peristeri, Attiki
- Height: 1.80 m (5 ft 11 in)
- Weight: 91 kg (201 lb)

Sport
- Sport: Boxing
- Weight class: Heavyweight
Medal record
European Amateur Boxing Championships
Silver medal – second place	1991 Gothenburg	Heavyweight
Bronze medal – third place	1993 Bursa	Heavyweight
Mediterranean Games Amateur Boxing Championships
Gold medal – first place	1993 Narbonne	Heavyweight
Silver medal – second place	1991 Athens	Heavyweight
Bronze medal – third place	1987 Latakia	Heavyweight
European Amateur Kickboxing Championships
Gold medal – first place	1986 Athens	Heavyweight

Georgios Stefanopoulos (Greek: Γεώργιος Στεφανόπουλος; born March 31, 1962, in Peristeri, Attiki) is a former boxer from Greece, who participated in two Summer Olympics for his native country in the men's heavyweight division (– 91 kg), starting in 1984 in Los Angeles, California. He twice won a medal at the European Championships in the early 1990s. Georgios also had some success in kickboxing, winning a gold medal in the Full-Contact heavyweight category at the W.A.K.O. European Championships 1986.
