= Boxing at the 1996 Summer Olympics – Super heavyweight =

Boxing competitions

Super heavyweight boxing at the Games of the XXVI Olympiad
- Venue: Alexander Memorial Coliseum
- Dates: 23 July – 4 August
- Competitors: 19 from 19 nations

Medalists
1st place, gold medalist(s)		Wladimir Klitschko	Ukraine
2nd place, silver medalist(s)		Paea Wolfgramm	Tonga
3rd place, bronze medalist(s)		Duncan Dokiwari	Nigeria
3rd place, bronze medalist(s)		Alexei Lezin	Russia

The Super Heavyweight class in the boxing at the 1996 Summer Olympics competition was the heaviest class at the 1996 Summer Olympics in Atlanta, United States. The weight class was open for boxers weighing more than 91 kilograms. The competition in the Alexander Memorial Coliseum started on July 20, 1996 and ended on August 4, 1996.

== Qualified boxers ==
Athlete	Notes
Adalat Mamedov (AZE)	
Sergei Liakhovich (BLR)	
Jean-François Bergeron (CAN)	1st North & Central American Olympic Qualification
Alexis Rubalcaba (CUB)	1995 Pan American Games
Petr Horáček (CZE)	
Said Ahmed Ahmed (EGY)	1st African Olympic Qualification
Josué Blocus (FRA)	
René Monse (GER)	1996 European Championships
Mohammad Reza Samadi (IRI)	1995 Asian Championships
Paolo Vidoz (ITA)	
Mikhail Yurchenko (KAZ)	
Duncan Dokiwari (NGR)	1995 All-Africa Games
Safarish Khan (PAK)	
Alexei Lezin (RUS)	1996 European Championships
Attila Levin (SWE)	1996 European Championships
Paea Wolfgramm (TGA)	1995 Oceanian Championships
Wladimir Klitschko (UKR)	1996 European Championships
Lawrence Clay-Bey (USA)	
Jesús Guevara (VEN)	1996 South American Championships

== Medalists ==
Gold	Wladimir Klitschko; Ukraine
Silver	Paea Wolfgramm; Tonga
Bronze	Duncan Dokiwari; Nigeria
Bronze	Alexei Lezin; Russia

== Results ==
Round of 32
Ədalət Məmmədov (AZE)	RSC-2
Petr Horáček (CZE)	(01:10)
Josué Blocus (FRA)	RSC-2
Jesús Guevara (VEN)	(02:13)
Duncan Dokiwari (NGR)	RSC-2
Mohammad Reza Samadi (IRI)	(00:39)

Round of 16
Alexei Lezin (RUS)	RSC-1
Mikhail Yurchenko (KAZ)	(02:42)
René Monse (GER)	12
Ahmed El-Said (EGY)	9
Lawrence Clay-Bey (USA)	8
Wladimir Klitschko (UKR)	10
Jean-François Bergeron (CAN)	(00:59)
Attila Levin (SWE)	RSC-1
Adalat Mamedov (AZE)	RSC-1
Josué Blocus (FRA)	(02:11)
Safarish Khan (PAK)	(01:25)
Duncan Dokiwari (NGR)	RSC-2
Paea Wolfgramm (TGA)	10
Sergei Liakhovich (BLR)	9
Alexis Rubalcaba (CUB)	RSC-1
Paolo Vidoz (ITA)	(02:39)

Quarterfinals
Alexei Lezin (RUS)	9
René Monse (GER)	5
Wladimir Klitschko (UKR)	RSC-1
Attila Levin (SWE)	(01:43)
Adalat Mamedov (AZE)	(00:23)
Duncan Dokiwari (NGR)	RSC-3
Paea Wolfgramm (TGA)	17
Alexis Rubalcaba (CUB)	12

Semifinals
Alexei Lezin (RUS)	1
Wladimir Klitschko (UKR)	4
Duncan Dokiwari (NGR)	6
Paea Wolfgramm (TGA)	7

Final
Wladimir Klitschko (UKR)	7
Paea Wolfgramm (TGA)	3
