= Christophe Mendy =

French boxer

Personal information
- Full name: Christophe Mendy
- Nationality: France
- Born: 4 August 1971 (age 54) Rouen, Normandy, France
- Height: 1.90 m (6 ft 3 in)
- Weight: 91 kg (201 lb)

Sport
- Sport: Boxing
- Weight class: Heavyweight
- Club: BC Deville-lès-Rouen
Medal record
Men's amateur boxing
Representing France
World Amateur Championships
Bronze medal – third place	1995 Berlin	Heavyweight
European Amateur Championships
Silver medal – second place	1996 Vejle	Heavyweight
Mediterranean Games
Gold medal – first place	1993 Narbonne	Super Heavyweight

Christophe Mendy (born 4 August 1971) is a French retired boxer who represented France in the heavyweight division (– 91 kg) during the 1990s. He won the bronze medal at the 1995 World Amateur Boxing Championships in Berlin, Germany, where he was defeated in the semifinals by Cuban legend Félix Savón. A year later he ended up second at the 1996 European Amateur Boxing Championships in Vejle, Denmark. A couple of months later Mendy represented France at the 1996 Summer Olympics in Atlanta, Georgia.

== Early life ==
Mendy was born in Rouen, Normandy, in Western France. He began boxing at the age of 10 and soon came to be noticed by the local trainers, becoming an amateur boxer in the cruiser-weight division at the age of 17. He won various local championships and became vice-champion of France. He then came to be noticed by scouts for the French national team.

== Amateur career ==
In 1990, his first international tournament in Medan, Indonesia, he was the gold medallist. When he returned home, he joined the Battalion of Joinville, E.I.S. (National Army School for Sports) reserved for the French sports elite. This year he also became the Heavyweight Champion of France.

In 1991 he joined the National Institute for the Study of Sports and Physical Fitness (INSEP). There he studied for 5 years while representing France at various international meetings and tournaments collecting various medals and awards. At Almería, Spain, he beat German Kraulenko and loses a decision to Željko Mavrović (Croatia).

The following month, a tournament takes place at Boulogne sur Mer. Christophe beats Raymond Meygerse (Germany) and Igor Andreev (Russia) to gain the silver medal. He loses a decision in the final bout to Arnold Vanderlijde (Netherlands). In Athens, Greece, at the Mediterranean Games of 1991, Christophe again faces Željko Mavrović and loses in a decision. In Ankara, Turkey, he boxes Rebua and Georgi Kandelaki (Geo.) and wins Gold. The day after the final of the 1992 championship, he leaves for Halle, Germany, to take part in the qualifying tournament for the 1992 Olympic Games in Barcelona. This time, he will finish fourth and will not go to Barcelona. Disappointed, he leaves the French team and returns Home to Normandy. After a few months of reflection and soul searching, he joins the ranks of the Semi-professionals and wins two contests.

In 1993, the French national team asked Christophe to rejoin to take part in several important competitions. In the Super Heavyweight division, he wins a bout against American, Allan Cromp, in Marseille. In the Mediterranean Games of 1993 in Béziers, France Christophe won the gold medal in the Super Heavyweight category by beating Egyptian, Ahmed El Sayed and the Italian, Paolo Vidoz.

In February 1994 Djakarta, Indonesia was the location of a qualifying bout for the 1996 Olympic Games. Christophe meets an Australian fighter, the famous Ukrainian Champ Vitali Klitschko and in the finals, the Pakistani Safarash Khan. Christophe won Gold. The following month, a tournament takes place in Venice, Italy. He is, again, the gold medallist of the super heavyweight class.

Then, at the 1994 World Cup of Boxing, in Bangkok, Thailand, he fights the Cuban Roberto Balado, the number One Super Heavyweight. In spite of a beautiful and dominating effort by Christophe, the Cuban wins on points. Subsequently, Christophe requested the national team return him to the Heavyweight class. He then meets the 1993 French title holder and finally wins the Heavyweight title.

France was invited to take part in the 1994 Goodwill Games in St Petersburg, Russia. The first bout pitted Christophe against Cuban, Félix Savón. After a beautiful and well executed fight, the Cuban is declared victorious by a slim two point advantage. Félix Savón, during a TV interview (TV5), would go on to say that Christophe is the only boxer able to beat him. In 1995, Christophe Mendy is elected third best heavyweight boxer in the world by the A.I.B.A (International Association of Amateur Boxing).

=== Highlights ===
(gold) French National Championships (Heavyweight), Berck-sur-Mer, France, 1990:

- 1/8: Defeated Marc Alberola RSC 1
- 1/4: Defeated Lezin Houessou PTS
- 1/2: Defeated Patrice Akam PTS
- Finals: Defeated Jean-Michel Vauquelin PTS

(gold) French National Championships (Heavyweight), Sedan, France, 1991:

- 1/8: Defeated Bruno Choppin RSC 2
- 1/4: Defeated Dominique Delord PTS
- 1/2: Defeated Jean-Michel Vauquelin KO 1
- Finals: Defeated Roberto Leneuve PTS

(silver) Tournoi France (Heavyweight), Boulogne-sur-Mer, France, 1991:

- 1/4: Defeated Raymond Meygerse (Germany) PTS
- 1/2: Defeated Igor Andreyev (Russia) PTS
- Finals: Lost to Arnold Vanderlijde (Netherlands) PTS

Chemistry Cup (Heavyweight), Halle, Germany, 1992:

- 1/16: Lost to Kai Brannkarr (Finland) 7–21

(gold) French National Championships (Heavyweight), Liévin, France, 1992:

- 1/4: Defeated Said Bechari PTS
- 1/2: Defeated Stephane Allouane PTS
- Finals: Defeated Carlos Guerreiro PTS

(silver) Trofeo Italia (Heavyweight), Mestre, Italy, 1993:

- Finals: Lost to Roland Raforme (Seychelles) by walkover

European Championships (Super Heavyweight), Bursa, Turkey, 1993:

- 1/8: Lost to Gytis Juškevičius (Lithuania) 9–15

(gold) Mediterranean Games (Super Heavyweight), Narbonne, France, 1993:

- 1/2: Defeated Paolo Vidoz (Italy) KO 2
- Finals: Defeated Said Ahmed el-Sayed (Egypt) 6–0

(gold) President's Cup (Super Heavyweight) Jakarta, Indonesia, February 1994:

- 1/2: Defeated Vitali Klitschko (Ukraine) PTS
- Finals: Defeated Safarish Khan (Pakistan)

(gold) French National Championships (Super Heavyweight), Saint-Lo, France, 1994:

- 1/2: Defeated Norbert Ollhoff RSC 1
- Finals: Defeated Claude Bevis RSC 3

World Cup (Super Heavyweight), Bangkok, Thailand, 1994:

- 1/8: Lost to Roberto Balado (Cuba) 4–24

(gold) Trofeo Italia (Heavyweight), Mestre, Italy, 1994:

- 1/4: Defeated Lamon Brewster (United States) PTS
- 1/2: Defeated Roland Raforme (Seychelles) RSCI 3
- Finals: Defeated Erik Fuhrmann (Germany) 6–2

Goodwill Games (Heavyweight), Saint Petersburg, Russia, 1994:

- 1/4: Lost to Félix Savón (Cuba) 6–8

(gold) Copenhagen Cup (Heavyweight), Copenhagen, Denmark, 1994:

- 1/4: Defeated Sergey Mochalov (Russia) RSC 3
- 1/2: Defeated Anders Elkjær (Denmark) 17–5
- Finals: Defeated Dmitriy Lenkov (Belarus) by walkover

(bronze) Giraldo Cordova Cardin Tournament (Heavyweight), Matanzas, Cuba, 1995:

- 1/4: Defeated Alexis Echevarria (Cuba) RSC 1
- 1/2: Lost to Félix Savón (Cuba) by walkover

(gold) Trofeo Italia (Heavyweight), Mestre, Italy, 1995:

- Finals: Defeated Jonas Dambrauskas (Lithuania) RET 3

USA–France Duals (Heavyweight), Atlanta, Georgia, 1995:

- Defeated Duwan Blanch (United States) PTS

(bronze) World Championships (Heavyweight), Berlin, Germany, 1995:

- 1/8: Defeated Tao Jiang (China) 16–5
- 1/4: Defeated Wojciech Bartnik (Poland) 7–2
- 1/2: Lost to Félix Savón (Cuba) 6–9

(silver) Vaclav Prochazka Tournament (Heavyweight), Ostrava, Czech Republic, October 1995:

- Finals: Lost to Jan Bezvoda (Czech Republic) 6–8

(silver) Strandzha Cup (Heavyweight), Sofia, Bulgaria, 1996:

- 1/4: Defeated Tamer Erolov (Bulgaria) 6–1
- 1/2: Defeated Georgi Kandelaki (Georgia) RET 2
- Finals: Lost to Félix Savón (Cuba) by walkover

(silver) European Championships (Heavyweight) Vejle, Denmark, 1996:

- 1/16: Defeated Tamer Erolov (Bulgaria) 7–4
- 1/8: Defeated Cathal O'Grady (Ireland) 10–6
- 1/4: Defeated Georgi Kandelaki (Georgia) 7–2
- 1/2: Defeated Kwamena Turkson (Sweden) 7–2
- Finals: Lost to Luan Krasniqi (Germany) 7–8

Summer Olympics (Heavyweight), Atlanta, Georgia, 1996:

- 1/8: Defeated Ovidiu Bali (Romania) RSCH 2
- 1/4: Lost to David Defiagbon (Canada) DQ 3

Mendy finished his amateur career with 88 fights under his belt, 73 wins (31 KOs), 14 losses, 1 draw. While in amateurs, he was defeated four times by Cuban boxing legend Félix Savón. Cubans happened to be the toughest opponents for Mendy (he lost 5 out of 6 match-ups against Cubans.)

== Professional career ==
Although Mendy fought professionally once in 1993 while classified as an amateur, he officially launched his pro career in 1995. He had limited success as a pro, and retired in 2000 after having won 14 (9 KOs,) lost 4 with 2 KO-losses, and 1 draw.

== Professional boxing record ==
19 fights	14 wins	4 losses
By knockout	9	2
By decision	5	2
Draws	1	
