= Boxing at the 1996 Summer Olympics – Heavyweight =

Boxing competitions

Heavyweight boxing at the Games of the XXVI Olympiad
- Venue: Alexander Memorial Coliseum
- Dates: 21 July – 4 August 1996
- Competitors: 24 from 24 nations

Medalists
1st place, gold medalist(s)		Felix Savon	Cuba
2nd place, silver medalist(s)		David Defiagbon	Canada
3rd place, bronze medalist(s)		Nate Jones	United States
3rd place, bronze medalist(s)		Luan Krasniqi	Germany

The Heavyweight class in the boxing at the 1996 Summer Olympics competition was the second-heaviest class at the 1996 Summer Olympics in Atlanta, Georgia. The weight class was open for boxers weighing up to 91 kilograms. The competition in the Alexander Memorial Coliseum started on 1996-07-20 and ended on 1996-08-04.

== Medalists ==
Gold	Felix Savon; Cuba
Silver	David Defiagbon; Canada
Bronze	Nate Jones; United States
Bronze	Luan Krasniqi; Germany

== Results ==
Round of 32
Igor Kshinin (RUS)	17
Amrou Moustafa (EGY)	4
Luan Krasniqi (GER)	12
Ruslan Chagayev (UZB)	4
Cathal O'Grady (IRL)	1:40
Garth Da Silva (NZL)	RSC-1
Sergey Dychkov (BLR)	16
Romāns Kukļins (LAT)	6
Wojciech Bartnik (POL)	14
Lakha Singh (IND)	2
Giorgi Kandelaki (GEO)	RET 3
Thompson Garcia (ECU)	0:00
Young-Sam Ko (KOR)	8
Kwamena Turkson (SWE)	12
Andrey Kurnyavka (KGZ)	3
Felix Savon (CUB)	9

Round of 16
Nate Jones (USA)	RSCI-3
Fola Okesola (GBR)	2:53
Charles Kizza (UGA)	7
Jiang Tao (CHN)	10
Christophe Mendy (FRA)	RSCH-2
Ovidiu Bali (ROM)	0:44
David Defiagbon (CAN)	15
Ahmed Omar (KEN)	4
Igor Kshinin (RUS)	2
Luan Krasniqi (GER)	10
Garth Da Silva (NZL)	8
Serguei Dychkov (BLR)	12
Wojciech Bartnik (POL)	1
Giorgi Kandelaki (GEO)	6
Kwamena Turkson (SWE)	2:29
Felix Savon (CUB)	KO-1

Quarterfinals
Nate Jones (USA)	21
Jiang Tao (CHN)	4
Christophe Mendy (FRA)	1:01
David Defiagbon (CAN)	DQ-3
Luan Krasniqi (GER)	10
Serguei Dychkov (BLR)	5
Giorgi Kandelaki (GEO)	4
Felix Savon (CUB)	20

Semifinals
Nate Jones (USA)	10
David Defiagbon (CAN)	16
Luan Krasniqi (GER)	0
Felix Savon (CUB)	WO-1

Final
David Defiagbon (CAN)	2
Felix Savon (CUB)	20
