= Georgi Kandelaki =

Georgian boxer

Personal information
- Born: April 10, 1974 (age 52) Variani, Georgian SSR, Soviet Union

Boxing career

Boxing record
- Total fights: 24
- Wins: 24
- Win by KO: 18
- Losses: 0
- Draws: 0
Medal record
Men's amateur boxing
Representing CIS
Junior World Championships
Gold medal – first place	1992 Montreal	Heavyweight
Representing Georgia
World Championships
Silver medal – second place	1993 Tampere	Heavyweight
Gold medal – first place	1997 Budapest	Super Heavyweight
World Cup
Bronze medal – third place	1994 Bangkok	Heavyweight
European Championships
Gold medal – first place	1993 Bursa	Heavyweight

Georgi Kandelaki (Georgian: გიორგი კანდელაკი; born 10 April 1974) is a Georgian former boxer and current boxing administrator. He competed in the 1996 Summer Olympics, at the 1997 World Amateur Boxing Championships he became the first Georgian to win a World Championship, and from 2002 to 2003 held the World Boxing Union heavyweight title.

== Early life ==
Kandelaki was born in the village of Variani and was introduced to boxing by his father, Tarash Kandelaki. In 1991, he completed Variani secondary school, and went on to study at the Gori State University Economics Department.

== Amateur career ==
In 1992 Kandelaki won the Junior World Championships in the heavyweight class, and in 1993 he won the European Championships and reached the final of the World Championships, where he lost by default to Félix Savón.

In the 1995 World Championships, he reached the quarter-finals having beaten Friday Ahunanya, and again lost by default to Félix Savón.

Representing Georgia at the 1996 Summer Olympics, he defeated Thompson Garcia and Wojciech Bartnik before losing to Félix Savón in the quarter-finals. In the European Championships the same year, he lost to Christophe Mendy in the quarter-finals.

In 1997, he fought in the super heavyweight class in the World Championships, and defeated Vitali Boot, Petr Horáček, Jean-Francois Bergeron and Sergei Liakhovich to reach the final, where he won the title against Alexis Rubalcaba.

=== Highlights ===
(bronze) Soviet Junior Tournament (81 kg), April 1989:

- (no data available)

(gold) International Junior Tournament (91 kg), Tbilisi, Georgian SSR, December 1990:

- 1/2: Defeated Tomasz Bonin (Poland) RSC 1
- Finals: Defeated Nikolay Pyatakov (RSFSR) by unanimous decision, 5–0

(gold) Ahmet Comert Tournament (91 kg), Istanbul, Turkey, May 1992:

- (no data available)

(gold) Junior World Championships (91 kg), Montreal, Canada, September–October 1992:

- 1/8: Defeated Robert Geer (United States) 7–0
- 1/4: Defeated Ismael Kone (Sweden) 11–1
- 1/2: Defeated Peer Mueller (Germany) 6–4
- Finals: Defeated Stephen Gallinger (Canada) 19–2

(silver) World Championships (91 kg), Tampere, Finland, May 1993:

- 1/8: Defeated Bert Teuchert (Germany) 10–9
- 1/4: Defeated Mikael Höök (Sweden) 7–0
- 1/2: Defeated Arshak Avartakyan (Armenia) 7–2
- Finals: Lost to Félix Savón (Cuba) by walkover

(gold) European Championships (91 kg), Bursa, Turkey, September 1993:

- 1/16: Defeated Peter Saat (Estonia) 8–1
- 1/8: Defeated Fyodor Mishko (Belarus) 9–2
- 1/4: Defeated Fikret Güneş (Turkey) 4–2
- 1/2: Defeated Georgios Stefanopoulos (Greece) 7–4
- Finals: Defeated Don Diego Poeder (Netherlands) 11–2

(bronze) Chemistry Cup (91 kg), Halle, Germany, March 1994:

- 1/2: Lost to Jan Bezvoda (Czech Republic) 1–3

(bronze) World Cup (91 kg), Bangkok, Thailand, June 1994:

- 1/4: Defeated Friday Ahunanya (Nigeria) 6–4
- 1/2: Lost to Félix Savón (Cuba) 4–19

(silver) Chemistry Cup (+91 kg), Halle, Germany, March 1995:

- 1/2: Defeated Timo Hoffmann (Germany) 11–1
- Finals: Lost to Vitali Klitschko (Ukraine) by walkover

World Championships (91 kg), Berlin, Germany, May 1995:

- 1/8: Defeated Jonas Dambrauskas (Lithuania) 4–2
- 1/4: Lost to Félix Savón (Cuba) by walkover

(gold) 100th Anniversary Tournament (91 kg), Moscow, Russia, October 1995:

- Finals: Defeated Sergey Sosnin (Russia) by unanimous decision, 5–0

(bronze) Strandzha Cup (91 kg), Sofia, Bulgaria, February 1996:

- 1/4: Defeated Oleg Belikov (Ukraine) 5–2
- 1/2: Lost to Christophe Mendy (France) RET 2

European Championships (91 kg), Vejle, Denmark, March–April 1996:

- 1/16: Defeated Gioacchino Mocerino (Italy) 10–6
- 1/8: Defeated Sergey Dychkov (Belarus) 7–4
- 1/4: Lost to Christophe Mendy (France) 2–7

Summer Olympics (91 kg), Atlanta, Georgia, July 1996:

- 1/16: Defeated Thompson García (Ecuador) RET 3
- 1/8: Defeated Wojciech Bartnik (Poland) 6–1
- 1/4: Lost to Félix Savón (Cuba) 4–20 (Kandelaki was given a standing eight count at 0:54 of the 3rd rd)

Tammer Tournament (+91 kg), Tampere, Finland, September 1997:

- 1/4: Defeated Rimantas Prišmantas (Lithuania) 3–0
- 1/4: Lost to Patrick Halberg (Denmark) 1–6

(gold) World Championships (+91 kg), Budapest, Hungary, October 1997:

- 1/16: Defeated Vitali Boot (Germany) 4–2 (5 rds)
- 1/8: Defeated Petr Horáček (Czech Republic) RSCI 4
- 1/4: Defeated Jean-François Bergeron (Canada) 7–3 (5 rds)
- 1/2: Defeated Sergey Lyakhovich (Belarus) 5–3 (5 rds)
- Finals: Defeated Alexis Rubalcaba (Cuba) 4–1 (5 rds)

== Professional career ==
In 1998, Kandelaki started boxing as a professional for Panix Promotions. In 2002, he won the World Boxing Union heavyweight title. In 2003, he retired unbeaten because of an eye injury.

== Retirement and later life ==
After his boxing career, Kandelaki founded the Georgian Professional Boxing Association and became its president. He trained boys as boxers in his home village of Variani and other villages. He was mentioned in the book The President, the World Champion and I by Lali Moroshkina.

== Professional boxing record ==
24 fights	24 wins	0 losses
By knockout	18	0

24 Wins (18 knockouts, 6 decisions)
No.	Result	Billed Wgt	Opponent	Opp Wgt	Opp Record	Type	Round, time	Date	Location	Notes
24	Win	238	(Russia) Alexey Osokin	227	11–17–1	TKO	3 (6)	17 Oct 2003	(Georgia (country)) Sports Palace, Tbilisi, Georgia	
23	Win	237½	(Russia) Alexander Vasiliev	223	15–9–1	TKO	12 (12)	21 Dec 2002	Yubileyny Sports Palace, Saint Petersburg, Russia	for vacant WBU heavyweight title
22	Win	?	(United States) Eric French	?	10–24–3	TKO	1 (6)	21 Sep 2002	Circus, Kyiv, Ukraine	
21	Win	240	(United Kingdom) Derek McCafferty	246	2–6–0	RTD	5 (8), 3:00	25 May 2002	Mountbatten Centre, Portsmouth, Hampshire, United Kingdom	
20	Win	236½	(Russia) Alexey Varakin	218½	17–9–2	TKO	1 (8), 2:10	2 Mar 2002	York Hall, Bethnal Green, London, United Kingdom	
19	Win	243¾	(Russia) Alexey Osokin	236	9–13–1	UD	6 (6)	20 Dec 2001	Giant Hall, Casino Conti, Saint Petersburg, Russia	
18	Win	?	(Georgia (country)) Ilia Tlashadze	?	3–0–0	KO	3	23 Oct 2001	(Georgia (country)) Variani, Georgia	
17	Win	233½	(South Africa) Sam Ubokane	226¾	9–1–0	TKO	4 (6)	29 Jan 2001	Bushfield Leisure Centre, Peterborough, Cambridgeshire, United Kingdom	
16	Win	?	(United States) Joey Guy	?	27–3–0	TKO	4 (8)	26 Oct 2000	(Georgia (country)) Sports Palace, Tbilisi, Georgia	
15	Win	231	(United Kingdom) Harry Senior	?	7–8–1	PTS	8 (8)	13 Jul 2000	York Hall, Bethnal Green, London, United Kingdom	
14	Win	225	(United States) Rodney McSwain	218	7–11–0	PTS	6 (6)	29 Apr 2000	The Arena, Wembley, London, United Kingdom	
13	Win	220	(France) Antoine Palatis	227¼	27–10–2	PTS	8 (8)	21 Feb 2000	Elephant & Castle Centre, Southwark, London, United Kingdom	80–73
12	Win	235¾	(United Kingdom) Derek McCafferty	238	2–2–0	PTS	8 (8)	18 Dec 1999	Elephant & Castle Centre, Southwark, London, United Kingdom	80–73
11	Win	228	(United States) Mark Young	242	14–36–1	KO	2 (8)	8 Oct 1999	(Georgia (country)) Sports Palace, Tbilisi, Georgia	
10	Win	224¾	(United States) Kimmuel Odum	220	17–29–1	TKO	1 (8)	21 Aug 1999	(Georgia (country)) Batumi, Georgia	
9	Win	226½	(Bulgaria) Spas Spasov	211	7–6–0	TKO	1 (8), 0:37	15 Jul 1999	Werrington Sports Centre, Peterborough, Cambridgeshire, United Kingdom	
8	Win	225¾	(Ukraine) Yuriy Yelistratov	226¼	19–10–1	KO	1 (6), 1:44	22 Jun 1999	Corn Exchange, Ipswich, Suffolk, United Kingdom	
7	Win	228¾	(Guadeloupe) Emile Ramon	224¾	4–4–0	TKO	1 (6), 2:31	22 May 1999	Maysfield Leisure Centre, Belfast, Northern Ireland, United Kingdom	
6	Win	230½	(Hungary) Laszlo Paszterko	219¼	15–31–4	TKO	2 (6), 0:59	24 Apr 1999	Planet Ice Rink, Peterborough, Cambridgeshire, United Kingdom	
5	Win	231½	(United Kingdom) Johnny Davison	203	0–9–0	TKO	2 (6), 2:09	6 Mar 1999	Elephant & Castle Centre, Southwark, London, United Kingdom	
4	Win	231¾	(Slovakia) Ladislav Husarik	273	5–19–1	PTS	6 (6)	6 Feb 1999	North Bridge Leisure Centre, Halifax, Yorkshire, United Kingdom	60–55
3	Win	231	(Democratic Republic of the Congo) Jean Marie Naandu	201	4–9–0	KO	1 (6), 1:23	12 Dec 1998	Northgate Arena, Chester, Cheshire, United Kingdom	
2	Win	234¾	(United States) Steven Archie	241	debut	TKO	2 (4)	26 Sep 1998	(United States) Mohegan Sun Casino, Uncasville, Connecticut, USA	
1	Win	242½	(United Kingdom) Shane Woollas	232	8–10–0	TKO	2 (4), 2:53	2 Jul 1998	Corn Exchange, Ipswich, Suffolk, United Kingdom	

== Mixed martial arts record ==
Professional record breakdown
0 matches	0 wins	0 losses

Res.	Record	Opponent	Method	Event	Date	Round	Time	Location	Notes
Win	2-2	(Japan) Mitsuya Nagai	KO	RINGS - Mega Battle Tournament 1993: Second Round	November 18, 1993	1	7:19	Tokyo, Japan	
Loss	1–2	(Japan) Yoshihisa Yamamoto	Decision	RINGS - Battle Dimension: Osaka Metropolitan Circuit II	July 13, 1993	5	3:00	Nagoya, Japan	
Win	1-1	(Bulgaria) Vladimir Kravchuk	KO	RINGS - Mega Battle Tournament 1992: Semi-Finals	December 19, 1992	2	1:38	Tokyo, Japan	
Loss	0–1	(Netherlands) Hans Nijman	KO	RINGS - Mega Battle Tournament 1992: First Round	October 29, 1992	4	0:35	Nagoya, Japan	

Preceded by Johnny Nelson; Relinquished	WBU Heavyweight Champion; December 21, 2002 – January 2004; Retired	Succeeded by Matt Skelton
