= Sinan Şamil Sam =

Turkish boxer

Personal information
- Nickname: Bull of the Bosphorus
- Nationality: Turkish; German
- Born: Sinan Şamil Sam; 23 June 1974 Frankfurt, West Germany
- Died: 30 October 2015 (aged 41) Istanbul, Turkey
- Height: 6 ft 3 in (1.91 m)
- Weight: heavyweight

Boxing career
- Reach: 76 in (193.0 cm)

Boxing record
- Total fights: 35
- Wins: 31
- Win by KO: 16
- Losses: 4
- Draws: 0
- No contests: 0
Medal record
Men's amateur boxing
Representing Turkey
Junior World Championships
| Gold medal – first place | 1992 Montreal | Light Heavyweight |
European Amateur Boxing Championships
| Silver medal – second place | 1993 Bursa | Light Heavyweight |
| Bronze medal – third place | 1998 Minsk | Super Heavyweight |
World Championships
| Bronze medal – third place | 1995 Berlin | Heavyweight |
| Gold medal – first place | 1999 Houston | Super Heavyweight |
Goodwill Games
| Bronze medal – third place | 1994 Saint Petersburg | Heavyweight |

Sinan Şamil Sam (23 June 1974 – 30 October 2015) was a Turkish heavyweight professional boxer As a professional boxer, Sam won the EBU, WBC international and WBC Mediterranean titles in the heavyweight division. According to his former managers, Sam died after battling liver and kidney failure.

== Amateur career ==
Sinan Şamil Sam won Turkish Amateur Boxing Championship nine times.

=== Highlights ===
(silver) Junior European Championships (Middleweight), Edinburgh, Scotland, 1992:

- Quarterfinals: Defeated Istvan Kozak (Hungary) KO 1
- Semifinals: Defeated Chris Davies (Wales) 8:7
- Finals: Lost to Vassiliy Jirov (Kazakhstan) 7:11

(gold) Junior World Championships (Light Heavyweight), Montreal, Canada, 1992.

- Preliminaries: Defeated Jay Massie (Canada) 8:2
- Quarterfinals: Defeated Dmitriy Gorbachov (Russia) 14:5
- Semifinals: Defeated Yuriy Dvornikov (Ukraine) 17:6
- Finals: Defeated Alexander Gonzalez (Puerto Rico) 11:1

(gold) 1993 Mediterranean Games (Light Heavyweight), Languedoc-Roussillon, France, 1993.

- Semifinals: Defeated Mohamed Benguesmia (Algeria) on points
- Finals: Defeated Vasilikos Paris (Greece) TKO 1

(silver) European Championships (Light Heavyweight), Bursa, Turkey, 1993.

- Preliminaries: Defeated Kelly Oliver (England) TKO 1
- Quarterfinals: Defeated Ervins Chelmanis (Latvia) 6:1
- Semifinals: Defeated Sven Ottke (Germany) 4:2
- Finals: Lost to Igor Kshinin (Russia) 2:2+

(bronze) World Military Games (Heavyweight), Rome, Italy, 1995:

- Quarterfinals: Defeated Ionas Dambrauskas (Lithuania) 12:1
- Semifinals: Lost to Wladimir Klitschko (Ukraine) 2:12

(bronze) World Championships (Heavyweight), Berlin, Germany, 1995:

- Preliminaries: Defeated Kwamena Turkson (Sweden) 6:4
- Preliminaries: Defeated DaVarryl Williamson (United States) 10:0
- Quarterfinals: Defeated Mustafa Amrou (Egypt) TKO 3
- Semifinals: Lost to Luan Krasniqi (Germany) 3:7

(bronze) European Championships (Super Heavyweight), Minsk, Belarus, 1998.

- Preliminaries: Defeated Mirko Filipović (Croatia) 5:1
- Quarterfinals: Defeated Patrick Halberg (Denmark) 3:0
- Semifinals: Lost to Alexey Lezin (Russia)) 3:9

(gold) World Championships (Super Heavyweight), Houston, Texas, 1999.

- Preliminaries: Defeated Tomasz Bonin (Poland) 8:3
- Quarterfinals: Defeated Audley Harrison (England) 4:3
- Semifinals: Defeated Felix Diachuk (Russia) 10:3
- Finals: Defeated Mukhtarkhan Dildabekov (Kazakhstan) +4:4

== Professional career ==
Sam, known as "Bull of the Bosphorus", turned professional in 2000. He won his first 18 fights, including victories over Przemyslaw Saleta, Danny Williams, and Julius Francis.

In 2003, he suffered his first professional defeat to Juan Carlos Gómez and lost the following fight against Luan Krasniqi.

In 2005, he beat Lawrence Clay Bey to set up a fight with Oleg Maskaev, a fight which he lost on points by unanimous decision. After the loss to Maskaev, he defeated Saul Montana in 2006, but then lost a WBC eliminator to Oliver McCall in June 2007.

After three more victories against limited opponents he fought Paolo Vidoz on July 4, 2008; he won the fight by a majority decision.

== Professional boxing record ==
| 35 fights | 31 wins | 4 losses |
|---|---|---|
| By knockout | 16 | 0 |
| By decision | 15 | 4 |
| By disqualification | 0 | 0 |

| Result | Record | Opponent | Type | Round, time | Date | Location | Notes |
|---|---|---|---|---|---|---|---|
| Win | 31–4 | Paolo Vidoz | MD | 12 | 2008-07-04 | Büyük Anadolu Hotel, Ankara, Turkey | Won EBU heavyweight title Retained WBC Mediterranean heavyweight title |
| Win | 30–4 | Ratko Draskovic | TKO | 3 (12), 1:53 | 2008-03-14 | Zenith – Die Kulturhalle, Munich, Bayern, Germany | Retained WBC Mediterranean heavyweight title. |
| Win | 29–4 | Mazur Ali | PTS | 3 (12), 1:53 | 2008-02-15 | Istanbul, Turkey | Retained WBC Mediterranean heavyweight title. |
| Win | 28–4 | Ivica Perkovic | UD | 3 (12), 1:53 | 2007-10-19 | Estrel Convention Centre, Neukölln, Berlin, Germany | Won WBC Mediterranean heavyweight title. |
| Loss | 27–4 | Oliver McCall | UD | 12 | 2007-06-16 | Atatürk Sport Hall, Ankara, Turkey | Lost WBC International heavyweight title. |
| Win | 27–3 | Bob Mirovic | UD | 3 (12), 1:53 | 2006-11-10 | Alsterdorfer Sporthalle, Hamburg, Germany | Retained WBC International heavyweight title. |
| Win | 26–3 | Saul Montana | UD | 3 (12), 1:53 | 2006-07-29 | König Pilsener Arena, Oberhausen, Nordrhein-Westfalen, Germany | Retained WBC International heavyweight title. |
| Win | 25–3 | George Arias | UD | 3 (12), 1:53 | 2006-04-08 | Ostseehalle, Kiel, Schleswig-Holstein, Germany | Won WBC International heavyweight title. |
| Loss | 24–3 | Oleg Maskaev | UD | 12 | 2005-11-12 | Alsterdorfer Sporthalle, Hamburg, Germany | Lost WBC International heavyweight title. |
| Win | 24–2 | Okello Peter | UD | 3 (12), 1:53 | 2005-06-11 | BigBox, Kempten, Bayern, Germany | Retained WBC International heavyweight title |
| Win | 23–2 | Lawrence Clay Bey | UD | 9 (12), 2:01 | 2005-02-12 | Max-Schmeling-Halle, Prenzlauer Berg, Berlin, Germany | Retained WBC International heavyweight title. |
| Win | 22–2 | Denis Bakhtov | TKO | 10 (12) 0:48 | 2004-11-20 | BigBox, Kempten, Bayern, Germany | Won WBC International heavyweight title. |
| Win | 21–2 | Siarhei Dychkou | TKO | 5 (10), 1:28 | 2004-09-04 | Grugahalle, Essen, Nordrhein-Westfalen, Germany | |
| Win | 20–2 | Doug Liggion | KO | 2 (12), 2:04 | 2004-07-24 | Brandenburg Halle, Frankfurt (Oder), Brandenburg, Germany | |
| Win | 19–2 | Edgars Kalnars | KO | 7 (12), ? | 2004-06-05 | Chemnitz Arena, Chemnitz, Sachsen, Germany | |
| Loss | 18–2 | Luan Krasniqi | MD | (12) | 2004-02-14 | Hanns-Martin-Schleyer-Halle, Stuttgart, Baden-Württemberg, Germany | Lost EBU Heavyweight Title. 115-113, 116-113, 114-114. |
| Loss | 18–1 | Juan Carlos Gómez | UD | 10 | 2003-09-27 | HSBC Arena, Buffalo, New York, United States | |
| Win | 18–0 | Julius Francis | TKO | 12 | 2003-04-26 | Sport and Congress Center, Schwerin, Mecklenburg-Vorpommern, Germany | Retained EBU heavyweight title. |
| Win | 17–0 | Danny Williams | TKO | 8 (12), 2:08 | 2003-02-08 | Estrel Convention Center, Neukölln, Berlin, Germany | Retained EBU heavyweight title. |
| Win | 16–0 | Przemysław Saleta | TKO | 1 (12), 0:45 | 2002-10-12 | Sport and Congress Center, Schwerin, Mecklenburg-Vorpommern, Germany | Won EBU heavyweight title. |
| Win | 15–0 | Roman Bugaj | KO | 2 (10), 2:55 | 2002-07-20 | Westfalenhallen, Dortmund, Germany | |
| Win | 14–0 | Thomas Williams | KO | 2 (10), 1:09 | 2002-03-16 | Hanns-Martin-Schleyer-Halle, Stuttgart, Germany | |
| Win | 13–0 | Chris Isaac | PTS | 3 (6), 3:00 | 2001-12-08 | König Pilsener Arena, Oberhausen, Germany | |
| Win | 12–0 | Henry Kolle Njume | TKO | 1 (6), 1:36 | 2001-11-03 | Hansehalle, Lübeck, Germany | |
| Win | 11–0 | Ratko Draskovic | PTS | 5 (12), 2:53 | 2001-09-29 | Universum Gym, Wandsbek, Hamburg, Germany | |
| Win | 10–0 | Yuriy Yelistratov | PTS | 3 (8), 2:46 | 2001-07-21 | Tivoli Eissporthalle, Aachen, Germany | |
| Win | 9–0 | Stanyslav Tovkachov | TKO | 1 (6) | 2001-06-16 | Kisstadion, Budapest, Hungary | |
| Win | 8–0 | Denis Edwige | TKO | 1 (10) | 2001-05-05 | Volkswagen Halle, Braunschweig, Germany | |
| Win | 7–0 | Willie Chapman | PTS | 4 (6) | 2001-02-10 | Estrel Convention Centre, Neukölln, Berlin, Germany | |
| Win | 6–0 | Bradley Rone | KO | 1 (6) | 2000-12-05 | Universum Gym, Wandsbek, Hamburg, Germany | |
| Win | 5–0 | Vlado Szabo | TKO | 1 (6), 0:54 | 2000-10-14 | Kölnarena, Cologne, Germany | |
| Win | 4–0 | Eduardo Antonio Carranza | PTS | 2 (4), 2:09 | 2000-10-01 | Universum Gym, Wandsbek, Hamburg, Germany | |
| Win | 3–0 | Daniel Jerling | PTS | 1 (6), 2:42 | 2000-06-23 | FTC Stadium, Budapest, Hungary | |
| Win | 2–0 | Alex Kosztopulosz | PTS | 4 (4), 0:54 | 2000-05-06 | Swissôtel, Neuss, Nordrhein-Westfalen, Germany | |
| Win | 1–0 | Frantisek Sumina | KO | 2 (4), 3:00 | 2000-04-15 | Preussag Arena, Hanover, Germany | Professional debut. |

== Television viewership ==
=== Germany ===
| Date | Fight | Viewership (avg.) | Network | Source |
|---|---|---|---|---|
| 26 April 2003 | Sinan Şamil Sam vs. Julius Francis | 2,800,000 | ZDF | |
| 14 February 2004 | Sinan Şamil Sam vs. Luan Krasniqi | 4,330,000 | ZDF | |
| 12 November 2005 | Sinan Şamil Sam vs. Oleg Maskaev | 3,030,000 | Das Erste | |
| | Total viewership | 10,560,000 | | |
