= Tony Thompson (boxer) =

American boxer (born 1971)

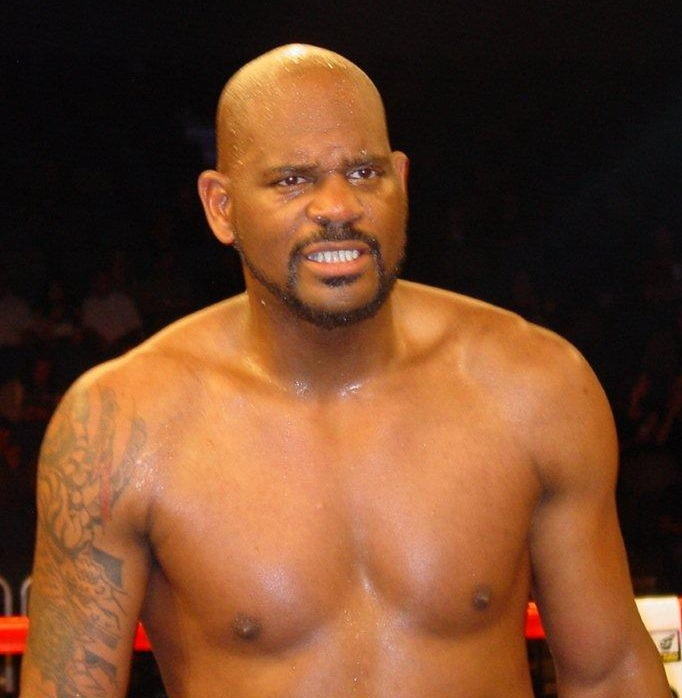
- Thompson in 2011

Personal information
- Nickname: The Tiger
- Born: Anthony Tyrone Thompson; October 18, 1971 (age 55) Washington, D.C., U.S.
- Height: 6 ft 5 in (196 cm)
- Weight: Heavyweight

Boxing career
- Reach: 81 1/2 in (207 cm)
- Stance: Southpaw

Boxing record
- Total fights: 47
- Wins: 40
- Win by KO: 27
- Losses: 7

Anthony Tyrone Thompson (born October 18, 1971) is an American former professional boxer who competed from 2000 to 2016. He challenged twice for the unified heavyweight title in 2008 and 2012.

Described by many observers and fighters as stylistically "awkward", Thompson was ranked by The Ring as the ninth best heavyweight in the world at the end of 2007 (April 2008 issue).

== Early life ==
Tony Thompson was born on October 8, 1971, in Washington, D.C., and has 10 siblings. Both his parents were drug addicts. Tony and his only full-blood brother Keith, who was about 10 months older, grew up in an orphanage before they were taken to the foster home at pre-school age. The brothers spent most of their youth in Southeast, D.C., frequently moving from one relative to another, before members of child and family services took them back to the orphanage. Their mother had visited them there twice before dying of an HIV infection, while the father spent most of their lives in jail. When Tony and Keith were in first grade, they were legally adopted by their paternal grandmother and lived with her family until she died of a heart attack at the age of 54. After their grandmother died, Tony and Keith returned to foster care, then went to live with one of their aunts and her two sons in D.C. public housing. They eventually had a falling out with their aunt, and Tony moved in with his girlfriend Sydnee. He was a father by age 17, and him and Keith never finished high school. According to Keith, the main things that helped them to survive were having each other and law abidance.

The brothers were separated from each other in their 20s, when Keith joined the army. He would frequently send Tony money earned in the military to support him. At the age of 23, Tony Thompson became a police officer, fulfilling what he has called "his childhood dream". He was released from his job after an altercation with a member of the police, which resulted in the mentioned member having his ankle broken. According to Thompson, "[I] picked him off his feet, and threw him out the door". Soon after, Thompson relocated to the Maryland suburbs, and eventually found work as a counselor at the National Children’s Center.

== Amateur career ==
God gives everybody a gift, and one of my gifts is that I read people. I also feel that I have a great gift for inflicting pain on a motherf***er. It’s been like that since I was a kid. Fights that I probably shouldn’t have won, I won. I’m still doing the same thing.

(Tony Thompson, shortly after defeating David Price in what was considered a huge upset)

Thompson took up boxing at the age of 26, after meeting his car insurance agent, Gene Molowsky, who had a boxing gym in the back of his office. When recalling the memory, Gene said: "I saw this big six-foot-six, 250-pound guy. I figured, man — this is the heavyweight I’ve been waiting for." By Thompson's own admission, he believed that starting with boxing at a relatively late age preserved him, because an average person has to let the body develop before getting into physical sports like boxing or american football. Thompson went 13-3 as an amateur before turning pro in 2000.

== Professional career ==
=== 2000–2004: Beginnings ===
Thompson made his professional debut at 28 years old on January 27, 2000, defeating DeShaun Harper by majority decision. He earned $300 for his first fight, which allowed him to cover household electric bill that month. In the early years of his professional career, Thompson was still doing regular 9-to-5 jobs alongside boxing, as Thompson viewed boxing as a source of a supplemental income. He often trained in the gym early in the morning before the start of a full work day. By Thompson's own admission, he soon started viewing boxing as something more than "just a side gig" after piling up a couple of wins: "I won a couple of fights, but I knew I could be a lot better". On May 20, 2001, Thompson faced local hard-hitting prospect Chester Hughes, who had a 9–0 record (6 KOs) coming into the bout. It was the first fight in which Thompson faced someone who was both taller and had longer reach than himself. He won the bout by first-round TKO.

Overall, Thompson had eight fights in 2000 and six in 2001, building up a record of 13 wins and a single decision loss, before facing his first notable opponent, Marion Wilson. Despite having a record of 11 wins, 36 losses and 3 draws, Wilson was recognized for his durability, having never been stopped in his entire career and occasionally pulling upsets, such as wins over Corey Sanders and Paea Wolfgramm or split draw against Ray Mercer. Thompson won the bout by a lopsided unanimous decision, with scores 58–49, 57–49 and 58–49.

On August 31, 2002, Thompson was scheduled to face hard-hitting Ron Guerrero, who was looking to regain his stock after back-to-back losses to Attila Levin and Jeremy Williams. The fight was scheduled for five rounds. Thompson was declared the winner by unanimous decision (UD), with scores 50–45, 49–46 and 50–45. On October 20, 2002, Thompson faced another notable opponent, an experienced journeyman Zuri Lawrence. Lawrence was on a six-fight winning streak, coming off of an upset victory over undefeated Italian prospect Paolo Vidoz. Thompson won the bout by seventh-round TKO.

=== The Thunderbox ===
The back-to-back wins over Guerrero and Lawrence allowed Thompson to participate in Thunderbox Heavyweight Tournament on November 30, 2002, promoted by Cedric Kushner. The tournament consisted of eight participants, which included two-time world heavyweight champion Tim Witherspoon, former and future world heavyweight title challengers Derrick Jefferson, Ray Austin and Jeremy Williams, experienced journeyman Maurice Harris, who had entered the tournament after knocking out future world champion Siarhei Liakhovich, and undefeated, hard-hitting Gerald Nobles. Each boxer, including Thompson, was guaranteed $5,000 and the purse for the tournament winner was $100,000. All bouts took place at Trump Taj Mahal in Atlantic City, New Jersey, and were scheduled for three rounds. The bouts were aired on Eurosport in the UK and on In-Demand pay-per-view in the United States. In the first round, Thompson faced Jeremy Williams. The bout was scored a draw, with Thompson being declared the winner due to landing more punches. In semifinals, Thompson defeated Derrick Jefferson on points, and advanced to the final. Thompson wasn't able to claim the $100,000 prize, as he was soundly beaten by Maurice Harris.

=== 2004-2007: Title Contention ===
On March 27, 2004, Thompson faced undefeated Cuban heavyweight Yanqui Díaz in a fight scheduled for eight rounds. With a record of 8–0 with 6 KOs, Díaz was a highly regarded prospect due to his long and decorated amateur career, with prominent boxing manager Wes Wolfe predicting a bright future for Díaz in the heavyweight division, expecting him to become "a superstar among the Cubans". Thompson handed Díaz his first professional career loss, winning the bout by a wide unanimous decision, with scores 78–72, 77–73 and 79–71. Shortly after, Thompson agreed to face former world title challenger Vaughn Bean on September 11, 2004. It was Thompson's second bout that took place outside of the United States. 30-year old Bean, mostly known for his competitive bouts against Evander Holyfield and Michael Moorer and having only been stopped by Vitali Klitschko, had won 13 of his last 14 fights against mostly lackluster opposition coming into the bout, and was described by some observers as "fringe contender". The bout lasted full ten rounds, with Thompson being declared the winner by unanimous decision. The judges scored the bout 97–93 (twice) and 96–94. At the conclusion of 2004, Thompson was ranked No.7 heavyweight in the world by BoxRec.

After winning another couple of fights, Thompson signed to face Dominick Guinn on March 18, 2006, in San Jose, California. Once described as a "hot prospect" and viewed as one of the top-rising American heavyweight contenders, Guinn was looking to return to the heavyweight title contention after losses to James Toney, Siarhei Liakhovich and Monte Barrett. Many observers viewed Thompson fight as an opportunity for Guinn to follow up on his win over Audley Harrison. The fight was the main event of the card aired live on ESPN2 as part of the Wednesday Night Fights series. It was the first 12-round bout in Thompson's career. The first half of the fight was competitive, with Guinn aggressively coming forward, while Thompson fought behind the jab, landing cleaner punches. By the sixth round, Guinn started showing signs of fatigue. Thompson dominated the second half of the fight, patiently stalking tired Guinn and gradually accumulating the damage, hurting him on several occasions. Ultimately, Thompson was declared the winner by unanimous decision (UD), with scores 118–111, 119–109 and 117–111. Thompson's wife Sydnee later claimed that she had heard Guinn talking to his trainer, Joe Goossen, in the dressing room after the fight, with Guinn saying: "[Tony Thompson]’s nothing like the videos we watched. This guy is good".

A high-profile win over Guinn appeared to have elevated Thompson's stock. After staying inactive for almost eight months (the longest stretch of inactivity in Thompson's career up to that date), he faced Uzbekistani heavyweight prospect Timur Ibragimov on February 16, 2007. Ibragimov was coming off of a decision loss to Calvin Brock, and viewed the Thompson bout as an opportunity to return to the heavyweight title picture. The bout took place at the Playboy Mansion in Beverly Hills, California. Thompson's camp came to the bout unprepared – someone had stolen Thompson's shoes, and he had to borrow a pair of basketball shoes from a Fox Sports Network producer. Thompson dominated Ibragimov, working behind the jab and gradually stepping up his aggression. The bout went the distance, with Thompson being declared the winner by unanimous decision, with scores 97–93 (twice) and 99–91. After the bout, Thompson called out Sultan Ibragimov: "[Sultan Ibragimov] keeps talking about looking for a worthy opponent, but doesn't do anything with it. He wants to fight for the interim title, but avoids fights with worthy opposition". After the win, Thompson entered WBA heavyweight rankings at No.12, and IBF rankings at No.13.

The win over Timur Ibragimov lined him up against popular German boxer Luan Krasniqi in a WBO world heavyweight title eliminator on July 14, 2007. Krasniqi, who was 36 years old coming into the bout, was looking to return to the heavyweight title contention after a loss to Lamon Brewster, with German media expecting him to "fulfill his destiny" and become only the second world heavyweight champion from Germany after Max Schmeling. The fight took place at Color Line Arena in Hamburg, Germany, and was aired on ZDF. This was the first Thompson's bout that took place outside of North America. Thompson appeared to have the upper hand from the opening bell, frequently having Krasniqi pressed against the ropes and going back-and-forth between combinations to the head and body. In the third round, Thompson fractured Krasniqi's ribs. Inbetween the fourth and fifth rounds, the referee warned Krasniqi that he would stop the fight if Krasniqi continued absorbing punishment without firing back. Thompson continued his assault on Krasniqi in the fifth, prompting the referee to stop the fight. Krasniqi later described the fight as "the darkest moment of his career": "I'm still ashamed for what happened that night. I still can't explain it. I was stumbling around like I was drunk. My failure made [Tony Thompson] a star."

After winning the WBO world heavyweight title eliminator, Thompson was appointed the mandatory position in the organization's rankings, thus setting up a bout with then-WBO world heavyweight champion Sultan Ibragimov. The mandatory fight was delayed twice due to a scheduled unification showdown – first between Ibragimov and WBA world champion Ruslan Chagaev, which was ultimately cancelled, then after an agreement was reached between Ibragimov and then-IBF world champion Wladimir Klitschko. Thompson agreed for a stay-busy bout on September 27, 2007, against Cliff Couser, who was coming off of an upset second-round TKO win over Monte Barrett. Thompson defeated Couser by second-round technical knockout. At the conclusion of 2008, Thompson entered The Ring heavyweight rankings at No.9 and was ranked No.5 heavyweight by BoxRec.

=== 2008: Thompson vs. Wladimir Klitschko ===
Thompson finally received a shot at the world heavyweight championship when he signed to face the newly crowned WBO champion Wladimir Klitschko on July 12, 2008, in a fight where Klitschko's IBF world heavyweight title was also on the line. In the build-up to the fight, Klitschko praised Thompson for his defensive abilities, while Klitschko's trainer Emmanuel Steward described Thompson as "one of the most difficult fights we will have". In the pre-fight interview, Thompson promised that he wouldn't run away from Klitschko, and would fight him toe-to-toe. Many observes expected Klitschko to win by TKO in the second half of the fight, before the fighters would enter the championship rounds. The fight took place at the Color Line Arena in Hamburg, Germany, the same venue where Thompson had defeated Luan Krasniqi in a title eliminator almost a year prior. Coming into the fight, Thompson was a 7-to-1 underdog. Thompson weighed in at 247.5 pounds, 6.5 lbs heavier than Klitschko.

The opening rounds were tentative, with Klitschko seemingly struggling with Thompson's awkward southpaw style. All three judges gave the first round to Thompson. In the second round, both fighters suffered a cut above the right eye after an accidental headbutt. Klitschko's eye began to swell after Thompson caught him with the right hook in the fifth round. After the sixth round, however, Klitschko appeared to have established his dominance in the ring, hurting Thompson with several straight right hands. After the seventh round, both fighter started showing signs of fatigue. In the tenth round, Thompson fell to the canvas during a clinch. It appeared as if Thompson fell down mostly due to being tired rather than being pushed by Klitschko. In the middle of the eleventh, Thompson was caught with the straight right hand which he did not see coming, falling to the canvas again, with the referee starting the count this time. Thompson beat the count but was unsteady on his feet, prompting the referee to stop the fight. At the time of the stoppage, Thompson was trailing on the scorecards, with scores 92–98 (twice) and 91–99.

Despite the loss, Thompson was praised for making a solid account of himself, managing to land some punches on the dominant champion, who had seldom been hit clean by any of his opponents by that point. In the post-fight interview, Klitschko admitted that the fight turned out to be tougher than expected: "It is not so easy to defend all the titles and it has been a while since I last had a black eye so today I really look like a boxer. I did not expect the victory to come that hard." After the fight, Thompson expressed disappointment with the final outcome of the fight: "I was fatigued, I thought he was fatigued too. He did what a great champion did, he took advantage when I was vulnerable. The only thing that hurts on me is my heart – for losing." He reportedly earned $500,000 for the fight.

=== 2009–2011: resurgence ===
Thompson stayed in Germany after receiving an offer to be a sparring partner for Vitali Klitschko in his preparation against Juan Carlos Gomez, and agreeing to face local journeyman Adnan Serin on the undercard of Klitschko vs. Gomez. Thompson defeated Serin by fifth-round TKO. Thompson then agreed to face Chazz Witherspoon on December 5, 2009, at the Boardwalk Hall in Atlantic City. Coming into the bout, 28-year old Witherspoon had 26–1 record (18 KOs), with his only defeat being a third-round DQ loss to Chris Arreola. The fight was aired live on HBO on the undercard of the fight between Paul Williams and Sergio Martínez. Thompson dominated Witherspoon from the opening bell, ultimately winning by TKO after staggering Witherspoon with the right hand in round nine and following up with a barrage of unanswered punches, prompting the referee to waive it off.

On April 16, 2010, Thompson faced former WBA world heavyweight title challenger Owen Beck, who was coming off of a 10th-round TKO loss to then-unbeaten Manuel Charr. The bout took place at The New Daisy Theatre in Memphis, Tennessee, after Beck's licence was revoked by several other commissions due to issues with his eyes, and was aired on ESPN2 as part of the Friday Night Fights series. Thompson knocked Beck down late in the first round after landing a right hand behind the ear, and proceeded to hurt Beck several times in the fight before Beck's corner threw in the towel in the fourth round, preventing battered and bruised Beck from continuing absorbing more punishment.

Following this win, Thompson stayed inactive for almost seven months due to shoulder injury before returning to the ring on November 20, facing an American journeyman Paul Marinaccio on the undercard of the rematch between Paul Williams and Sergio Martinez. During his preparation, Thompson was one of the main sparring partners for then-WBA world heavyweight champion David Haye, who was training for his title defense against Audley Harrison. For the fight, Marinaccio had lost 17 pounds and weighed in at 228 lb, his lightest since 2005. Thompson made a quick work of Marinaccio, ultimately stopping him in the fourth round. Following that, Thompson, who was ranked No.7 by IBF, reached agreements to face No.6 ranked Maurice Harris in an IBF world heavyweight title eliminator for the No.2 spot. The fight was supposed to open an ESPN2 Friday Night Fights telecast headlined by Josesito Lopez vs Steve Upsher Chambers but was moved to the main event after Lopez pulled out due to injury. For the fight, Thompson weighed in at 255.5 lbs, the second heaviest in his career up to that date. Thompson defeated Harris by third-round TKO, moving to the No.2 IBF contendership spot. After the fight, Harris filed an official complaint against Thompson, claiming that he was hit with more than 20 illegal rabbit punches in the second and third rounds. Harris complained about his equilibrium was off after he was floored in the second round by a right hook that, according to Harris, landed behind the head. The replay, however, showed no signs of rabbit punching in the right hook that sent Harris down.

Thompson was then scheduled to face Eddie Chambers on 28 October 2011 in a bout televised by Showtime, for what would have been a final eliminator for IBF world heavyweight title. However, the fight was cancelled after Chambers had to pull out due to spinal injury. After the withdrawal of Chambers, the No.1 contendership spot became vacant, and Thompson, who was ranked No.2, was nominated the mandatory IBF challenger. At the conclusion of 2011, BoxRec ranked Thompson as the 8th best heavyweight in the world.

=== 2012: Thompson vs. Wladimir Klitschko II ===
On 4 March 2012, then-unified world heavyweight champion Wladimir Klitschko stated that he would fight Thompson in a rematch from their first fight in 2008. At the time, he stated that the newly opened Barclays Arena in New York were interested in showcasing a Klitschko brother. A purse bid was set by the IBF, where Klitschko, upon request, would receive 85% of the purse split, meaning Thompson would only receive 15% compared to the usual 25%. The fight was confirmed to take place at the Stade de Suisse in Berne, Switzerland on 7 July. "So far I've always been better in rematches. However, I must not take this lightly as Thompson knows me better than any other fighter", Klitschko said in the build-up to the fight, "Thompson is a strong and difficult boxer-southpaw. [...] He has good technique, and he was one [of] the most difficult fighters I've ever faced." "I've been waiting for this rematch for so long", Thompson said during one of pre-fight press-conferences, "In Berne, I'm gonna finish what I've started 4 years ago - knock Klitschko out and take the belts back to the United States". Thompson weighed in at 244.75, dropping 10.75 lbs from his bout with Harris, while Klitschko weighed in at 249, the heaviest in his entire career.

In the first round, both fighters were cautious, patiently studying each other. Klitschko became more dominant in the second, working mostly with his jab. Thompson unsuccessfully went for the attack and in the process fell to the canvas. The referee did not rule it a knockdown. In the third round, Thompson hurt Klitschko for the first time in the fight with a counter left hand but was still being outboxed by Klitschko. In the fifth round, Thompson was trapped in the corner and caught with a straight right hand, falling to the canvas to the count. Thompson beat the count but looked hurt, however he was able to survive that round. Klitschko continued his assault in the sixth, sending Thompson down again with a flurry of shots. Thompson got up but had to hold on to the ropes in order to stand, which prompted the referee to stop the fight, declaring Klitschko the winner by sixth-round TKO. "From the beginning, I had no doubt that I would successfully defend the titles. But it was hard to time an accurate shot. Thompson was elusive, he didn't lose an eye contact at any moment in the fight and was able to see most of my punches", Klitschko said in a post-fight interview. CompuBox stats showed Klitschko landed 51 of 121 total punches thrown (42%) and Thompson landed only 25 of 183 thrown (14%).

=== 2013: Thompson vs. Price, Pulev ===
In December 2012, it was announced that Thompson would fight then-highly regarded British heavyweight, ESPN's Prospect of the Year David Price (15–0, 13 KOs) at the Echo Arena in Liverpool on 23 February 2013. This was regarded as a big step up for Price and a win would see him likely earn a future world title fight. Price's promoter Frank Maloney said, "This is the right fight at the right time for David and one where a win will propel him even higher. Thompson still has ambition and I am certain that he will come to win and score a major upset." Thompson was a heavy underdog among bookmakers and many were intrigued to see how David Price would fare against a common Wladimir Klitschko opponent. The bout was televised in the UK on Boxnation.

Thompson gave David Price his first professional career loss, scoring a second-round technical knockout in front of 6,000 fans in attendance. Thompson had been cautious and tentative throughout and it looked as though he was soon to be taken over and stopped, however to the crowd's shock Thompson threw a counter right hand that hit Price awkwardly behind the ear, sending him to the canvas. Price beat the count but the location of the punch behind the ear damaged his equilibrium and the bout was waved off. Thompson had scored what was regarded the heavyweight upset of the year at that point. After the post-fight press conference, Price's 60 year old promoter Frank Maloney collapsed. He was attended to by paramedics, given oxygen and then taken to hospital for further check-up. Maloney previously suffered a heart attack in 2009 after his fighter Darren Sutherland died.

Frank Maloney claimed there was a rematch clause in place, but they wouldn't ask for it straight away and let Thompson enjoy his win. Upon hearing about the rematch clause, Thompson replied, "They can clause all the hell they want. I'm not coming back. They vastly underpaid me for this fight and I just took it for the opportunity. I've now created that opportunity and if they want to fight me again, then first of all they've got to come to my side of the Atlantic and then they've got to pay me what I'm worth." However, on 27 March, a rematch was confirmed to take place again at the Echo Arena on 6 July. According to Maloney, although there was a rematch clause in place, the fight was still hard to make as rival promotions were also interested in Thompson. David Price revealed that former undisputed world heavyweight champion Lennox Lewis advised him to take the rematch. Thompson weighed 259 pounds, 3 pounds lighter than the first fight and Price came in at 250 pounds. The fight was aired live in the United States on Wealth TV.

Thompson suffered a heavy knockdown in round 2 after a powerful right hook, having attested afterwards that it was the hardest he'd ever been hit in his life. Both men traded shots in an exciting encounter, with Thompson sapping Price's energy with precise body shots. The body work seemingly paid off as Price appeared to have collapsed physically in the fifth round, at one point turning his back to Thompson after Thompson staggered him with a barrage of shots and retreating to the corner where the referee started a count. Price motioned as though he had given up and the referee stopped the fight, awarding Thompson a 5th-round TKO victory. Shortly after the fight it was announced that Thompson had failed a drug test and was subsequently banned by the British Boxing Board of Control for 18 months. Thompson's team was furious over the failed drug test and in a statement they claimed Thompson was prescribed high blood pressure medication and it was disclosed prior to the fight with Price.

In August, Thompson faced undefeated contender Kubrat Pulev in another IBF title eliminator, in an attempt to secure a third fight with Wladimir Klitschko. After a competitive first seven rounds, Thompson faded down the stretch and allowed Pulev to take advantage by out-boxing him, and landing the more cleaner and effective shots. Following this setback, at age 41, Thompson's career at the top level was once again in doubt. After the bout, Thompson once again tested positive for the same substance found in his system during the Price rematch, receiving a 12-month ban from the Austrian Boxing Federation.

=== 2014–2015: Thompson vs. Solis, Takam ===
In March 2014, Thompson resurrected his career again after defeating 2004 Olympic gold medalist and former heavyweight title challenger Odlanier Solís by split decision. In the fight, Thompson threw 1,092 punches, breaking David Bostice's CompuBox record for most punches thrown by an individual in a heavyweight fight. He then went on to lose a fight via decision to Carlos Takam later that year. Thompson fought a rematch against Solís in February 2015, forcing him to retire in his corner in the eighth round.

== Professional boxing record ==
47 fights	40 wins	7 losses
By knockout	27	3
By decision	12	4
By disqualification	1	0

No.	Result	Record	Opponent	Type	Round, time	Date	Location	Notes
47	Loss	40–7	Luis Ortiz	KO	6 (12), 2:29	Mar 5, 2016	D.C. Armory, Washington, D.C., U.S.	
46	Loss	40–6	Malik Scott	UD	10	Oct 30, 2015	The Venue at UCF, Orlando, Florida, U.S.	
45	Win	40–5	Odlanier Solís	RTD	9 (12), 3:00	Feb 27, 2015	Gloria Sports Arena, Antalya, Turkey	Won vacant WBC Continental Americas heavyweight title
44	Loss	39–5	Carlos Takam	UD	12	Jun 6, 2014	Palais des sports Marcel-Cerdan, Levallois-Perret, France	For vacant WBC Silver heavyweight title
43	Win	39–4	Odlanier Solís	SD	12	Mar 22, 2014	Atatürk Spor Salonu, Tekirdağ, Turkey	Won vacant WBC International heavyweight title
42	Loss	38–4	Kubrat Pulev	UD	12	Aug 24, 2013	Sport- und Kongresshalle, Schwerin, Germany	For IBF International heavyweight title
41	Win	38–3	David Price	TKO	5 (12), 1:55	Jul 6, 2013	Echo Arena, Liverpool, England	
40	Win	37–3	David Price	TKO	2 (12), 2:17	Feb 23, 2013	Echo Arena, Liverpool, England	
39	Loss	36–3	Wladimir Klitschko	TKO	6 (12), 2:56	Jul 7, 2012	Stade de Suisse Wankdorf, Bern, Switzerland	For WBA (Super), IBF, WBO, IBO, and The Ring heavyweight titles
38	Win	36–2	Maurice Harris	TKO	3 (12), 1:51	May 26, 2011	Events Center, Reno, Nevada, U.S.	
37	Win	35–2	Paul Marinaccio	TKO	4 (10), 2:02	Nov 20, 2010	Boardwalk Hall, Atlantic City, New Jersey, U.S.	
36	Win	34–2	Owen Beck	TKO	4 (10), 2:50	Apr 16, 2010	The New Daisy Theatre, Memphis, Tennessee, U.S.	
35	Win	33–2	Chazz Witherspoon	TKO	9 (10), 2:13	Dec 5, 2009	Boardwalk Hall, Atlantic City, New Jersey, U.S.	
34	Win	32–2	Adnan Serin	TKO	5 (10), 2:55	Mar 21, 2009	Hanns-Martin-Schleyer-Halle, Stuttgart, Germany	
33	Loss	31–2	Wladimir Klitschko	KO	11 (12), 1:38	Jul 12, 2008	Color Line Arena, Hamburg, Germany	For IBF, WBO, and IBO heavyweight titles
32	Win	31–1	Cliff Couser	TKO	2 (10), 1:49	Sep 27, 2007	Tachi Palace Hotel & Casino, Lemoore, California, U.S.	
31	Win	30–1	Luan Krasniqi	TKO	5 (12), 2:39	Jul 14, 2007	Color Line Arena, Hamburg, Germany	Won WBO Inter-Continental heavyweight title
30	Win	29–1	Timur Ibragimov	UD	10	Feb 16, 2007	Playboy Mansion, Beverly Hills, California, U.S.	Retained WBC Continental Americas heavyweight title
29	Win	28–1	Dominick Guinn	UD	12	Jun 28, 2006	HP Pavilion, San Jose, California, U.S.	Won vacant WBC Continental Americas heavyweight title
28	Win	27–1	Maurice Wheeler	TKO	4 (8), 2:10	Mar 18, 2006	Boardwalk Hall, Atlantic City, New Jersey, U.S.	
27	Win	26–1	Brandon Cabell	TKO	4 (10), 2:41	Jan 26, 2006	Michael's Eighth Avenue, Glen Burnie, Maryland, U.S.	Won vacant Maryland heavyweight title
26	Win	25–1	Willie Perryman	KO	5 (8)	Sep 30, 2005	Cache Creek Casino Resort, Brooks, California, U.S.	
25	Win	24–1	Vaughn Bean	UD	10	Sep 11, 2004	Montreal Casino, Montreal, Quebec Canada	
24	Win	23–1	Agustin Corpus	TKO	2 (8), 2:04	Jun 19, 2004	City Center Pavilion, Reno, Nevada, U.S.	
23	Win	22–1	Yanqui Díaz	UD	8	Mar 27, 2004	Caesars Tahoe, Stateline, Nevada, U.S.	
22	Win	21–1	Joe Lenhart	TKO	1 (4), 2:32	Mar 6, 2004	Turning Stone Casino, Verona, New York, U.S.	
21	Win	20–1	Onebo Maxime	TKO	2 (6), 1:17	Dec 9, 2003	National Guard Armory, Pikesville, Maryland, U.S.	
20	Win	19–1	Gilbert Martinez	TKO	6 (10), 2:52	Aug 22, 2003	Las Vegas Hilton, Winchester, Nevada, U.S.	
19	Win	18–1	James Gaines	TKO	8 (8)	Mar 7, 2003	Memorial Arena, Niagara Falls, Ontario, Canada	
18	Win	17–1	Zuri Lawrence	TKO	7 (10), 1:06	Oct 20, 2002	Emerald Queen Casino, Tacoma, Washington, U.S.	
17	Win	16–1	Ron Guerrero	UD	5	Aug 31, 2002	Strawberry Field, Bridgehampton, New York, U.S.	
16	Win	15–1	Frankie Hines	TKO	1	Jul 20, 2002	National Guard Armory, Leesburg, Virginia, U.S.	
15	Win	14–1	Marion Wilson	UD	6	Feb 2, 2002	Ramada Inn, New Carrollton, Maryland, U.S.	
14	Win	13–1	Lincoln Luke	TKO	2	Nov 11, 2001	Belterra Casino Resort & Spa, Elizabeth, Indiana, U.S.	
13	Win	12–1	Jeremiah Johnson	KO	1 (6), 0:32	Jul 8, 2001	Texas Station, North Las Vegas, Nevada, U.S.	
12	Win	11–1	Scott Jones	UD	6	Jun 21, 2001	Michael's Eighth Avenue, Glen Burnie, Maryland, U.S.	
11	Win	10–1	Chester Hughes	TKO	1 (8), 2:47	May 20, 2001	Belterra Casino Resort & Spa, Elizabeth, Indiana, U.S.	
10	Win	9–1	James Johnson	DQ	3	Mar 17, 2001	Silver Star Casino, Philadelphia, Mississippi, U.S.	
9	Win	8–1	Lee Alhassan	TKO	1 (6)	Jan 27, 2001	Bally's Park Place, Atlantic City, New Jersey, U.S.	
8	Win	7–1	Derek Amos	TKO	5	Oct 19, 2000	Zembo Shrine Building, Harrisburg, Pennsylvania, U.S.	
7	Win	6–1	Dana Dunston	KO	3 (6), 2:07	Sep 21, 2000	Michael's Eighth Avenue, Glen Burnie, Maryland, U.S.	
6	Win	5–1	Eric Kea	TKO	1 (4), 1:44	Aug 26, 2000	Show Place Arena, Upper Marlboro, Maryland, U.S.	
5	Loss	4–1	Eric Kirkland	UD	6	Jul 7, 2000	Cape Cod Melody Tent, Hyannis, Massachusetts, U.S.	
4	Win	4–0	Maurice Gray	UD	6	Jun 22, 2000	Michael's Eighth Avenue, Glen Burnie, Maryland, U.S.	
3	Win	3–0	Scott Jones	UD	4	May 11, 2000	Michael's Eighth Avenue, Glen Burnie, Maryland, U.S.	
2	Win	2–0	Robert Anderson	UD	4	Mar 1, 2000	Martin's West, Woodlawn, Maryland, U.S.	
1	Win	1–0	DeShaun Harper	MD	4	Jan 27, 2000	Michael's Eighth Avenue, Glen Burnie, Maryland, U.S.	

Sporting positions
Regional boxing titles
Vacant Title last held by Hasim Rahman	Maryland heavyweight champion January 26, 2006 – ? Vacated	Vacant
Vacant Title last held by Donnell Holmes	WBC Continental Americas heavyweight champion June 28, 2006 – July 2007; Vacated	Vacant Title next held by Chris Arreola
Preceded by Luan Krasniqi	WBO Inter-Continental heavyweight champion July 14, 2007 – September 2007; Vacated	Vacant Title next held by Alexander Dimitrenko
Vacant Title last held by Chris Arreola	WBC International heavyweight champion March 22, 2014 – May 2014; Vacated	Vacant Title next held by Alexander Povetkin
Vacant Title last held by Deontay Wilder	WBC Continental Americas heavyweight champion February 27, 2015 – October 2015; Vacated	Vacant Title next held by Dominic Breazeale
