= Iakob Gogebashvili =

Georgian writer and journalist

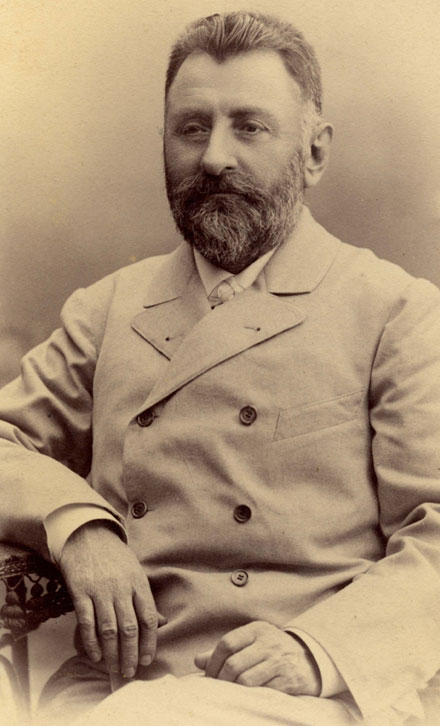
- Born: October 27, 1840
- Died: June 1, 1912 (Age 71)
- Resting place: Mtatsminda Pantheon, Tbilisi
- Occupations: poet, novelist, humanist, publisher, journalist, educator

Iakob Gogebashvili (Georgian: იაკობ გოგებაშვილი) (October 27, 1840 – June 1, 1912) was a Georgian educator, children’s writer and journalist, considered to be the founder of the scientific pedagogy in Georgia. Through his masterly compiled children's primer, Mother Language (დედა ენა), which in a modified form serves to this day as a text book in Georgian schools, every Georgian since 1880 has learnt to read and write in their native language.

== Biography ==
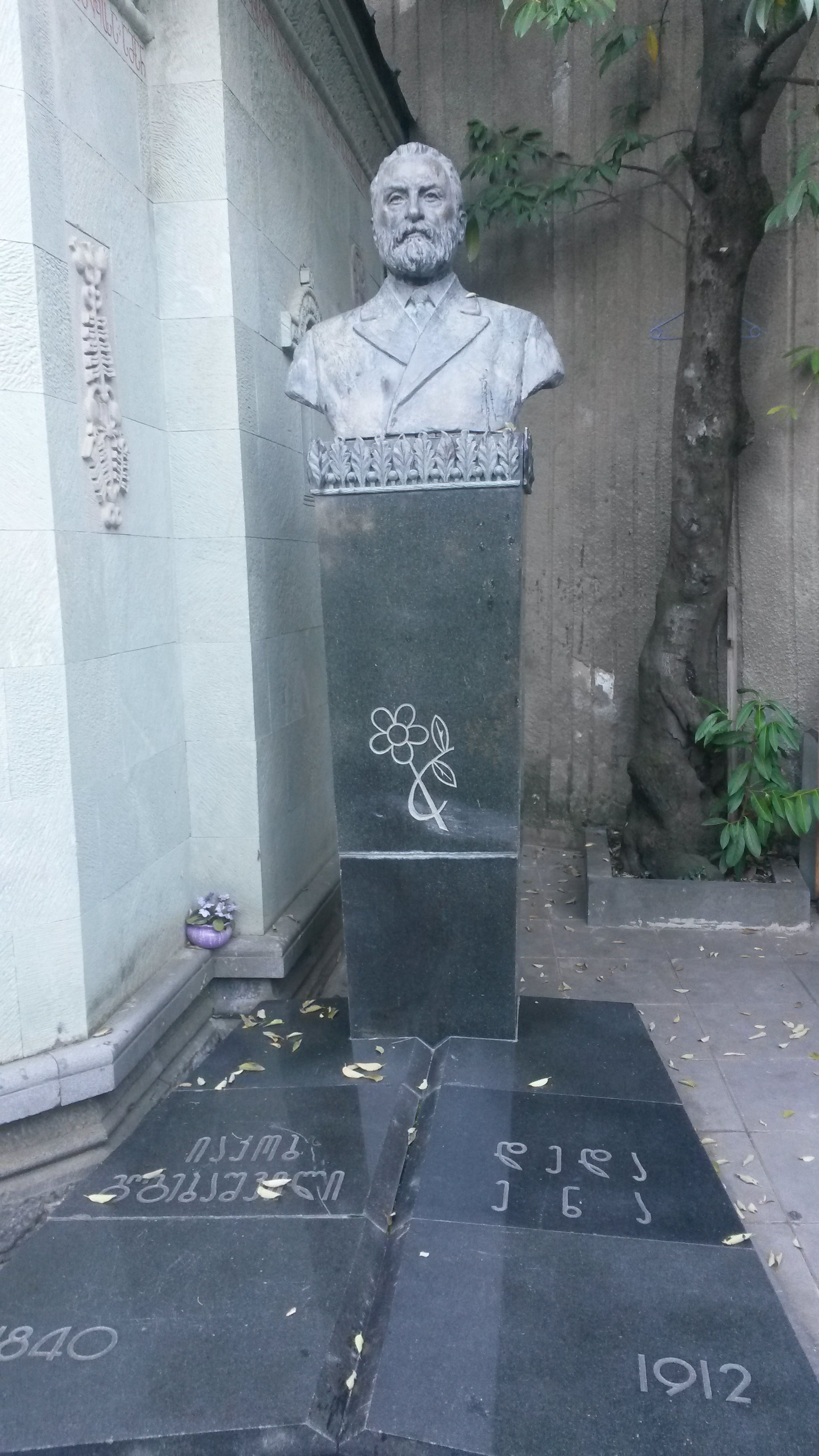
Grave of Gogebashvili.

Iakob Gogebashvili was born in village Variani near Gori, Georgia (then part of Imperial Russia) to a poor family of a priest Simon Gogebashvili. He studied at Gori seminary and Tbilisi before entering a theological academy in Kiev in 1861. Simultaneously, he attended the lectures in natural sciences at the Kiev University where he became familiar with the political ideas of Russian enlighteners such as Herzen, Belinsky and Chernyshevsky. Yet, unlike many of his contemporary Georgian intellectuals, he was affected less by the Russian radicals than by a Christian background in the seminaries of Gori and Tiflis. Returning to Georgia in 1863, he taught arithmetic and geography at the Tbilisi Seminary and later became its inspector. Gogebashvili’s apartment, frequented by the seminarian students, soon became a haven for forbidden discussions of art and politics. Consequently, he was dismissed on the orders from the Holy Synod in St. Petersburg in 1874.

From then on, Gogebashvili became a free-lance and devoted his energy to promoting education among his countrymen. In 1879, he helped found the Society for the Spreading of Literacy Among Georgians through which he channeled his efforts aimed at countering Russification, especially in the school system, and at reversing the erosion of Georgian language whose status he compared with that of a "wretched foundling, deprived of all care and protection." Gogebashvili quickly gained influence among the constellation of intellectuals around Prince Ilia Chavchavadze who spearheaded the movement for Georgian national revival until his assassination in 1907.

Gogebashvili’s most influential work, Mother Language (დედა ენა), an introduction to Georgian for children, was first published in 1876. Moving from alphabet to literary texts, with a number of encyclopedic passages, it has gone through countless editions to become the pattern over the next hundred years for primers not only in Georgian, but in the several new literary languages of the Caucasus. Another of his major works is The Door to Nature (ბუნების კარი, 1868), which builds fable and introduction to natural sciences into a miniature children’s encyclopedia. Gogebashvili also authored a number of fairy stories and historical fiction for children as well as several journalistic articles in defense of Georgian culture and identity. Gogebashvili's method of compiling a children's primer was inscribed on the Intangible Cultural Heritage of Georgia registry in 2013.
