= Garth da Silva =

New Zealand boxer (born 1973)

Medal record

Men's boxing

Representing New Zealand

Commonwealth Games
Bronze medal – third place	Kuala Lumpur 1998	Heavyweight

Garth John da Silva (born 28 December 1973 in Wellington, New Zealand) is a boxer from New Zealand, who competed at the 1996 Summer Olympics in Atlanta, Georgia. There he won his first round in the Heavyweight (-91 kg) division against Cathel O'Grady of Ireland, before losing to Serguei Dychkov of Belarus. In 1998 he won the bronze medal at the 1998 Commonwealth Games in Kuala Lumpur. He is the son of wrestler John da Silva.
