= Nate Jones (boxer) =

American boxer (born 1972)

Personal information
- Born: Nathaniel Henry Jones; August 18, 1972 (age 54) Chicago, Illinois
Medal record
Men's boxing
Representing United States
Olympic Games
Bronze medal – third place	1996 Atlanta	Heavyweight

Nathaniel Henry "Nate" Jones (born August 18, 1972) is an American former Olympic and professional boxer. Nicknamed "The Snake", Jones won the National Golden Gloves 1994 and 1995 and the Heavyweight bronze medal at the 1996 Summer Olympics.

== Amateur career ==
- Winner of the Heavyweight bronze medal representing the United States at the 1996 Olympics in Atlanta. His results were:
  - 1st round bye
  - Defeated Fola Okesola (Great Britain) RSC 3 (2:53)
  - Defeated Jiang Tao (China) 21-4
  - Lost to David Defiagbon (Canada) 10-16
- National Golden Gloves Heavyweight Champion (1994, 1995)

== Professional career ==
Jones began his career undefeated in 17 fights over opponents. In his first test against Friday Ahunanya, Jones lost a split decision. After two victories over limited foes, Jones stepped up against future titlist Lamon Brewster, who defeated Jones by TKO in round 3. Shortly after the loss, Jones retired after doctors diagnosed him with diminished reflexes and speech.

== Professional record ==
18 Wins (9 knockouts, 9 decisions), 2 Losses (1 knockout, 1 decision), 1 Draw
Result	Record	Opponent	Type	Round	Date	Location	Notes
Loss	25-2	(United States) Lamon Brewster	TKO	3	2002-02-02	Reading, Pennsylvania, United States	WBO NABO Heavyweight Title. Referee stopped the bout at 1:10 of the third round.
Win	8-2	(United States) Drexie James	TKO	4	2001-12-15	Mashantucket, Connecticut, United States	
Win	5-14	(United States) Antonio Colbert	UD	6	2001-08-24	Rosemont, Illinois, United States	
Loss	14-0	(Nigeria) Friday Ahunanya	SD	12	2001-03-03	Las Vegas, Nevada, United States	NABA Heavyweight Title. 112-115, 113-114, 114-113.
Win	21-8-2	(United States) Sam Hampton	TKO	2	2000-11-28	Las Vegas, Nevada, United States	NABA Heavyweight Title.
Win	19-6-1	(United States) Derrick Banks	UD	12	2000-09-16	Las Vegas, Nevada, United States	
Win	17-9	(United States) Anthony Willis	UD	10	2000-05-25	Tunica, Mississippi, United States	99-92, 98-92, 99-91.
Win	11-7	(United States) Matt Green	KO	1	2000-02-29	Las Vegas, Nevada, United States	Green knocked out at 2:35 of the first round.
Win	9-7	(United States) Sedreck Fields	UD	8	1999-12-18	Tunica, Mississippi, United States	
Win	10-17-7	(United States) Wesley Martin	UD	8	1999-07-24	Las Vegas, Nevada, United States	79-73, 78-74, 78-74.
Win	7-13	(United States) Bryant Smith	KO	1	1999-03-13	(New York (state)) New York City, United States	
Win	2-1	(United States) Joseph Vegas	UD	6	1998-12-18	Fort Lauderdale, Florida, United States	
Win	4-10	(United States) Anthony Moore	UD	6	1998-11-13	Las Vegas, Nevada, United States	60-54, 60-54, 60-54.
Win	2-1	(United States) Brian Chitwood	KO	1	1998-09-19	(Georgia (U.S. state)) Atlanta, Georgia, United States	
Draw	11-18-3	(United States) John Kiser	MD	8	1998-05-29	Las Vegas, Nevada, United States	
Win	0-3	(United States) David Ballanger	KO	1	1998-04-10	Rosemont, Illinois, United States	Ballanger knocked out at 2:01 of the first round.
Win	0-4	(United States) Wilbert Young	TKO	1	1998-01-31	Tampa, Florida, United States	Referee stopped the bout at 2:11 of the first round.
Win	0-5-1	(United States) Charles Cue	KO	1	1997-12-13	Pompano Beach, Florida, United States	
Win	1-2	(United States) Willie Chapman	UD	4	1997-06-28	Las Vegas, Nevada, United States	
Win	2-5	(United States) Ricardo Phillips	PTS	4	1997-03-29	Las Vegas, Nevada, United States	
Win	0-13	(United States) Jerry Barnes	TKO	1	1997-01-11	Nashville, Tennessee, United States	

== After boxing ==
Jones appeared on an episode of HBO's Mayweather-Hatton 24/7 series as an assistant trainer to Floyd Mayweather Jr. Mayweather, a friend of Jones from the U.S. Olympic Team, offered Jones a job as an assistant. He was again seen in Showtime's 'Inside Mayweather vs Pacquiao' training Floyd and giving insight to their friendship and time in the olympics together. Nate is now an established member of TMT (The Money Team) and is said to be one of Mayweathers strategists.
