= Ron Guerrero =

American professional boxer

Personal information
- Nickname: El Tejanito
- Nationality: American
- Born: March 6, 1974 (age 52) Corpus Christi, Texas, U.S.
- Height: 185 cm (6 ft 1 in)
- Weight: Heavyweight

Boxing career
- Stance: Orthodox

Boxing record
- Total fights: 47
- Wins: 23
- Win by KO: 14
- Losses: 21
- Draws: 3

Ron Guerrero (born March 3, 1974) is an American professional boxer who challenged for the WBA Fedecentro Heavyweight Title in 2004, and for the WBF World Heavyweight Title in 2009.

He sparred with the Klitschko brothers. He was trained by Tony Ayala, Sr. for his fight against Francois Botha.

== Professional record ==
23 Wins (14 knockouts), 21 Losses (6 knockouts), 3 Draws
Res.	Record	Opponent	Type	Rd., Time	Date	Location	Notes
Win	22-20-3	(United States) Maurenzo Smith	UD	6	2020-03-07	Constellation Field, Sugar Land, Texas, U.S.	Won vacant American Boxing Federation American West Heavyweight Title
Loss	20-16-3	(South Africa) Francois Botha	UD	12	2009-02-06	Tlokwe Banquet Hall, Potchefstroom, South Africa	For vacant WBF World Heavyweight Title in 2009
Win	20-15-3	(United States) Roderick Willis	TKO		2008-05-24	Richard M. Borchard Regional Fairgrounds, Robstown, Texas, U.S.	
Loss	19-15-3	(United States) Chazz Witherspoon	RTD	5 (8)	2007-09-29	(New Jersey) Boardwalk Hall, Atlantic City, U.S.	
Loss	19-14-3	(United States) Kevin Johnson	UD	8	2007-06-09	Connecticut Convention Center, Hartford, U.S.	
Win	19-13-3	(United States) Hector Ferreyro	KO		2007-04-20	Casa Blanca Ballroom, Laredo, Texas, U.S.	
Win	18-12-3	(United States) Robbie McClimans	SD	8	2006-09-15	Dodge Arena, Hidalgo, Texas, U.S.	
Loss	16-11-3	(Nigeria) David Defiagbon	TKO	5	2004-06-12	Cedarbridge Academy, Devonshire Parish, Bermuda	For WBA Fedecentro Heavyweight Title
Loss	16-10-3	(United States) Kendrick Releford	UD	8	2004-04-29	Laredo, Texas, U.S.	For vacant USA Texas State Heavyweight Title
Win	16-6-3	(France) Josué Blocus	RTD	5	2003-02-15	Caesars Palace, Las Vegas, Nevada, U.S.	
Loss	15-6-2	(United States) Tony Thompson	UD	5	2002-08-31	(New York (state)) Strawberry Field, Bridgehampton, New York, U.S.	
Loss	15-4-2	(United States) Attila Levin	UD	10	2002-03-29	Paris Las Vegas, Las Vegas, Nevada, U.S.	
Win	15-3-1	(United States) Terrence Lewis	UD	10	2002-03-29	Flamingo Hilton, Laughlin, Nevada, U.S.	
Win	11-3-1	(Mexico) Adam Flores	UD	6	2000-10-06	Hard Rock Hotel and Casino, Las Vegas, Nevada, U.S.	
Win	10-3-1	(United States) Brian Nix	PTS	8	2000-07-27	(New York (state)) Hammerstein Ballroom, Manhattan, New York, U.S.	
Draw	8-2-1	(United States) Jameel McCline	PTS	8	2000-01-27	(New York (state)) Hammerstein Ballroom, Manhattan, New York, U.S.	
Win	6-1	(United States) Bobby Scoggins	SD	6	1999-09-23	Convention Center, Fort Worth, Texas, U.S.	
Win	5-1	(United States) Jason Waller	TKO		1999-08-12	Civic Center Arena, Laredo, Texas, U.S.	
