= Josué Blocus =

French boxer

Personal information
- Full name: Josué Edmond Blocus
- Nationality: France/United States
- Born: 20 November 1969 (age 56) Saint-Claude, Basse-Terre, Guadeloupe
- Height: 1.87 m (6 ft 2 in)
- Weight: 103 kg (227 lb)

Sport
- Sport: Boxing
- Weight class: Super Heavyweight
- Club: AS Fresnes 94

Josué Edmond Blocus (born 20 November 1969) is a French heavyweight boxer who competed in the 1996 Olympics. Blocus is a black Frenchman whose family is from Guadeloupe.

== Amateur career ==
At the 1996 European Championships in Vejle, Denmark, he beat Zoran Manojlovic (Yugoslavia) but lost to Serguei Lyakhovich (Belarus) on points.

At the 1996 Olympics in Atlanta he fought as a superheavyweight and beat Jesús Guevara, Venezuela, RSC-2 (02:13) but was stopped in the second round by big-punching Adalat Mamedov, Azerbaijan by RSC-1 (02:11).

== Professional career ==
He turned pro in 1997, showing big power in six early wins, including one over Sedreck Fields. He then fought only five times over the next five years before getting outpointed in 2002 by Friday Ahunanya and knocked out by club fighter Guerrero (record 15–6). In 2007, at age 37, he rebounded and scored the biggest win of his pro career, beating Canadian champion David Cadieux on the road.

== Professional boxing record ==
16 Wins (14 knockouts, 2 decisions), 2 Losses (1 knockout, 1 decision)
Result	Record	Opponent	Type	Round	Date	Location	Notes
Win	16-2	Darryl Holley	TKO	1	09/10/2010	Atlanta, Georgia, U.S.	Referee stopped the bout at 1:50 of the first round.
Win	15-2	David Cadieux	SD	12	12/05/2007	Montreal, Quebec, Canada	WBO NABO Heavyweight Title.
Win	14-2	Nicolai Firtha	TKO	7	16/06/2006	Duluth, Georgia, U.S.	Referee stopped the bout at 2:28 of the seventh round.
Win	13-2	Eric Starr	TKO	4	16/12/2005	Atlanta, Georgia, U.S.	
Loss	12-2	Ron Guerrero	RTD	5	15/02/2003	Las Vegas, Nevada, U.S.	Blocus did not come out for the sixth round.
Loss	12-1	Friday Ahunanya	SD	10	01/06/2002	Atlantic City, New Jersey, U.S.	
Win	12-0	Albert Stewart	TKO	3	30/03/2002	Reading, Pennsylvania, U.S.	Referee stopped the bout at 2:52 of the third round.
Win	11-0	Kevin Rosier	TKO	1	09/12/2000	Villeurbanne, France	
Win	10-0	Mario Cawley	UD	6	28/11/2000	Las Vegas, Nevada, U.S.	
Win	9-0	Clarence Goins	TKO	1	13/11/1999	Las Vegas, Nevada, U.S.	Referee stopped the bout at 2:40 of the first round.
Win	8-0	Lou Turichiarelli	TKO	1	12/06/1999	Wilmington, Massachusetts, U.S.	
Win	7-0	Juan Pablo Rodriguez	TKO	1	09/05/1998	Sacramento, California, U.S.	
Win	6-0	Gene Jones	KO	2	18/10/1997	Las Vegas, Nevada, U.S.	Jones knocked out at 1:09 of the second round.
Win	5-0	Ronnie Smith	TKO	3	17/06/1997	Bay Saint Louis, Mississippi, U.S.	Referee stopped the bout at 2:55 of the third round.
Win	4-0	James Lester	TKO	1	07/06/1997	Sacramento, California, U.S.	
Win	3-0	Alonzo Hollis	TKO	3	14/05/1997	Montreal, Quebec, Canada	Referee stopped the bout at 2:27 of the third round.
Win	2-0	Sedreck Fields	KO	1	05/05/1997	Atlantic City, New Jersey, U.S.	
Win	1-0	Russell Pugh	KO	1	26/04/1997	Atlantic City, New Jersey, U.S.	
