= Variani =

Variani ვარიანი
- Location in Georgia
- Coordinates: 42°04′27″N 44°02′01″E
- Country: Georgia
- Region: Shida Kartli
- Municipality: Gori
- Elevation: 680 m (2,230 ft)

Population (2014)
  - Total: 1,469
- Time zone: UTC+4 (Georgian Time)

Variani (Georgian: ვარიანი) is a village in the Gori District of Shida Kartli, about 12 kilometres (7.5 mi) from Gori. As of 2014, it had a population of 1,469.

Variani is best known for being the birthplace of Iakob Gogebashvili and the location of the Iakob Gogebashvili House Museum, being a border village to the South Ossetia disputed territory, and being occupied by Russian forces in the 2008 South Ossetia war until 8 October 2008.

== Notable people ==
In addition to Iakob Gogebashvili, who was born in Variani in 1841, the boxer Georgi Kandelaki who won the 1997 World Amateur Boxing Championships in the Superheavyweight category and competed in the 1996 Summer Olympics, was born on 10 April 1971 in Variani.

== See also ==
- Shida Kartli
