= Ahmed El-Said =

Egyptian boxer (born 1970)

Personal information
- Nationality: Egyptian
- Born: 15 April 1970 (age 55)

Sport
- Sport: Boxing

Ahmed El-Said (born 15 April 1970) is an Egyptian boxer. He competed in the men's super heavyweight event at the 1996 Summer Olympics.
