= Luan Krasniqi =

Albanian boxer

Personal information
- Nickname: Lion (Luan in Albanian)
- Nationality: German
- Born: 10 May 1971 (age 55) Junik, SFR Yugoslavia (nowadays Kosovo)
- Height: 192 cm (6 ft 4 in)
- Weight: Heavyweight

Boxing career
- Reach: 193 cm (76 in)
- Stance: Southpaw

Boxing record
- Total fights: 35
- Wins: 30
- Win by KO: 14
- Losses: 4
- Draws: 1
Medal record
Representing Germany
Men's Boxing
Olympic Games
Bronze medal – third place	1996 Atlanta	Heavyweight
World Amateur Championships
Silver medal – second place	1995 Berlin	Heavyweight
European Amateur Championships
Gold medal – first place	1996 Vejle	Heavyweight

Luan Krasniqi (born 10 May 1971) is a German-Kosovan actor and former professional boxer. He held the European heavyweight title and also challenged for the WBO world heavyweight title.

== Background ==
Krasniqi is the youngest of eight children to Kosovar Albanian parents. He has often said that he had a happy and active childhood, growing up in Junik, a small town in the District of Deçan, where in 1987 he finished his primary and secondary school, before his family moved to Rottweil in Germany. Krasniqi stated "my childhood was good, but when I learned that we would be rejoining my father who had moved to Rottweil in 1970 I was overjoyed. I had dreamt about a move to the city and now it was coming true!".

Krasniqi graduated in Germany his A-Level and an education as a wholesaler.

== Amateur ==
Krasniqi started boxing at the age of 16. His boxing-career began at the local BSV Rottweil, where he met Theo Kerekesch, a boxing trainer of high regard who he trained with to become a heavyweight boxer.

Once Krasniqi had been granted German citizenship, he entered the Multi-Nations Tournament in Liverpool, England and won the gold medal. He consolidated the success with a gold medal later that year at the German Championships, Berlin.

Krasniqi stormed the 1995 World Amateur Boxing Championships, by taking the silver medal beating Sinan Samil Sam and Wladimir Klitschko – losing only to one of the best amateur boxers of all times, the Cuban Félix Savón. Krasniqi ended the year on a roll, taking the Heavyweight Gold in the International Chemie Cup Tournament, Halle.

1996 he added the European Championships with a win over Christophe Mendy.

=== 1996 Summer Olympics ===
At the Olympic Games in Atlanta he beat future amateur and professional champion Ruslan Chagaev and reached a semi-final bout with Félix Savón. The semi-final bout against Félix Savón was short-lived. During the bout, Krasniqi was cut under the eye. The cut would be examined by the ringside doctor and resulted in a medical stoppage. This left him unable to fight for an Olympic gold medal.

Krasniqi returned to Germany with the bronze medal, Germany's first heavyweight medal since 1976. "I felt that I could have beaten him. He had out-pointed me the previous year but I had grown stronger and developed further since then. I am sure that the fight would have been close but I think that this time, I would have celebrated." However, Krasniqi had many memories to savour from Atlanta - one of which was a meeting with his idol, Muhammad Ali. "Muhammad Ali was and still is an idol. Nobody can ever achieve what he achieved. Such a thing is a once in a lifetime phenomenon."

"To shine so long and so brightly, to define eras in history with the sheer force of his ability and personality and to be so well remembered is unique. Meeting him was an honour I shall never forget." Krasniqi took his first steps to his own fame as he decided to get in at Panix Promotions, where Lennox Lewis had his contract.

1996 Olympic Results Boxed as a Heavyweight (– 91 kg)

- Round 1 - Defeated Ruslan Chagaev (Uzbekistan) 12:4
- Round of 16 - Defeated Igor Kshinin (Russia) 10:2
- Quarterfinals - Defeated Serguei Dychkov (Belarus) 10:5
- Semifinals - Lost by Félix Savón (Cuba) WO

== Professional career ==
Krasniqi won his first fight (with Harry Senior). In order to improve his training he was invited to train with Lennox Lewis in Big Bear Lake, where he was in preparation for the fight against Andrzej Gołota. Luan showed that he could resist the pressure of sparring with Lewis. Since then, he has been to Big Bear Lake three times.

During Lewis' training for the fights against Shannon Briggs, Željko Mavrović and Evander Holyfield he was one of his sparring partners. Luan overcame with success the first hurdles of his career as a "newcomer" in professional boxing. He boxed extremely successfully for Panix Promotion 15 times and in 2000 after Lennox Lewis had terminated his contract, Luan decided to look for a new alternative. In February and April 2000 he built his connections with Universum Box-Promotion and fought a number of matches for them. In January 2001 he signed a three years long contract with Universum Box-Promotion.

The highlight of his career was the fight against Rene Monse, when he became European Champion. He was the first German European Champion after 29 years.

=== First loss ===
A half year later Krasniqi lost his belt in a fight against Przemysław Saleta. The man from Rottweil was prepared for eight rounds. But after an injury of Vitali Klitschko, his fight was pushed to the main event. Mainly due to this lack of preparation, although leading by points, Krasniqi apparently feared a loss and elected to quit.

After this defeat Krasniqi struggled to get back to the top of the European rankings. Finally on 14 February 2004 he won against the "Bull from Bosphorus" Sinan Samil Sam and became European Champion once again.

=== Later career ===
2005 brought Krasniqi to the top of the heavyweight competition after he knocked out highly regarded Lance Whitaker and became a mandatory challenger for the WBO crown. He lost against Lamon Brewster. Brewster managed to efficiently attack Krasniqi's body. This resulted in Krasniqi fatiguing in the latter rounds and finally being forced into a punch-exchange and getting knocked down in round 9.

It was a disappointing loss to a lot of German and Albanian fans, since the resurrection of a new German heavyweight champion was highly anticipated to occur on Max Schmeling's 100th birthday.

Luan's next fight took place on 29 April 2006 in Stuttgart, Germany, where he won against David Bostice.

Luan Krasniqi was scheduled to fight against Top 10 contender, Tony Thompson, in September 2006, but no contract was made. Krasniqi has stated that the money offered by his promoter Klaus-Peter Kohl was insufficient.

On 17 March 2007, Krasniqi fought Brian Minto for the title of WBO Intercontinental Champion. Despite having a height disadvantage of 4 inches (10 cm), Minto was able to hold his own against Krasniqi. However, in the 12th round Krasniqi was able to knock Minto down and win the match. It was later stated that it was Krasniqi's tactic to tire his adversary. This won Luan Krasniqi the title of Intercontinental Champion and has given him the possibility of a fight against Shannon Briggs.

Kransiqi lost to Tony Thompson, putting a serious dent in his hopes at a future title shot. On 11 November 2008, he lost by a third-round knockout to unbeaten Alexander Dimitrenko.

== Personal life ==
He is currently an actor. Prior to his boxing success, Krasniqi worked in wholesale and foreign trade. Luan Krasniqi's two boxing idols are Muhammad Ali and Lennox Lewis.

== Accomplishments ==
- German Heavyweight Champion 2001–2002
- EBU Heavyweight Champion 2002, 2004–2005
- WBO Intercontinental Champion 2007

== Professional boxing record ==
30 Wins (14 knockouts, 16 decisions), 4 Losses (4 knockouts, 0 decisions), 1 Draw
Result	Record	Opponent	Type	Round	Date	Location	Notes
Loss	30-4-1	(Ukraine) Alexander Dimitrenko	KO	3	15/11/2008	Düsseldorf, Germany	WBO Intercontinental Heavyweight Title. Krasniqi was knocked out at 2:54 of the third round.
Loss	30-3-1	(United States) Tony Thompson	TKO	5	14/07/2007	Hamburg, Germany	WBO Intercontinental Heavyweight Title; Referee stopped the bout at 2:39 of the fifth round.
Win	30-2-1	(United States) Brian Minto	UD	12	17/03/2007	Stuttgart, Germany	WBO Intercontinental Heavyweight Title.
Win	29-2-1	(United States) David Bostice	UD	10	29/04/2006	Stuttgart, Germany	
Loss	28-2-1	(United States) Lamon Brewster	TKO	9	28/09/2005	Hamburg, Germany	WBO Heavyweight Title. Referee stopped the bout at 2:48 of the ninth round.
Win	28-1-1	(United States) Lance Whitaker	KO	6	28/05/2005	Stuttgart, Germany	Whitaker knocked out at 2:06 of the sixth round.
Draw	27-1-1	(Germany) Timo Hoffmann	PTS	12	04/12/2004	Berlin, Germany	EBU Heavyweight Title.
Win	27-1	(Germany) Rene Monse	TKO	7	31/07/2004	Stuttgart, Germany	EBU Heavyweight Title. Referee stopped the bout at 0:01 of the seventh round when Monse's corner threw in the towel.
Win	26-1	(Turkey) Sinan Şamil Sam	UD	12	14/02/2004	Stuttgart, Germany	EBU Heavyweight Title.
Win	25-1	(United Kingdom) Julius Francis	UD	8	18/10/2003	Hamburg, Germany	
Win	24-1	(United States) Doug Liggion	UD	8	30/08/2003	Munich, Germany	
Win	23-1	(Poland) Przemysław Saleta	TKO	1	26/04/2003	Schwerin, Germany	Referee stopped the bout at 2:53 of the first round after Saleta was knocked down thrice.
Win	22-1	(United States) Sedreck Fields	UD	8	08/02/2003	Berlin, Germany	
Win	21-1	(United States) Thomas Williams	KO	1	23/11/2002	Dortmund, Germany	
Loss	20-1	(Poland) Przemysław Saleta	TKO	9	20/07/2002	Dortmund, Germany	EBU Heavyweight Title. Krasniqi did not leave his corner for the ninth round.
Win	20-0	(Germany) Rene Monse	MD	12	05/01/2002	Magdeburg, Germany	EBU Heavyweight Title.
Win	19-0	(Ukraine) Yuriy Yelistratov	TKO	3	29/09/2001	Hamburg, Germany	
Win	18-0	(Germany) Rene Hanl	TKO	2	21/07/2001	Aachen, Germany	Germany BDB Heavyweight Title.
Win	17-0	(United States) Paul Phillips	KO	1	07/04/2001	Hamburg, Germany	
Win	16-0	(United States) Cleveland Woods	KO	3	24/02/2001	Hamburg, Germany	
Win	15-0	(United States) Rodney McSwain	TKO	4	27/05/2000	(United Kingdom) London, England	
Win	14-0	(France) Antoine Palatis	PTS	6	01/04/2000	Berlin, Germany	
Win	13-0	(United States) Everett Martin	PTS	8	19/02/2000	Berlin, Germany	
Win	12-0	(United Kingdom) Michael Murray	PTS	8	18/12/1999	(United Kingdom) London, England	
Win	11-0	(Russia) Alexey Osokin	TKO	3	16/10/1999	Belfast, Northern Ireland	
Win	10-0	(Austria) Biko Botowamungu	DQ	5	21/08/1999	Dresden, Germany	
Win	9-0	(Slovakia) Ladislav Husarik	PTS	6	27/03/1999	Dresden, Germany	
Win	8-0	(United Kingdom) Shane Woollas	TKO	3	26/09/1998	(United Kingdom) York, England	
Win	7-0	(France) Abdelrani Berbachi	PTS	6	02/05/1998	(United Kingdom) London, England	
Win	6-0	(Bulgaria) Spas Spasov	PTS	6	28/03/1998	(United Kingdom) Kingston upon Hull, England	
Win	5-0	(Bulgaria) Stefan Trendafilov	TKO	1	14/02/1998	(United Kingdom) London, England	
Win	4-0	(France) Phillipe Houyvet	TKO	4	16/12/1997	Nord, France	
Win	3-0	(United States) Lewan Livingstone	UD	4	02/11/1997	Halle, Germany	
Win	2-0	(United States) Kevin Hudson	TKO	4	04/10/1997	(United States) Atlantic City, New Jersey, U.S.	Referee stopped the bout at 1:37 of the fourth round.
Win	1-0	(United Kingdom) Harry Senior	PTS	4	02/09/1997	(United Kingdom) London, England	

== Television viewership ==
=== Germany ===
Date	Fight	Viewership (avg.)	Network	Source
26 April 2003	Luan Krasniqi vs. Przemyslaw Saleta	3,390,000	ZDF	
14 February 2004	Luan Krasniqi vs. Sinan Samil Sam	4,330,000	ZDF	
4 December 2004	Luan Krasniqi vs. Timo Hoffmann	5,180,000	ZDF	
28 May 2005	Luan Krasniqi vs. Lance Whitaker	3,540,000	ZDF	
28 September 2005	Lamon Brewster vs. Luan Krasniqi	7,620,000	ZDF	
29 April 2006	Luan Krasniqi vs. David Bostice	6,200,000	ZDF	
17 March 2007	Luan Krasniqi vs. Brian Minto	6,390,000	ZDF	
7 July 2007	Luan Krasniqi vs. Tony Thompson	4,640,000	ZDF	
15 November 2008	Luan Krasniqi vs. Alexander Dimitrenko	4,770,000	ZDF	
	Total viewership	46,080,000		
