= Alexei Lezin =

Russian boxer (born 1973)

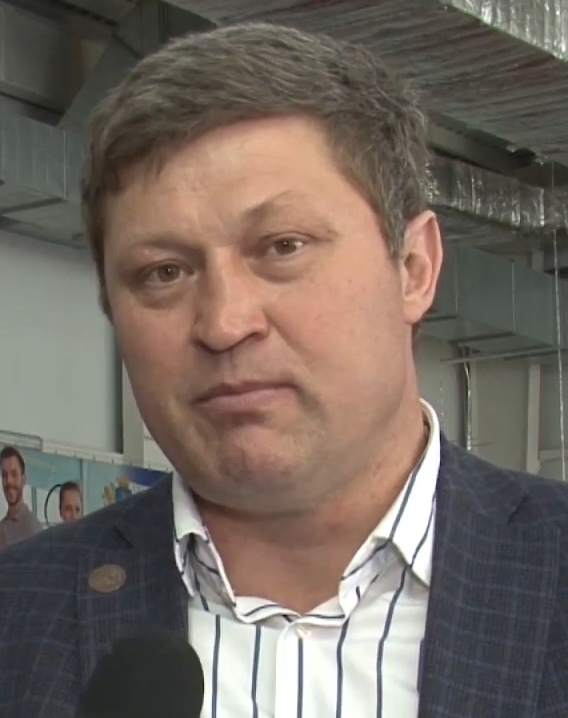
- Lezin in 2021

Personal information
- Full name: Алексей Владимирович Лёзин
- Nationality: Russia
- Born: February 27, 1973 (age 53) Energetik, Orenburg Oblast, Russian SFSR, Soviet Union
- Height: 1.98 m (6 ft 6 in)
- Weight: 106 kg (234 lb)

Sport
- Sport: Boxing
- Weight class: Super Heavyweight
- Club: Ministry of Defense Sports Club
Medal record
Olympic Games
Bronze medal – third place	1996 Atlanta	Super Heavyweight
Military World Games
Silver medal – second place	1995 Ariccia	Super Heavyweight
World Championships
Gold medal – first place	1995 Berlin	Super Heavyweight
World Military Championships
Gold medal – first place	1994 Tunis	Super Heavyweight
European Championships
Gold medal – first place	1996 Vejle	Super Heavyweight
Gold medal – first place	1998 Minsk	Super Heavyweight
Gold medal – first place	2000 Tampere	Super Heavyweight
Russian National Championships
Gold medal – first place	2003 Ulyanovsk	Super Heavyweight

Alexei Vladimirovich Lezin (Russian: Алексей Владимирович Лeзин, born February 27, 1973) is a Russian former boxer, who won the Super Heavyweight bronze medal at the 1996 Summer Olympics.

== Accomplishments ==
- 1993 competed as a Heavyweight at the World Championships in Tampere, Finland. Lost to Félix Savón in the quarter-final.
- 1994 won the Military World Championships in Tunis, Tunisia as a Super Heavyweight, defeating Vitali Klitschko in the final.
- 1994 won the Goodwill Games in Saint Petersburg, Russia, defeating Nikolay Valuev and Lance Whitaker.
- 1995 won the World Championship in Berlin, Germany, defeating Vitali Klitschko in the final.
- 1995 2nd place at Military World Championship in Ariccia, Italy. Lost to Vitali Klitschko in the final.
- 1996 won the European Championship in Vejle, Denmark, defeating Wladimir Klitschko in the final.
- 1997 competed at World Championship in Budapest, Hungary. Lost to Alexis Rubalcaba in the quarter-final.
- 1998 won the European Championship in Minsk, Belarus. Defeated Sinan Samil Sam in the Semifinal.
- 2000 won the European Championship in Tampere, Finland, defeated Paolo Vidoz in the final.
- 2003 won the Russian National Championships in Ulyanovsk, Russia, defeating Alexander Povetkin in the final.

== Olympic results ==
- 1996 won the bronze medal at the Atlanta Olympics representing Russia.
  - Defeated Mikhail Yurchenko (Kazakhstan) RSC-1
  - Defeated René Monse (Germany) PTS (9–5)
  - Lost to Wladimir Klitschko (Ukraine) PTS (1–4)
- 2000 competed at the Sydney Olympics representing Russia.
  - Lost to Audley Harrison (Great Britain) RSC-4

== Personal life ==
Lezin is married. He has a daughter and a son.
