= Attila Levin =

Swedish boxer

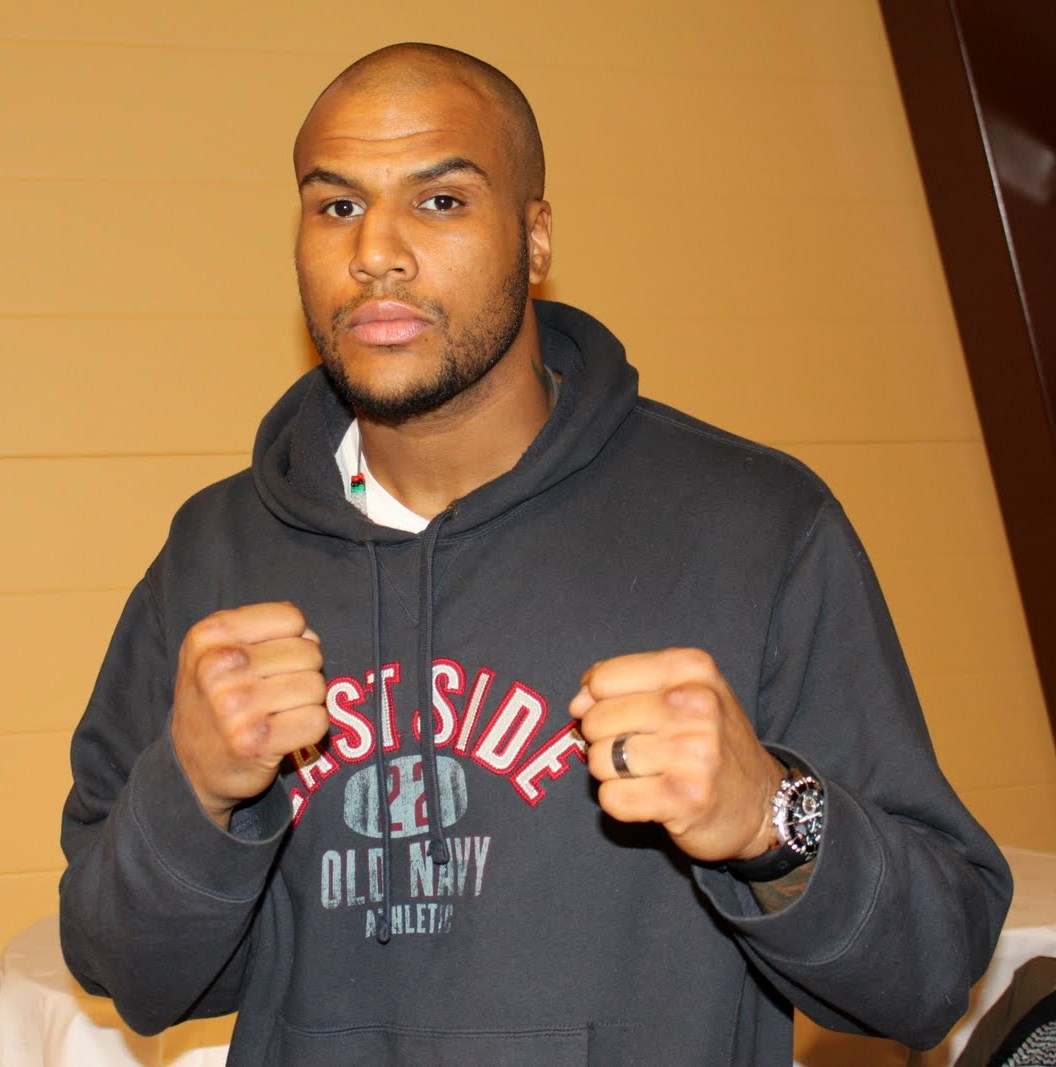
- Levin in 2010

Personal information
- Nickname: The Hun
- Nationality: Swedish
- Born: Attila Sheriff Alexander Levin; November 8, 1976 (age 49) Stockholm, Sweden
- Height: 6 ft 5 in (1.96 m)
- Weight: Heavyweight

Boxing career
- Reach: 80 in (203 cm)
- Stance: Orthodox

Boxing record
- Total fights: 38
- Wins: 34
- Win by KO: 27
- Losses: 4
- Draws: 0

Attila Levin (born November 8, 1976) is a Swedish professional boxer.

== Amateur career ==
Levin had a decent amateur career prior to turning professional.

- In 1996 Levin competed at the European Championships in Vejle, Denmark as a Super Heavyweight. Results were:
  - Defeated Henryk Zatyka (Poland) points
  - Defeated Petr Horáček (Czech Republic) TKO 1
  - Lost to Wladimir Klitschko (Ukraine) points
- Levin represented Sweden as a Super Heavyweight at the 1996 Olympic Games in Atlanta, Georgia. Results were:
  - Defeated Jean-François Bergeron (Canada) TKO 1
  - Lost to Wladimir Klitschko (Ukraine) TKO by 1

== Professional career ==
Levin turned pro in 1997 and started off his pro career going undefeated in his first 14 fights. He then faced journeyman Ramon Hayes in 2000, and was upset via TKO after being dropped twice. Levin then ran off another winning streak knocking out guys like Ray Austin before facing fringe contender Jeremy Williams in 2004, and losing via TKO in the 8th. He then fought undefeated Nikolay Valuev, and was TKO'd in the 3rd round. After three years off he restarted his career in 2008 with a win against Willie Perryman (TKO) in a boxing gala held in Kissimmee, Florida. On 28 November 2010 he lost to Robert Helenius via TKO in the 2nd round.

== Professional boxing record ==
35 Wins (27 knockouts, 8 decisions), 4 Losses (4 knockouts) Archived April 18, 2014, at the Wayback Machine
Result	Record	Opponent	Type	Round	Date	Location	Notes
Win	35-4	(Greece) Marios Kollias	UD	4	11/04/2019	(Sweden) Clarion Hotel Post, Gothenburg	
Loss	34-4	(Finland) Robert Helenius	TKO	2 (12), 1:20	27/11/2010	(Finland) Hartwall Areena, Helsinki	EBU/WBO Intercontinental Heavyweight Titles.
Win	34-3	(Latvia) Edgars Kalnars	TKO	1 (8), 2:19	27/11/2009	(Finland) Pyynikin Palloiluhalli, Tampere	
Win	33-3	(Georgia (country)) Leri Okhanashvili	TKO	3 (6), 2:45	24/10/2009	(Finland) Urheilutalo, Helsinki	
Win	32-3	(Bosnia and Herzegovina) Adnan Buharalija	TKO	4 (6)	04/09/2009	(Sweden) Lofbergs Lila Arena, Karlstad	
Win	31-3	(Russia) Evgeny Orlov	UD	4	05/09/2008	(Sweden) Nojesfabriken, Karlstad	
Win	30-3	(United States) Willie Perryman	KO	1 (6), 1:41	28/03/2008	(United States) Kissimmee Civic Center, Kissimmee, Florida	
Loss	29-3	(Russia) Nikolay Valuev	TKO	3 (12), 2:34	12/02/2005	(Germany) Max-Schmeling-Halle, Prenzlauer Berg, Berlin	WBA Intercontinental Heavyweight Title.
Loss	29-2	(United States) Jeremy Williams	TKO	8 (10), 2:48	15/04/2004	(United States) Hammerstein Ballroom, New York City	
Win	29-1	(Argentina) Pedro Daniel Franco	KO	3 (8)	13/12/2003	(Germany) Nuremberg Arena, Nuremberg, Bavaria	
Win	28-1	(United States) Kenny Craven	KO	2 (8)	04/10/2003	(Germany) Stadthalle, Zwickau, Saxony	
Win	27-1	(Dominican Republic) Fernely Feliz	UD	10	24/05/2003	(United States) Reno Hilton Casino Resort, Reno, Nevada	
Win	26-1	(United States) Gary Winmon	KO	1 (8), 2:52	18/04/2003	(United States) A La Carte Event Pavilion, Tampa, Florida	
Win	25-1	(United States) Ross Puritty	UD	10	08/09/2002	(United States) Great Plains Coliseum, Lawton, Oklahoma	
Win	24-1	(United States) Ron Guerrero	UD	10	29/03/2002	(United States) Paris Las Vegas, Las Vegas, Nevada	
Win	23-1	(United States) Jim Huffman	TKO	2 (5)	30/01/2002	(United States) Level Nightclub, Miami Beach, Florida	
Win	22-1	(Netherlands) Fred Westgeest	TKO	5 (8)	01/12/2001	(United States) Jacob K. Javits Convention Center, New York City	
Win	21-1	(United States) Troy Weida	TKO	3 (6), 0:26	13/10/2001	(Denmark) Parken Stadium, Copenhagen	
Win	20-1	(United States) Ray Austin	TKO	9 (10), 0:30	20/07/2001	(United States) Caesars Palace, Las Vegas, Nevada	
Win	19-1	(Puerto Rico) Miguel Otero Ocasio	TKO	2 (6)	30/04/2001	(Denmark) Ronne Idraetshal, Ronne	
Win	18-1	(United States) A.J. Moore	RTD	3 (6), 3:00	22/02/2001	(United States) Harrisburg, Pennsylvania	Moore did not come out for the fourth round.
Win	17-1	(United States) Russell Chasteen	TKO	2 (6), 1:00	08/12/2000	(United States) Hard Rock Hotel and Casino, Las Vegas, Nevada	
Win	16-1	(United States) Chavez Francisco	TKO	2 (6)	02/11/2000	(United States) Bethlehem, Pennsylvania	
Win	15-1	(United States) Marcellus Brown	TKO	3 (6), 2:44	06/10/2000	(United States) Hard Rock Hotel and Casino, Las Vegas, Nevada	
Loss	14-1	(United States) Ramon Hayes	TKO	1 (6), 0:54	29/06/2000	(United States) Hammerstein Ballroom, New York City	
Win	14-0	(United States) Bryant Smith	UD	6	24/02/2000	(United States) Hammerstein Ballroom, New York City	
Win	13-0	(United States) Marcus Johnson	UD	6	29/10/1999	(Canada) Molson Centre, Montreal, Quebec	
Win	12-0	(United States) Eddie Richardson	UD	8	16/09/1999	(United States) Grand Casino, Biloxi, Mississippi	
Win	11-0	(United States) Steve Barnes Edwards	TKO	2 (6), 1:35	05/08/1999	(United States) Grand Casino, Tunica, Mississippi	
Win	10-0	(United States) Booker T Word	KO	2 (6), 2:30	20/05/1999	(United States) Grand Casino, Tunica, Mississippi	
Win	9-0	(United States) Curtis Branch	TKO	3 (4)	15/04/1999	(United States) Miccosukee Casino, Miami, Florida	
Win	8-0	(United States) Kimmuel Odum	TKO	2 (10)	12/03/1999	(United States) Roseland Ballroom, New York City	
Win	7-0	(United States) Cornelius Ellis	TKO	1 (4)	12/12/1998	(United States) The Ritz, Raleigh, North Carolina	
Win	6-0	(United States) Louis Gallucci	TKO	3 (4), 2:08	16/10/1998	(United States) Memorial Auditorium, Fort Lauderdale, Florida	
Win	5-0	(United States) Ron McGowan	KO	1 (4), 1:30	02/10/1998	(United States) Lake Charles, Louisiana	
Win	4-0	(United States) Raymond Ladner	TKO	1 (4), 0:20	20/08/1998	(United States) Sheraton Hotel, Houston, Texas	
Win	3-0	(United States) Derrick Edwards	TKO	1 (4), 2:38	02/06/1998	(United States) Charlotte County Auditorium, Punta Gorda, Florida	
Win	2-0	(United States) Mitchell Johnson	TKO	1 (4), 1:28	04/04/1998	(United States) Miccosukee Casino, Miami, Florida	
Win	1-0	(United States) Isaac Poole	TKO	1 (4)	25/07/1997	(United States) Davidson Theatre, Pembroke Pines, Florida	
