= Vitali Boot =

German boxer

Medal record
Men's Boxing
Representing Germany
World Amateur Championships
Bronze medal – third place	2001 Belfast	Super Heavyweight

Vitali Boot is a German amateur boxer best known to win the bronze medal at super heavyweight at the 2001 World Amateur Boxing Championships. There he beat Poland's Grzegorz Kielsa (20:14), but lost to eventual winner Ruslan Chagaev.

Boot won the German championships seven times. He defeated world class Sebastian Köber in the final of the German championships 2002 but lost to him 12:18 in the final 2003. In 2004 he became German champion by defeating Ibrahim Altingul.
