= Ovidiu Bali =

Romanian boxer

Personal information
- Nationality: Romanian
- Born: 14 February 1975 (age 50); Bușteni, Romania

Sport
- Sport: Boxing

Ovidiu Bali (born 14 February 1975) is a Romanian boxer. He competed in the men's heavyweight event at the 1996 Summer Olympics.
