= David Defiagbon =

Nigerian/Canadian boxer

Personal information
- Nickname: The Dream
- Nationality: Nigerian; Canadian
- Born: David Dejiro Defiagbon; 12 June 1970 Sapele, Delta State, Nigeria
- Died: 24 November 2018 (aged 48) Las Vegas, Nevada, U.S.
- Height: 6 ft 5 in (196 cm)
- Weight: Heavyweight

Boxing career
- Reach: 82 in (208 cm)
- Stance: Orthodox

Boxing record
- Total fights: 23
- Wins: 21
- Win by KO: 12
- Losses: 2
- Draws: 0
Medal record
Men's boxing
Representing Canada
Olympic Games
Silver medal – second place	1996 Atlanta	Heavyweight
Representing Nigeria
Commonwealth Games
Gold medal – first place	1990 Auckland	Welterweight
All-Africa Games
Bronze medal – third place	1991 Cairo	Light-middleweight

David Dejiro Defiagbon (12 June 1970 – 24 November 2018) was a Nigerian boxer. Nicknamed "The Dream", Defiagbon fought for Canada and won the heavyweight silver medal at the 1996 Summer Olympics.

== Amateur ==
Born in Sapele, Nigeria, Defiagbon won gold in the welterweight (– 67 kg) division at the 1990 Commonwealth Games. As a light-middleweight, he won a bronze medal in the 1991 All-Africa Games in Cairo. At the 1992 Summer Olympics, he was eliminated in the first round of the light middleweight division (7 to 8 against Raúl Márquez).

Defiagbon went on to fight for Canada for whom he won the heavyweight silver medal (limit 201 lbs) at the 1996 Summer Olympics beating Nate Jones, losing to Félix Savón.

=== Results ===
1990 Commonwealth Games

- Defeated James Pender (Scotland) RSCH-3
- Defeated Alfred Ankamah (Ghana) 5–0
- Defeated Anthony Mwamba (Zambia) 4–1
- Defeated Greg Johnson (Canada) 5–0

1992 Summer Olympics

- Lost to Raúl Márquez (United States) 7–8

1996 Summer Olympics

- 1st round bye
- Defeated Omar Ahmed (Kenya) 15–4
- Defeated Christophe Mendy (France) DQ 3 (1:01)
- Defeated Nate Jones (United States) 10–16
- Lost to Félix Savón (Cuba) 2–20

== Professional boxing record ==
21 Wins (12 knockouts, 9 decisions), 2 Losses (1 knockout, 1 decision)
Result	Record	Opponent	Type	Round	Date	Location	Notes
Loss	37–1	(Cuba) Juan Carlos Gomez	TKO	3	2005-01-15	Magdeburg, Germany	Referee stopped the bout at 2:58 of the third round.
Loss	28–5	(United States) Oleg Maskaev	SD	10	2004-07-23	(United States) Atlantic City, New Jersey, US	
Win	16–10–3	(United States) Ron Guerrero	TKO	5	2004-06-12	Devonshire Parish, Bermuda	WBA Fedecentro Heavyweight Title. Referee stopped the bout at 1:09 of the fifth round.
Win	19–14–2	(United States) Ken Murphy	UD	6	2004-03-13	(United States) Columbus, Ohio, US	
Win	11–17–3	(United States) Joe Lenhart	UD	6	2003-04-26	(United States) Las Vegas, Nevada, US	
Win	7–14–1	(United States) Ramon Hayes	UD	6	2002-09-29	(United States) Lemoore, California, US	
Win	25–5	(United States) Gary Winmon	TKO	2	2002-02-16	(United States) Las Vegas, Nevada, US	Referee stopped the bout at 1:45 of the second round.
Win	16–8	(The Bahamas) Reynaldo Minus	TKO	4	2001-09-28	(United States) Las Vegas, Nevada, US	Referee stopped the bout at 2:41 of the fourth round after Minus had been knocked down twice in the round.
Win	14–8–2	(United States) Harold Sconiers	KO	5	2001-07-06	(United States) Reno, Nevada, US	
Win	11–21–3	(United States) Louis Monaco	UD	8	2000-10-04	(United States) Canyonville, Oregon, US	
Win	8–8–3	(Mexico) Agustin Corpus	UD	6	2000-08-24	(United States) Worley, Idaho, US	
Win	6–6–2	(United States) Tim Pollard	TKO	1	2000-05-05	(United States) Las Vegas, Nevada, US	Referee stopped the bout at 2:10 of the first round.
Win	5–0	(United States) James Jones	UD	6	1999-07-01	(United States) Tunica, Mississippi, US	
Win	14–21–4	(United States) John Kiser	UD	8	1999-05-06	(United States) Tacoma, Washington, US	
Win	8–21–2	(United States) Terry Verners	TKO	1	1999-03-20	(United States) Tacoma, Washington, US	Referee stopped the fight at 2:24 of the first round.
Win	9–14–6	(United States) Wesley Martin	UD	6	1999-02-18	(United States) Bossier City, Louisiana, US	
Win	2–4	(Canada) Ritchie Goosehead	KO	3	1998-08-06	Slave Lake, Alberta, Canada	
Win	4–8	(United States) Anthony Moore	TKO	3	1998-06-27	Vancouver, British Columbia, Canada	
Win	3–4–1	(Canada) Dean Storey	KO	1	1998-05-08	Red Deer, Alberta, Canada	Storey knocked out at 2:14 of the first round.
Win	3–9–1	(Canada) Don Laliberte	KO	2	1998-02-13	Edmonton, Alberta, Canada	
Win	0–1	(United States) Dwight Staten	TKO	1	1998-01-23	(United States) Las Vegas, Nevada, US	Referee stopped the bout at 2:03 of the first round.
Win	3–5–1	(United States) Alonzo Hollis	UD	6	1997-03-04	Toronto, Ontario, Canada	
Win	0–1	(United States) Bill Dorsch	TKO	1	1996-10-19	Halifax, Nova Scotia, Canada	Referee stopped the bout at 2:34 of the first round.

== Death ==
Defiagbon died of heart complications in Las Vegas, Nevada on 24 November 2018. He was 48.
