= Adalat Mamedov =

Azerbaijani boxer

Personal information
- Nationality: Azerbaijani
- Born: 3 August 1974
- Died: 30 March 2003 (aged 28)

Sport
- Sport: Boxing
Medal record
Representing Azerbaijan
Junior World Championships
Bronze medal – third place	1992 Montreal	Super-heavyweight

Adalat Mamedov (3 August 1974 – 30 March 2003) was an Azerbaijani boxer. He competed in the men's super heavyweight event at the 1996 Summer Olympics.
