= Herzen =

Herzen is a surname. Notable people with the surname include:

- Alexander Herzen (1812–1870), writer
- Édouard Herzen (1877–1936), chemist
- Jana Herzen, singer

== See also ==
- 3052 Herzen, asteroid
- Flammende Herzen, 1977 album
- Herzen University
