= Jesús Guevara =

Venezuelan boxer

Personal information
- Full name: Jesús Guevara
- Nationality: Venezuela
- Born: December 15, 1969 (age 56)
- Height: 1.76 m (5 ft 9 in)
- Weight: 95 kg (209 lb)

Sport
- Sport: Boxing
- Weight class: Super Heavyweight

Jesús Guevara (born December 15, 1969) is a retired heavyweight boxer from Venezuela, who represented his native country at the 1996 Summer Olympics in Atlanta, Georgia. There he was eliminated in the first round of the men's super-heavyweight division (+ 91 kg) by Josué Blocus from France.
