= René Monse =

German boxer (1968–2017)

Personal information
- Full name: René Monse
- Nationality: German
- Born: 28 September 1968 Potsdam, East Germany
- Died: 8 June 2017 (aged 48)
- Height: 1.90 m (6 ft 3 in)
- Weight: 94 kg (207 lb)

Sport
- Sport: Boxing
- Weight class: Super Heavyweight
- Club: Berliner TSC, Berlin
Medal record
World Amateur Championships
Bronze medal – third place	1995 Berlin	Super Heavyweight
European Amateur Championships
Bronze medal – third place	1996 Vejle	Super Heavyweight

René Monse (28 September 1968 – 8 June 2017) was a German heavyweight boxer best known for having won a bronze medal at the world championships in 1995.

Monse died in 2017 after what his former promoter described as a lengthy illness.

== Amateur ==
In 1995, the southpaw won third place at the World Championships in Berlin after losing to Vitali Klitschko. He also placed third in the 1996 European Championships. At the Olympics, he lost to Russian star Alexei Lezin.

=== Amateur highlights ===
- East German Super Heavyweight Champion 1989, German Super Heavyweight Champion 1993, 1994
- 1990 3rd place at the World Cup in Dublin, Ireland. Lost the semifinal to Félix Savón (Cuba) by RET-1
- 1994 won the Military World Championships in Tunis, Tunisia with a Walkover win in the finalover Wladimir Klitschko (Ukraine).
- 1994 2nd place at the World Cup in Bangkok, Thailand. Results were:
  - Defeated Alexander Ermashevich (Belarus) PTS
  - Defeated Viktor Shtorm (Kazakhstan) PTS
  - Lost to Félix Savón RSC-4
- 1995 3rd place at the World Championships in Berlin, Germany. Lost the semifinal to Vitali Klitschko (Ukraine) PTS (5–6)
- 1995 3rd place at the Military World Championships in Rome, Italy. Results were:
  - Defeated Armen Khachatryan (Armenia) PTS (12–0)
  - Lost to Alexei Lezin (Russia) RSC-3
- 1996 competed at the Atlanta Olympics. Results were:
  - Defeated Said Ahmed Essayed (Egypt) PTS (12–9)
  - Lost to Alexei Lezin (Russia) PTS (5–9)
- 1996 3rd place at the European Championships in Vejle, Denmark. Lost the semifinal to Alexei Lezin (Russia).

== Pro ==
As a professional, he had only a few highlights. He lost by points against compatriot Luan Krasniqi for the vacant European title in 2002 even though he scored a knockdown. He was stopped in the rematch in 2004 and retired with a record of 14–2 with 7 knockouts.
