= David Bostice =

American boxer

David Bostice (born April 3, 1972) is an American former professional boxer. Nicknamed "The Boss", Bostice is known for being a regular fighter on ESPN fight cards, and is a heavyweight clubfighter who fought several significant fighters of his era.

== Early life ==
He was born in Los Angeles, California.

== Professional career ==
Bostice turned pro in 1996 and was relegated to being a heavyweight journeyman after a loss to Wladimir Klitschko in 2000. Bostice was often used as a gatekeeper for aspiring contenders to enter the heavyweight rankings.

He has been beaten by Calvin Brock, Luan Krasniqi, Jeremy Williams, Lou Savarese, and most recently Alexander Povetkin.

Bostice is featured in the line up of EA Sports' Knockout Kings 2001 for the PlayStation and PS2.

== Personal life ==
He lives in San Bernardino, California.

== Professional boxing record ==
37 Wins (15 knockouts, 22 decisions), 12 Losses (4 knockouts, 8 decisions), 1 Draw
| Result | Record | Opponent | Type | Round | Date | Location | Notes |
| Loss | 10-0 | (Russia) Alexander Povetkin | TKO | 2 | 2007-03-03 | Rostock, Germany | Referee stopped the bout at 2:57 of the second round. |
| Win | 12-13-1 | (United States) Earl Ladson | SD | 6 | 2007-02-09 | (United States) Manistee, Michigan, U.S. | |
| Win | 20-26-3 | (United States) Willie Chapman | SD | 6 | 2006-12-01 | (United States) Rochester, Minnesota, U.S. | |
| Loss | 28-2-1 | (Germany) Luan Krasniqi | UD | 10 | 2006-04-29 | Stuttgart, Germany | |
| Loss | 26-0 | (United States) Calvin Brock | UD | 12 | 2005-11-19 | (United States) Charlotte, North Carolina, U.S. | IBA Continental Heavyweight Title. |
| Win | 6-32 | (United States) Ronnie Smith | UD | 6 | 2005-10-01 | (United States) Dallas, Texas, U.S. | |
| Win | 4-5-2 | (United States) Patrick Smith | TKO | 3 | 2005-08-12 | (United States) Denver, Colorado, U.S. | Referee stopped the bout at 1:31 of the third round. |
| Loss | 20-0 | (United States) Malik Scott | UD | 8 | 2005-01-29 | (United States) Atlantic City, New Jersey, U.S. | |
| Win | 14-3-2 | (Mali) Cisse Salif | UD | 10 | Sep 23, 2004 | (United States) Temecula, California, U.S. | |
| Win | 16-2-3 | (New Zealand) Chauncy Welliver | UD | 10 | 2004-05-20 | (United States) Worley, Idaho, U.S. | |
| Loss | 7-4-1 | (United States) Maurice Wheeler | MD | 6 | 2004-02-21 | (United States) Reno, Nevada, U.S. | |
| Win | 17-9-2 | (Tonga) Sione Asipeli | UD | 6 | 2003-11-22 | (United States) Stateline, Nevada, U.S. | |
| Win | 16-17-1 | (United States) Jason Nicholson | UD | 6 | 2003-08-21 | (United States) Houston, Texas, U.S. | |
| Win | 6-29 | (United States) Ronnie Smith | UD | 6 | 2003-03-15 | (United States) Dallas, Texas, U.S. | |
| Win | 6-28 | (United States) Ronnie Smith | TKO | 3 | 2003-01-30 | (United States) Houston, Texas, U.S. | Referee stopped the bout at 0:10 of the third round. |
| Loss | 13-3-1 | (Mexico) Gilbert Martinez | UD | 10 | 2002-06-28 | (United States) Rancho Mirage, California, U.S. | |
| Loss | 36-4 | (United States) Jeremy Williams | KO | 1 | 2002-04-21 | (United States) Laughlin, Nevada, U.S. | Bostice knocked out at 2:59 of the first round. |
| Win | 37-22-4 | (United States) Frankie Swindell | UD | 8 | 2002-02-08 | (United States) Rancho Mirage, California, U.S. | |
| Loss | 41-4 | (United States) Lou Savarese | UD | 12 | 2001-11-02 | (United States) Mashantucket, Connecticut, U.S. | IBA Continental Heavyweight Title. |
| Win | 30-51-1 | (United States) Lorenzo Boyd | UD | 8 | 2001-07-20 | (United States) Pala, California, U.S. | |
| Loss | 42-3-1 | (South Africa) Francois Botha | UD | 10 | 2001-06-05 | (United States) Las Vegas, Nevada, U.S. | |
| Loss | 48-10-1 | (United States) Tim Witherspoon | TKO | 1 | 2001-02-22 | (United States) Harrisburg, Pennsylvania, U.S. | Referee stopped the bout at 2:21 of the first round. |
| Win | 31-6-2 | (United States) Al Cole | UD | 10 | 2000-12-08 | (United States) Las Vegas, Nevada, U.S. | |
| Win | 22-1-2 | (United States) Ed Mahone | UD | 10 | 2000-10-06 | (United States) Las Vegas, Nevada, U.S. | |
| Win | 13-7-2 | (United States) Terry Porter | KO | 1 | 2000-08-24 | (United States) Worley, Idaho, U.S. | Porter knocked out at 2:50 of the first round. |
| Loss | 32-1 | (Ukraine) Wladimir Klitschko | TKO | 2 | 2000-04-29 | (United States) New York City, U.S. | WBA Intercontinental Heavyweight Title. |
| Win | 12-6-3 | (United States) Zuri Lawrence | UD | 10 | 2000-03-02 | (United States) Rosemont, Illinois, U.S. | |
| Win | 33-21-2 | (Mexico) Mike Sedillo | UD | 10 | 2000-01-13 | (United States) Bay Saint Louis, Mississippi, U.S. | |
| Win | 6-9-2 | (Sudan) Clement Hassan | TKO | 7 | 1999-10-22 | (United States) Denver, Colorado, U.S. | |
| Win | 20-32-1 | (United States) Everett Martin | UD | 10 | 1999-10-07 | (United States) Mount Pleasant, Michigan, U.S. | |
| Win | 8-4 | (United States) Donald Hellyer | KO | 2 | 1999-08-13 | (United States) Bossier City, Louisiana, U.S. | |
| Loss | 14-8-4 | (Sierra Leone) Israel Cole | UD | 10 | 1999-06-17 | (United States) Worley, Idaho, U.S. | |
| Win | 12-14 | (United States) Isaac Brown | KO | 1 | 1999-04-28 | (United States) Newark, New Jersey, U.S. | |
| Win | 9-3 | (United States) Brian Nix | UD | 10 | 1999-04-01 | (United States) Worley, Idaho, U.S. | |
| Win | 6-10-2 | (United States) James Flowers | TKO | 5 | 1999-02-04 | (United States) Worley, Idaho, U.S. | |
| Win | 9-1 | (United States) Rodney Price | UD | 8 | 1999-01-07 | (United States) Tunica, Mississippi, U.S. | |
| Win | 14-21-3 | (United States) Lenzie Morgan | UD | 8 | 1998-11-07 | (United States) Bismarck, North Dakota, U.S. | |
| Win | 18-15-1 | (Mexico) Marcos Gonzalez | TKO | 1 | 1998-10-02 | (United States) Lake Charles, Louisiana, U.S. | Referee stopped the bout at 1:52 of the first round. |
| Win | 14-20-3 | (United States) Lenzie Morgan | UD | 6 | 1998-08-06 | (United States) Worley, Idaho, U.S. | |
| Win | 6-0 | (United States) Lovy Page | TKO | 3 | 1998-04-21 | (United States) Lake Charles, Louisiana, U.S. | Referee stopped the bout at 2:23 of the third round. |
| Win | 5-1 | (United States) Renard Jones | TKO | 1 | 1998-03-05 | (United States) Worley, Idaho, U.S. | Referee stopped the bout at 1:57 of the first round. |
| Win | 16-12-1 | (United States) Will Hinton | TKO | 4 | 1998-02-05 | (United States) Worley, Idaho, U.S. | Referee stopped the bout at 1:28 of the fourth round. |
| Win | -- | (United States) Milton Burrage | KO | 1 | 1997-12-12 | (United States) Waukegan, Illinois, U.S. | Burrage knocked out at 0:46 of the first round. |
| Win | 4-1-1 | (United States) Doug Liggion | PTS | 6 | 1997-11-06 | (United States) Biloxi, Mississippi, U.S. | |
| Win | 3-0 | (United States) Renard Jones | PTS | 6 | 1997-10-18 | (United States) Las Vegas, Nevada, U.S. | |
| Win | 3-0 | (United States) Juan Pablo Rodriguez | UD | 4 | 1997-09-10 | (United States) Las Vegas, Nevada, U.S. | |
| Win | 3-7-2 | (United States) Craig Brinson | KO | 2 | 1997-08-14 | (United States) Worley, Idaho, U.S. | |
| Draw | 4-0 | (United States) Maurice May | PTS | 4 | 1996-11-26 | (United States) Phoenix, Arizona, U.S. | |
| Win | 1-3 | (United States) Ricardo Phillips | TKO | 1 | 1996-06-04 | (United States) Las Vegas, Nevada, U.S. | |
| Win | -- | (United States) Clarence Garcia | TKO | 1 | 1996-05-30 | (United States) Phoenix, Arizona, U.S. | |
