= Mikhail Yurchenko =

Kazakhstani boxer (born 1970)

Personal information
- Full name: Михаил Юрченко
- Nationality: Kazakhstan
- Born: 20 June 1970 (age 56) Ushtobe, Kazakh SSR, Soviet Union
- Height: 1.95 m (6 ft 5 in)
- Weight: 107 kg (236 lb)

Sport
- Sport: Boxing
- Weight class: Super Heavyweight

Mikhail Yurchenko (Russian: Михаи́л Ю́рьевич Ю́рченко; born 20 June 1970) is a retired boxer from Kazakhstan, who competed for his native country in the Men's Super Heavyweight (+ 91 kg) division at the 1996 Summer Olympics in Atlanta, Georgia. There he was defeated in the second round by Russia's eventual bronze medalist Alexei Lezin.
