= Fola Okesola =

British boxer

Andy Agosto
Personal information
- Nationality: British
- Born: 16 April 1974 (age 52) Greenwich, London, UK
- Height: 6 ft 2 1/2 in (189 cm)
- Weight: Heavyweight

Boxing career

Boxing record
- Total fights: 5
- Wins: 3
- Win by KO: 3
- Losses: 2

Fola Okesola (born 16 April 1974) is a British boxer.

== Amateur career ==
He competed in the men's heavyweight event at the 1996 Summer Olympics.

== Professional boxing record ==
| 5 fights | 3 wins | 2 losses |
|---|---|---|
| By knockout | 3 | 1 |
| By decision | 0 | 1 |
