= Jiang Tao (boxer) =

Chinese boxer (born 1970)

Jiang Tao (江涛)
Personal information
- Born: April 16, 1970 (age 56) Jinzhai County, Anhui, China
Medal record
Men's boxing
Representing China
Asian Games
Bronze medal – third place	1994 Hiroshima	Heavyweight

Jiang Tao (born 16 April 1970) is a Chinese former amateur boxer. He participated in the 1996 Summer Olympics (Heavyweight - 91 kg division) where he defeated Uganda's Charles Kizza 10–7 before losing to American Nate Jones 4–21 in the quarterfinal. He was also the heavyweight champion at the 1995 Asian Amateur Boxing Championships and a bronze medalist at the 1994 Asian Games.
