= Igor Kshinin =

Russian boxer

Igor Ivanovich Kshinin (Russian: Игорь Иванович Кшинин; born 13 July 1972 in Volgograd) is a retired male boxer from Russia. He represented his native country at the 1996 Summer Olympics in Atlanta, where he was stopped in the second round of the men's heavyweight division (– 91 kg) by Germany's eventual bronze medalist Luan Krasniqi.
