= Sergey Dychkov =

Belarusian boxer (born 1976)

Personal information
- Nationality: Belarusian
- Born: 8 August 1976 (age 48); Rahachow, Byelorussian SSR, Soviet Union

Sport
- Sport: Boxing

Sergey Dychkov (born 8 August 1976) is a Belarusian boxer. He competed in the men's heavyweight event at the 1996 Summer Olympics.
