= Cathal O'Grady =

Irish boxer

Personal information
- Nationality: Irish
- Born: 6 March 1977 (age 48); Kildare, Ireland

Sport
- Sport: Boxing

Cathal O'Grady (born 6 March 1977) is an Irish former boxer. He competed in the men's heavyweight event at the 1996 Summer Olympics.
