= Petr Horáček =

Czech boxer

Personal information
- Nationality: Czech
- Born: 11 January 1974 (age 52) Prague, Czechoslovakia

Sport
- Sport: Boxing

Petr Horáček (born 11 January 1974) is a Czech boxer. He competed in the men's super heavyweight event at the 1996 Summer Olympics.

In December 2013, Horáček was hospitalized following a violent incident at a bar in Prague.
