= Kwamena Turkson =

Swedish boxer

Personal information
- Full name: Papa Kwamena Andze Turkson
- Nationality: Sweden
- Born: 17 January 1976 (age 50) Vetlanda, Sweden
- Height: 1.87 m (6 ft 1 1/2 in)
- Weight: 91 kg (201 lb)

Sport
- Sport: Boxing
- Weight class: Heavyweight
- Club: IF Rinkeby International
Medal record
European Amateur Championships
Bronze medal – third place	1996 Vejle	Heavyweight
Bronze medal – third place	1998 Minsk	Heavyweight

Papa Kwamena Andze Turkson (born 17 January 1976) is a retired male boxer from Sweden.

Turkson competed for his native country at the 1996 Summer Olympics in Atlanta, Georgia, where he was stopped in the second round of the men's heavyweight division (– 91 kg) by Cuba's defending champion and later gold medalist Félix Savón after a knock-out in the first round. He twice won a bronze medal during his amateur career at the European Championships.
