= Roberto Balado =

Cuban boxer (1969–1994)

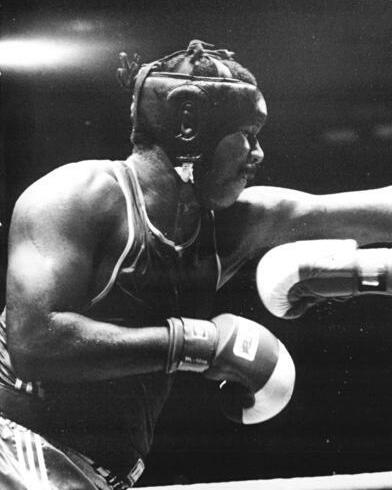
- Balado in 1990

Personal information
- Full name: Roberto Balado Mendez
- Nationality: Cuba
- Born: 15 February 1969 Jovellanos, Matanzas Province
- Died: 2 July 1994 (aged 25) Havana, Ciudad de la Habana
- Height: 1.83 m (6 ft 0 in)
- Weight: 100 kg (220 lb)

Sport
- Sport: Boxing
- Weight class: Super Heavyweight
Medal record
Event	1st	2nd	3rd
Olympic Games	1	0	0
World Championships	3	0	0
Youth World Championships	1	0	0
World Cup	2	0	0
Pan American Games	1	0	0
Central American and Caribbean Games	1	0	0
Central America and Caribbean Championships	1	0	0
Total	10	0	0
Olympic Games
Gold medal – first place	1992 Barcelona	Super Heavyweight
World Championships
Gold medal – first place	1989 Moscow	Super Heavyweight
Gold medal – first place	1991 Sydney	Super Heavyweight
Gold medal – first place	1993 Tampere	Super Heavyweight
Youth World Championships
Gold medal – first place	1987 Havana	Heavyweight
World Cup
Gold medal – first place	1990 Bombay	Super Heavyweight
Gold medal – first place	1994 Bangkok	Super Heavyweight
Pan American Games
Gold medal – first place	1991 Havana	Super Heavyweight
Central American and Caribbean Games
Gold medal – first place	1993 Ponce	Super Heavyweight
Central America and Caribbean Championships
Gold medal – first place	1987 San José	Heavyweight

Roberto Balado Méndez (15 February 1969 – 2 July 1994) was a Cuban amateur boxer, who competed from 1986 to 1994. At the 1992 Summer Olympics he won a Gold medal in the men's super heavyweight (+91 kg).

A natural heavyweight, he was Olympic champion (Barcelona 1992), three times world champion (Moscow 1989, Sydney 1991, and Tampere 1993), and five times Cuban national champion. He was also the winner of the Val Barker Trophy for Outstanding Boxer at the 1992 Olympic Games.

Balado was at his prime, looking forward to win many forthcoming events, considered by some boxing experts to be the world's second-best fighter after Félix Savón (who competed one weight division below), and being one of the favourites of the 1995 Pan American Games and 1996 Olympics, but died in a car accident.

At the time of his death, age 25, he had 250 fights, with a record of 238 victories, and 12 losses.

== Early years ==
Balado was born in Jovellanos, Matanzas, on 15 February 1969. Before his first birthday, the family came to live in Old Havana and shortly thereafter they moved to the El Palenque neighborhood (La Lisa), next to the La Lisa bridge.

He was 14 when he took up boxing, and soon participated in the National School Games.

== Career ==
In 1984, Cuba's long-time Olympic heavyweight Teófilo Stevenson, although retaining physical strength and staying in shape, and even aspiring to win the fourth gold medal in the 1984 Olympic Games (which Cuba ultimately boycotted,) already needed to pass the torch and find a suitable alternate for the Cuban National Boxing Team.

Raúl Fernández's promotional transfer to the Orbeín Quesada training center, headquarters of the National Athletic Selection, played a decisive role in the formation and subsequent consecration of Balado.

Regarding the Balado's ascent to the national team, Alcides Sagarra pointed out: "Raúl spoke with me of the boy and without any hesitation I agreed to get him trained in the 'Finca.' He began to show progress and very soon his was something more than just learning. He was always willing to help in the sparrings, and he didn't care about the name of the opponent in front of him."

Cuban sport officials questioned the decision to include Balado as the Cuban representative in the superheavyweight class to compete at the 1989 World Championships in Moscow, but he proved the critics wrong and won the event.

== Highlights ==
(silver) XXV Playa Girón National Championships (91 kg), San Jose de las Lajas, Cuba, January 1986:

- 1/8: Defeated Ambrosio Moro (Cuba) RSCH 2
- 1/4: Defeated Wilder Cervantes (Cuba) by unanimous decision, 5–0
- 1/2: Defeated Francisco Bouly (Cuba) by unanimous decision, 5–0
- Finals: Lost to Félix Savón (Cuba) KO 2

(gold) Golden Belt Tournament (91 kg), Bucharest, Romania, 1986:

- Finals: Defeated Svilen Rusinov (Bulgaria)

(gold) XXII Friendship Games (+81 kg), Szolnok, Hungary, August 1986:

- Finals: Defeated Tigran Terterian (Soviet Union) RSC 1

(silver) XXVI Playa Girón National Championships (91 kg), Holguín, Cuba, January 1987:

- 1/16: Defeated Alberto Almeida (Cuba) RSCH 1
- 1/8: Defeated Reinaldo Dreke (Cuba) RSC 1
- 1/4: Defeated Juan Cause Delis (Cuba) by unanimous decision, 5–0
- 1/2: Defeated Victor Ispuria (Cuba) by unanimous decision, 5–0
- Finals: Lost to Félix Savón (Cuba) by unanimous decision, 0–5

Gee-Bee Tournament (91 kg), Helsinki, Finland, April 1987:

- Defeated Georgy Likov (Bulgaria) by decision
- Defeated Gytis Juškevičius (Soviet Union) KO 3
- Lost to Yevgeniy Sudakov (Soviet Union) by unanimous decision, 0–5

(gold) Intercup (91 kg), Hemsbach, West Germany, April 1987:

- 1/2: Defeated Wiesław Dyła (Poland) by unanimous decision, 5–0
- Finals: Defeated Fred Kaddu (Uganda) by unanimous decision, 5–0

(gold) Golden Belt Tournament (91 kg), Bucharest, Romania, 1987:

- Finals: Defeated Petr Bornescu (Romania) by decision

(gold) IV Youth World Championships (91 kg), Havana, Cuba, June 1987:

- 1/4: Defeated Frank Beckström (East Germany) RSC 1
- 1/2: Defeated Peter Stettinger (West Germany) RSC 3
- Finals: Defeated Vyacheslav Sedov (Soviet Union) RSC 3

(gold) Simón Bolivar Cup (+81 kg), Caracas, Venezuela, September 1987:

- Finals: Defeated A. Golotyan (Soviet Union) by unanimous decision, 5–0

(gold) XVIII Central America and the Caribbean Championships (91 kg), San José, Costa Rica, November 1987:

- Finals: Defeated Emilio Payne (Costa Rica) RSC 2

(silver) XXVII Playa Girón National Championships (91 kg), Sancti Spiritus, Cuba, January 1988:

- 1/8: Defeated Pedro Montalvo (Cuba) by majority decision, 4–1
- 1/4: Defeated Daniel Alonso Zamora (Cuba) by unanimous decision, 5–0
- 1/2: Defeated Juan Cause Delis (Cuba) by split decision, 3–2
- Finals: Lost to Félix Savón (Cuba) by unanimous decision, 0–5

(silver) XXXIX Strandzha Cup (91 kg), Sofia, Bulgaria, February 1988:

- 1/2: Defeated Svilen Rusinov (Bulgaria) by majority decision, 4–1
- Finals: Lost to Andrzej Golota (Poland) by split decision, 2–3

(silver) XXVIII Playa Girón National Championships (91 kg), Guantánamo, Cuba, January 1989:

- 1/16: Defeated Jose Sayu (Cuba) RSC 2
- 1/8: Defeated Pedro Montalvo (Cuba) by unanimous decision, 5–0
- 1/4: Defeated Raul Gonzalez (Cuba) RET 2
- 1/2: Defeated Juan Cause Delis (Cuba) by unanimous decision, 5–0
- Finals: Lost to Félix Savón (Cuba) by unanimous decision, 0–5

(gold) XXII Giraldo Córdova Cardín Tournament (+91 kg), Pinar del Río, Cuba, June 1989:

- 1/4: Defeated Sergey Kravchenko (Soviet Union) by decision
- 1/2: Defeated Roberto Camilo (Cuba) by decision
- Finals: Defeated Armando Camouzano (Cuba) by decision

(gold) VII Military Spartakiad of the Friendly Armies of the Socialist Countries (+91 kg), Sliven, Bulgaria, June 1989:

- Finals: Defeated Sergey Kravchenko (Soviet Union) by majority decision, 4–1

(gold) World Championships (+91 kg), Moscow, Soviet Union, September 1989:

- 1/4: Defeated Svilen Rusinov (Bulgaria) 23–6
- 1/2: Defeated Maik Heydeck (West Germany) 20–2
- Finals: Defeated Aleksandr Miroshnichenko (Soviet Union) 18–9 (Balado knocked down at 1:30 of the 3rd rd)

(gold) XXIX Playa Girón National Championships (+91 kg), Cienfuegos, Cuba, January 1990:

- 1/8: Defeated Livan Álvarez (Cuba) 33–7
- 1/4: Defeated Osvaldo Castillo (Cuba) RSC 3
- 1/2: Defeated Fidel César (Cuba) PTS
- Finals: Defeated Armando Camouzano (Cuba) 61–23

AIBA World Championships Challenge (+91 kg), Berlin, Germany, March 1990:

- Defeated Larry Donald (United States) 51–20 (5 rds)

XXIII Giraldo Córdova Cardín Tournament (+91 kg), Manzanillo, Cuba, May 1990:

- 1/8: Defeated Adonis Conti (Cuba) KO 1
- 1/4: Lost to Roberto Camilo (Cuba) DQ 2

U.S. Olympic Cup, North America–Europe Duals (+91 kg), Exhibition Hall, Salt Lake City, Utah, June 1990:

- Defeated Bert Teuchert (Germany) by unanimous decision, 3–0 (5 rds)

II Goodwill Games (+91 kg), Seattle, Washington, July 1990:

- 1/4: Lost to Yevgeniy Belousov (Soviet Union) RSCI 1 (Balado badly cut in the corner of right eye leading the referee to stop the bout)

(silver) TSC Tournament (+91 kg), Berlin, East Germany, October 1990:

- 1/2: Defeated Arnold Vanderlyde (Netherlands) 30–27
- Finals: Lost to Maik Heydeck (Germany) 23–26

(gold) IV World Cup (+91 kg), Bombay, India, November 1990:

- 1/8: Defeated Maik Heydeck (Germany) PTS (5 rds)
- 1/4: Defeated Raj Kumar Sangwan (India) PTS (5 rds)
- 1/2: Defeated Vernon Linklater (Canada) RET 3
- Finals: Defeated Svilen Rusinov (Bulgaria) 18–12

(gold) XXX Playa Girón National Championships (+91 kg), Camagüey, Cuba, January 1991:

- 1/16: Defeated Ramon Marino (Cuba) RSC 1
- 1/8: Defeated Juan Quesada (Cuba) 25–5
- 1/4: Defeated Adonis Conti (Cuba) 35–6
- 1/2: Defeated Alexis Rubalcaba (Cuba) 14–5
- Finals: Defeated Armando Camouzano (Cuba) 16–9

AIBA World Championships Challenge (+91 kg), Bangkok, Thailand, February 1991:

- Defeated Vartan Vartanyan (Soviet Union) 45–12 (5 rds)

(gold) King's Cup (+91 kg), Bangkok, Thailand, April 1991

- Finals: Defeated (no data available)

(gold) XXIV Giraldo Córdova Cardín Tournament (+91 kg), Sancti Spiritus, Cuba, June 1991:

- 1/4: Defeated Freddy Reguerifero (Cuba) 26–0
- 1/2: Defeated Roberto Camilo (Cuba) 18–3
- Finals: Defeated Juan Cause Delis (Cuba) 6–4

(gold) XI Pan American Games (+91 kg), Havana, Cuba, August 1991:

- 1/4: Defeated Samson Poʻuha (United States) 15–7
- 1/2: Defeated Elio Ibarra (Argentina) PTS
- Finals: Defeated Harold Arroyo (Puerto Rico) KO 1 (1:39)

(gold) World Championships (+91 kg), Sydney, Australia, November 1991:

- 1/4: Defeated Andreas Schnieders (Germany) RSC 1
- 1/2: Defeated Svilen Rusinov (Bulgaria) 21–7
- Finals: Defeated Yevgeniy Belousov (Soviet Union) 20–12

XXXI Playa Girón National Championships (+91 kg), Pinar del Río, Cuba, January 1992:

- 1/16: Defeated Adonis Conti (Cuba) 34–7
- 1/8: Defeated Osvaldo Castillo (Cuba) 19–0
- 1/4: Defeated Luis Lazaro Ulacia (Cuba) 13–2
- 1/2: Defeated Armando Campuzano (Cuba) 11–1
- Finals: Not contested Leonardo Martínez Fizz (Cuba)

(gold) BOXAM Cup (+91 kg), Barcelona, Spain, February 1992:

- 1/2: Defeated Tom Glesby (Canada) 9–3
- Finals: Defeated José Ortega (Spain) RSC 2

AIBA World Championships Challenge (+91 kg), Tampa, Florida, March 1992:

- Lost to Larry Donald (United States) 14–16 (5 rds)

(gold) XXV Giraldo Córdova Cardín Tournament (+91 kg), Santiago de Cuba, Cuba, May 1992:

- 1/8: Defeated Juan Cause Delis (Cuba) 7–1
- 1/4: Defeated Alexis Rubalcaba (Cuba) 8–2
- 1/2: Defeated Adonis Conti (Cuba) 23–11
- Finals: Defeated Osvaldo Castillo (Cuba) 21–4

(gold) XXV Summer Olympics (+91 kg), Barcelona, Spain, July 1992:

- 1/16: Defeated Tom Glesby (Canada) 16–2
- 1/4: Defeated Larry Donald (United States) 10–4
- 1/2: Defeated Brian Nielsen (Denmark) 15–1
- Finals: Defeated Richard Igbineghu (Nigeria) 13–2 (won the Outstanding Boxer trophy)

(gold) XXXII Playa Girón National Championships (+91 kg), Matanzas, Cuba, January 1993:

- 1/8: Defeated Arnaldo Alfonso (Cuba) 24–0
- 1/4: Defeated Frank González (Cuba) RSC 1 (1:44)
- 1/2: Defeated Luis Lazaro Ulacia (Cuba) 14–5
- Finals: Defeated Roberto Camilo (Cuba) 11–0

AIBA World Championships Challenge (+91 kg), Istanbul, Turkey, February 1993:

- Defeated Richard Igbineghu (Nigeria) 13–5 (5 rds)

Europe–North America Duals (+91 kg), Berlin, Germany, March 1993:

- Defeated Svilen Rusinov (Bulgaria) 6–0

(gold) XXVI Giraldo Córdova Cardín Tournament (+91 kg), Sancti Spiritus, Cuba, May 1993:

- 1/4: Defeated Osvaldo Castillo (Cuba) 5–0
- 1/2: Defeated Leonardo Enrich (Cuba) 6–0
- Finals: Defeated Armando Camouzano (Cuba) 8–2

(gold) VII World Championships (+91 kg), Tampere, Finland, June 1993:

- 1/8: Defeated Jerry Nijman (Netherlands) 13–1
- 1/4: Defeated Joel Scott (United States) 8–0
- 1/2: Defeated Oleg Maskaev (Uzbekistan) KO 3
- Finals: Defeated Svilen Rusinov (Bulgaria) 10–1

Cuba–USA Duals (+91 kg), Mississippi Coast Coliseum, Biloxi, Mississippi, September 1993:

- Defeated Ed Mahone (United States) by unanimous decision, 5–0

(gold) XVII Central American and Caribbean Games (+91 kg), Ponce, Puerto Rico, November 1993:

- 1/4: Defeated Harold Arroyo (Puerto Rico) RSCH 1
- 1/2: Defeated Anibal González (Dominican Republic) RSC 1
- Finals: Defeated Rómulo Suárez (Venezuela) RSC 1

XXXIII Playa Girón National Championships (+91 kg), Ciego de Avila, Cuba, January 1994:

- 1/8: Defeated Isbey Rodriguez (Cuba) RSC 2
- 1/4: Defeated Juan Ortega (Cuba) RET 2
- 1/2: Defeated Luis Lazaro Ulacia (Cuba) 8–2
- Finals: Not contested Leonardo Martínez Fizz (Cuba)

AIBA World Championships Challenge (+91 kg), Dublin, Ireland, March 1994:

- Defeated Yevgeniy Belousov (Russia) by split decision, 3–2 (5 rds)

(gold) XXVII Giraldo Córdova Cardín Tournament (+91 kg), Cienfuegos, Cuba, May 1994:

- 1/2: Defeated Raj Kumar Sangwan (India) RET 1
- Finals: Defeated Luis Lazaro Ulacia (Cuba) PTS

(gold) VIII World Cup (+91 kg), Bangkok, Thailand, June 1994:

- 1/8: Defeated Christophe Mendy (France) 24–4 (5 rds)
- 1/4: Defeated Mikhail Yurchenko (Kazakhstan) 18–10 (5 rds)
- 1/2: Defeated Svilen Rusinov (Bulgaria) 13–6 (5 rds)
- Finals: Defeated Oleg Maskaev (Uzbekistan) by walkover

== Death ==
On 2 July 1994, Roberto Balado was driving to train at the headquarters of the Cuban team at the Holveín Quesada National School of Boxing (Escuela Nacional de Boxeo "Holveín Quesada",) but didn't make it as he died in a crash at a train crossing in Havana.
