= Aleksandr Miroshnichenko =

Kazakhstani boxer

Aleksandr Miroshnichenko Александр Мирошниченко
Personal information
- Nationality: Kazakhstan
- Born: Aleksandr Viktorovich; Miroshnichenko; 26 April 1964 Kostanay, Kazakh SSR, Soviet Union
- Died: 19 May 2003 (aged 39) Kostanay, Kazakhstan
- Height: 1.93 m (6 ft 4 in)
- Weight: Heavyweight

Boxing career

Boxing record
- Total fights: 22
- Wins: 21
- Win by KO: 15
- Losses: 1
Medal record
Men's amateur boxing
Representing Soviet Union
Olympic Games
Bronze medal – third place	1988 Seoul	Super-heavyweight
World Championships
Silver medal – second place	1989 Moscow	Super-heavyweight
European Championships
Bronze medal – third place	1983 Varna	Super-heavyweight
Bronze medal – third place	1989 Athens	Super-heavyweight
Goodwill Games
Silver medal – second place	1986 Moscow	Super-heavyweight
World Cup
Bronze medal – third place	1983 Rome	Super-heavyweight

Aleksandr Viktorovich "Alex" Miroshnichenko (Russian: Александр Викторович Мирошниченко; 26 April 1964 – 19 May 2003) was a Russian-Kazakh professional boxer. As an amateur he represented the Soviet Union at the 1988 Summer Olympics, winning a bronze medal in the super-heavyweight division.

His other accomplishments included silver at the 1989 World Championships, as well as bronze at the 1983 and 1989 European Championships, and other international tournaments.

== Early years ==
Miroshnichenko took up boxing at the age of 13, at the strong insistence of his mother, who thought that her son must be able to defend himself, and brought him to the gym at his hometown of Kostanay. Miroshnichenko shown little interest in boxing, but had a natural talent and considerable ability to compete both nationally and internationally, which he did during the 1980s. He was ranked world's #6 super heavyweight by the AIBA in 1984.

== Amateur career ==
Punch statistics for the Bowe vs. Miroshnichenko at the 1988 Summer Olympics
Punches		1st round	2nd round	3rd round	Total
Thrown	Bowe	68	102	127	297
Thrown	Miroshnichenko	57	37	49	143
Landed	Bowe	8	32	48	88
Landed	Miroshnichenko	21	17	10	48
Percent	Bowe	12%	31%	38%	30%
Percent	Miroshnichenko	37%	46%	20%	34%

External videos
- Bowe vs. Miroshnichenko, second meet at the 1988 Olympics

Aside from his Olympic performance, Miroshnichenko had a distinguished amateur career, winning 210 out of 233 bouts, including a win over future world heavyweight champion Lennox Lewis and 1984 U.S. Army and inter-service champion Wesley Watson. He won medals in the European Championships and the World Cup, and was a three-time Soviet champion. He represented the Dynamo Sports Society. At the 1988 Olympics semifinals Miroshnichenko floored U.S. Riddick Bowe momentarily in the first round, but Bowe managed to win by the decision. Despite Miroshnichenko's loss to Bowe, Lou Falcigno, a New York-based boxing promoter of Momentum Enterprises, Inc., expressed a particular interest in bringing him to the United States to fight professionally. Negotiations began between the promoter and the Soviet Boxing Federation and Sovintersport, the entity responsible for the commercialization of Soviet sports, but proven unsuccessful as the Soviet government dismissed the idea early in 1989.

=== Highlights ===
(silver) President's Cup, Jakarta, Indonesia, February 1982:

- Finals: Lost to Francesco Damiani (Italy)

(silver) Friendship Tournament, Ústí nad Labem, Czechoslovakia, July 1982:

- 1/2: Defeated Bohumil Hruška (Czechoslovakia) KO 1
- Finals: Lost to Sven Karberg (East Germany) by walkover

(bronze) European Championships, Varna, Bulgaria, May 1983:

- 1/4: Defeated Olaf Mayer (Austria) by unanimous decision, 5–0
- 1/2: Lost to Ulli Kaden (East Germany) by unanimous decision, 0–5

(bronze) World Cup, Rome, Italy, October 1983:

- 1/2: Lost to Craig Payne (United States) by unanimous decision, 0–5

(silver) Giraldo Córdova Cardín, Ciego de Ávila, Cuba, June 1985:

- 1/2: Defeated Roberto Gómez (Cuba)
- Finals: Lost to Jorge Luis González (Cuba) RSC 3

(silver) Goodwill Games, Moscow, Soviet Union, July 1986:

- 1/2: Defeated Ali Al-Baluchi (Kuwait) by unanimous decision, 5–0
- Finals: Lost to Vyacheslav Yakovlev (Soviet Union) by majority decision, 1–4

USA−USSR Middle & Heavy Duals, ARCO Arena, Sacramento, California, July 1986:

- Defeated Wesley Watson (United States) KO 1 (1:01)

USA−USSR Exhibition, Houston, Texas, August 1986:

- Defeated Troy Baudoin (United States) RSC 2 (1:48)

(silver) InterCup, Hemsbach, West Germany, April 1987:

- Finals: Lost to Janusz Zarenkiewicz (Poland) DQ 2

USA−USSR Heavy Duals, University of South Florida, Tampa, Florida, June 1987:

- Defeated George Kilbert Pierce (United States) by unanimous decision, 3–0

(gold) Socialist Countries Police Championships, Pyongyang, North Korea, August 1987:

- Finals: Defeated Peter Hrivňák (Czechoslovakia) RET 1

(silver) TSC Tournament, Werner-Seelenbinder-Halle, Berlin, East Germany, September 1987:

- 1/4: Defeated Lino Pairol (Cuba)
- 1/2: Defeated István Szikora (Hungary) RET 3
- Finals: Lost to Ulli Kaden by unanimous decision, 0–5

(gold) InterCup, Karlsruhe, West Germany, April 1988:

- Finals: Defeated Lennox Lewis (Canada) by unanimous decision, 5–0

Olympic SuperHeavy qualifications, Karlsruhe, West Germany, April 1988:

- 1/4: Defeated István Szikora (Hungary) by decision
- 1/2: Defeated Azis Salihu (Yugoslavia)
- Finals: Defeated Janusz Zarenkiewicz (Poland) by walkover

Pre-Olympic Tournament, Seoul, South Korea, March 1988:

- Defeated Ulli Kaden (East Germany) by split decision, 3–2

USSR−USA Duals, Moscow, Soviet Union, 1988:

- Defeated Riddick Bowe (United States) by decision

(bronze) Summer Olympics, Seoul, South Korea, September 1988:

- 1/8: Defeated Ali Al-Baluchi (Kuwait) by unanimous decision, 5–0
- 1/4: Defeated Kim Yoo-Hyun (South Korea) by unanimous decision, 5–0
- 1/2: Lost to Riddick Bowe (United States) by unanimous decision, 0–5 (Bowe knocked down at 2:16 of the 1st rd; Bowe was given a standing eight count at 2:35 of the 1st rd; Miroshnichenko had his mouthpiece knocked off at 0:30 of the 3rd rd; Miroshnichenko was given a standing eight count at 1:10 and 1:35 of the 3rd rd)

(bronze) European Championships, Athens, Greece, May 1989:

- 1/8: Defeated Pekka Viippo (Finland) KO 1
- 1/4: Defeated Janusz Zarenkiewicz (Poland) KO 2
- 1/2: Lost to Ulli Kaden (East Germany) by majority decision, 1–4

(silver) World Championships, Moscow, Soviet Union, September–October 1989:

- 1/4: Defeated Andreas Schnieders (West Germany) RSCH 2
- 1/2: Defeated Ladislav Husarik (Czechoslovakia) on points, 19–5
- Finals: Lost to Roberto Balado (Cuba) on points, 9–18 (Balado knocked down at 1:30 of the 3rd rd)

He had 233 fights as an amateur, finishing his amateur career with a record of 210–23.

== Professional career ==
Miroshnichenko turned pro in 1990, at the very advent of professional boxing in the late Soviet Union, and had limited success. He began his career by knocking out Roberto Servin in the first round. In Miroshnichenko's third fight, he stopped future WBC International Champion, Ross Puritty.

In 1991, Miroshnichenko won the vacant Russian Heavyweight title from Nurlan Dzhanibekov. After vacating the Russian title in 1992, Miroshnichenko won a very close Split Decision against Samuel M'Bendjob by only one point. In 1993, Miroshnichenko beat former IBF Cruiserweight Champion, Ricky Parkey in an impressive third round Knockout.

After 21 consecutive wins against limited competition, Miroshnichenko was finally defeated by Oleg Maskaev in 1993 in Maskaev's first pro fight: a TKO in the third round. Miroshnichenko's cornermen later told that he entered the bout with his arm fractured. Miroshnichenko retired after the bout.

== Retirement and later years ==
Upon his retirement from competition, he opened a state-sponsored boxing school for youth, and worked as a chief boxing coach of the Kostanay Region in 2000-2002. He also helped to establish the school of martial arts at the Kostanay State University (the only martial arts higher education unit in Kazakhstan,) which he headed as a dean until his death.

== Death ==
Miroshnichenko died under unclear circumstances in 2003, aged 39, after supposedly falling down nine flights of stairs at his apartment building in his hometown. Rumours initially circulated that his death was related to his testimony in the trial of a local judge, but local prosecutor's office later ruled his death was most probably accidental, and case was closed.

== Professional boxing record ==
22 fights	21 wins	1 loss
By knockout	15	1
By decision	6	0

No.	Result	Record	Opponent	Opp Record	Type	Round, time	Date	Location	Notes
22	Loss	21–1	(Uzbekistan) Oleg Maskaev	debut	TKO	3 (6)	17 Apr 1993	Taraz, Kazakhstan	
21	Win	21–0	(United States) Ricky Parkey	22–15–0	KO	3	20 Mar 1993	Philips Halle, Düsseldorf, Germany	
20	Win	20–0	(Zambia) Michael Simuwelu	18–4–1	PTS	8	19 Dec 1992	Berlin, Germany	
19	Win	19–0	(Cameroon) Samuel M'Bendjob	6–3–0	SD	8	3 Dec 1992	Rotterdam Ahoy Sportpaleis, Rotterdam, Netherlands	79–77, 77–76, 76–78
18	Win	18–0	(Russia) Oleg Ushakov	debut	PTS	8	18 Oct 1992	Alma-Ata, Kazakhstan	
17	Win	17–0	(Colombia) Carlos Pena	0–1–0	KO	1	2 Oct 1992	Waregem, West Flanders, Belgium	
16	Win	16-0	(United States) Mike Cohen	30–18–0	KO	2 (6)	19 Sep 1992	Kassel, Hesse, Germany	
15	Win	15–0	(Russia) Nurlan Dzhanibekov	0–4–0	KO	1 (8)	23 Aug 1992	Semipalatinsk, Kazakhstan	
14	Wi	14–0	(Kazakhstan) Yevgeniy Tulenov	debut	KO	2 (8)	8 Aug 1992	Rudniy, Kazakhstan	
13	Win	13–0	(United Kingdom) Steve Garber	18–16–1	TKO	1 (8)	8 May 1992	Waregem, West Flanders, Belgium	
12	Win	12–0	(Netherlands Antilles) Albert Johnson	debut	TKO	1 (10)	1 Feb 1992	Willemstad, Curacao, Netherlands Antilles	
11	Win	11–0	(Russian Soviet Federative Socialist Republic) Nurlan Dzhanibekov	0–2–0	KO	4 (10)	7 Dec 1991	(Kazakh Soviet Socialist Republic) Rudniy, Kazakh SSR	Won vacant Russian Heavyweight title
10	Win	10–0	(United States) James Holly	3–23–0	KO	2	28 Oct 1991	Arnhem, Netherlands	
9	Win	9–0	(Russian Soviet Federative Socialist Republic) Nurlan Dzhanibekov	0–1–0	PTS	8	26 Sep 1991	(Kazakh Soviet Socialist Republic) Karaganda, Kazakh SSR	
8	Win	8–0	(Kazakh Soviet Socialist Republic) Vladimir Guguchkin	0–1–0	TKO	6 (8)	4 Sep 1991	(Kazakh Soviet Socialist Republic) Alma-Ata, Kazakh SSR	
7	Win	7–0	(Kazakh Soviet Socialist Republic) Pyotr Skok	debut	TKO	8 (8)	7 Jul 1991	(Kazakh Soviet Socialist Republic) Pavlodar, Kazakh SSR	
6	Win	6–0	(Kazakh Soviet Socialist Republic) Igor Shklyaruk	debut	TKO	4 (8)	18 May 1991	(Kazakh Soviet Socialist Republic) Semipalatinsk, Kazakh SSR	
5	Win	5–0	(Armenian Soviet Socialist Republic) Vazgen Ayvazyan	debut	PTS	8	17 Mar 1991	(Russian Soviet Federative Socialist Republic) Kemerovo, RSFSR	
4	Win	4–0	(Russian Soviet Federative Socialist Republic) Viktor Aldoshin	debut	TKO	4 (6)	16 Jan 1991	Tokyo, Japan	
3	Win	3–0	(United States) Ross Puritty	3–1–0	RTD	6 (8)	29 Oct 1990	Korakuen Hall, Tokyo, Japan	
2	Win	2–0	(Mexico) Juan Hernández	3–11–0	PTS	6	20 Aug 1990	Tokyo, Japan	
1	Win	1–0	(Mexico) Roberto Servin	1–1–1	KO	1 (6), 2:27	23 Jun 1990	Korakuen Hall, Tokyo, Japan	Professional debut

== Memory ==
Alexandr Miroshnichenko Memorial annual junior boxing tournament has been established in his hometown of Kostanay.

Preceded by Arkady Kharlampiyev (before the October Revolution)	Russian Heavyweight Champion; 7 December 1991 – 16 July 1993; Retired	Succeeded by Vladimir Yelbaev
