= Boxing at the 1988 Summer Olympics – Super heavyweight =

Olympic boxing tournament

Super heavyweight boxing at the Games of the XXIV Olympiad
- Venue: Chamshil Students' Gymnasium
- Dates: 22 September – 2 October 1988
- Competitors: 17 from 17 nations

Medalists
1st place, gold medalist(s)		Lennox Lewis	Canada
2nd place, silver medalist(s)		Riddick Bowe	United States
3rd place, bronze medalist(s)		Aleksandr Miroshnichenko	Soviet Union
3rd place, bronze medalist(s)		Janusz Zarenkiewicz	Poland

The men's super heavyweight event was part of the boxing programme at the 1988 Summer Olympics. The weight class allowed boxers of more than 91 kilograms to compete. The competition was held from 22 September to 2 October 1988. 17 boxers from 17 nations competed.

Future world heavyweight champion 23-year-old Lennox Lewis of Canada defeated 21-year-old Riddick Bowe of the US in the final.

== Background ==
The super heavyweight event of the 1988 Olympics was weakened by the absence of a Cuban boxer. Teófilo Stevenson, a veteran three-time Olympic champion whose first Olympics were back in 1972, did not retire anticipating these Olympics. He announced his retirement shortly after the Cuban government decided to boycott the Games. He was 36 years of age in 1988. In contrast, future finalists Lewis and Bowe were rather young, 23 and 21 years old respectively. Possible Cuban alternate Jorge Luis González, 24, had defeated both Bowe and Lewis at the 1987 Pan American Games.

It was predicted that the gold medal would be contested between the North Americans Lennox Lewis and Riddick Bowe and Europeans Ulli Kaden and Alex Miroshnichenko.

== Medalists ==
Gold	Lennox Lewis; Canada
Silver	Riddick Bowe; United States
Bronze	Aleksandr Miroshnichenko; Soviet Union
Bronze	Janusz Zarenkiewicz; Poland

== Results ==
The following boxers took part in the event:

Rank	Name	Country
1	Lennox Lewis	Canada
2	Riddick Bowe	United States
3T	Aleksandr Miroshnichenko	Soviet Union
3T	Janusz Zarenkiewicz	Poland
5T	Kim Yu-hyeon	South Korea
5T	Peter Hrivňák	Czechoslovakia
5T	Ulli Kaden	East Germany
5T	Andreas Schnieders	West Germany
9T	Ali Al-Baluchi	Kuwait
9T	Mohamed Hammad	Sudan
9T	Petar Stoimenov	Bulgaria
9T	Biko Botowamungu	Austria
9T	Crispine Odera	Kenya
9T	Aziz Salihu	Yugoslavia
9T	Harold Arroyo	Puerto Rico
9T	Ovwigbo Uba	Nigeria
17T	Tshibalabala Kadima	Zaire

=== First round ===
- Andreas Schnieders (FRG) def. Tshibalabala Kadima (ZAI), RSC-2

=== Second round ===
- Aleksandr Miroshnichenko (URS) def. Ali Al-Baluchi (KUW), 5:0
- Kim Yoo-Hyun (KOR) def. Mohamed Hammad (SUD), AB-1
- Peter Hrivnák (TCH) def. Petar Stoimenov (BUL), RSC-2
- Riddick Bowe (USA) def. Biko Botowamungu (AUT), KO-2
- Lennox Lewis (CAN) def. Chris Odera (KEN), RSC-2
- Ulli Kaden (GDR) def. Aziz Salihu (YUG), 5:0
- Janusz Zarenkiewicz (POL) def. Harold Arroyo (PUR), 5:0
- Andreas Schnieders (FRG) def. Ubola Ovvigbo (NGA), 5:0

=== Quarterfinals ===
- Aleksandr Miroshnichenko (URS) def. Kim Yoo-Hyun (KOR), 5:0
- Riddick Bowe (USA) def. Peter Hrivnák (TCH), RSC-1
- Lennox Lewis (CAN) def. Ulli Kaden (GDR), RSC-1
- Janusz Zarenkiewicz (POL) def. Andreas Schnieders (FRG), 3:2

=== Semifinals ===
- Riddick Bowe (USA) def. Aleksandr Miroshnichenko (URS), 5:0
- Lennox Lewis (CAN) def. Janusz Zarenkiewicz (POL), walk-over

=== Final ===
- Lennox Lewis (CAN) def. Riddick Bowe (USA), RSC-2

Bowe was the more effective fighter in the first round, landing 33 of 94 punches thrown (34%) while Lewis landed 14 of 67 (21%). In the first round the referee from East Germany gave Bowe two cautions for headbutts and deducted a point for a third headbutt. Commentator Ferdie Pacheco disagreed with the deduction, saying they did not hit heads. In the second round, Lewis landed several hard punches. The referee gave Bowe two standing eight counts and waved the fight off after the second one, even though Bowe seemed able to continue. Pacheco disagreed with the stoppage, calling it "very strange", but Marv Albert said Bowe took "a pounding."
