= Boxing at the 1992 Summer Olympics – Super heavyweight =

Boxing at the Olympics

Super heavyweight boxing at the Games of the XXV Olympiad
- Venue: Pavelló Club Joventut Badalona
- Dates: 27 July – 9 August 1992
- Competitors: 17 from 17 nations

Medalists
1st place, gold medalist(s)		Roberto Balado	Cuba
2nd place, silver medalist(s)		Richard Igbineghu	Nigeria
3rd place, bronze medalist(s)		Svilen Rusinov	Bulgaria
3rd place, bronze medalist(s)		Brian Nielsen	Denmark

The men's super heavyweight event was part of the boxing programme at the 1992 Summer Olympics. The weight class allowed boxers of more than 91 kilograms to compete. The competition was held from 27 July to 9 August 1992. 17 boxers from 17 nations competed.

== Medalists ==
Gold	Roberto Balado; Cuba
Silver	Richard Igbineghu; Nigeria
Bronze	Svilen Rusinov; Bulgaria
Bronze	Brian Nielsen; Denmark

== Results ==
The following boxers took part in the event:

Rank	Name	Country
1	Roberto Balado	Cuba
2	Richard Igbineghu	Nigeria
3T	Svilen Rusinov	Bulgaria
3T	Brian Nielsen	Denmark
5T	Peter Hrivňák	Czechoslovakia
5T	Larry Donald	United States
5T	Gytis Juškevičius	Lithuania
5T	Willi Fischer	Germany
9T	Kevin McBride	Ireland
9T	Jeong Seung-won	South Korea
9T	Tom Glesby	Canada
9T	Nikolay Kulpin	Unified Team
9T	David Anyim	Kenya
9T	István Szikora	Hungary
9T	Jerry Nijman	Netherlands
16T	Ahmed Sarir	Morocco
16T	Iraj Kia Rostami	Iran

=== First round ===
- Peter Hrivňák (TCH) – BYE
- Kevin McBride (IRL) – BYE
- Brian Nielsen (DEN) – BYE
- Jeong Seung-won (KOR) – BYE
- Roberto Balado (CUB) – BYE
- Tom Glesby (CAN) – BYE
- Larry Donald (USA) – BYE
- Nikolay Kulpin (EUN) – BYE
- Gytis Juškevičius (LTU) – BYE
- David Anyim (KEN) – BYE
- Svilen Rusinov (BUL) – BYE
- István Szikora (HUN) – BYE
- Wilhelm Fischer (GER) def. Ahmed Sarir (MAR), RSC-2 (00:56)
- Jerry Nijman (NED) def. Iraj Kia Rostami (IRN), 9:5

=== Second round ===
- Peter Hrivňák (TCH) def. Kevin McBride (IRL), 21:1
- Brian Nielsen (DEN) def. Jeong Seung-won (KOR), 16:2
- Roberto Balado (CUB) def. Tom Glesby (CAN), 16:2
- Larry Donald (USA) def. Nikolay Kulpin (EUN), RSCI-3 (00:02)
- Richard Igbineghu (NGA) def. Liade Alhassan (GHA), walk-over
- Gytis Juškevičius (LTU) def. David Anyim (KEN), RSCI-2 (01:38)
- Svilen Rusinov (BUL) def. István Szikora (HUN), 12:4
- Wilhelm Fischer (GER) def. Jerry Nijman (NED), 22:5

=== Quarterfinals ===
- Brian Nielsen (DEN) def. Peter Hrivňák (TCH), 14:4
- Roberto Balado (CUB) def. Larry Donald (USA), 10:4
- Richard Igbineghu (NGR) def. Gytis Juškevičius (LTU), KO-2 (01:27)
- Svilen Rusinov (BUL) def. Wilhelm Fischer (GER), 8:5

=== Semifinals ===
- Roberto Balado (CUB) def. Brian Nielsen (DEN), 15:1
- Richard Igbineghu (NGR) def. Svilen Rusinov (BUL), 9:7

=== Final ===
- Roberto Balado (CUB) def. Richard Igbineghu (NGR), 13:2
