= Rusinov =

Rusinov (Russian: Русинов) is a Russian masculine surname, its feminine counterpart is Rusinova. It may refer to

- Dmytro Rusinov (born 1990), Ukrainian biathlete
- Mikhail Rusinov (1909–2004), Russian optical scientist
- Roman Rusinov (born 1981), Russian auto racing driver
- Svilen Rusinov (born 1964), Bulgarian boxer

== See also ==
- Rušinov, a village and municipality in the Czech Republic
