= Nikolay Kulpin =

Kazakhstani boxer (1968–2003)

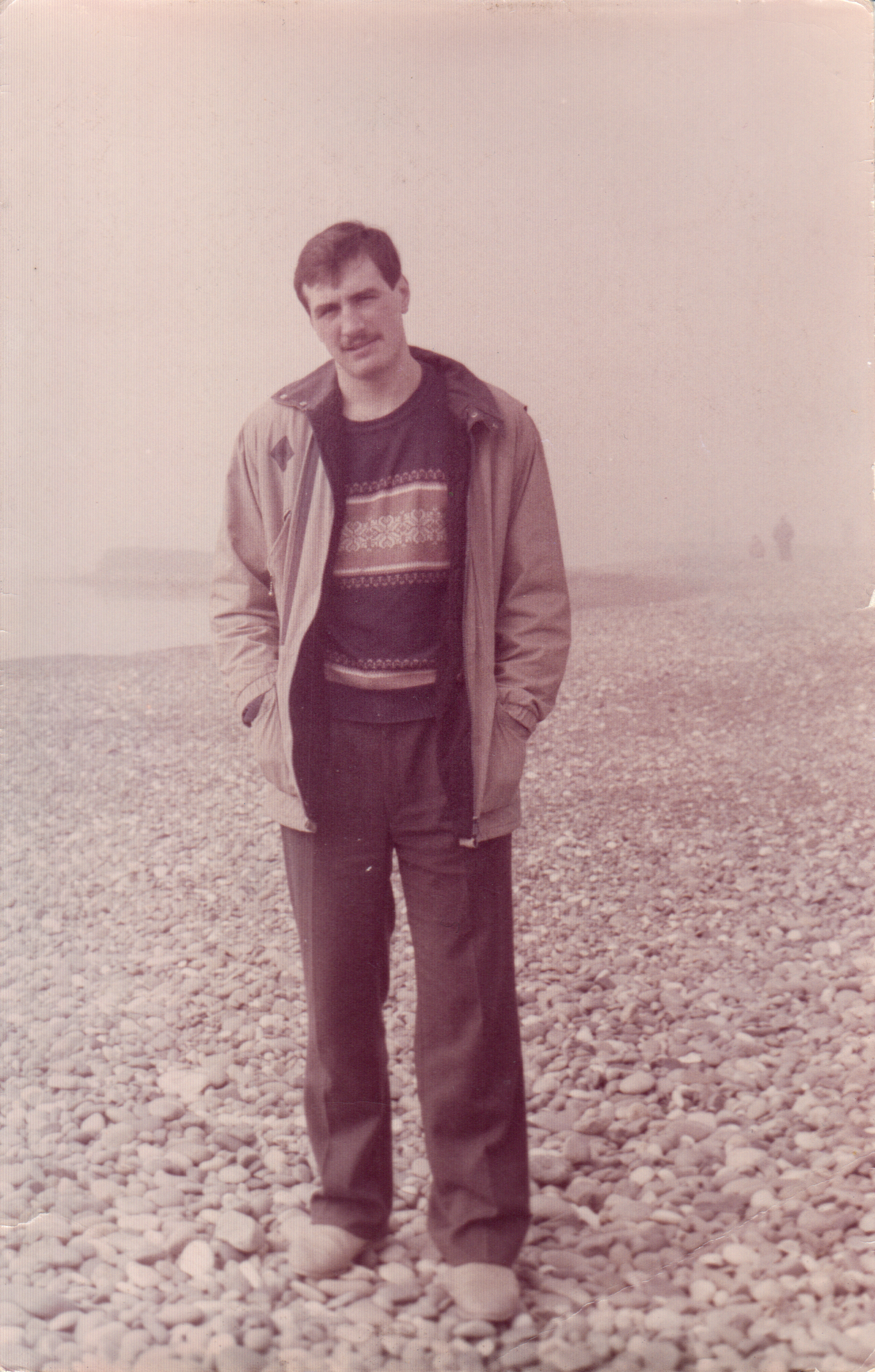
- Photo taken circa the mid-1990s

Personal information
- Nationality: Soviet Russian; Kazakhstani
- Born: 12 December 1968; Oryol, Russian SFSR, Soviet Union
- Died: 12 March 2003 (aged 34); Pavlodar, Kazakhstan
- Height: 187 cm (6 ft 2 in)
- Weight: Heavyweight

Sport
- Sport: Boxing

Nikolay Anatoliyevich Kulpin (12 December 1968 – 12 March 2003) was a Kazakhstani boxer. He competed in the men's super heavyweight event at the 1992 Summer Olympics representing the Unified Team.

== Amateur career ==
(bronze) TSC Tournament (+91 kg), Berlin, East Germany, July 1988:

- 1/2: Lost to Jorge Luis González (Cuba) by unanimous decision, 0–5

(gold) Canada Cup (+91 kg), Civic Centre, Ottawa, Canada, June 1991:

- 1/4: Defeated Vernon Linklater (Canada) KO 1 (1:06)
- 1/2: Defeated Paul Douglas (Ireland) KO 1 (1:37)
- Finals: Defeated Andrey Aulov (RSFSR) RSCO 3 (2:58; at the time the bout was stopped, Kulpin was leading on points, 14–2)

(gold) X Summer Spartakiad of Peoples of the USSR, boxing (+91 kg), Minsk, Belarus SSR, July 1991:

- 1/2: Defeated Mikhail Yurchenko (Kazakh SSR)
- Finals: Defeated Oleg Maskaev (Uzbek SSR)

USA−USSR Middle & Heavy Duals (+91 kg), Camp Lejeune, North Carolina, December 1991:

- Defeated Archie Perry (United States) RSC 1 (2:30)

(silver) CIS Boxing Championships (+91 kg), Tambov, Russia, February 1992:

- 1/2: Defeated Andrey Aulov (Russia)
- Finals: Lost to Mikhail Yurchenko (Kazakhstan)

(gold) King's Cup (+91 kg), Bangkok, Thailand, April 1992:

- Finals: Defeated Jung-hyun An (South Korea) RSC

(gold) Seoul Cup (+91 kg), Seoul, South Korea, May 1992:

- 1/2: Defeated Ahmed Sarir (Morocco) RSC 1
- Finals: Defeated Jeong Seung-won (South Korea)

Olympic Games (+91 kg), Barcelona, Spain, July 1992:

- 1/8: Lost to Larry Donald (United States) RSCI 3 (0:02)

World Championships (+91 kg), Tampere, Finland, May 1993:

- 1/8: Defeated Piotr Jurczyk (Poland) on points, 16–4
- 1/4: Lost to Yevgeniy Belousov (Russia) on points, 8–10

After two professional fights in 1992 Kulpin resumed his amateur career to compete in the 1993 World Championships, where he was dropped out from the quarterfinals.

== Professional boxing record ==
20 fights	15 wins	5 losses
By knockout	12	0
By decision	3	5

No.	Result	Record	Opp Record	Opponent	Type	Round, time	Date	Location	Notes
	Canc.	15–5	20–1	(United States) Buster Mathis Jr.	NR	0 (10)	27 Feb 1996	Morula Sun Casino, Mabopane, South Africa	Substituted by Ken Smith
20	Win	15–5	12–2–0	(United Kingdom) Julius Francis	PTS	10	30 Nov 1995	Circus, Saratov, Russia	
19	Loss	14–5	5–0–0	(Uzbekistan) Oleg Maskaev	UD	12	29 Sep 1995	(United Kingdom) York Hall, Bethnal Green, London, England	For vacant PABA Heavyweight Title
18	Win	14–4	11–0–0	(Cuba) Aurelio Perez	TKO	3	25 Jul 1995	São Paulo, Brazil	
17	Loss	13–4	9–0–0	(Cuba) Aurelio Perez	MD	10	3 May 1995	Carapicuíba, Brazil	
16	Win	13–3	10–4–0	(Russia) Alexey Varakin	KO	1	7 Apr 1995	Rossiya Hotel, Moscow, Russia	For vacant Russia Heavyweight Title
15	Loss	12–3	25–1–0	(South Africa) Corrie Sanders	UD	10	1 Apr 1995	Superbowl, Sun City, South Africa	
14	Win	12–2	debut	(Armenia) David Gharibyan	PTS	8	24 Feb 1995	Moscow, Russia	
13	Loss	11–2	56–4–0	(Brazil) Adilson Rodrigues	UD	10	11 Dec 1994	Embu-Guaçu, Brazil	
12	Win	11–1	7–19–1	(United States) Mike Robinson	KO	4	30 Nov 1994	Circus, Saratov, Russia	
11	Loss	10–1	24–10–1	(United Kingdom) Johnny Nelson	SD	12	5 Nov 1994	Provincial Stadium, Chiang Rai, Thailand	For World Boxing Federation World Heavyweight Title
10	Win	10–0	3–0–0	(Russia) Vladimir Yelbaev	TKO	3 (8)	21 Jun 1994	Moscow, Russia	For Russia Heavyweight Title
9	Win	9–0	debut	(Russia) Anatoly Veryovkin	TKO	4 (8)	27 May 1994	Sports Palace, Tolyatti, Russia	
8	Win	8–0	0–1–0	(Bulgaria) Tzvetan Tzvetkov	TKO		7 May 1994	Sportpalace Meteor, Dnipropetrovsk, Ukraine	
7	Win	7–0	0–1–0	(Russia) Anatoly Danilov	PTS	8	18 Mar 1994	Krasnoyarsk, Russia	
6	Win	6–0	0–1–0	(Russia) Vitaly Yarovoy	TKO	4 (8)	30 Nov 1993	Kristall Ice Palace, Saratov, Russia	
5	Win	5–0	8–1–1	(Uruguay) Gilton dos Santos	KO	6	15 Oct 1993	Montevideo, Uruguay	
4	Win	4–0	debut	(Russia) Nikolay Soshilin	KO	4 (8)	13 Sep 1993	Moscow, Russia	
3	Win	3–0	debut	(Russia) Georgiy Peskov	TKO	3 (8)	28 Aug 1993	Shakhty, Russia	
Was reinstated as an amateur boxer by AIBA, and resumed his amateur career
2	Win	2–0	debut	(Kazakhstan) Viktor Shtorm	KO	3 (8)	23 Sep 1992	Kostanay, Kazakhstan	
1	Win	1–0	1–1–0	(Kazakhstan) Viktor Aldoshin	TKO	4 (8)	10 Aug 1992	Pavlodar, Kazakhstan	

Sporting positions
National boxing titles
Preceded by Vladimir Yelbaev	Russia's Heavyweight Champion; June 21, 1994 – July 16, 1994; Stripped of	Succeeded by Alexey Varakin

Preceded by Georgiy Peskov	Russia's Heavyweight Champion; April 7, 1995 – 1996; Retired	Succeeded by Nikolay Valuev
