= Richard Igbineghu =

Nigerian boxer (born 1968)

Personal information
- Full name: Richard Igbineghu-Bango
- Nationality: Nigeria
- Born: 21 April 1968 (age 58) Ibadan, Oyo State
- Height: 1.93 m (6 ft 4 in)
- Weight: 91 kg (201 lb)

Sport
- Sport: Boxing
- Weight class: Super Heavyweight
Medal record
Olympic Games
Silver medal – second place	1992 Barcelona	Super Heavyweight
All-Africa Games
Gold medal – first place	1991 Cairo	Super Heavyweight

Richard Igbineghu-Bango (born 21 April 1968) is a Nigerian boxer. At the 1992 Summer Olympics he won the silver medal in the men's super heavyweight (+ 91 kg) category.

== Olympic results ==
- Defeated Gytis Juškevičius (Lithuania), KO 2
- Defeated Svilen Rusinov (Bulgaria), 9–7
- Lost to Roberto Balado (Cuba), 2–13

== Professional career ==
Fighting under the name Richard Bango, Igbineghu turned pro in 1994 with moderate success. Although he began his career 16–0, Bango took three years off, from 1996 to 1999. At the advanced age of 36, Bango took on his first real challenge, goliath Nikolay Valuev. Bango was TKO'd in the 6th round. In 2006, Bango dropped his second loss, to a young Alexander Povetkin, via a 2nd-round KO.

== Professional boxing record ==
17 Wins (13 knockouts, 4 decisions), 2 Losses (2 knockouts, 0 decisions)
Result	Record	Opponent	Type	Round	Date	Location	Notes
Loss	5–0	(Russia) Alexander Povetkin	KO	2	04/03/2006	Oldenburg, Niedersachsen, Germany	Bango knocked out at 2:20 of the second round.
Win	4–7–1	(Romania) Marian Tudor	TKO	2	20/05/2005	Tres Cantos, Comunidad de Madrid, Spain	
Loss	36–0	(Russia) Nikolay "Russian Giant" Valuev	TKO	6	24/07/2004	Frankfurt, Brandenburg, Germany	WBA Intercontinental Heavyweight Title. Referee stopped the bout at 1:50 of the sixth round.
Win	1–1	(Portugal) Gerson Domingos	PTS	6	16/04/2004	Leganés, Comunidad de Madrid, Spain	
Win	17–13	(Colombia) Armando Grueso	TKO	8	21/06/2003	Albufeira, Portugal	
Win	18–1	(Nigeria) Adewale "Tiger" Abbey	KO	6	29/03/2003	Ibadan, Nigeria	Nigeria Heavyweight Title.
Win	15–55–1	(United States) Roy Bedwell	TKO	1	24/06/2000	Covington, Tennessee, United States	
Win	14–101–5	(United States) Frankie Hines	KO	2	20/04/2000	Virginia, United States	
Win	7–10	(United States) Rodney McSwain	UD	6	15/04/2000	Bayboro, North Carolina, United States	
Win	7–2	(United States) Marcus Johnson	UD	6	20/07/1999	Windsor, Ontario, Canada	
Win	2–34	(United States) George Harris	KO	2	26/06/1999	Gallatin, Tennessee, United States	
Win	--	Willard Lockhart	KO	1	17/07/1996	(New York (state)) New York City, United States	
Win	3–2	(United States) Mark Johnson	TKO	2	19/06/1996	Newark, New Jersey, United States	
Win	3–3	(United States) Jihad Abdulaziz	TKO	3	27/04/1996	(New York (state)) New York City, United States	
Win	0–3	(United States) Roy "Chicken" Little	KO	1	21/11/1995	Auburn Hills, Michigan, United States	Little knocked out at 0:50 of the first round.
Win	7–7–2	(United Kingdom) Dennis "The Menace" Bailey	TKO	1	17/02/1995	Cumbernauld, Scotland, United Kingdom	
Win	3–0	(United States) Archie Perry	PTS	4	05/11/1994	Las Vegas, Nevada, United States	
Win	2–5–1	(United Kingdom) John Pierre	TKO	3	25/10/1994	Middlesbrough, Yorkshire, United Kingdom	
Win	19–20–1	(United Kingdom) Steve Garber	KO	1	30/07/1994	Bethnal Green, London, United Kingdom	
