= Tshibalabala Kadima =

Zairean boxer (born 1962)

Personal information
- Born: 18 January 1962 (age 64)
Medal record
Men's Boxing
Representing Zaire
All-Africa Games
Silver medal – second place	1987 Nairobi	Super-heavyweight

Tshibalabala Kadima (born 18 January 1962) is a boxer from Zaire, who competed in the super-heavyweight (+ 91 kg) division at the 1988 Summer Olympics. Kadima lost his opening bout to Andreas Schnieders of West Germany. Kadima won the silver medal in the super-heavyweight division at the 1987 All-Africa Games, losing to Chris Odera of Kenya in the final.

== 1988 Olympic results ==
Below is the record of Tshibalabala Kadima, a super heavyweight boxer from Zaire who competed at the 1988 Seoul Olympics:

- Round of 32: lost to Andreas Schnieders (West Germany) referee stopped contest in the second round
