= Jeong Seung-won =

Jeong Seung-won (정승원) may refer to:

- Jung Seung-won (curler) (born 1958), South Korean wheelchair curler
- Jeong Seung-won (boxer) (born 1970), South Korean boxer
- Jeong Seung-won (footballer) (born 1997), South Korean footballer
