= Ovwigbo Uba =

Nigerian boxer

Personal information
- Nationality: Nigerian
- Born: 21 January 1962 (age 63)

Sport
- Sport: Boxing

Ovwigbo Uba (born 21 January 1962) is a Nigerian boxer. He competed in the men's super heavyweight event at the 1988 Summer Olympics. At the 1988 Summer Olympics, he lost to Andreas Schnieders of West Germany.
