= Alfredo Rego =

Alfredo Rego may refer to:

- Alfredo Rego (skier)
- Alfredo Rego (general)
