= Cuban Boxing Federation =

- Abbreviation: CBF
- Formation: 1921; 105 years ago
- Purpose: Boxing sanctioning organization
- Headquarters: Havana, Cuba
- Region served: Cuba
- Founder: Rosendo Collazo
- President: Alberto Puig de la Barca

The Cuban Boxing Federation (FCB) was established in 1921 in Havana, Cuba.

The creation of the National Boxing Commission of Cuba was headed by former Cuban senator and colonel Rosendo Collazo. Collazo was the commission's first president and chairman. Alberto Puig de la Barca is the current Cuban Boxing Federation president.

== Early history ==
The Cuban government formed a national commission to monitor boxing and regulate the sport in 1921, following a prior prohibition due to growing violence in the country.

In 1962, following the Cuban Revolution of the 1950s, the new leader Fidel Castro banned professional boxing. Cuban fighters were limited to the amateur boxing system, which allowed them to compete in the Olympics but excluded them from the lucrative professional fight circuit. In 2007, the International Amateur Boxing Association came under fire from the Cuban Boxing Federation, which claimed that professional boxing promoters who attend amateur boxing competitions are enticing fighters to defect.

The International Boxing Association (AIBA) and the Cuban Boxing Federation (FCB) signed a memorandum in 2015 stipulating that all FCB boxers will only participate in AIBA-approved contests, such as the World Series of Boxing (WSB) and AIBA Pro Boxing (APB).

In 1968, the federation began holding the Giraldo Cordova Cardin International Boxing Tournament in Havana, Cuba.

The Cuban Boxing Federation employed three doctors, a masseuse, and a sports psychologist year-round by 1987. During the early 2000s, the Cuban Boxing Federation appointed renowned Cuban fighter Teofilo Stevenson as its vice president.

=== 2022-present ===
Cuba ended its long-standing ban on professional boxing in April 2022, allowing fighters from that country to compete in professional bouts for the first time since the 1962 ban. The Cuban Boxing Federation signed a contract with Mexico's Golden Ring Promotions company, for the representation of Cuba in its entry into professional boxing. As per the agreement, the boxers would receive 80% of the revenue, with the remaining 20% being divided among the federation, trainers, and medics.

Ahead of the 2024 Summer Olympics, the Cuban Boxing Federation declared in December 2022 that it would be lifting its prohibition on women's boxing and forming a national women's team.
