= Mohamed Hammad =

Sudanese boxer (born 1963)

Personal information
- Nationality: Sudanese
- Born: 11 July 1963 (age 62) Babanusah, Sudan

Sport
- Sport: Boxing

Mohamed Hammad (born 11 July 1963) is a Sudanese boxer. He competed in the men's super heavyweight event at the 1988 Summer Olympics.
