= Rosendo Collazo =

Cuban politician and army colonel

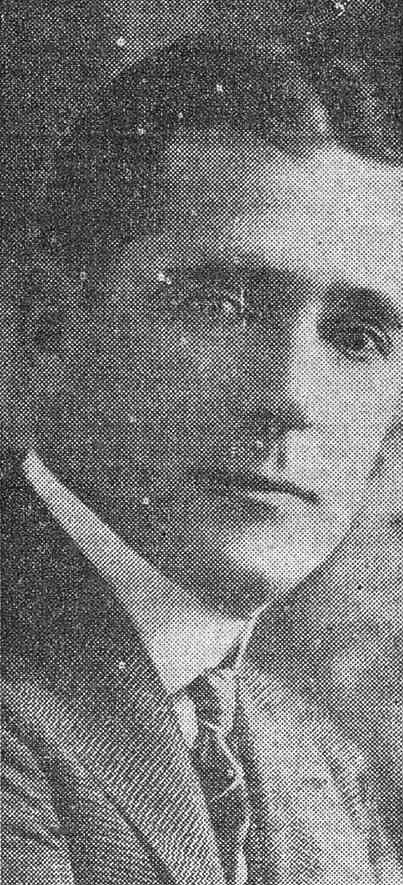

Cuban Senator
- Constituency: Havana Province

Personal details
- Born: Rosendo Collazo y Garcia; March 1, 1875 Mangas, Pinar del Rio, Captaincy General of Cuba, Spanish Empire
- Died: Unknown
- Children: Aurelio Collazo
- Nickname: Hero of Caicaje

Military service
- Allegiance: Republic of Cuba
- Branch/service: Cuban Liberation Army
- Rank: Colonel
- Battles/wars: Cuban War of Independence; Battle of Cantabria; Battle of Caicaje; War of 1912

Rosendo Collazo was a Cuban senator, army colonel, and veteran of the Cuban War of Independence.

== Biography ==
Rosendo Collazo y Garcia was born on March 1, 1875, in Las Mangas, Pinar del Río Province, Cuba.

He joined the Cuban Liberation Army in the 1890s and fought during the third Cuban War of Independence. He distinguished himself as an aide to General Antonio Maceo against the Spaniards in Havana. On December 8, 1897, he signed a proclamation with other Cuban military officers and civil leaders in Havana protesting against Spain's sovereignty over Cuba. By 1898, Collazo was in the Cuban Army with the rank of colonel. On Feb 2, 1898, a detachment of Spanish Cavalry engaged with an insurgent force under Collazo, at the Aguayo Plantation in Havana Province. 4 insurgents were captured by the Spaniards who also wounded seven men.

In 1906, rebels in Havana were defeated by a force of the Cuban Rural Guard and other volunteers commanded by General Alfredo Rego and Collazo in the Tapaste Hills. After two hours of firing, the government troops made a machete charge. One of the Cuban army officers was killed in the altercation, while Collazo and another corporal were wounded.

During the War of 1912, a detachment of troops under the Cuban Army Major defeated 10 insurgents in a battle near El Cobre.

Following the 1916 Cuban general election, liberals contested conservative Cuban president Mario García Menocal's re-election, sparking a military insurgency. Liberal insurgent forces including Gerardo Machado were defeated at the Battle of Caicaje. In March 1917, Collazo and another colonel commanded the government forces that captured former Cuban President Jose Miguel Gomez and almost his entire command in Placetas.

Collazo was regarded as a tactical expert and a student of military affairs. The Cuban army officers referred to him as the "hero of Caicaje," a title that he earned after capturing Jose Miguel Gomez. In August 1917, he toured the United States to learn the workings of the U.S. Army's selective draft by President Mario García Menocal's order. At the commemoration of Cuba's sixteenth anniversary of independence in May 1918, he rode at the head of the troops.

Collazo became a member of the Cuban Senate and a member of its Foreign Relations Committee.

In 1921, Senator Rosendo Collazo led the establishment of Cuba's National Boxing Commission to regulate the sport. Collazo was the first president and chairman of the Cuban Boxing Federation.

On August 19, 1922, Collazo, an expert swordsman, and Colonel Orestes Ferrara, a representative for Havana province settled a point of honor with a duel. The duel was initiated due to news stories published in Ferrara's Havana paper, El Heraldo de Cuba, about Collazo's two nephews being killed in a street brawl in Marianao. Collazo sustained a right shoulder wound, while Ferrara's nose was slashed and drew blood before the congressmen shook hands. On August 17, a similar dispute occurred with La Liberdad's director, Sergio Carbó, who was wounded by Collazo.

Rosendo Collazo aspired to succeed Gerardo Machado who was elected as Cuba's fifth president on May 20, 1925.

In October 1930, Collazo departed from Cuba to New York before being implicated in an alleged plot to assassinate fellow senate members that was uncovered by Havana newspaper El Pais Today. He was also accused of fomenting revolution and investigated for organizing a plot to seize arms and munitions at the Fortress La Cabaña for a revolutionary movement. Collazo, who was visiting New York on October 15, expressed his astonishment at the Havana reports that were published. After departing from Cuba to New York, Collazo maintained a headquarters at the Hotel Biltmore.

On August 5, 1931, five Cubans and one American were detained by American Department of Justice agents pending an investigation of a tip that they were plotting a revolution in Cuba and attempting to board a gun-running vessel, off of New York Harbor. Collazo and the others being held were questioned by Federal authorities to determine whether they had broken any laws against revolutionary activity in a friendly country, despite their claim that they were out fishing. Once questioned, they were later freed. 1931 Havana reports said that the retired Army colonel Collazo had organized and led a group of rebel sympathizers from the U.S. in Santa Clara. Still, Collazo denied the reports at the Associated Press New York office on August 15, 1931. Collazo and two other defendants were later arraigned on November 7, 1931, charged with having "prepared to furnish money for and to take part in a military expedition to be carried on from the United States against the republic of Cuba, a nation which the United States is at peace". Collazo was held on a $10,000 bond. In December 1931, a federal grand jury considered charges against a total of eight men who were charged with planning a military expedition against Cuba while they were in the States including Rosendo and his son Aurelio Collazo, as well as Aurelio Alvarez.

Collazo was detained in Morón, Cuba in September 1933 and charged with conspiracy to rebel. He was subsequently imprisoned at La Cabaña. Collazo later participated in a revolt with ABC members against the One Hundred Days Government headed by Ramón Grau and Fulgencio Batista, in November 1933. After retreating to Atarés Castle as a rebel stronghold, Rosendo Collazo along with Blas Hernandez and Circo Leonard were later forced to surrender on November 9.
