= Svilen Rusinov =

Bulgarian boxer (born 1964)

Personal information
- Full name: Свилен Алдинов Русинов
- Nationality: Bulgaria
- Born: 29 February 1964 (age 62) Gradezhnitsa
- Height: 1.90 m (6 ft 3 in)
- Weight: 91 kg (201 lb)

Sport
- Sport: Boxing
- Weight class: Super Heavyweight
- Club: Central Sport Klub Army
Medal record
Olympic Games
Bronze medal – third place	1992 Barcelona	Super Heavyweight
World Amateur Championships
Silver medal – second place	1991 Sydney	Super Heavyweight
Silver medal – second place	1993 Tampere	Super Heavyweight
Bronze medal – third place	1986 Reno	Heavyweight
European Amateur Championships
Gold medal – first place	1993 Bursa	Super Heavyweight
Bronze medal – third place	1987 Turin	Heavyweight
Bronze medal – third place	1989 Athens	Super Heavyweight
Bronze medal – third place	1991 Gothenburg	Super Heavyweight

Svilen Aldinov Rusinov (Bulgarian: Свилен Алдинов Русинов; born 29 February 1964 in Teteven) is a Bulgarian boxer, who twice competed at the Summer Olympics for his native country. As an amateur he won a bronze medal in the super heavyweight division (+ 91 kg) at the Barcelona Olympics in 1992. He also won the European Championship in 1993 and was twice runner up in the World Amateur Championships.

During his extensive amateur career Rusinov consistently competed at the highest level and boxed a number of amateur and future professional boxing greats. He holds wins over Vitali Klitschko and 3 times Olympic champion Felix Savon, as well as a close loss to Wladimir Klitschko. In an interview he stated that his toughest opponent was Roberto Balado, the 1992 Olympic champion from Cuba .

== Olympic results ==
1988

- 1st round bye
- Lost to Andrew Golota (Poland) 0–5

1992

- 1st round bye
- Defeated István Szikora (Hungary) 12–4
- Defeated Willi Fischer (Germany) 8–5
- Lost to Richard Igbineghu (Nigeria) 7–9

== Post amateur career ==
Rusinov turned pro in 1999 and fought only one fight, which he won, before retiring. He has stated that in the post-communist years he did not have the opportunity to turn professional. He briefly became a boxing coach at the CSKA club, working amongst others with future professional world title challenger Kubrat Pulev.

Rusinov subsequently became a farmer and mayor of his native village of Gradezhnitsa.
