= Francisco de Pando y Armand =

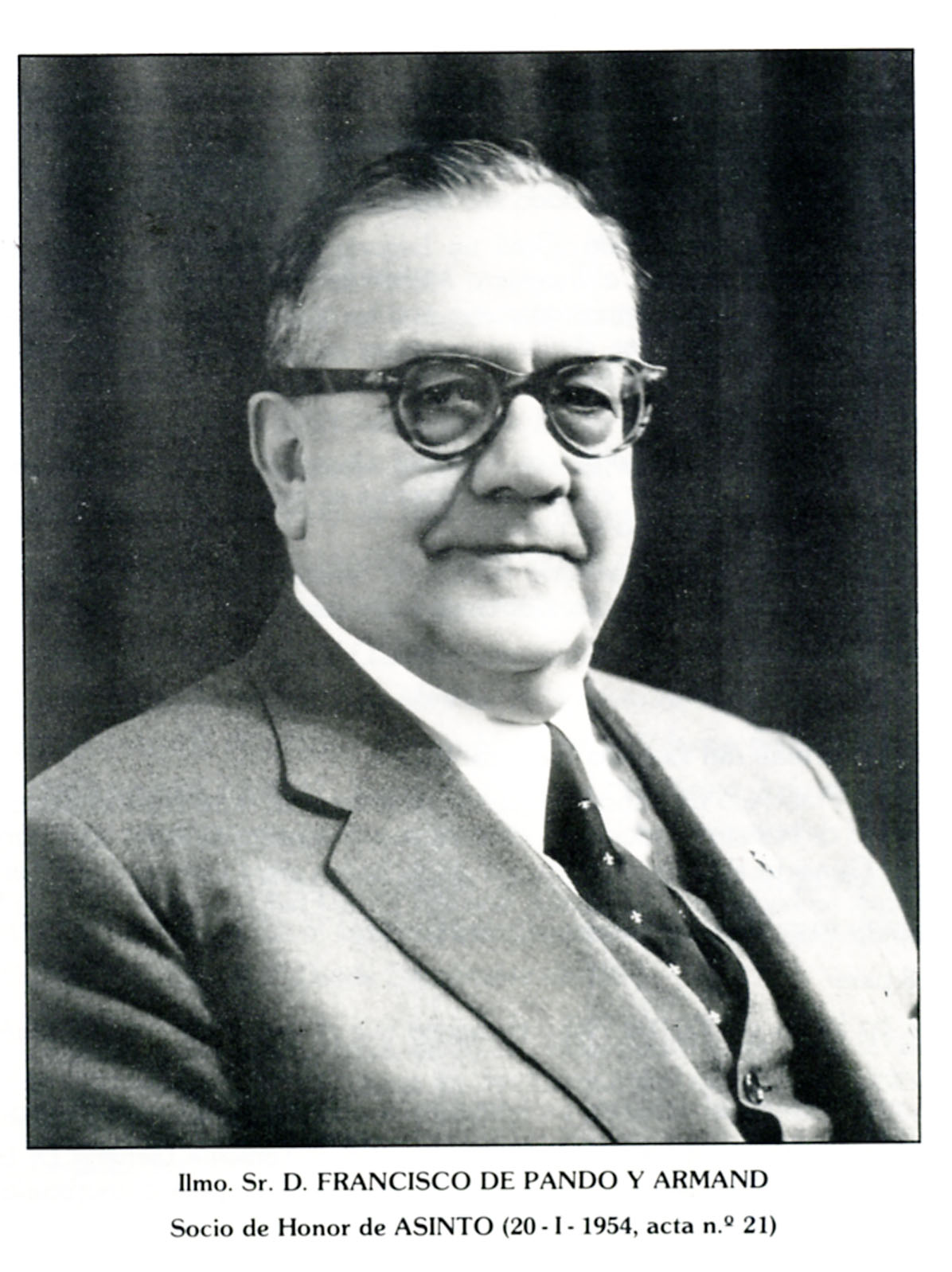
- Francisco de Pando y Armand
- Born: Francisco de Pando y Armand; 1900; Cuba
- Died: 1977 (aged 76–77); Spain
- Occupation: Cuban Sugar Estate Owner
- Spouse: Emma Ramsden y de la Torre
- Children: Luis Manuel de Pando y Ramsden

Francisco de Pando y Armand (1900-1977) was a sugar estate owner in Cuba known for his influential leadership in the Cuban sugar industry. He was owner of four sugar producing estates, with land holdings in excess of 24,000 acres. de Pando engaged in corporate and political activities and held interests in various railways and banks.

== Biography ==
de Pando was a Cuban and the only son of Lieutenant-General Luis Manuel de Pando y Sánchez and Cecilia Armand-Roche.

== Professional career ==
As president and principal owner of the sugar estates Central Romelié S.A., and Santa Cecilia S.A. each consisting of approximately 12,000 acres with a daily production capacity of 150,000 bags and 2,600 employees, de Pando was the 97th-ranked landowner in Cuba.

de Pando served as director and one of the majority shareholders of the Cuban corporation "Compañia Cubana", owner of 2 sugar estates, which represented the 15th and 7th most important with respect to capitalization.

In 1958, he was Vice-President of the General Board of Members of ICEA (Institute of Economic Sciences and Autonomous-Management), and Vice-President I of the ANHC (National Association of Cuban Sugar Mill Owners), where he presided on 2 occasions during the 1940s, and in 1951-1956. Consulting Counselor, 1952-1955.

de Pando was declared by the Castro government as the most influential leader in the Cuban sugar industry.

== History ==
In 1917, the maternal side of his family, the Armand-Roches, became co-owners of the Romelié sugar estate, along with the Brooks family heirs. The Brooks family was English, and owners of several sugar estates in the Guantánamo region, along with the McKinleys. They were partners from 1905 until the mid-1920s when the de Pando family became the sole owners of Romelie.

In the 1940s, de Pando entered into an agreement with Julio Lobo Olavarría and with Dr. Delio Nuñez Mesa, for the purchase of more sugar interests.

Later, in March 1944, de Pando and Julio Lobo participated in the purchase of the “Tinguaro” sugar estate for $1,650,000 ($29.5 million in 2024 dollars) along with Rafael Águila Sarduy and others. De Pando was an advisor and minority shareholder of the "Banco Atlántico" from its founding in 1951 until its sale in April 1954 to “The Trust Company of Cuba.” In 1953, de Pando was a member of the board of directors of “The Cuba Company.”

== Philanthropy ==
In 1956, he established with a generous donation, the General Pando Legacy. This foundation in honor of his father, General Luis Manuel de Pando, was intended to honor Spanish military survivors and the museum of engineers. It was to be managed by the association of engineers.

== Personal life ==
De Pando married Emma Ramsden y de la Torre, daughter of Frederick Wollaston Ramsden, former British Consul General and Susana de la Torre. Their only son, Luis Manuel de Pando y Ramsden later married María Victoria Quiroga and had four children. Luis Manuel was a Vice-President of the sugar estates.

On September 21, 1961, de Pando and his family were forced into exile when the Castro government announced the expropriation of all the family property and holdings. They settled in Key Biscayne, Florida. De Pando divided his time between there and Madrid until his death in Madrid in 1977.

== See also ==
- Cuban sugar economy
- Sugarcane
- Luis Manuel de Pando y Sánchez
