= Alfredo Rego (general) =

Cuban general

- Born: Alfredo Rego; Cienfuegos, Captaincy General of Cuba, Spanish Empire
- Military career
- Allegiance: Republic of Cuba
- Branch: Cuban Army
- Rank: General
- Conflicts: Cuban War of Independence; Battle of Cantabria

Alfredo Rego was a Cuban general and veteran of the Cuban War of Independence.

== Biography ==
Alfredo Rego was born in the Cienfuegos Province of Cuba.

In August 1895, he helped organize a local rebel force, the Brigade of Cienfuegos, in which José González Planas led the infantry and Rego led the cavalry. The Cienfuegos Brigade had roughly 400 new soldiers incorporated in the Santa Clara Province by September. Serving as the brigadier general of the Cienfuegos brigade, Rego engaged a force of 1500 Spaniards in combat in November 1895 with 800 fully armed cavalrymen. It was fought on the sugar plantation of Cantabria in Cienfuegos and was known as the Battle of Cantabria. Twenty-eight weapons, a high quantity of ammunition, and sixteen Spaniards—two of them severely wounded—were captured by Rego's forces. After tending to the soldiers' wounds, he handed both over to a party dispatched by the Spanish commander. Soon after, General Luis Manuel de Pando y Sánchez wrote to Rego, offering him $60,000 and the rank of brigadier general in the Spanish army in exchange for abandoning the Cuban cause.

Rego was regarded as the best horseman in the Cuban army and had been promoted to general despite being severely wounded several times.

A Cuban hospital was defended against Spanish forces, the Saboya battalion, in July 1897 by forces under General Alfredo Rego. 2,000 people engaged in combat on both sides, resulting in 44 Spanish deaths and 60 injuries, as well as 24 Cuban deaths and 50 injuries. Following the battle, Rego treated the wounded Spaniards in the hospital they intended to raid.

General Alfredo Rego and Captain Rosendo Collazo led a combined force of 130 rural guards and volunteers in 1906 against 400 rebels in Havana.
