= Janusz Zarenkiewicz =

Polish boxer

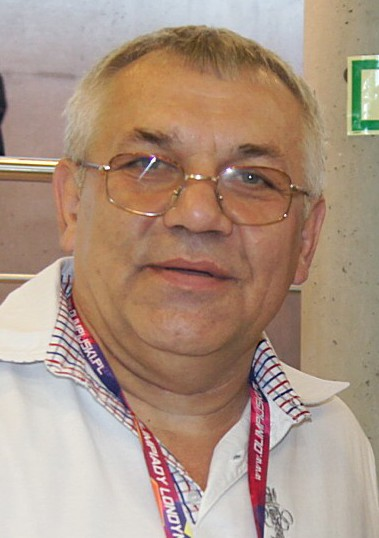
- Zarenkiewicz in 2012

Personal information
- Nationality: Polish
- Born: 3 August 1959 (age 66) Nowy Las, Opole Voivodeship, Poland
- Height: 1.88 m (6 ft 2 in)
- Weight: Super-heavyweight

Boxing career
- Stance: Orthodox
Medal record
Men's amateur boxing
Representing Poland
European Championships
Bronze medal – third place	1985 Budapest	Super-heavyweight
Olympic Games
Bronze medal – third place	1988 Seoul	Super-heavyweight

Janusz Zarenkiewicz (born August 3, 1959) is a Polish former amateur boxer. He won a bronze medal in the super-heavyweight division at the 1988 Summer Olympics, where he forfeited his semi-final fight to eventual gold medalist Lennox Lewis. Zarenkiewicz also won bronze at the 1985 European Championships and was a five-time Polish national champion.

== Olympic results ==
- First-round bye
- Defeated Harold Arroyo (Puerto Rico), 5–0
- Defeated Andreas Schnieders (West Germany), 3–2
- Lost to Lennox Lewis (Canada), walkover
