= Ahmed Sarir =

Moroccan boxer

Personal information
- Nationality: Moroccan
- Born: 25 December 1962 (age 62)

Sport
- Sport: Boxing

Ahmed Sarir (born 25 December 1962) is a Moroccan boxer. He competed in the men's super heavyweight event at the 1992 Summer Olympics.
