= Ali Al-Baluchi =

Kuwaiti boxer

Personal information
- Nationality: Kuwaiti
- Born: 6 April 1959
- Died: 17 April 2023 (aged 64)

Sport
- Sport: Boxing

Ali Al-Baluchi (6 April 1959 – 17 April 2023) was a Kuwaiti boxer. He competed in the men's super heavyweight event at the 1988 Summer Olympics. He was a national champion. He also won the gold medal in his event at the 1987 Asian Amateur Boxing Championships against Dildar Ahmed of Pakistan, fulfilling a promise he had made that he would win the competition.
