= Rušinov =

- Municipality
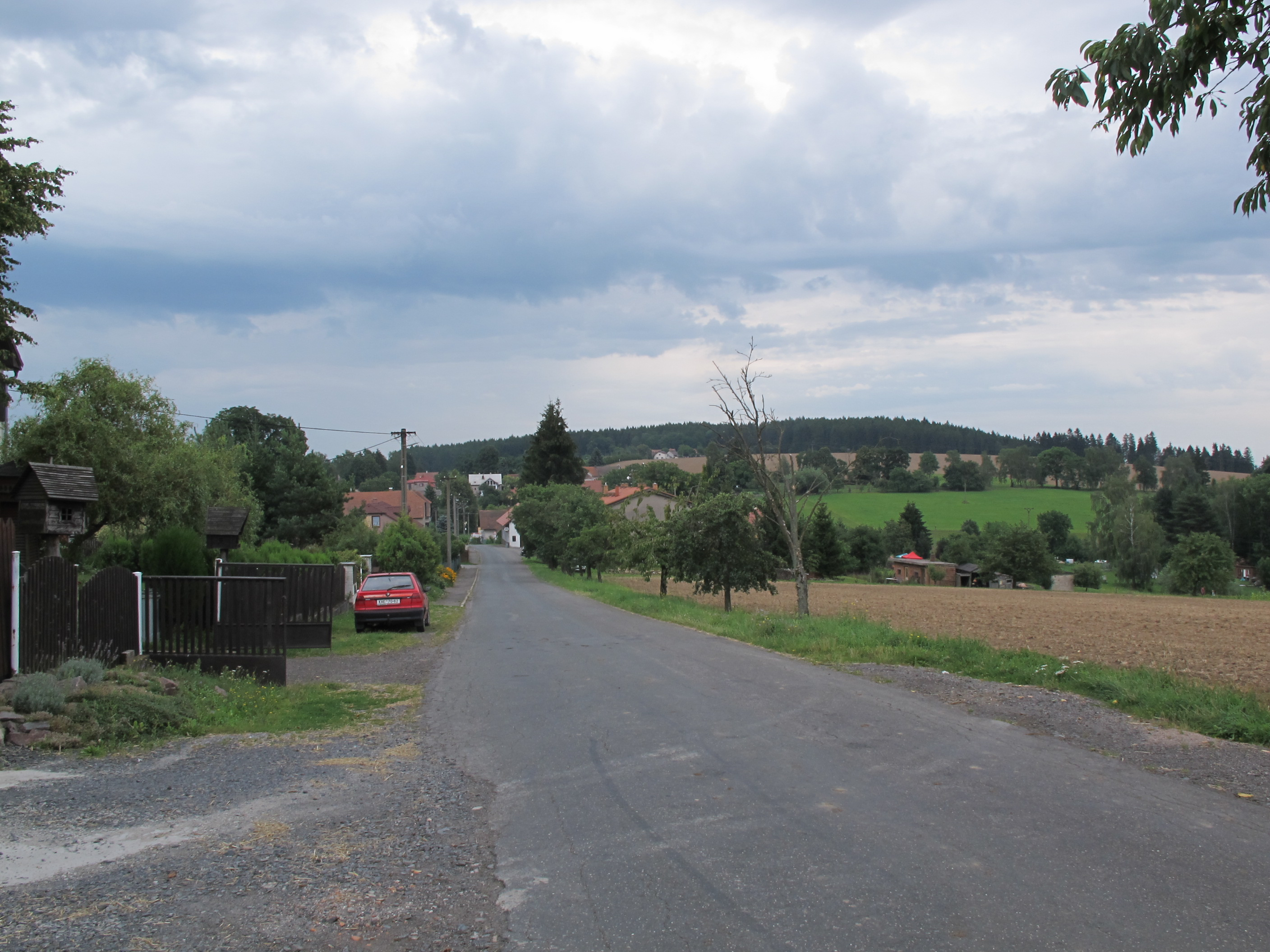
- Road through Rušinov

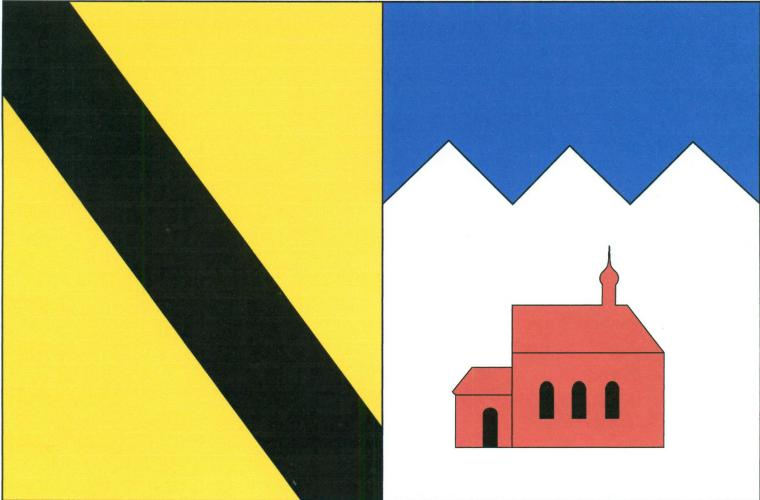
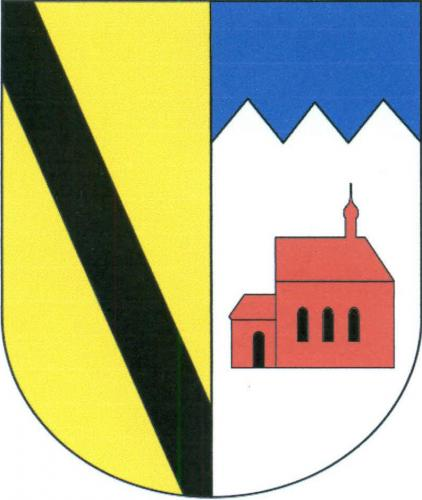
- Flag Coat of arms

- Location in the Czech Republic
- Coordinates: 49°47′31″N 15°40′59″E
- Country: Czech Republic
- Region: Vysočina
- District: Havlíčkův Brod
- First mentioned: 1406

Area
  - Total: 7.57 km^{2} (2.92 sq mi)
- Elevation: 578 m (1,896 ft)

Population (2026-01-01)
  - Total: 164
  - Density: 21.7/km^{2} (56.1/sq mi)
- Time zone: UTC+1 (CET)
  - Summer (DST): UTC+2 (CEST)
- Postal code: 583 01
- Website: obecrusinov.cz

Rušinov is a municipality and village in Havlíčkův Brod District in the Vysočina Region of the Czech Republic. It has about 200 inhabitants.

Rušinov lies approximately 23 kilometres (14 mi) north of Havlíčkův Brod, 45 km (28 mi) north of Jihlava, and 97 km (60 mi) east of Prague.

== Administrative division ==
Rušinov consists of four municipal parts (in brackets population according to the 2021 census):

- Rušinov (132)
- Hostětínky (4)
- Modletín (23)
- Vratkov (6)

== Demographics ==
Historical population
Year	Pop.	±%
1869	618	—
1880	571	−7.6%
1890	562	−1.6%
1900	503	−10.5%
1910	490	−2.6%
1921	441	−10.0%
1930	400	−9.3%
1950	327	−18.2%
1961	351	+7.3%
1970	267	−23.9%
1980	244	−8.6%
1991	173	−29.1%
2001	169	−2.3%
2011	168	−0.6%
2021	165	−1.8%
Source: Censuses

== Notable people ==
- Adolf Míšek (1875–1955), double bassist and composer
