= Luis Manuel de Pando y Sánchez =

Spanish general

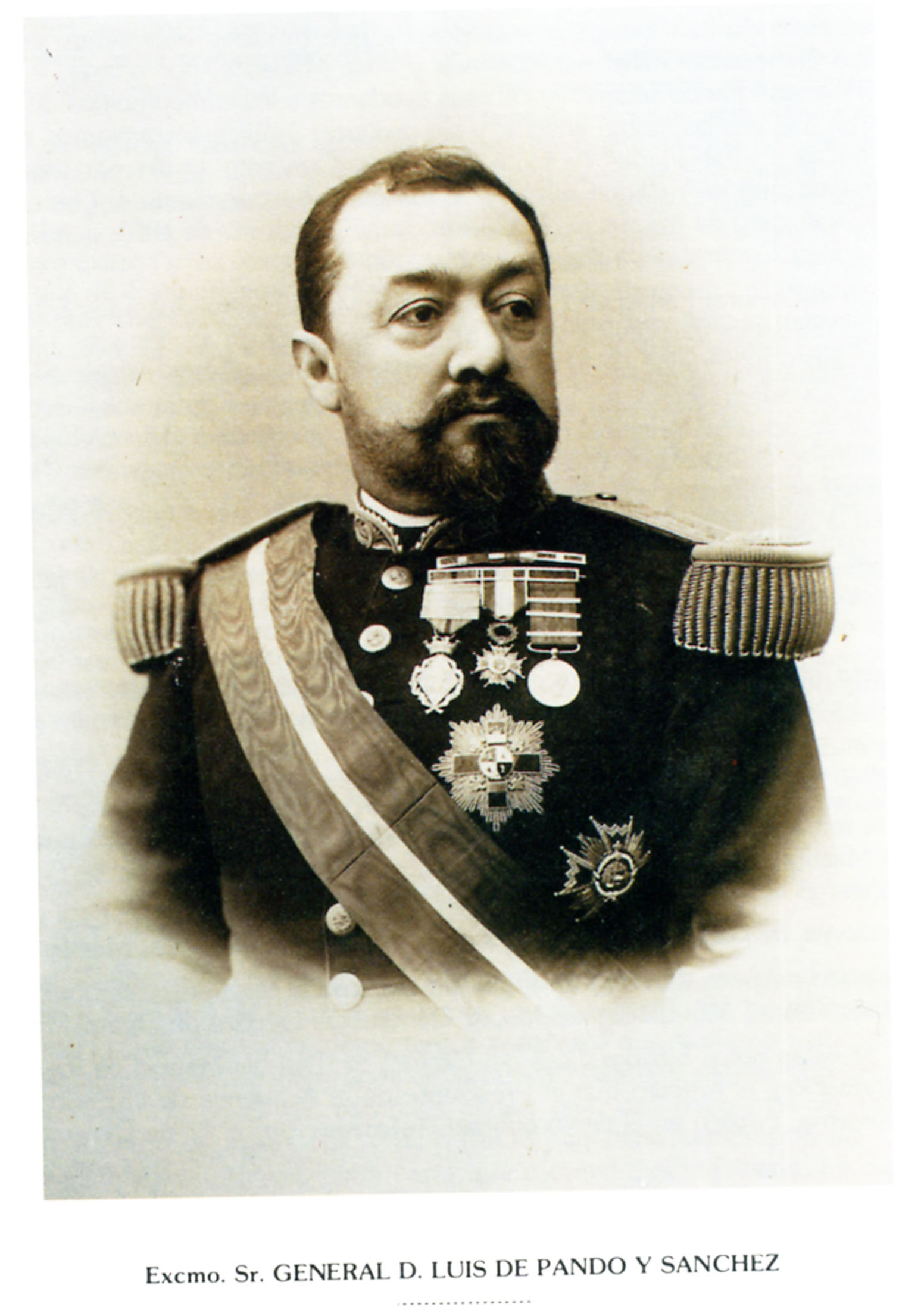
- General Luis Manuel de Pando y Sanchez
- Born: October 18, 1846; Ciudad Rodrigo, Salamanca, Spain
- Died: January 16, 1927 (aged 80); Madrid, Spain
- Military career
- Allegiance: Spain
- Rank: Lieutenant-General

Lieutenant-General Luis Manuel de Pando y Sánchez (October 18, 1846 – January 16, 1927) was a Spanish general during the Spanish–American War, a Civil Governor of the Province of Santiago, Cuba. He was nominated for the Cross of San Fernando, promoted to the rank of Colonel of the Army of the field of battle by His Majesty King Alfonso XII, and the youngest General in the Spanish Army.

== Biography ==
In 1861, he became a cadet at the Artillery Academy, spending the following year at the Academy of Military Engineers. In 1867, he became a Lieutenant of Engineers, and he served in regiments of that corps until 1870, at which time he went to Cuba as a captain, on the battle merits he earned in the canton insurrections on the peninsula. He served in the Great Ten-year War until the end of 1874, having taken part, over those five years, in numerous battles, achieving the rank of commander and Lieutenant-Colonel, and he was awarded the Military Merit Cross. He distinguished himself notably in the battles of Tempú and Jaquecito, under the command of the then Colonel Emilio Callejas, and he was wounded in action in the campaign in the mountains of Tempú and Gota Blanca on 5 November 1870.

On 16 November 1872, based upon his bravery in the battles at Arroyo Salado, in the Oriente Province and at Charco Redondo, he was promoted to the rank of lieutenant-colonel.

Based upon his skill as an engineer, and without giving up his command of a mixed column of engineers and infantry, he was assigned to the construction and reconstruction of telegraph lines.

He continued his operations throughout almost the entire island, under the command of Brigadier Martínez Campos, taking part during those years in 65 battles, with recognition given not only in terms of rank, but also as a lieutenant-colonel, and he was awarded the Red Cross of Military Merit four times for various battles, being transferred then to the peninsula, where he took part in the Carlist Wars, under the command of General Fajardo in the Army of the North; he distinguished himself notably in those battles, and took over the positions of the Carlists at Monte Esquinza, San Cristóbal, Lorca and Lacar; with the force of engineers under his command, he contained a disorganized retreat of a brigade, bringing the brigade back together and resolving a difficult situation. General Fajardo, in that war, recognized that: "Lieutenant-Colonel Pando exceeded himself, multiplying his actions under my command, saving the troops from the situation of having been surrounded at Monte Esquinza, commanding the forces that broke through the lines, despite his having been wounded, without abandoning the command of his forces until he had successfully completed his heroic mission." For that reason, he was nominated for the Cross of San Fernando, and promoted to the rank of Colonel of the Army of the field of battle by His Majesty King Alfonso XII.

With General Fajardo's having given up his command of his division, Colonel Pando was given the command of a brigade, reporting to Arsenio Martínez Campos, General-in-Chief of the Army of Catalonia, taking part in the main battles of the Carlist Wars in that Army of Catalonia, and serving, in addition, in the Engineering Section of that army. With that brigade, he took the Mirabent Castle, and directed the operations that resulted in the taking over of the Carlist site in the city of Morella; shortly after, he conquered the plaza at Cantavieja. In addition, he took over the site of Puigcerdá, and commanded the attack at Seo de Urgel, taking that location over after seven days of combat, and being congratulated in front of his troops by General Martínez Campos.

On 11 August 1875, under the command of General Martínez Campos, he directed the assault on the tower and fort held by the enemy at Solsona, which he carried out through fierce combat, in which he was twice gravely wounded. That campaign, at Seo de Urgel, defined the end of the Carlist Wars. The General-in-Chief, in unusual terms, asked in a telegraph that the government award Colonel Pando the rank of brigadier, and this was granted by a decree on the same day; Pando became part of the Chiefs of Staff of the Generals of the Army, when he was not yet thirty years old, leaving the Corps of Military Engineers, in which he retained the rank of captain. He was the youngest general in the Spanish Army.

In 1877, having completely recovered from his wounds, he went to Cuba, and on the orders of General Martínez Campos, Pando, as Head of Brigade, directed operations in Guáimaro and Guantánamo, notable distinguishing himself through to the end of the Ten Years' War, and receiving the Great Cross of Military Merit. He was appointed Civil Governor and Commandant-General of the province of Pinar de Río.

In 1879, he took command of a brigade in the Departments of Holguin and Tunas, with the task of completely pacifying that territory, where the war that had been called Chiquita had been reborn; through peaceful means, he was able achieve the surrender of the Cuban chiefs Peralta and Guerra, and all of their troops. General Pando was heartily congratulated, and for his services was awarded the Great Cross of Isabel the Catholic.

Once the departments of Tunas and Holguin had been pacified, he was sent to command the Guantánamo Brigade, carrying out a campaign that was more political than military, and bringing about in just a few months the surrender of Generals Guillermo Moncada and José Maceo, and then, finally, that of Luis Feria, at San Luis; General Pando, with only his adjutants, went to the camps of the generals, requiring that they surrender those camps, as friends, and without provoking useless bloodbaths, convincing them of the minimum probability of success of any resistance. With this, the so-called Chiquita War came to an end; in reality, it had lasted only eleven months. General Pando, as a reward for his success at pacification, was named field marshal on 30 June 1880, reporting to the captain-general of the island, at La Habana.

In 1881, while stationed at La Habana, General Pando made several trips to the United States in order to meet with the person expected to become the President of the United States, Grover Cleveland, a great friend and admirer of Spain; the goal was to achieve something that was satisfying to Cuba, to the Cubans, to the United States and to Spain. Cleveland proposed a Great Sugar Treaty, so that Cuba could enjoy a standard of living to which it had a right based upon its culture, civilization, and natural resources. And Cleveland also felt that it would be prudent to protect the still embryonic Panama Canal with a naval base as close as possible to the canal, at the eastern end of Cuba.

At the end of 1881, Pando was named Commandant-General and Civil Governor of the province of Santiago de Cuba, a position he held until May 1885, when he returned to the peninsula, where he held various positions.

From 1886 to 1898, he was elected to the position of Deputy of the Courts for the provinces of Pinar del Río and Santiago de Cuba, which he represented alternatively in the Congress.

In 1891, he was promoted to lieutenant-general, based upon his length of service, after having for eleven years served as Field Marshal or Division General; he had also been elected as a Senator for various provinces on the peninsula.

As lieutenant-general, he held high military positions, and then, once again, went to Cuba, with Martínez Campos having been named captain-general of the island at the beginning of the War of Independence; Martínez Campos put Pando in charge of the First and Third Army Corps. He returned to Spain shortly after resigning from the command of General Martínez Campos, and he returned to Cuba with General Blanco, as Head of the Joint Chiefs of Staff of the Army of Operations in Cuba. A rift occurred between Spanish Captain General Blanco and his Chief of Staff General Pando in Havana as Blanco refused Pando's request to send 10,000 troops to reinforce Santiago against the invasion.

For a number of accomplishments during the war, he was awarded the Great Cross of Military Merit.

== Personal life ==
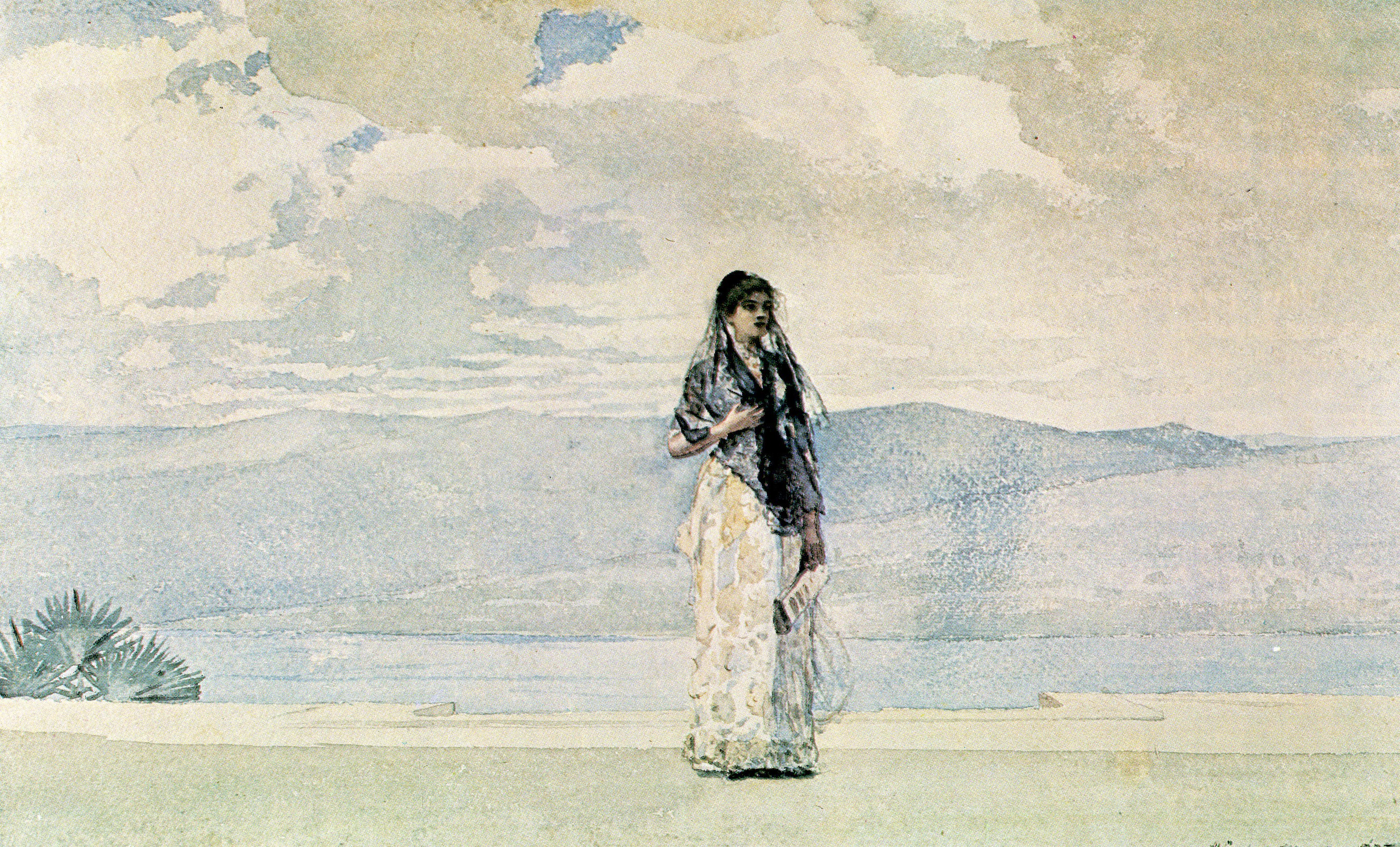
Portrait of the General's Wife painted by American watercolorist Winslow Homer. Painting currently in the permanent collection of the Rhode Island Institute of Art.

In 1885, the general married a French lady named Cecilia Armand-Roche and had one son, Francisco de Pando y Armand, who later became the most influential leader in Cuba's sugar industry.
