= Tom Glesby =

Canadian boxer

Personal information
- Born: July 17, 1969 (age 57) Welland, Ontario, Canada
Medal record
Men's Boxing
Representing Canada
Youth and Junior World Boxing Championships
Silver medal – second place	1987 Havana	Light-heavyweight
Pan American Games
Bronze medal – third place	1991 Havana	Heavyweight

Thomas Glesby (born July 17, 1969) is a Canadian former professional boxer who competed from 1993 to 2001. As an amateur, he competed at the Summer Olympics: in 1988 and 1992. Nicknamed "The Bomb" he won the bronze medal in the men's heavyweight division at the 1991 Pan American Games in Havana, Cuba.

== 1988 Olympic results ==
Below is the record of Tom Glesby, a Canadian heavyweight boxer who competed at the 1988 Seoul Olympics:

- Round of 32: defeated Claus Nielsen (Denmark) referee stopped contest in the second round
- Round of 16: lost to Gyula Alvics (Hungary) referee stopped contest in the second round

== Professional boxing record ==
26 Wins (19 knockouts, 7 decisions), 3 Losses (3 knockouts, 0 decisions), 1 Draw Archived March 31, 2015, at the Wayback Machine
Result	Record	Opponent	Type	Round	Date	Location	Notes
Loss	40-4	(United States) Lou Savarese	TKO	3	12/06/2001	(United States) Astro Pavilion, Houston, Texas, U.S.	Referee stopped the bout at 1:13 of the third round.
Win	5-7	(United States) Antonio Colbert	UD	6	25/06/2000	(United States) Majestic Star Casino, Gary, Indiana, U.S.	
Win	10-12	(United States) Val Smith	PTS	6	27/05/2000	(United States) Detroit, Michigan, U.S.	
Loss	17-0	(United States) Robert Davis	TKO	5	02/12/1999	(United States) Memorial Coliseum, Corpus Christi, Texas, U.S.	Referee stopped the bout at 2:59 of the fifth round.
Win	23-14-1	(United States) Jeff Lally	TKO	3	24/06/1999	Windsor, Ontario, Canada	Referee stopped the bout at 2:05 of the third round.
Win	8-45-4	(United States) Andre Crowder	TKO	1	24/09/1998	(United States) Madison, Tennessee, U.S.	
Win	11-61-2	(United States) Brian Yates	TKO	3	09/09/1998	(United States) Louisville, Kentucky, U.S.	
Win	9-10-2	(United States) Tosand Jewell	TKO	2	30/07/1998	(United States) Heart of St. Charles Banquet Center, Saint Charles, Missouri, U.S.	Referee stopped the bout at 2:40 of the second round.
Win	14-3	(United States) Fred Houpe	RTD	3	22/06/1996	Prince George, British Columbia, Canada	
Win	11-5	(United States) Jim Huffman	UD	10	25/01/1996	International Plaza Hotel, Toronto, Ontario, Canada	
Win	11-10-2	(United States) Guy Sonnenberg	RTD	6	25/10/1995	Mayfield Inn, Edmonton, Alberta, Canada	
Win	8-9-2	(United States) John Kiser	UD	10	11/08/1995	Welland Arena, Welland, Ontario, Canada	
Win	17-17	(United States) Carl "Little Truth" Williams	KO	2	27/06/1995	Edmonton Convention Centre, Edmonton, Alberta, Canada	Williams knocked out at 1:31 of the second round.
Win	15-14-3	(United States) George O'Mara	TKO	1	28/04/1995	Edmonton Convention Centre, Edmonton, Alberta, Canada	
Loss	9-1	(Nigeria) Josh Imardiyi	TKO	2	15/11/1994	(United States) Erie Civic Center, Erie, Pennsylvania, U.S.	
Win	9-6-1	(United States) Bill Corrigan	KO	1	21/10/1994	Winnipeg Convention Centre, Winnipeg, Manitoba, Canada	Corrigan knocked out at 1:14 of the first round.
Win	22-7	(Mexico) Mauricio Villegas	UD	10	15/09/1994	Edmonton Convention Centre, Edmonton, Alberta, Canada	
Win	9-2	(Jamaica) Everton Davis	TKO	9	21/06/1994	(United States) MGM Grand Las Vegas, Las Vegas, Nevada, U.S.	Referee stopped the bout at 1:22 of the ninth round.
Win	11-13-2	(United States) Mike DeVito	TKO	2	09/06/1994	(United States) Monroeville, Pennsylvania, Canada	
Win	37-16-1	(United States) Jeff Lampkin	UD	10	22/03/1994	Edmonton Convention Centre, Edmonton, Alberta, Canada	
Win	22-20-1	(Canada) Ken Lakusta	KO	2	17/02/1994	Edmonton Convention Centre, Edmonton, Alberta, Canada	Canada Heavyweight Title.
Win	15-14-2	(Canada) Dave Fiddler	TKO	2	02/12/1993	Northlands Agricom, Edmonton, Alberta, Canada	Canada Heavyweight Title. Referee stopped the bout at 1:08 of the second round.
Win	8-0	(United States) Martin Foster	TKO	1	19/11/1993	(United States) Atlantic City Convention Center, Atlantic City, New Jersey, U.S.	
Win	2-5-1	(Mexico) José Macias Chong	KO	2	02/10/1993	Grant MacEwan College, Edmonton, Alberta, Canada	Chong knocked out at 1:37 of the second round.
Win	10-9-2	(United States) Ken Jackson	TKO	4	17/08/1993	(United States) Casino Magic, Bay Saint Louis, Mississippi, U.S.	
Draw	3-3	(United States) Sajad Abdul Aziz	PTS	4	23/07/1993	(United States) Lansing, Michigan, U.S.	
Win	20-19-2	(Canada) Conroy Nelson	KO	4	29/06/1993	Varsity Arena, Toronto, Ontario, Canada	Canada Heavyweight Title. Nelson knocked out at 0:50 of the fourth round.
Win	10-5	(United States) Mike Faulkner	UD	6	14/04/1993	Fairmont Royal York, Toronto, Ontario, Canada	
Win	3-1	(United States) Isaac Knapper	TKO	1	26/03/1993	Sheraton Centre Toronto Hotel, Toronto, Ontario, Canada	Referee stopped the bout at 1:44 of the first round.
Win	14-10-1	(United States) Kevin P Porter	TKO	1	11/02/1993	Niagara Falls Memorial Arena, Niagara Falls, Ontario, Canada	Referee stopped the bout at 2:12 of the first round.
