= Gytis Juškevičius =

Lithuanian boxer (born 1966)

Personal information
- Nationality: Lithuanian
- Born: 22 February 1966 (age 59) Rokiškis, Lithuanian SSR, Soviet Union

Sport
- Sport: Boxing

Gytis Juškevičius (born 22 February 1966) is a Lithuanian boxer. He competed in the men's super heavyweight event at the 1992 Summer Olympics.
