= István Szikora =

Hungarian boxer

Personal information
- Nationality: Hungarian
- Born: 5 March 1964 (age 61); Mátészalka, Hungary

Sport
- Sport: Boxing

István Szikora (born 5 March 1964) is a Hungarian boxer. He competed in the men's super heavyweight event at the 1992 Summer Olympics.
