= Jerry Nijman =

Dutch boxer

Jerry Hendrik Marius Nijman (born August 10, 1966 in Paramaribo) is a retired boxer from The Netherlands, who was born in Suriname. He represented Netherlands at the 1992 Summer Olympics in Barcelona, Spain, where he was eliminated in the second round of the super heavyweight division (+ 91 kg) by Germany's Wilhelm Fischer.
