= Harold Arroyo =

Puerto Rican boxer

Personal information
- Born: 18 February 1961 (age 65)
Medal record
Men's Boxing
Representing Puerto Rico
Pan American Games
| Silver medal – second place | 1991 Havana | Super Heavyweight |
Central American and Caribbean Games
| Silver medal – second place | 1990 Mexico City | Super Heavyweight |

Harold Arroyo (born February 18, 1961) is a retired boxer from Puerto Rico. In 1988, Arroyo won the Batalla de Carabobo, defeating Luis Reinoso, winning a 3-2 split decision. In 1989, Arroyo fought Jeffrey Nedd in the 10th anniversary gala for the Aruban Boxing Association, losing on points. He won the silver medal in the Men's Super Heavyweight (+ 91 kg) division at the 1991 Pan American Games. Arroyo also represented his native country at the 1988 Summer Olympics, where he was defeated in the second round by Poland's Janusz Zarenkiewicz.
