= Chris Odera =

Kenyan boxer (1963–2012)

Personal information
- Born: 12 December 1963
- Died: 27 November 2012 (aged 48)
Medal record
Men's Boxing
Representing Kenya
All-Africa Games
Gold medal – first place	1987 Nairobi	Super-heavyweight

Crispine "Chris" Odera (12 December 1963 – 27 November 2012) was a boxer from Kenya, who is best known for winning the gold medal in the men's super-heavyweight division (+ 91 kg) at the 1987 All-Africa Games in Nairobi, Kenya. He represented his native country at the 1988 Summer Olympics in Seoul, South Korea, where he was knocked down in the second round by eventual gold medal winner Lennox Lewis from Canada.
