= Jeong Seung-won (boxer) =

Korean male boxer

Personal information
- Nationality: South Korean
- Born: 29 August 1970 (age 54)

Sport
- Sport: Boxing

Jeong Seung-won (born 29 August 1970) is a South Korean boxer. He competed in the men's super heavyweight event at the 1992 Summer Olympics.
