= Giraldo Cordova Cardin International Boxing Tournament =

Cuban boxing tournament

Tournament information
- Sport: Boxing
- Location: Havana, La Habana Province, Cuba
- Established: 1968

The Giraldo Cordova Cardin International Boxing Tournament (also known as the Córdova Cardín Memorial Tournament) was established by the Cuban Boxing Federation in 1968 in Havana, Cuba.

It is Cuba's annual major amateur boxing competition. The tournament is named after Giraldo Cordova Cardin, a young revolutionary boxing enthusiast who took part in the 1953 assault on the Moncada Barracks in Santiago de Cuba.

== Early history ==
The first Giraldo Cordova Cardin International Boxing Tournament was held in Havana from May 18 to 22, 1968.

From June 27 to July 5, 1981, in Havana, 19 countries participated in the international tournament, which featured a U.S. team for the first time.

In 2000, Felix Savon won his 15th International Giraldo Cordova Cardin title leading Cuba's sweep of 12 gold medals at the boxing tournament in Havana.

== Notable participants ==
- Teofilo Stevenson
- Felix Savon
- Erislandy Lara
- Yordenis Ugás
- Guillermo Rigondeaux
- Robson Conceicao
- Robeisy Ramirez
