= Peter Hrivňák =

Slovak boxer

Personal information
- Nationality: Slovak
- Born: 6 May 1965 (age 59); Košice, Czechoslovakia

Sport
- Sport: Boxing

Peter Hrivňák (born 6 May 1965) is a Slovak boxer. He competed at the 1988 Summer Olympics and the 1992 Summer Olympics.
