= Andreas Schnieders =

German boxer (1966–2022)

Personal information
- Nationality: German
- Born: 22 December 1966 Lastrup, Lower Saxony, West Germany
- Died: 6 October 2022 (aged 55) Lingen, Lower Saxony, Germany

Sport
- Sport: Boxing
Medal record
Men's boxing
Representing Germany
European Amateur Boxing Championships
| Silver medal – second place | 1991 Gothenburg | Super Heavyweight |

Andreas Schnieders (22 December 1966 – 6 October 2022) was a German boxer.

He competed in the men's super heavyweight event at the 1988 Summer Olympics.

After his career ended in 1994 he worked as a security guard at the Emsland Nuclear Power Plant. He had a wife, with whom he had two sons.

Schnieders committed suicide on October 6, 2022.
