= Oleg Platov =

Ukrainian boxer

Personal information
- Nickname: DniproHulk
- Nationality: (Ukraine) Ukrainian
- Born: Олег Платов; 8 April 1983 (age 43) Dnipropetrovsk, Ukrainian SSR, Soviet Union
- Weight: Heavyweight

Boxing career
- Stance: Orthodox

Boxing record
- Total fights: 32
- Wins: 30
- Win by KO: 22
- Losses: 1
- Draws: 0
- No contests: 1

Oleg Platov (born 8 April 1983 in Dnipropetrovsk, Ukrainian SSR, Soviet Union) is a Ukrainian former professional boxer who fought in the heavyweight division.

== Professional career ==
=== Debut fight ===
After leaving the amateurs ranks Platov was based in Belgium when he became a professional. His first pro bout was in May 2001, winning in Bruges, Belgium, when Platov beat fellow debutant French fighter Jacques Bret with a first round knockout.

=== Belgian base ===
Platov fought his first 20 fights in Belgium, suffering only one defeat which was a points defeat to Ludovic Mace. He faced Mace again six months later and avenged the loss, KO'ing Mace in the third round.

=== First belt ===
Whilst still based in Belgium, Platov fought for his first title belt against Belarusian Igor Shukala in Brussels, Belgium for the vacant WBC World Youth heavyweight title. Platov knocked the previously unbeaten Shukala out in the first round to take the title.

On November 4, 2006, he fought the former #1 contender Henry Akinwande and won a split decision. This was his greatest achievement, as Akinwande's record at the time was 49–2 and he had fought for the WBC title against Lennox Lewis previously. In December 2007 he fought Danny Williams, another former title contender. The bout ended with a no-decision after Platov was cut over the left eye following an accidental headbutt and the referee stopped the contest.

Platov was then inactive for just over a year, before returning against Jason Gavern, in Zurich, Switzerland. Platov won a clear 8-round decision, flooring Gavern in the sixth round.

Over the next four years, Platov only fought 3 more times, winning them all. His final bout was in November 2012, when he fought in America for the first time, knocking out Harold Sconiers in 2 rounds - his record after this fight was W-30; L-1. D-0; 1 No Contest.

== Professional boxing record ==
32 fights	30 wins	1 loss
By knockout	24	0
By decision	6	1
No contests	1	

No.	Result	Record	Opponent	Type	Round, time	Date	Location	Notes
32	Win	30–1 (1)	Harold Sconier	KO	2 (6), 1:46	16 Nov 2012	Jai Alai Fronton, Miami, Florida, U.S.	
31	Win	29–1 (1)	Gbenga Oloukun	TKO	6 (10), 2:27	5 Jun 2010	Jahnsportforum, Neubrandenburg, Germany	
30	Win	28–1 (1)	Daniil Peretyatko	UD	8	28 Jun 2009	Max-Schmeling-Halle, Berlin, Germany	
29	Win	27–1 (1)	Jason Gavern	UD	8	20 Dec 2008	Hallenstadion, Zurich, Switzerland	
28	NC	26–1 (1)	Danny Williams	NC	4 (12), 2:15	8 Dec 2007	St. Jakobshalle, Basel, Switzerland	IBF Inter-Continental heavyweight title at stake; NC after Platov was cut from an accidental head clash
27	Win	26–1	Miyan Solomons	TKO	2 (8), 2:29	27 Oct 2007	Messehalle, Erfurt, Germany	
26	Win	25–1	Colin Wilson	TKO	10 (12), 1:43	14 Apr 2007	Porsche-Arena, Stuttgart, Germany	Retained IBF Inter-Continental heavyweight title
25	Win	24–1	Zoltán Pető	KO	1 (4)	17 Feb 2007	Complexe Sportif, Evere, Belgium	
24	Win	23–1	Henry Akinwande	SD	12	4 Nov 2006	RWE Rhein-Ruhr Sporthalle, Mülheim, Germany	Won IBF Inter-Continental heavyweight title
23	Win	22–1	Tamás Borbély	TKO	1 (8)	23 Sep 2006	Karl Eckel Halle, Hattersheim am Main, Germany	
22	Win	21–1	Colin Kenna	TKO	5 (8)	22 Apr 2006	SAP Arena, Mannheim, Germany	
21	Win	20–1	Stephane Tessier	KO	4 (8)	17 Dec 2005	Max-Schmeling-Halle, Berlin, Germany	
20	Win	19–1	Mindaugas Kulikauskas	TKO	3 (6)	8 Oct 2005	Namur, Namur Province, Belgium	
19	Win	18–1	Thierry Guezouli	TKO	2 (6)	28 May 2005	Sporthal Schiervelde, Roeselare, Belgium	
18	Win	17–1	Alexey Osokin	UD	6	22 Jan 2005	Salle Belle-Vue, Dinant, Belgium	
17	Win	16–1	Aleksandrs Borhovs	KO	1 (6)	25 Dec 2004	Sporthal, Izegem, Belgium	
16	Win	15–1	Ihar Shukala	KO	1 (10)	4 Dec 2004	Palais du Midi, Brussels, Belgium	Won vacant WBC Youth heavyweight title
15	Win	14–1	Edgars Kalnars	KO	7 (8)	1 Nov 2004	Sporthall, Izegem, Belgium	
14	Win	13–1	Marian Tudor	TKO	1 (6)	25 Sep 2004	Palais du Midi, Brussels, Belgium	
13	Win	12–1	Štefan Cirok	TKO	1 (6)	28 May 2004	Evere, Brussels-Capital Region, Belgium	
12	Win	11–1	Roger Foe	KO	1 (6)	22 Nov 2003	Andenne, Namur Province, Belgium	
11	Win	10–1	Marek Oravský	TKO	1 (6)	27 Sep 2003	Spiroudome Arena, Charleroi, Belgium	
10	Win	9–1	Ludovic Mace	KO	3 (6)	7 Jun 2003	Sporthal Schiervelde, Roeselare, Belgium	
9	Win	8–1	Gábor Farkas	KO	1 (6)	10 May 2003	Kuipke, Ghent, Belgium	
8	Win	7–1	Leonardo Petullo	KO	1 (6)	15 Feb 2003	La Louvière, Hainaut Province, Belgium	
7	Win	6–1	Ivo Eduvaldo	TKO	1 (6)	18 Jan 2003	Brussels, Brussels-Capital Region, Belgium	
6	Loss	5–1	Ludovic Mace	PTS	6	26 Dec 2002	Izegem, West Flanders, Belgium	
5	Win	5–0	Frank Wuestenberghs	KO	1 (4)	28 Sep 2002	Evere, Brussels-Capital Region, Belgium	
4	Win	4–0	Frank Wuestenberghs	UD	4	16 Feb 2002	Sint-Truiden, Limburg, Belgium	
3	Win	3–0	Manfred Kong	MD	4	27 Oct 2001	Brussels, Brussels-Capital Region, Belgium	
2	Win	2–0	Radmilo Šoda	TKO	3 (4)	3 Jun 2001	Evere, Brussels-Capital Region, Belgium	
1	Win	1–0	Jacques Bret	KO	1 (4)	1 May 2001	Bruges, West Flanders, Belgium	
