= Andrzej Wawrzyk =

Polish boxer (born 1987)

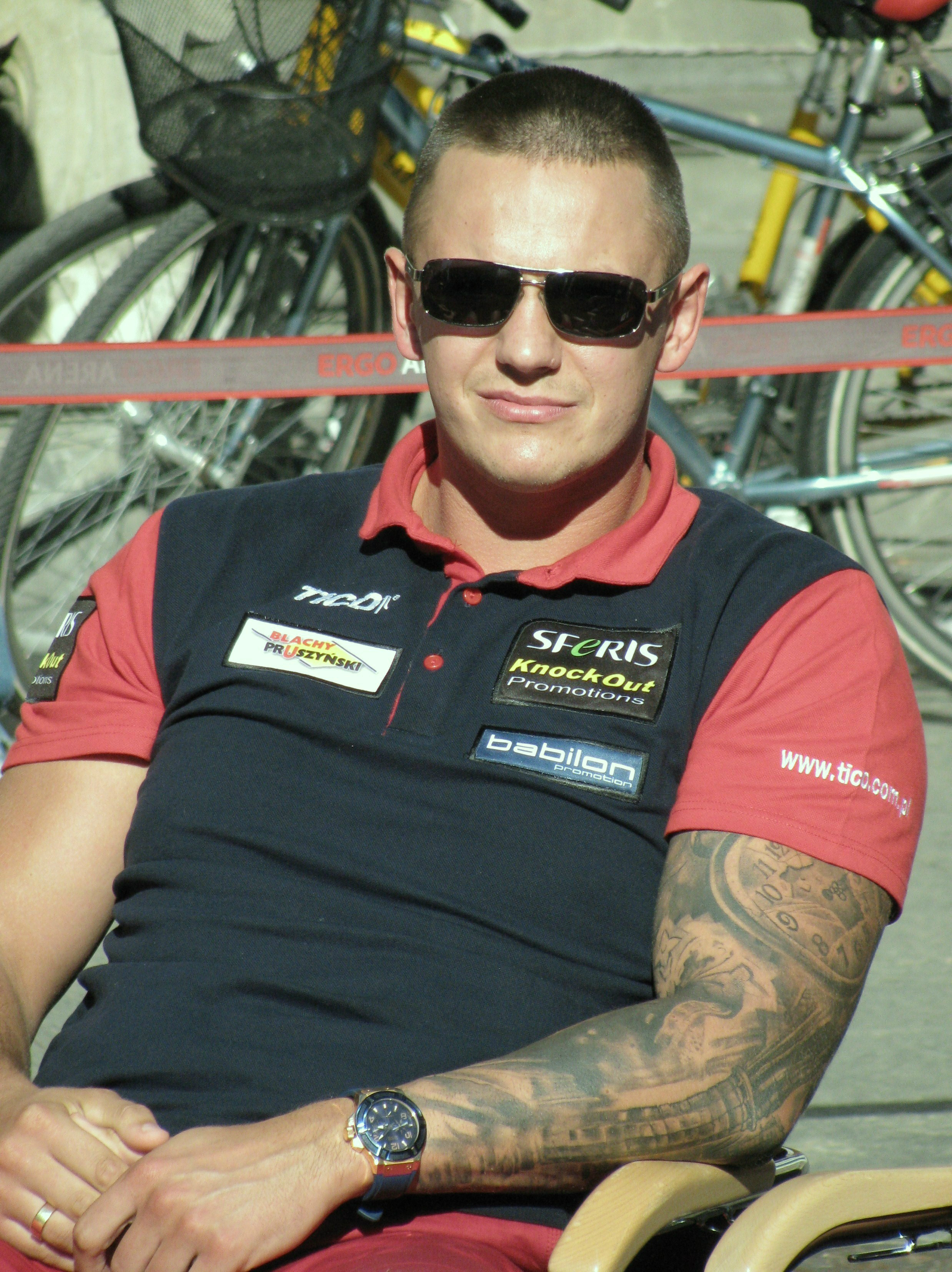

Personal information
- Nationality: (Poland) Polish
- Born: Andrzej Wawrzyk; 26 September 1987 (age 38) Kraków, Poland
- Height: 195 cm (6 ft 5 in)
- Weight: Heavyweight

Boxing career
- Reach: 201 cm (79 in)
- Stance: Orthodox

Boxing record
- Total fights: 39
- Wins: 34
- Win by KO: 20
- Losses: 5
- Draws: 0
- No contests: 0

Andrzej Wawrzyk (born 26 September 1987) is a Polish professional boxer. He has challenged once for the WBA (Regular) heavyweight title in 2013.

== Amateur career ==
Wawrzyk won the European junior title 2006 beating future world champion Ciocan in the semifinal.

At the World Junior Championships 2006 he lost to eventual runner-up Sardor Abdullayev 9:15 in the quarter-final.

== Professional career ==
Wawrzyk turned professional on 18 November 2006, winning his first professional bout by four-round unanimous decision. From his pro debut to March 2013, Wawrzyk racked up an impressive record of 27–0, 14 KOs.

On 17 May 2013 he travelled to Russia to challenge for the WBA (regular) heavyweight title held by Alexander Povetkin, and in doing so suffered his first professional loss by third-round TKO. In 2014, Wawrzyk scored two notable wins over former British and Commonwealth heavyweight champion Danny Williams by first-round TKO, and former IBF world heavyweight champion Francois Botha by fifth-round TKO. In September 2016, he defeated former world heavyweight title challenger Albert Sosnowski by sixth-round TKO.

His next professional contest was scheduled for February 2017 against reigning and undefeated WBC heavyweight champion Deontay Wilder in Birmingham, Alabama. But Wilder was forced to find a new opponent for the next defence of his WBC heavyweight title after Wawrzyk failed a drug test (Stanozolol).

== Professional boxing record ==
39 fights	34 wins	5 losses
By knockout	20	4
By decision	14	1

No.	Result	Record	Opponent	Type	Round, time	Date	Location	Notes
39	Loss	34–5	Damian Knyba	TKO	3 (10) 2:20	1 Feb 2025	Prudential Center, Newark, New Jersey, US	
38	Loss	34–4	Richard Lartey	KO	4 (8) 0:58	13 Apr 2024	The Dome at the Ballpark, Rosemont, Illinois, U.S.	
37	Loss	34–3	Kubrat Pulev	UD	10	14 Dec 2023	The Hangar, Costa Mesa, California, U.S.	
36	Win	34–2	Kamil Bodzioch	TKO	1 (8) 2:22	7 Jul 2023	Donald E. Stephens Convention Center, Rosemont, Illinois, U.S.	
35	Loss	33–2	Michal Boloz	KO	2 (6) 2:18	30 Sep 2022	Hala Sportowa im. Olimpijczykow, Łomża, Poland	
34	Win	33–1	Albert Sosnowski	TKO	6 (10), 0:01	17 Sep 2016	Ergo Arena, Gdańsk, Poland	Won vacant Polish heavyweight title
33	Win	32–1	Marcin Rekowski	TKO	7 (10), 0:42	2 Apr 2016	Kraków Arena, Kraków, Poland	
32	Win	31–1	Mike Sheppard	TKO	3 (10), 2:59	26 Sep 2015	Legacy Arena, Birmingham, Alabama, U.S.	
31	Win	30–1	Patryk Kowoll	KO	2 (8), 1:03	21 Jul 2015	Legia Fight Club, Warsaw, Poland	
30	Win	29–1	Francois Botha	TKO	5 (10), 1:56	15 Mar 2014	Hotel Arlamow, Arłamów, Poland	
29	Win	28–1	Danny Williams	TKO	1 (10), 2:01	1 Feb 2014	Okraglak Halle, Opole, Poland	
28	Loss	27–1	Alexander Povetkin	TKO	3 (12), 2:23	17 May 2013	Crocus City Hall, Krasnogorsk, Russia	For WBA (Regular) heavyweight title
27	Win	27–0	Robert Hawkins	UD	6	23 Mar 2013	Hala Sportowa, Częstochowa, Poland	
26	Win	26–0	Dennis Bakhtov	UD	10	2 Jun 2012	Hala Luczniczka, Bydgoszcz, Poland	Won WBA International heavyweight title
25	Win	25–0	Claus Bertino	UD	10	18 Feb 2012	Hala RAFAKO, Racibórz, Poland	
24	Win	24–0	Nelson Dario Dominguez	KO	2 (10), 2:21	12 Nov 2011	Hala Sportowa, Gdynia, Poland	
23	Win	23–0	Devin Vargas	TKO	9 (10), 1:40	10 Sep 2011	Stadion Miejski, Wrocław, Poland	
22	Win	22–0	Andreas Sidon	KO	1 (8), 2:55	25 Jun 2011	Hala na Podpromiu, Rzeszów, Poland	
21	Win	21–0	Ivica Perkovic	UD	8	5 Mar 2011	Krynica-Zdrój, Poland	
20	Win	20–0	Pavel Dolgovs	UD	6	25 Sep 2010	Torwar Hall, Warsaw, Poland	
19	Win	19–0	Paul Butlin	UD	8	15 May 2010	Atlas Arena, Łódź, Poland	
18	Win	18–0	Lee Swaby	UD	8	20 Mar 2010	Strzelce Opolskie, Poland	
17	Win	17–0	Harvey Jolly	UD	8	19 Jan 2010	UIC Pavilion, Chicago, Illinois, U.S.	
16	Win	16–0	Oleksiy Mazikin	UD	10	18 Dec 2009	MOSiR Hall, Łódź, Poland	Retained WBC Youth heavyweight title
15	Win	15–0	Raymond Ochieng	TKO	5 (10), 2:07	9 May 2009	Hala Sportowa, Gdynia, Poland	Retained WBC Youth heavyweight title
14	Win	14–0	Edgars Kalnars	RTD	3 (10), 3:00	28 Feb 2009	Lublin, Poland	
13	Win	13–0	Tomasz Bonin	UD	10	29 Nov 2008	Spodek, Katowice, Poland	Retained WBC Youth heavyweight title
12	Win	12–0	Harry Duiven Jr.	KO	8 (10), 1:56	18 Oct 2008	MOSiR Hall, Zabrze, Poland	Won WBC Youth heavyweight title
11	Win	11–0	Aleksandrs Selezens	UD	6	31 May 2008	Hala Widowiskowo-Sportowa, Legnica, Poland	
10	Win	10–0	Marcin Najman	TKO	2 (10), 1:35	19 Apr 2008	Spodek, Katowice, Poland	Won vacant Polish heavyweight title
9	Win	9–0	Yavor Marinchev	UD	6	8 Dec 2007	St. Jakob Halle, Basel, Switzerland	
8	Win	8–0	Laszlo Esztan	TKO	1 (6), 1:02	20 Oct 2007	Expo Center, Warsaw, Poland	
7	Win	7–0	Stefan Cirok	TKO	1 (6), 2:15	14 Oct 2007	Hala Polonia, Częstochowa, Poland	
6	Win	6–0	Drazen Ordulj	RTD	6 (6), 3:00	29 Sep 2007	EWE Arena, Oldenburg, Germany	
5	Win	5–0	Ante Lovric	TKO	2 (4), 1:04	14 Apr 2007	Porsche-Arena, Stuttgart, Germany	
4	Win	4–0	Peter Oravec	TKO	1 (4), 1:33	24 Mar 2007	OSiR, Wołów, Poland	
3	Win	3–0	Aliaksandr Mazaleu	TKO	4 (4)	3 Mar 2007	StadtHalle Rostock, Rostock, Germany	
2	Win	2–0	Martin Stenský	TKO	2 (4), 1:01	25 Nov 2006	Torwar Hall, Warsaw, Poland	
1	Win	1–0	Ervín Slonka	UD	4	18 Nov 2006	Sporthalle, Steyr, Austria	

== See also ==
- List of current WBC youth world champions
