= Nikolai Valuev vs. David Haye =

Boxing competition

David vs Goliath
- Date: 7 November 2009
- Venue: Nuremberg Arena, Nuremberg, Bavaria, Germany
- Title(s) on the line: WBA Heavyweight Championship

Tale of the tape
Boxer	(Russia) Nikolai Valuev	(United Kingdom) David Haye
Nickname	"The Russian Giant"	"The Hayemaker"
Hometown	Saint Petersburg, Russia	Bermondsey, London, UK
Purse		£2,100,000
Pre-fight record	50–1 (34 KO)	22–1 (21 KO)
Age	36 years, 2 months	29 years
Height	7 ft 0 in (213 cm)	6 ft 3 in (191 cm)
Weight	316 lb (143 kg)	217 lb (98 kg)
Style	Orthodox	Orthodox
Recognition	WBA; Heavyweight Champion; The Ring; No. 5 Ranked Heavyweight	WBA; No. 4 Ranked Heavyweight; The Ring; No. 7 Ranked Heavyweight

Result
- Haye wins via majority decision (114-114, 116-112, 116-112)

Nikolai Valuev vs. David Haye, billed as David vs Goliath, was a professional boxing match contested on 7 November 2009 for the WBA heavyweight championship.

== Background ==
After regaining the WBA title with a unanimous decision over fellow former Champion John Ruiz, Nikolai Valuev had made one defence gaining a very controversial majority decision over Evander Holyfield, he agreed to "Champion in Recess" Ruslan Chagaev, who had given Valuev the only defeat of career. However their fight on 30 May 2009 in Helsinki, Finland at the Hartwall Arena, was cancelled when Chagaev was declared medically unfit after failing a Finnish medical test, allegedly due to hepatitis, although he would go on to face Wladimir Klitschko in June losing via a 9th round RTD.

Haye had moved to the Heavyweight division after he had unified the WBA, WBC & WBO cruiserweight titles against Enzo Maccarinelli, knocking out Monte Barrett in November 2008. He was first set to face WBC Champion Vitali Klitschko, then Haye agreed to face his brother Wladimir, however he pulled out with a back injury and was replaced with Chagaev.

In July Valuev and Haye agreed to meet in November, despite John Ruiz claiming that he had inherited the mandatory status from Chagaev as the next highest ranked contender. He would later agree to face the winner of Valuev vs Haye.

== The fight ==
Haye was able to outmove and outbox the much slower Valuev by using a circle, stick and move strategy, which would give a majority decision victory. Haye suffered a broken hand during the fight while hitting Valuev's head, saying it was like hitting a brick wall. The win made Haye the fourth Briton to win a major heavyweight title, after Bob Fitzsimmons, Lennox Lewis, and Frank Bruno, as well as only the second former cruiserweight champion to win a heavyweight title after Evander Holyfield.

== Aftermath ==
Valuev would retire after the fight, while Haye would agree to face Ruiz in a mandatory defence.

== Undercard ==
Confirmed bouts:

Winner	Loser	Weight division/title belt(s) disputed	Result
(United States) John Ruiz	(Turkey) Adnan Serin	Heavyweight (10 rounds)	7th-round TKO.
(Puerto Rico) Francisco Palacios	(United States) DeLeon Tinsley	Cruiserweight (8 rounds)	1st-round TKO.
(Finland) Robert Helenius	(Ukraine) Taras Bidenko	Heavyweight (8 rounds)	3rd-round RTD.
(Belarus) Siarhei Liakhovich	(United States) Jeremy Bates	Heavyweight (8 rounds)	1st-round TKO.
(United Kingdom) George Groves	(Belarus) Kanstantsin Makhankou	Super Middleweight (8 rounds)	Unanimous decision
(Germany) Alexander Frenkel	(United States) Kelvin Davis	Cruiserweight (8 rounds)	1st-round TKO.
(Austria) Marcos Nader	(Italy) Ciro Ciano	Middleweight (6 rounds)	Unanimous decision
(Bulgaria) Kubrat Pulev	(United States) Gbenga Oloukun	Heavyweight (6 rounds)	Unanimous decision

== Broadcasting ==
Country	Broadcaster
Canada	Viewers Choice
Denmark	TV2 Sport
Germany	ARD
Hungary	Viasat 6
Philippines	Solar Sports
Poland	Polsat
United Kingdom	Sky Sports
United States	Direct TV

Preceded by vs. Evander Holyfield	Nikolai Valuev's bouts 7 November 2009	Retired
Preceded by vs. Monte Barrett	David Haye's bouts 7 November 2009	Succeeded by vs. John Ruiz
