= Taras Bidenko =

Ukrainian boxer

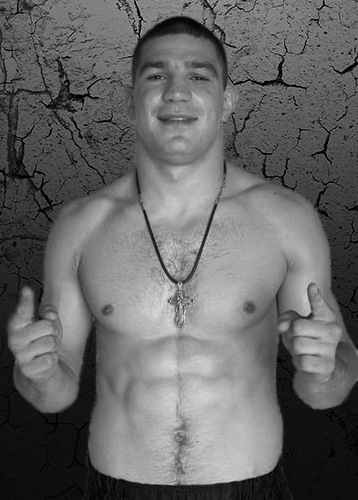

Personal information
- Nationality: Ukrainian
- Born: Тарас Біденко; 8 February 1980 (age 46) Kyiv, Ukrainian SSR, Soviet Union
- Weight: Heavyweight
- Website: http://bidenko.club

Boxing career
- Stance: Orthodox

Boxing record
- Total fights: 34
- Wins: 28
- Win by KO: 12
- Losses: 6
- Draws: 0
- No contests: 0

Taras Bidenko (born February 8, 1980, in Kyiv, Ukrainian SSR, Soviet Union) is a German-based professional boxer who fights in the heavyweight division.

== Professional career ==
Bidenko boxed as an amateur before turning professional in June 2000, winning his first fight in Mariupol, Ukraine, in which Bidenko beat Kyiv fighter Stanislav Tomkatchov on the undercard of an Alexander Gurov fight.

In only his fourth professional fight, Bidenko fought Nikolay Valuev in July 2002 in Seoul, South Korea for the Pan Asia PABA Heavyweight Title. Valuev at the time had a record of 28–0 and had vastly more experience than Bidenko at the time and Valuev won the fight on points over twelve rounds.

He later moved to Germany where he lost his second fight to hard-punching Volodymyr Virchis by late KO (he was leading at that point) but beat amateur star Alex Mazikin and several clubfighters like George Arias and Cisse Salif. In 2008 he outpointed respected Michael Sprott.

He was defeated by Denis Boytsov on June 6, 2009, by technical knockout in the sixth round.

== Professional boxing record ==
28 Wins (12 knockouts, 16 decisions), 6 Losses (4 knockouts, 2 decisions)
Result	Record	Opponent	Type	Round	Date	Location	Notes
Loss	28-6	(Poland) Artur Szpilka	RTD	2 (10)	20/04/2013	Hala Podpromie, Rzeszów, Poland	
Loss	28-5	(Syria) Mahmoud Charr	UD	12	30/03/2012	(Germany) Maritim Hotel, Cologne, North Rhine-Westphalia	WBC International Silver Heavyweight Title. 111-116, 111-116, 111-116.
Win	28-4	(Latvia) Pavels Dolgovs	UD	6	24/09/2011	(Germany) Dima-Sportcenter, Lohbruegge, Hamburg	
Win	27-4	(Romania) Christian Hammer	MD	6	04/12/2010	(Germany) Sport and Congress Center, Schwerin, Mecklenburg-Vorpommern	57-57, 58-56, 58-56.
Loss	26-4	(Finland) Robert Helenius	RTD	3	07/11/2009	(Germany) Nuremberg Arena, Nuremberg, Bavaria	Bidenko did not come out for the fourth round.
Loss	26-3	(Russia) Denis Boytsov	TKO	6	06/06/2009	(Germany) Koenig Pilsener Arena, Oberhausen, North Rhine-Westphalia	WBA Intercontinental/WBO European Heavyweight Titles. Referee stopped the bout at 2:00 of the sixth round.
Win	26-2	(United Kingdom) Michael Sprott	UD	10	31/05/2008	(Germany) Burg-Waechter Castello, Düsseldorf, North Rhine-Westphalia	97-93, 97-94, 97-93.
Win	25-2	(Mali) Cisse Salif	UD	12	19/01/2008	(Germany) Burg-Waechter Castello, Düsseldorf, North Rhine-Westphalia	WBA Intercontinental Heavyweight Title. 119-109, 118-110, 120-108.
Win	24-2	(Brazil) George Arias	UD	12	20/10/2007	(Germany) Gerry Weber Stadium, Halle, North Rhine-Westphalia	WBA Intercontinental Heavyweight Title. 119-109, 117-111, 119-109.
Win	23-2	(Netherlands) Richel Hersisia	UD	12	30/06/2007	(Germany) Porsche-Arena, Stuttgart, Baden-Württemberg	WBA Intercontinental Heavyweight Title. 115-113, 115-113, 117-111.
Win	22-2	(Dominican Republic) Fernely Feliz	UD	12	17/03/2007	(Germany) Hanns-Martin-Schleyer-Halle, Stuttgart, Baden-Württemberg	WBA Intercontinental Heavyweight Title. 118-110, 117-111, 118-110.
Win	21-2	(Croatia) Ivica Perkovic	RTD	5	05/12/2006	(Austria) Freizeit Arena, Soelden	Perkovic did not come out for the sixth round.
Win	20-2	(Germany) Andreas Sidon	TKO	9	28/10/2006	(Germany) Porsche-Arena, Stuttgart, Baden-Württemberg	WBA Intercontinental Heavyweight Title. Referee stopped the bout at 2:17 of the ninth round.
Win	19-2	(Ukraine) Oleksiy Mazikin	MD	10	22/08/2006	(Germany) Universum Gym, Wandsbek, Hamburg	German International Heavyweight Title. 97-93, 96-94, 95-95.
Win	18-2	(Argentina) Fabio Eduardo Moli	TKO	6	12/05/2006	Orfeo Superdomo, Cordoba, Argentina	WBA Fedelatin Heavyweight Title. Referee stopped the bout at 2:06 of the sixth round.
Win	17-2	(Russia) Alexey Osokin	UD	8	15/04/2006	(Germany) Maritim Hotel, Magdeburg, Saxony-Anhalt	
Win	16-2	(Sweden) Aldo Colliander	UD	8	24/01/2006	(Germany) Universum Gym, Wandsbek, Hamburg	78-74, 78-74, 78-74.
Win	15-2	(Switzerland) Nuri Seferi	UD	10	28/09/2005	(Germany) Color Line Arena, Altona, Hamburg	German International Heavyweight Title. 97-92, 97-92, 97-92.
Loss	14-2	(Ukraine) Volodymyr Virchis	TKO	12	29/03/2005	(Germany) Sporthalle, Wandsbek, Hamburg	WBO Intercontinental Heavyweight Title. Referee stopped the bout at 1:54 of the 12th round.
Win	14-1	(Romania) Constantin Onofrei	TKO	7	14/12/2004	(Austria) Freizeit Arena, Soelden	WBO Intercontinental/German International Heavyweight Titles.
Win	13-1	(Slovakia) Peter Simko	TKO	1	26/10/2004	(Germany) Scandlines Arena, Rostock, Mecklenburg-Vorpommern	
Win	12-1	(United Kingdom) Julius Francis	UD	10	21/09/2004	(Germany) Universum Gym, Wandsbek, Hamburg	100-90, 99-91, 99-91.
Win	11-1	(Brazil) Daniel Frank Silva	KO	1	31/07/2004	(Germany) Hanns-Martin-Schleyer-Halle, Stuttgart, Baden-Württemberg	Frank knocked out at 1:54 of the first round.
Win	10-1	(Mexico) Agustin Corpus	UD	6	24/04/2004	(United States) Staples Center, Los Angeles, California	59-54, 59-54, 59-54.
Win	9-1	(Belarus) Siarhei Dychkou	UD	6	30/03/2004	(Germany) Saaltheater Geulen, Aachen, North Rhine-Westphalia	60-54, 60-54, 60-54.
Win	8-1	(United States) Franklin Edmondson	KO	1	17/02/2004	(Germany) Hansehalle, Lübeck, Schleswig-Holstein	
Win	7-1	(Brazil) Edegar Da Silva	TKO	1	31/01/2004	(Venezuela) Poliedro de Caracas, Caracas	
Win	6-1	(Brazil) Gilberto Melo	KO	3	18/11/2003	(Germany) Universum Gym, Wandsbek, Hamburg	
Win	5-1	(Ukraine) Andriy Zadachin	PTS	4	24/10/2002	(Ukraine) Poltava	
Win	4-1	(Ukraine) Vladyslav Andreev	KO	4	10/10/2002	(Russia) Casino Conti, Saint Petersburg	PABA Heavyweight Title.
Loss	3-1	(Russia) Nikolay Valuev	UD	12	21/07/2002	(South Korea) Seoul	PABA Heavyweight Title. 111-118, 112-116, 111-117.
Win	3-0	(Armenia) Suren Kalachyan	UD	4	29/03/2002	(Ukraine) Circus, Lviv	
Win	2-0	(Russia) Nikolai Sorinov	TKO	2	06/03/2002	(Ukraine) Fastiv	
Win	1-0	(Ukraine) Stanyslav Tovkachov	TKO	5	17/06/2000	(Ukraine) Dramatic Theatre, Mariupol	
