= Nikolai Valuev vs. Evander Holyfield =

Boxing competition

Valuev vs. Holyfield
- Date: 20 December 2008
- Venue: Hallenstadion, Zürich, Switzerland
- Title(s) on the line: WBA Heavyweight Championship

Tale of the tape
Boxer	(Russia) Nikolai Valuev	(United States) Evander Holyfield
Nickname	"The Russian Giant"	"The Real Deal"
Hometown	Saint Petersburg, Russia	Atlanta, Georgia, U.S.
Purse		$700,000
Pre-fight record	49–1 (34 KO)	42–9–2 (27 KO)
Age	35 years, 3 months	46 years, 2 months
Height	7 ft 0 in (213 cm)	6 ft 2 in (188 cm)
Weight	310 lb (141 kg)	214 lb (97 kg)
Style	Orthodox	Orthodox
Recognition	WBA; Heavyweight Champion; The Ring; No. 4 Ranked Heavyweight	WBA; No. 13 Ranked Heavyweight; Former 2-division undisputed world champion

Result
- Valuev defeated Holyfield via Majority decision (115-114, 116-112, 114-114)

Nikolai Valuev vs. Evander Holyfield was a professional boxing match contested on 20 December 2008 for the WBA heavyweight championship.

== Background ==
After only winning two of his last nine fights, including a three fight losing streak at the end (going 2–5–2 from 1999 to 2004), four-time heavyweight champion Evander Holyfield was suspended indefinitely by the New York State Athletic Commission amid health concerns following a poor performance against Larry Donald in which the then 42-year-old Holyfield was nearly swept by Donald on all three judge's scorecards. Following the suspension, Holyfield was out of boxing for 21 months before announcing his return in June 2006 to take on Jeremy Bates in August of that year. Holyfield would win the first four fights of his comeback and eventually landed a world title shot against WBO heavyweight champion Sultan Ibragimov on 13 October 2007, but lost by a lopsided unanimous decision. Holyfield would take a year-long layoff, but eventually accepted an offer from WBA heavyweight Nikolai Valuev to challenge him for the title on 20 December 2008. Valuev was in his second reign as WBA heavyweight champion, having defeated John Ruiz to claim the vacant title in his previous fight. As in virtually every fight he had been in, the 7 foot, 310-pound Valuev had a distinct size advantage as he was ten inches taller and nearly 100 pounds heavier than Holyfield. Holyfield accepted a pay day of around $700,000, his lowest purse for a heavyweight title fight and a far cry from the record $35 million he had earned for his second fight against Mike Tyson. This would mark the first time Holyfield had contested the WBA belt since his third fight with John Ruiz in 2001.

== The Fight ==
Though the fight was largely uneventful and featured no knockdowns, Holyfield narrowly missed making history by winning his fifth world title and becoming the oldest heavyweight champion in boxing history (surpassing George Foreman) and instead lost to Valuev by a closely contested, and disputed, majority decision. Holyfield kept his distance from Valuev for most of the fight but appeared to clearly outpunch Valuev, who did not sustain much offense during the fight. Nevertheless, when the fight went to the official scorecards, one judge had Valuev winning by a score of 115–114 (six rounds to five, one even) and the second had a score of 116–112 (eight rounds to four), while the third had the fight even at 114–114 (six rounds apiece).

The decision was controversial, with veteran announcer Nick Charles stating "That is the worst display of officiating I have ever seen." ESPN's Dan Rafael wrote "you can make more of a legitimate argument that Holyfield won all 12 rounds than you can make one that Valuev claimed at least seven to take the fight."

== Aftermath ==
Valuev would go on to face former unified cruiserweight champion David Haye, losing via a majority decision and retiring three days later.

Holyfield would continue on for three more fights before finally retiring just before he turned 50, therefore this fight marked the final world title bout in his long career, 22 years, 5 months, 9 days after his first against Dwight Muhammad Qawi for the WBA cruiserweight title in July 1986.

== Undercard ==
Confirmed bouts:

Winner	Loser	Weight division/title belt(s) disputed	Result
(Italy) Francesco Pianeta	(France) Johann Duhaupas	EBU-EU (European Union) Heavyweight Championship	Unanimous decision
(Germany) Nadia Raoui	(United States) Eileen Olszewski	WIBA World flyweight Championship	Split Draw
(Denmark) Mads Larsen	(Italy) Roberto Cocco	Light Heavyweight (10 rounds)	7th-round TKO.
(Ukraine) Oleg Platov	(United States) Jason Gavern	Heavyweight (8 rounds)	Unanimous decision
(Russia) Jimmy Kapanov	(Italy) Paolo Ferrara	Cruiserweight (8 rounds)	Unanimous decision
(Canada) Bermane Stiverne	(United States) Lyle McDowell	Heavyweight (8 rounds)	1st-round KO.

== Broadcasting ==
Country	Broadcaster
Denmark	TV2
Germany	ARD
Hungary	Sport 1
Mexico	Televisa
Poland	Polsat
USA	Integrated Sports PPV

Preceded by vs. John Ruiz II	Nikolai Valuev's bouts 20 December 2008	Succeeded by vs. David Haye
Preceded by vs. Sultan Ibragimov	Evander Holyfield's bouts 20 December 2008	Succeeded by vs. Francois Botha
