= Rogério Lobo =

Rogério Lobo is the name of:

- Roger Lobo (Rogério Hyndman Lobo, 1923–2015), Macanese businessman, philanthropist and politician in Hong Kong
- Rogério Lobo (boxer) (1971–2006), Brazilian cruiserweight boxer
