= Nikolai Valuev =

Russian politician and boxer (born 1973)

- Николай Валуев
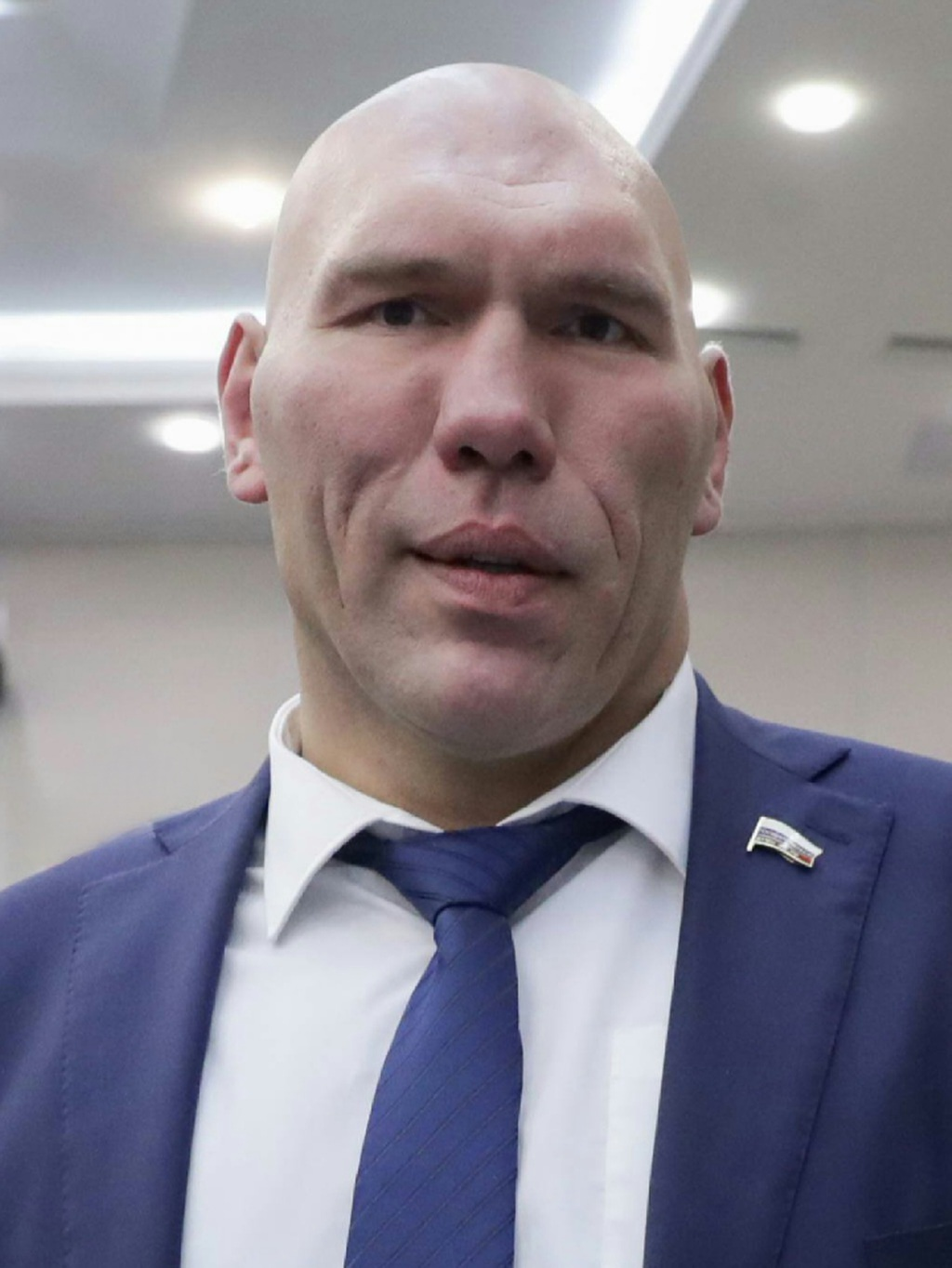
- Valuev in 2021

Member of the State Duma for Bryansk Oblast
- Incumbent
- Assumed office 12 October 2021
- Preceded by: Boris Paykin
- Constituency: Bryansk (No. 77)

Member of the State Duma (Party List Seat)
- In office 21 December 2011 – 12 October 2021

Personal details
- Born: 21 August 1973 (age 53) Leningrad, Soviet Union
- Party: United Russia
- Spouse: Galina Valuyeva
- Children: 3
- Education: Lesgaft National University; Moscow State University of Technology and Management
- Boxing career
- Nicknames: Beast from the East; The Russian Giant
- Height: 2.13 m (7 ft 0 in) (Note: Sources vary on his height, with some listing him as 2.18 m (7 ft 2 in).)
- Weight: Heavyweight
- Reach: 216 cm (85 in)
- Stance: Orthodox

Boxing record
- Total fights: 53
- Wins: 50
- Win by KO: 34
- Losses: 2
- No contests: 1

Nikolai Sergeyevich Valuev (Russian: Николай Сергеевич Валуев, IPA: [vɐˈlujɪf]; born 21 August 1973) is a Russian politician and former professional boxer. He competed in boxing from 1993 to 2009, and held the World Boxing Association (WBA) heavyweight title twice between 2005 and 2009. At a height of 2.13 metres (7 feet) and a peak weight of 151 kilograms (333 pounds), Valuev is best known for being the tallest and heaviest world champion in boxing history. He is also the first heavyweight champion to have finished his career without ever being knocked down, and he is the fifth to have never been stopped. (Note: Preceded by Gene Tunney, Rocky Marciano, Riddick Bowe and Sultan Ibragimov.)

== Biography ==
Valuev was born on 21 August 1973, in Leningrad, Soviet Union (now Saint Petersburg, Russia). His parents are short, unlike his Tatar ancestor "of mountainous proportions", and Valuev had previously denied that his own size was due to medical issues such as gigantism complicated by acromegaly, instead arguing for it being a question of genetics. However, in 2009 he was diagnosed with acromegaly and has since stated that he has it.

Valuev is a Russian Orthodox Christian.

Valuev has written a book in Russian called My 12 Rounds, with the help of Russian sports journalist Konstantin Osipov. The book discusses his life in general and his boxing career in particular. For that book, Valuev received an award from the government of Saint Petersburg.

In January 2006, Valuev was accused of assaulting a security guard at the Spartak Ice Palace in Saint Petersburg. No criminal investigation was launched by local police.

== Amateur career ==
=== Highlights ===
Russian National Championships (+91 kg), Saint Petersburg, Russia, May 1994:

- 1/4: Lost to Alexei Lezin

Goodwill Games (+91 kg), Saint Petersburg, July 1994:

- 1/4: Lost to Alexei Lezin (Russia) on points, 8–+8ut.

== Professional career ==
=== First reign as WBA heavyweight champion ===
In 2005, Valuev squared off with WBA heavyweight champion John Ruiz, and won a twelve-round majority-decision, becoming both the tallest (7 ft or 2.13 m) and heaviest (324 lbs or 147 kg) champion in boxing history.

==== Valuev vs. Chagaev ====
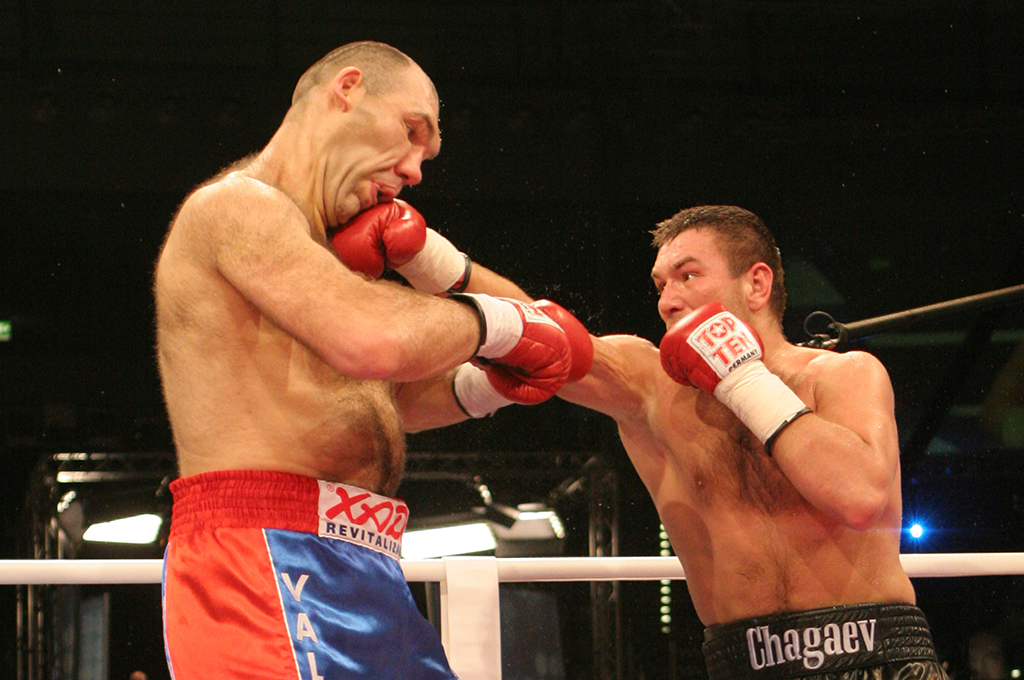
Valuev vs. Chagaev, 2007

The title defense was held on 14 April 2007. Chagaev defeated Valuev by a majority decision (117–111, 115–113 and 114–114).

Valuev changed trainers, from Manuel Gabrielian to Alexander Zimin, who coached the old Soviet Union amateur boxing team. On 29 September 2007, Valuev won against Jean-Francois Bergeron in Oldenburg, Germany, by a 12-round unanimous decision (118–111 on all three cards).

=== Between title reigns ===
==== Valuev vs. Liakhovich ====
On 16 February 2008, in a title eliminator, Valuev defeated former titleholder Siarhei Liakhovich, winning every round at the Nuremberg Arena in Germany. The victory earned Valuev the right to face Chagaev for the WBA title again, the only man who had defeated him in his boxing career.

=== Second reign as WBA champion ===
==== Valuev vs. Ruiz II ====
He was scheduled to face Chagaev for his WBA title on 5 July 2008, but Chagaev pulled out with an injury. Valuev instead fought John Ruiz for the vacant title on 30 August 2008 and the WBA decided to make Chagaev "Champion In Recess". Valuev defeated Ruiz by unanimous decision to regain the WBA heavyweight championship, with Valuev and Chagaev set to fight no later than 26 June 2009 to determine whom the WBA regarded as their champion. The scores were 114–113, 116–113, and 116–111. The result was initially declared a split decision win for Valuev with the 114–113 score by ringside judge Takeshi Shimakawa was announced in favor of Ruiz rather than for Valuev. One of the scorecards had the names of the fighters in opposite order, resulting in the confusion. The decision was once again unpopular with the live crowd, as some booed the outcome, much like in the first bout.

==== Valuev vs. Holyfield ====
Valuev's first title defense of his second reign as WBA Champion was against the 46-year-old, four-time heavyweight champion of the world, Evander Holyfield, on 20 December 2008. Before the match, Valuev weighed 310.8 pounds (141 kg), nearly 100 pounds heavier than Holyfield at 214.3 pounds (97 kg). After a rather uneventful match with no knockdowns and few punches thrown by either fighter, Valuev won a widely disputed majority decision. In response to the controversial result the WBA announced plans to investigate the decision.

==== Loss to Haye ====
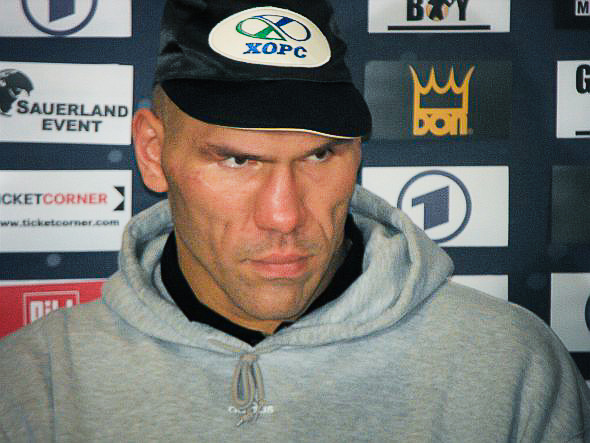
Valuev in 2009

In his second defense on 7 November 2009, billed as 'David vs. Goliath', Valuev faced off against former unified and lineal cruiserweight champion David Haye (22–1, 21 KOs) at the Arena Nürnberger Versicherung in Nuremberg. Valuev lost by a majority decision (114–114, 116–112, 116–112).

==== Retirement from boxing and health problems ====
Valuev announced his retirement from boxing in a Russian newspaper three days after the loss to Haye on 10 November 2009.

In 2010, Valuev's doctor went on record saying that he is treating Valuev for "serious bone and joint problems". Valuev underwent two operations that required at least six months on the sidelines.

Valuev confirmed in 2013 that medical advice was one of the reasons he is not planning to make a comeback in boxing.

== Outside of boxing ==
=== Television career ===
Valuev's first role in a film was a cameo appearance in the German film 7 Zwerge – Der Wald ist nicht genug in 2006. In 2008, Valuev played the main role in the film Stonehead by Philip Yankovskiy, playing an ex-boxer who lost his memory. The film took the main prize at the film festival "Window to Europe". After the success of Stonehead, it was announced Valuev was being filmed in two new films at the same time.

In August 2016, Valuev became a presenter on Good Night, Little Ones!, Russia's long-running TV program for small children. He replaced Dmitry Malikov as the host.

=== Political career ===
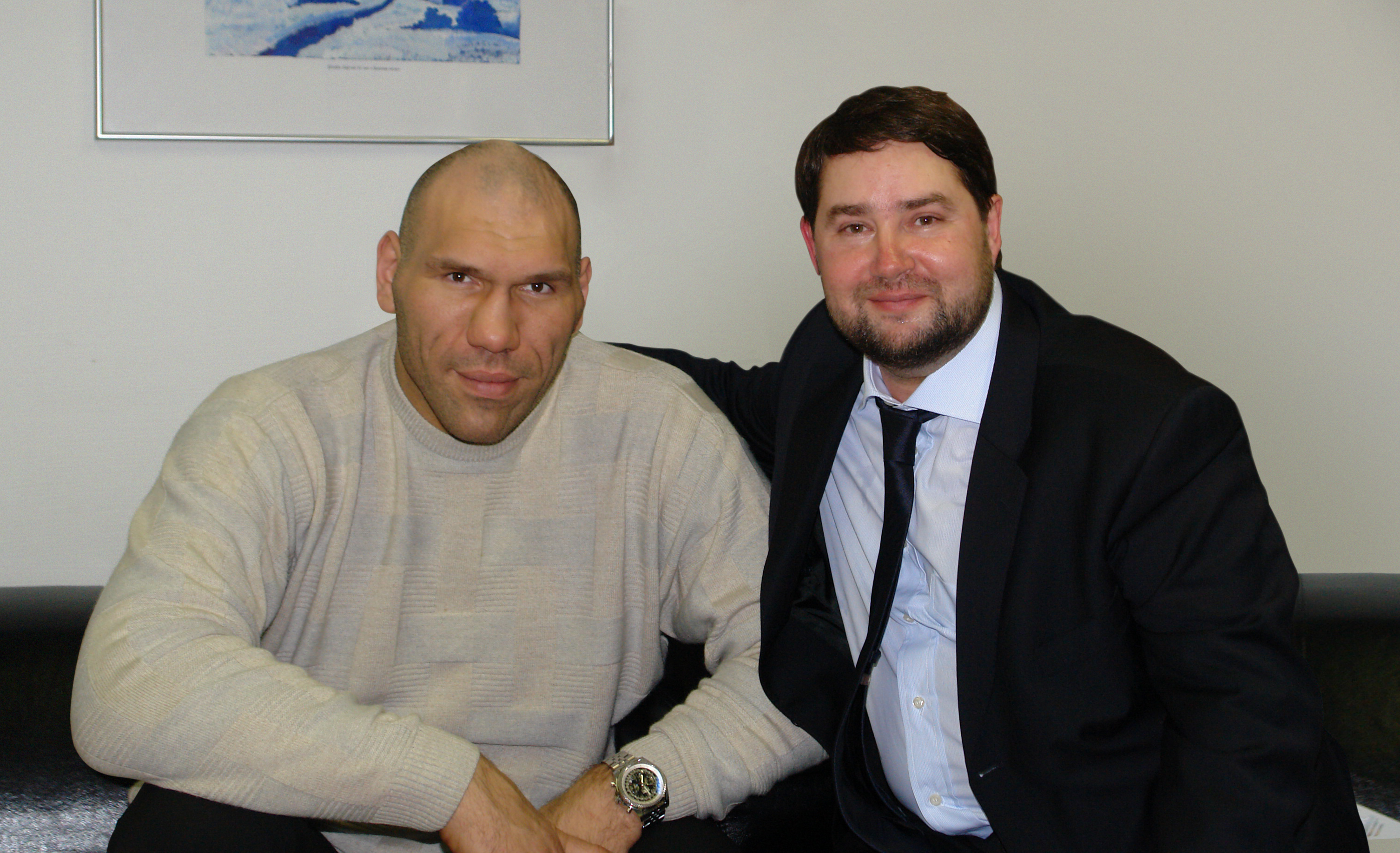
Valuev with Igor Nikitin, 2011

In December 2011 Russian parliamentary election, Valuev became a member of the State Duma through the United Russia Party. On 17 December 2012, Valuev supported the law in the Russian Parliament banning adoption of Russian orphans by citizens of the US.

Following the IOC's decision to suspend Russia from participating in the Olympics under its flag due to the Russian state-sponsored doping scandal, Valuev said that Russia should go to the Olympics and "tear everyone apart to spite these bastards who want to kill our sport."

In September 2022, Valuev revealed he had been drafted to serve in the Russian armed forces.

=== Involvement in other sports ===
In 2011, Valuev became the general manager of the Russia national bandy team, and is tasked with developing the sport in the country. He is also the Vice-President of the Russian Bandy Federation. Bandy is considered a national sport in Russia.

=== Nikolai Valuev Boxing School and Youth Sports Foundation ===
In 2009, Valuev, together with a group of coaches, created the Nikolay Valuev Boxing School, with offices in Saint Petersburg and the Leningrad Oblast. The school is divided into three types of age groups: pupils (school terms 3–5), students (terms 6–8), and adults. School pupils participate and compete in various boxing matches, including the "Valuev Cup" youth boxing tournament, which became a regular competition in Saint Petersburg.

== Professional boxing record ==
52 fights	50 wins	2 losses
By knockout	35	0
By decision	15	2
By disqualification	1	0

No.	Result	Record	Opponent	Type	Round,time	Date	Location	Notes
53	Loss	50–2 (1)	David Haye	MD	12	7 Nov 2009	Nuremberg Arena, Nuremberg, Germany	Lost WBA heavyweight title
52	Win	50–1 (1)	Evander Holyfield	MD	12	20 Dec 2008	Hallenstadion, Zürich, Switzerland	Retained WBA heavyweight title
51	Win	49–1 (1)	John Ruiz	UD	12	30 Aug 2008	Max-Schmeling-Halle, Berlin, Germany	Won vacant WBA heavyweight title
50	Win	48–1 (1)	Siarhei Liakhovich	UD	12	16 Feb 2008	Nuremberg Arena, Nuremberg, Germany	
49	Win	47–1 (1)	Jean Francois Bergeron	UD	12	29 Sep 2007	Small EWE Arena, Oldenburg, Germany	Won NABA heavyweight title
48	Loss	46–1 (1)	Ruslan Chagaev	MD	12	14 Apr 2007	Porsche-Arena, Stuttgart, Germany	Lost WBA heavyweight title
47	Win	46–0 (1)	Jameel McCline	RTD	3 (12), 3:00	20 Jan 2007	St. Jakobshalle, Basel, Switzerland	Retained WBA heavyweight title
46	Win	45–0 (1)	Monte Barrett	TKO	11 (12), 2:12	7 Oct 2006	Allstate Arena, Rosemont, Illinois, US	Retained WBA heavyweight title
45	Win	44–0 (1)	Owen Beck	TKO	3 (12), 2:44	3 Jun 2006	TUI Arena, Hanover, Germany	Retained WBA heavyweight title
44	Win	43–0 (1)	John Ruiz	MD	12	17 Dec 2005	Max-Schmeling-Halle, Berlin, Germany	Won WBA heavyweight title
43	Win	42–0 (1)	Larry Donald	MD	12	1 Oct 2005	Small EWE Arena, Oldenburg, Germany	Retained WBA Inter-Continental heavyweight title
42	Win	41–0 (1)	Clifford Etienne	KO	3 (12)	14 May 2005	Oberfrankenhalle, Bayreuth, Germany	Retained WBA Inter-Continental heavyweight title
41	Win	40–0 (1)	Attila Levin	TKO	3 (12), 2:34	12 Feb 2005	Max-Schmeling-Halle, Berlin, Germany	Retained WBA Inter-Continental heavyweight title
40	Win	39–0 (1)	Gerald Nobles	DQ	4 (12), 0:42	20 Nov 2004	BigBox, Kempten, Germany	Retained WBA Inter-Continental heavyweight title; Nobles disqualified for repeated holding
39	Win	38–0 (1)	Paolo Vidoz	TKO	9 (12), 2:33	9 Oct 2004	Messe, Erfurt, Germany	Won vacant WBA Inter-Continental heavyweight title
38	Win	37–0 (1)	Richard Igbineghu	TKO	6 (10), 1:50	24 Jul 2004	Brandenburg-Halle, Frankfurt, Germany	Won vacant WBA Inter-Continental interim heavyweight title
37	Win	36–0 (1)	Marcelo Domínguez	UD	8	17 Apr 2004	Max-Schmeling-Halle, Berlin, Germany	
36	Win	35–0 (1)	Dicky Ryan	TKO	1 (10), 2:43	28 Feb 2004	Mehrzweckhalle, Dresden, Germany	
35	Win	34–0 (1)	Otis Tisdale	KO	1 (8)	4 Oct 2003	Stadthalle, Zwickau, Germany	
34	Win	33–0 (1)	Bob Mirovic	UD	8	16 Aug 2003	Nürburgring, Nürburg, Germany	
33	Win	32–0 (1)	Vitali Shkraba	TKO	4 (10)	18 Jul 2003	State Circus, Minsk, Belarus	
32	Win	31–0 (1)	Pedro Daniel Franco	UD	12	15 Mar 2003	Yubileyny Sports Palace, Saint Petersburg, Russia	Retained PABA heavyweight title
31	Win	30–0 (1)	Kostiantyn Pryziuk	RTD	3 (10), 3:00	10 Oct 2002	Casino Conti Giant Hall, Saint Petersburg, Russia	Retained Russian heavyweight title
30	Win	29–0 (1)	Taras Bidenko	UD	12	21 Jul 2002	Seoul, South Korea	Retained PABA heavyweight title
29	Win	28–0 (1)	Yaroslav Zavorotnyi	TKO	3 (10)	15 Jun 2002	Druzhba Arena, Donetsk Ukraine	
28	Win	27–0 (1)	Toakipa Tasefa	UD	12	28 Sep 2001	Yubileyny Sports Palace, Saint Petersburg, Russia	Retained PABA heavyweight title
27	Win	26–0 (1)	George Linberger	TKO	1 (12), 1:20	30 Jun 2001	Etess Arena, Atlantic City, New Jersey, US	Won vacant PABA heavyweight title
26	Win	25–0 (1)	Vitali Shkraba	TKO	4 (8)	6 Mar 2001	Arena CSKA, Moscow, Russia	
25	Win	24–0 (1)	Tone Fiso	TKO	1 (12)	29 Oct 2000	Yubileyny Sports Palace, Saint Petersburg, Russia	Retained PABA interim heavyweight title
24	Win	23–0 (1)	Yuriy Yelistratov	UD	12	6 Jun 2000	Yubileyny Sports Palace, Saint Petersburg, Russia	Won vacant PABA interim heavyweight title
23	Win	22–0 (1)	Yuri Nikolaev	TKO	2 (6)	10 Mar 2000	Novosibirsk, Russia	
22	Win	21–0 (1)	Aleksei Varakin	KO	1 (12), 1:30	15 Dec 1999	State Circus, Saint Petersburg, Russia	Retained Russian heavyweight title
21	Win	20–0 (1)	James McQueen	KO	1 (6)	25 Jun 1999	Prague, Czech Republic	
20	NC	19–0 (1)	Andreas Sidon	NC	6	7 May 1999	Prague, Czech Republic	Referee left the ring before the end of the fight
19	Win	19–0	John Tupou	TKO	4 (6), 1:16	13 Feb 1999	Ariake Colosseum, Tokyo, Japan	
18	Win	18–0	Aleksei Osokin	TKO	6 (10)	22 Jan 1999	Casino Conti Giant Hall, Saint Petersburg, Russia	Won vacant Russia heavyweight title
17	Win	17–0	Evgeny Odolsky	KO	1 (6)	19 Dec 1998	Tundra Bar, Saint Petersburg, Russia	
16	Win	16–0	James Gaines	UD	6	9 Jun 1998	State Circus, Moscow, Russia	
15	Win	15–0	Jim Huffman	TKO	2 (6), 0:37	14 Mar 1998	Olympic Stadium, Moscow, Russia	
14	Win	14–0	Sinclair Babb	TKO	1 (6), 2:50	6 Dec 1997	Stockland Stadium, Townsville, Australia	
13	Win	13–0	Alarim Uysal	TKO	2	8 Nov 1997	Ballsporthalle, Frankfurt, Germany	
12	Win	12–0	Kevin Rosier	KO	1	27 Sep 1997	State Circus, Moscow, Russia	
11	Win	11–0	Aug Tanuvasa	TKO	1 (6), 2:44	21 Aug 1997	Bankstown RSL Club, Sydney, Australia	
10	Win	10–0	Rodney Harris	PTS	4	26 Jul 1997	Yokohama Arena, Yokohama, Japan	
9	Win	9–0	Terrell Nelson	TKO	2 (4), 1:26	31 May 1997	Etess Arena, Atlantic City, New Jersey, US	
8	Win	8–0	Manao Navuilawa	TKO	1 (4), 1:24	9 May 1997	Bankstown Sports Club, Sydney, Australia	
7	Win	7–0	Patrick Slade	TKO	1 (4), 1:59	21 Mar 1997	Parramatta RSL Club, Sydney, Australia	
6	Win	6–0	Darren Fearn	RTD	1 (6), 3:00	26 Nov 1996	York Hall, London, England	
5	Win	5–0	Neil Kirkwood	TKO	2 (4)	8 Oct 1996	Battersea Town Hall, London, England	
4	Win	4–0	Sergei Anikeev	KO	2 (4)	16 Feb 1995	State Circus, Saint Petersburg, Russia	
3	Win	3–0	Aleksei Tsygankov	KO	3 (4)	15 Apr 1994	State Circus, Saint Petersburg, Russia	
2	Win	2–0	Aleksandr Vasiliev	PTS	4	22 Feb 1994	State Circus, Saint Petersburg, Russia	
1	Win	1–0	John Morton	TKO	2 (4)	15 Oct 1993	Sporthalle, Schöneberg, Germany	

== Filmography ==
- 2001: The town – issue #89
- 2003: Playing without rules – cameo
- 2006: 7 Zwerge – Der Wald ist nicht genug – cameo
- 2008: Rock Head – Yegor Golovin "Rock Head"
- 2009: Path – a prisoner nicknamed "The Beast"
- 2009: Fight without rules – Nicholas Shafts
- 2011: Antique Watches – cameo
- 2013: Bigfoot Files – himself

== Notes ==
Sporting positions
Regional boxing titles
Vacant Title last held by Nikolay Kulpin	Russia heavyweight champion 22 January 1999 – June 2000; Vacated	Vacant Title next held by Alexey Osokin
Vacant Title last held by Justin Fortune	PABA heavyweight champion Interim title 6 June 2000 – 30 June 2001; Won full title	Vacant Title next held by Taras Bidenko
Vacant Title last held by Kirk Johnson	PABA heavyweight champion 30 June 2001 – July 2004; Vacated	Vacant Title next held by Rob Calloway
New title	WBA Inter-Continental heavyweight champion Interim title 24 July 2004 – 20 November 2004; Won full title	Title discontinued
Vacant Title last held by Wladimir Klitschko	WBA Inter-Continental heavyweight champion 20 November 2004 – 17 December 2005; Won world title	Vacant Title next held by Ruslan Chagaev
Preceded by Jean Francois Bergeron	NABA heavyweight champion 29 September 2007 – November 2007; Vacated	Vacant Title next held by Friday Ahunanya
World boxing titles
Preceded by John Ruiz	WBA heavyweight champion 17 December 2005 – 14 April 2007	Succeeded by Ruslan Chagaev
Vacant Title last held by Ruslan Chagaev	WBA heavyweight champion 30 August 2008 – 7 November 2009	Succeeded by David Haye
Records
Preceded by Henry Akinwande and Vitali Klitschko; 2.01 m (6 ft 7 in)	Tallest world champion 2.14 m (7 ft 0 in); 17 December 2005 – present	Incumbent
Previous: Primo Carnera vs. Tommy Loughran; 84 lb (38 kg)	Largest weight disparity in a title match 105.5 lb (47.9 kg) vs. Monte Barrett; 7 October 2006 – present	Incumbent
