= Nikolai Valuev vs. John Ruiz II =

Boxing match

- Date: 30 August 2008
- Venue: Max-Schmeling-Halle, Berlin, Germany
- Title(s) on the line: WBA Heavyweight Championship

Tale of the tape
Boxer	(Russia) Nikolai Valuev	(United States) John Ruiz
Nickname	"The Russian Giant"	"The Quietman"
Hometown	Saint Petersburg, Russia	Chelsea, Massachusetts, USA
Pre-fight record	48–1 (1) (34 KO)	43–7–1 (1) (29 KO)
Age	35 years	36 years, 7 months
Height	7 ft 0 in (213 cm)	6 ft 1 in (185 cm)
Weight	318 lb (144 kg)	239 lb (108 kg)
Style	Orthodox	Orthodox
Recognition	WBA; No. 1 Ranked Heavyweight; The Ring; No. 4 Ranked Heavyweight	WBA; No. 2 Ranked Heavyweight; The Ring; No. 10 Ranked Heavyweight

Result
- Valuev defeated Ruiz via Unanimous Decision

Nikolai Valuev vs. John Ruiz II was a professional boxing match contested on 30 August 2008, for the WBA heavyweight championship.

== Background ==
After suffering his first career defeat at the hands of Ruslan Chagaev, Nikolai Valuev had recorded back to back wins against Jean-François Bergeron and Siarhei Liakhovich, the later of whom in a WBA title eliminator, to become Chagaev's mandatory. The rematch was set for 5 July, however the fight had to be cancelled after Chagaev suffered a complete tear of an Achilles tendon during his final sparring session in preparation for the defense. As a result he WBA elected to make Chagaev "Champion in Recess" due to the injury that and it's the necessary recovery time. They also mandated that Valuev and number two ranked contender John Ruiz meet for the vacated title. Ruiz had also recorded back to back wins following his consecutive defeats against Valuev and Chagaev.

Sauerland Events won the purse bid with an offer of $2,106,401.

Heading into the bout, Valuev was the 5-2 on favourite.

== The fight ==
Valuev kept Ruiz at a distance using his left jab, preventing Ruiz from landing more than one punch at a time. Valuev was deduced a point in the 10th round for pushing Ruiz down. At the end of 12 rounds all three judges scored the bout for Valuev the cards reading 116–113, 116–111 and 114–113 (although the 114–113 was originally announced as for Ruiz due to a confused judge).

== Aftermath ==
Like the first match, the decision was unpopular with the live audience as some booed the outcome. Valuev said after the bout "I was quicker but he did a good job and he didn't let me fight my usual fight. I'd like to box Ruiz again". "I thought I won the fight," Ruiz said. "I don't know what was going with the scorecards."

After petitioning the WBA to protest against the outcome, Ruiz was made the WBA's mandatory challenger to fight the winner of Chagaev-Valuev II set for 30 June 2009. As that bout was cancelled following Chagaev failing a Finnish medical test, Ruiz stepped aside as mandatory challenger so Valuev could fight former unified Cruiserweight Champion David Haye.

== Undercard ==
Confirmed bouts:

== Broadcasting ==
Country	Broadcaster
Czech Republic	Sport 1
Germany	ARD
Hungary	Sport 2
Mexico	Televisa
Poland	Polsat Sport
United Kingdom	Nuts TV

Preceded by vs. Siarhei Liakhovich	Nikolai Valuev's bouts 30 August 2008	Succeeded by vs. Evander Holyfield
Preceded by vs. Jameel McCline	John Ruiz's bouts 30 August 2008	Succeeded by vs. Adnan Serin
