= Jean-François Bergeron =

Jean-François Bergeron may refer to:

- Jean-François Bergeron (boxer) (born 1973), former boxer from Canada
- Jean-François Bergeron (film editor), Canadian film editor
- Jean-François Bergeron (alias Djief), Canadian comics artist
