= Nikolai Valuev vs. Ruslan Chagaev =

Boxing competition

- Date: 14 April 2007
- Venue: Porsche-Arena, Stuttgart, Germany
- Title on the line: WBA Heavyweight Championship

Tale of the tape
Boxer	(Russia) Nikolai Valuev	(Uzbekistan) Ruslan Chagaev
Nickname	"The Russian Giant"	"White Tyson"
Hometown	Saint Petersburg, Russia	Andijan, Uzbekistan
Pre-fight record	46–0 (1) (34 KO)	23–0–1 (17 KO)
Age	33 years, 7 months	28 years, 5 months
Height	7 ft 0 in (213 cm)	6 ft 1 in (185 cm)
Weight	319 lb (145 kg)	228 1/4 lb (104 kg)
Style	Orthodox	Southpaw
Recognition	WBA; Heavyweight Champion; The Ring; No. 4 Ranked Heavyweight	WBA; No. 1 Ranked Heavyweight; The Ring; No. 9 Ranked Heavyweight

Result
- Chagaev defeated Valuev via Majority Decision

Nikolai Valuev vs. Ruslan Chagaev was a professional boxing match contested on 14 April 2007, for the WBA heavyweight championship.

== Background ==
After his controversial victory over John Ruiz in December 2005, WBA heavyweight champion Nikolai Valuev had made 3 successful defences, all by stoppage, and had expressed interest in fighting the then-IBF world heavyweight champion Wladimir Klitschko.

Ruslan Chagaev had become Valuev's mandatory challenger following his split decision victory over former champion Ruiz in November 2006. Valuev was sat ringside and believed Chagaev was the rightful winner.

During his training camp ahead of bout, Chagaev's trainer Michael Timm had a special podium built, on which he stood up so Chagaev could get used to punching up to someone with a big height advantage. Most of his sparring partners, such as Julius Long, were between 2.00 metres (6.56 ft) and 2.16 metres (7.1 ft) tall. Timm also had a Panasonic TV with a 2.5 m diagonal installed so they could study Valuev's style in full size.

Valuev entered the ring as a 5 to 1 favourite.

== The fight ==
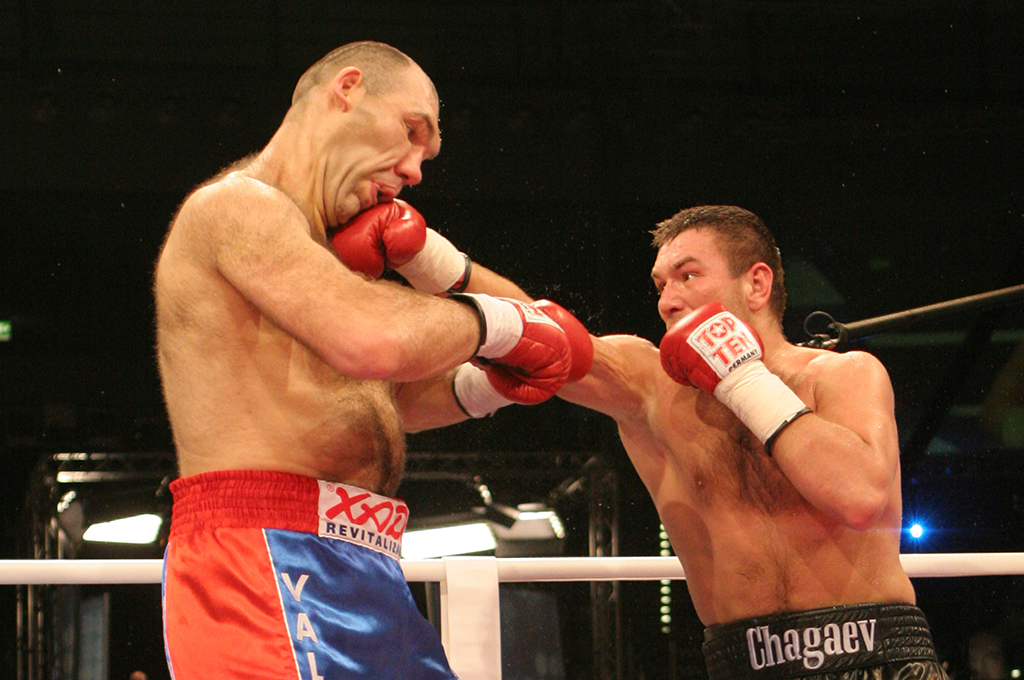
Chagaev landing against Valuev

Chagaev used his speed and footwork to nullify Valuev's size advantage, successfully bobbing and weaving, slipping under Valuev's jab and going back-and-forth between moving to the left and right to confuse Valuev with movement.

After 12 rounds Chagaev won the fight by a majority decision with scores of 117–111, 115–113 and 114–114.

== Aftermath ==
Speaking after the bout Chagaev said "Before the fight everybody said that Nikolai is too tall for me to have a chance. Well, I'm smaller but I have the sting." Shortly afterwards Chagaev signed to face WBO champion Sultan Ibragimov in a unification showdown that would take place in Moscow in October 2007. However, on 31 July, it was officially announced that the fight had been cancelled due to Chagaev suffering from an aggravation of gastric problems. Instead, former undisputed heavyweight champion Evander Holyfield agreed to step in as a last-minute replacement. It was later discovered that Chagaev had contracted hepatitis B.

== Undercard ==
Confirmed bouts:

== Broadcasting ==
Country	Broadcaster
Germany	Das Erste
Hungary	Sport 1
Mexico	Televisa
United Kingdom	British Eurosport
United States	MSG

Preceded by vs. Jameel McCline	Nikolai Valuev's bouts 14 April 2007	Succeeded by vs. Jean-François Bergeron
Preceded by vs. John Ruiz	Ruslan Chagaev's bouts 14 April 2007	Succeeded by vs. Matt Skelton
