= Richel Hersisia =

Dutch boxer

Personal information
- Nationality: Dutch
- Born: April 28, 1974 (age 52) Curaçao, Netherlands Antilles
- Weight: Heavyweight

Boxing career
- Stance: Orthodox

Boxing record
- Total fights: 35
- Wins: 32
- Win by KO: 25
- Losses: 3
- Draws: 0
- No contests: 0

Richel Hersisia (born April 28, 1974) is a Dutch former professional boxer who competed from 2001 to 2009. He is referred to as "The Dutch Sonny Liston" by his fans.

He once held the fringe World Boxing Foundation (WBFo) Heavyweight title, but lost it to Audley Harrison via fourth-round knockout on March 20, 2004 at Wembley Arena in London.

He last fought in September 2008, when he lost a six rounds decision to a returning Ray Mercer in Karlstad, Sweden.

== Professional boxing record ==
32 Wins (25 knockouts, 7 decisions), 3 Losses (1 knockout, 2 decisions)
Result	Record	Opponent	Type	Round	Date	Location	Notes
Win	32–3	(Germany) Frank Kary Roth	TKO	2	14/11/2009	The Hague, Netherlands	
Win	31–3	(Ukraine) Yaroslav Zavorotnyi	UD	8	26/10/2009	Amsterdam, Netherlands	
Loss	30–3	(United States) Ray Mercer	MD	6	05/09/2008	Karlstad, Sweden	
Win	30–2	(Brazil) Marcos Celestino	TKO	1	29/09/2007	Soumagne, Liège, Belgium	Won WBF Intercontinental heavyweight title.
Loss	29–2	(Ukraine) Taras Bydenko	UD	12	30/06/2007	Stuttgart, Germany	For WBA Inter-Continental heavyweight title.
Win	29–1	(Georgia (country)) Zurab Noniashvili	RTD	5	17/03/2007	Stuttgart, Germany	
Win	28–1	(Brazil) Adenilson Rodrigues	KO	2	28/10/2006	Stuttgart, Germany	Rodrigues knocked out at 0:50 of the second round.
Win	27–1	(Brazil) Rogerio Lobo	UD	6	14/01/2006	Aschersleben, Germany	
Win	26–1	(Romania) Ioan Mihai	KO	2	14/10/2005	Struer, Denmark	Mihai knocked out at 1:50 of the second round.
Win	25–1	(Belgium) Vitali Shkraba	KO	6	10/09/2005	Rotterdam, Netherlands	
Win	24–1	(Slovakia) Vlado Szabo	KO	4	09/06/2005	Alcobendas, Madrid, Spain	
Win	23–1	(Belgium) Siarhei Dychkou	TKO	8	06/11/2004	Amsterdam, Netherlands	Won vacant BeNeLux heavyweight title.
Win	22–1	(Hungary) Viktor Juhasz	KO	1	16/10/2004	Halle an der Saale, Germany	Juhasz knocked out at 1:23 of the first round.
Loss	21–1	(United Kingdom) Audley Harrison	KO	4	20/03/2004	(United Kingdom) Wembley Arena, London, England	Lost WBF heavyweight title. Hersisia knocked out at 2:00 of the fourth round.
Win	21–0	(Hungary) Zoltan Petranyi	TKO	1	11/10/2003	(Netherlands Antilles) Willemstad, Curacao	Won Netherlands Kingdom heavyweight title.
Win	20–0	(Finland) Sami Elovaara	UD	12	09/08/2003	Salzburg, Austria	Retained WBF heavyweight title.
Win	19–0	(Argentina) Sandro Abel Vazquez	KO	9	16/05/2003	The Hague, Netherlands	Won vacant WBF heavyweight title.
Win	18–0	(Poland) Wojciech Bartnik	MD	8	15/03/2003	Berlin, Germany	
Win	17–0	(Romania) Costel Patriche	TKO	2	14/02/2003	Leeuwarden, Netherlands	Won vacant Dutch heavyweight title.
Win	16–0	(Argentina) Eduardo Andres Sandivares	TKO	2	30/11/2002	(Netherlands Antilles) Willemstad, Curacao	Won vacant WBA Fedecentro heavyweight title.
Win	15–0	(Kenya) Chris Sirengo	KO	3	11/10/2002	Thisted, Denmark	
Win	14–0	(France) Antoine Palatis	UD	8	23/08/2002	Skagen, Denmark	
Win	13–0	(France) Jean Francis Traore	PTS	6	20/05/2002	Roeselare, Belgium	
Win	12–0	(Burkina Faso) Roger Foe	KO	3	02/05/2002	Arnhem, Netherlands	
Win	11–0	(Hungary) Istvan Kecskes	TKO	4	01/04/2002	Ghent, Belgium	
Win	10–0	(Brazil) Marcelo Ferreira dos Santos	KO	4	01/03/2002	Give, Denmark	
Win	9–0	(Nigeria) Emmanuel Nwodo	TKO	3	18/01/2002	Thisted, Denmark	
Win	8–0	(France) Thierry Guezouli	TKO	3	09/11/2001	Odense, Denmark	
Win	7–0	(Romania) Cătălin Zmărăndescu	TKO	5	12/10/2001	Herning, Denmark	
Win	6–0	(Poland) Piotr Jurczyk	PTS	6	07/07/2001	Amsterdam, Netherlands	
Win	5–0	(Croatia) Drazen Ordulj	KO	3	09/06/2001	Kolobrzeg, Poland	
Win	4–0	(Czech Republic) Frantisek Vasak	TKO	2	19/05/2001	Cologne, Germany	
Win	3–0	(Croatia) Boris Mamic	TKO	3	20/04/2001	Ronne, Denmark	
Win	2–0	(Hungary) Sandor Bacsko	KO	1	16/03/2001	Lemvig, Denmark	
Win	1–0	(Hungary) Laszlo Pataki	TKO	1	25/02/2001	Wassenaar, Netherlands	
