= Owen Beck (boxer) =

Jamaican boxer (born 1976)

Owen LeFranc Beck
Personal information
- Nickname: What the Heck
- Born: Owen LeFranc Beck; 31 May 1976 (age 50) Negril, Jamaica
- Height: 1.85 m (6 ft 1 in)
- Weight: Heavyweight

Boxing career
- Reach: 198.1 cm (78 in)
- Stance: Orthodox

Boxing record
- Total fights: 42
- Wins: 29
- Win by KO: 20
- Losses: 13
- Draws: 0

Owen LeFranc Beck (born 31 May 1976) is a Jamaican former professional boxer who competed between 1998 and 2026. He challenged once for the WBA heavyweight title in 2006.

== Amateur career ==
He had an amateur record of 73 wins and 5 losses.

== Professional career ==
Known as Owen "What the Heck" Beck, Beck began his career in 1998 by winning his first 24 fights, but all against limited opposition, the best being amateur star Derrell Dixon and undefeated Taurus Sykes.

This streak and a contract with Don King set up a WBC & IBF Heavyweight Title Eliminator bout against heavyweight contender Monte Barrett in 2005, where Beck lost by technical knockout in the third round.

After his first defeat, Beck again lost to Ray Austin, but beat cruiserweight Darnell Wilson to set up a shot against the former WBA Heavyweight Title holder Nikolai Valuev. Valuev defeated Beck, dropping him twice and winning via TKO in the 3rd. After he fought Valuev he made a comeback and won the fight against Ricardo Arce via 2nd-round technical knockout and had another fight against Marvin Hunt and beat him via first-round knockout.

He took a 19-month break from boxing before returning to the ring in June 2009.

He fought Andrew Greeley and won the match by split decision on 13 June 2009.

He fought Jermell Barnes on 21 August 2009 in a fight which he won by unanimous decision with the scores of 79–73, 77–75 and 80–72 all in favor of Beck. Also in late 2009 Owen enlisted a new trainer Clinton Barnes.

On 16 January 2010, Beck fought Mahmoud Charr and lost by technical knockout in the tenth and final round with 16 seconds left on the clock.

On 16 April, Beck fought Tony Thompson in Memphis, Tennessee, and was knocked out at 2-minutes and 50-seconds of the 4th round.

== Professional boxing record ==
42 fights	29 wins	13 losses
By knockout	20	10
By decision	8	3
By disqualification	1	0

No.	Result	Record	Opponent	Type	Round, time	Date	Location	Notes
42	Loss	29–13	Ignacio Esparza	MD	10	29 Oct 2016	Arena Coliseo, Guadalajara	
41	Loss	29–12	Oleg Maskaev	TKO	3 (10), 2:59	30 Dec 2012	Sports Palace Quant, Moscow	
40	Loss	29–11	Deontay Wilder	RTD	3 (8), 3:00	23 Jun 2012	Killer Buzz Arena, Tuscaloosa, Alabama	
39	Loss	29–10	Sergey Rozhnov	UD	4	8 Feb 2012	Krylia Sovetov, Moscow	
38	Loss	29–9	Artur Szpilka	RTD	4 (6)	15 Oct 2011	Spodek, Katowice	
37	Loss	29–8	David Rodriguez	KO	3 (10), 2:02	24 May 2011	Don Haskins Convention Center, El Paso, Texas	For vacant WBC FECOMBOX heavyweight title.
36	Loss	29–7	Cedric Boswell	KO	9 (10), 2:29	7 Dec 2010	Seminole Hard Rock Hotel and Casino, Hollywood, Florida	For WBC Latino Heavyweight title.
35	Loss	29–6	Alex Leapai	TKO	6 (10), 2:50	12 Aug 2010	Southport RSL Club, Southport	
34	Loss	29–5	Tony Thompson	TKO	4 (10), 2:50	16 Apr 2010	The New Daisy Theatre, Memphis, Tennessee	
33	Loss	29–4	Mahmoud Charr	TKO	10 (10), 2:44	9 Jan 2010	Bordelandhalle, Magdeburg	
32	Win	29–3	Jermell Barnes	UD	8	21 Aug 2009	Horseshoe Casino, Hammond, Indiana	
31	Win	28–3	Andrew Greeley	SD	8	13 Jun 2009	Royal Oak Music Theatre, Royal Oak, Michigan	
30	Win	27–3	Marvin Hunt	TKO	1 (6), 2:27	8 Nov 2007	San Jose Fiesta, Nashville, Tennessee	
29	Win	26–3	Ricardo Arce	TKO	2 (10), 1:40	28 Sep 2007	Coliseo Olimpico de la UG, Guadalajara	
28	Loss	25–3	Nikolai Valuev	TKO	3 (12), 2:44	3 Jun 2006	TUI Arena, Hanover	For WBA heavyweight title
27	Win	25–2	Darnell Wilson	UD	8	7 Jan 2006	Madison Square Garden, New York City, New York	
26	Loss	24–2	Ray Austin	SD	12	3 Sep 2005	Gund Arena, Cleveland, Ohio	For vacant WBC–USNBC heavyweight title
25	Loss	24–1	Monte Barrett	TKO	9 (12), 2:52	5 Feb 2005	Savvis Center, St. Louis, Missouri	
24	Win	24–0	Troy Weida	TKO	1 (10), 2:39	4 Sep 2004	Mandalay Bay Events Center, Las Vegas, Nevada	
23	Win	23–0	Vernon Woodward	TKO	2 (8)	18 Jun 2004	Blackham Coliseum, Lafayette, Louisiana	
22	Win	22–0	Byron Polley	TKO	1 (8), 2:43	15 May 2004	Mandalay Bay Events Center, Las Vegas, Nevada	
21	Win	21–0	Daniel Frank	TKO	3 (10), 1:04	1 May 2004	Jai Alai Fronton, Miami, Florida	
20	Win	20–0	Scott Conner	DQ	2 (8), 2:57	15 Apr 2004	Airport Convention Center, San Antonio, Texas	
19	Win	19–0	George Arias	UD	12	20 Sep 2003	Uncasville, Connecticut	Won vacant WBA Fedelatin Heavyweight title
18	Win	18–0	Mike Middleton	TKO	1 (10)	4 Jan 2003	D.C. Armory, Washington, D.C.	
17	Win	17–0	Craig Tomlinson	TKO	5 (10), 2:20	14 Dec 2002	Boardwalk Hall, Atlantic City, New Jersey	
16	Win	16–0	Rogério Lobo	TKO	4 (8), 1:26	27 Jun 2002	Mandalay Bay Events Center, Las Vegas, Nevada	
15	Win	15–0	Chavez Francisco	KO	1 (8), 2:28	30 Mar 2002	Sovereign Center, Reading, Pennsylvania	
14	Win	14–0	Franklin Edmondson	TKO	5	25 Oct 2001	South Carolina	
13	Win	13–0	Roy Bedwell	KO	2	9 Sep 2001	Fairgrounds Arena, Nashville, Tennessee	
12	Win	12–0	Ron Gullette	TKO	2	28 Jun 2001	The Plex, Charleston, South Carolina	
11	Win	11–0	Sean Williams	TKO	2	24 May 2001	The Plex, Charleston, South Carolina	
10	Win	10–0	Ramon Hayes	TKO	2	12 Apr 2001	Gaillard Municipal Auditorium, Charleston, South Carolina	
9	Win	9–0	David Smith	TKO	2	10 Mar 2001	Virginia	
8	Win	8–0	Ken Williams	TKO	2	17 Feb 2001	Radisson Hotel, Charleston, South Carolina	
7	Win	7–0	Taurus Sykes	UD	6	7 Oct 2000	Mohegan Sun, Uncasville, Connecticut	
6	Win	6–0	Rocky Bentley	TKO	5	14 Sep 2000	Nashville, Tennessee	
5	Win	5–0	James Holly	TKO	2	26 Aug 2000	Gallatin, Tennessee	
4	Win	4–0	Derrell Dixon	UD	4	25 May 2000	Grand Casino, Tunica, Mississippi	
3	Win	3–0	Lee Swaby	PTS	4	11 Dec 1999	Everton Park Sports Centre, Liverpool	
2	Win	2–0	Luke Simpkin	PTS	4	7 Aug 1999	Goresbrook Leisure Centre, Dagenham	
1	Win	1–0	Max Key	TKO	1	12 Dec 1998	Atlanta, Georgia	

Vacant Title last held by Fres Oquendo	WBA Fedelatin heavyweight champion 20 September 2003 – 2003; Vacated	Vacant Title next held by Taras Bidenko
