= John Ruiz =

American boxer

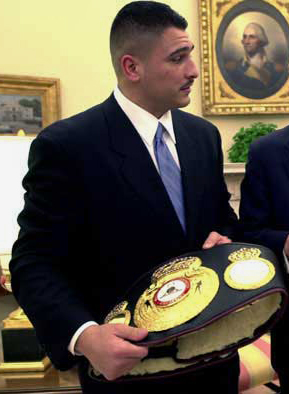
- Ruiz with the WBA heavyweight title belt at the White House, 2001

Personal information
- Nickname: The Quietman
- Born: January 4, 1972 (age 54) Chelsea, Massachusetts, U.S.
- Height: 6 ft 2 in (188 cm)
- Weight: Heavyweight

Boxing career
- Reach: 80 in (203 cm)
- Stance: Orthodox

Boxing record
- Total fights: 55
- Wins: 44
- Win by KO: 30
- Losses: 9
- Draws: 1
- No contests: 1

John Ruiz (born January 4, 1972) is an American former professional boxer who competed from 1992 to 2010, and held the WBA heavyweight world title twice between 2001 and 2005. Ruiz is of Puerto Rican descent, and is the first Latino boxer to win a world heavyweight title.

== Amateur career ==
- 1991: Competed as a light heavyweight at the World Championships in Sydney, Australia. Results were:
  - Defeated Mohamed Benguesmia (Algeria) PTS (22–11)
  - Defeated Miodrag Radulovic (Yugoslavia) RSC-3
  - Lost to Andrey Kurnyavka (Soviet Union) PTS (14–20)
- 1992: Competed at the Olympic Trials in Worcester. Result was:
  - Lost to Jeremy Williams PTS

== Professional career ==
=== First reign as WBA heavyweight champion ===
After Lennox Lewis defeated Evander Holyfield for the undisputed (WBA, WBC, and IBF) heavyweight title in late 1999, the WBA ordered Lewis to defend the title against mandatory challenger Ruiz, but Lewis refused. Though he had been undefeated since his 1st round 19 second loss against David Tua in 1996, the level of competition Ruiz had been facing was suspect and the only name he had beaten (to date) was a nearly 40-year-old Tony Tucker.

Ruiz and his management sued, claiming that WBA rules entitled him to a title shot. A judge agreed, but rather than face Ruiz in a bout that was seen as commercially unattractive, Lewis instead fought Michael Grant, considered to be a very worthy contender at the time, having knocked out a series of recognized "name" opponents on HBO. After learning of this, the judge decreed that upon entering the ring against Grant on April 29, 2000, Lewis would automatically forfeit the WBA title.

=== Ruiz vs. Holyfield ===
Ruiz fought former champion Holyfield to fill the vacancy on August 12, 2000, losing by unanimous decision (this result made Holyfield the first to win a world heavyweight title on four occasions). Many observers and boxing reporters felt that the underdog Ruiz had done enough to win.

Due to this controversial decision, the WBA ordered an immediate rematch in early 2001, and Ruiz won the WBA title. Some critics still believe the decision was controversial (Ruiz was on the ground for a few minutes after Holyfield appeared to deliver a low punch to the groin). Footage following the match showed that the punch may have been legal, but it wasn't disputed.

Ruiz defended the title twice: a controversial draw in a third match against Holyfield where the press believed Holyfield to have won, and a disqualification victory against Kirk Johnson where the Canadian contender was disqualified for repeated low blows in the tenth round. Ruiz was accused in both the second Holyfield fight and the Johnson fight of faking low blows that actually seemed to be closer to his beltline than his groin (although Johnson was shown on replays to hit Ruiz below the belt several times).

=== Ruiz vs Jones Jr. ===
On March 1, 2003, Ruiz was contracted to fight Roy Jones Jr., who at the time was The Ring light heavyweight champion. If Jones was to beat Ruiz in the fight, he would join Bob Fitzsimmons, Michael Spinks, and Michael Moorer as the only three fighters to win titles at light heavyweight and heavyweight as well as becoming the second fighter (Fitzsimmons being the first) to win titles at both middleweight and heavyweight. Ruiz, who said referee Jay Nady "wouldn't let me fight my fight", lost a unanimous decision to Jones and moved back into the WBA's contender pool.

=== Second reign as WBA heavyweight champion ===
Ruiz, however, would receive another shot before 2003 was out. As champion Jones was required to face the WBA's number one contender, former WBO champion Vitali Klitschko. Neither the Jones nor the Klitschko camps were able to agree to a fight by an imposed deadline, so Jones became a champion-in-recess. Klitschko, however, did not want to fight the #2 contender, former WBC, IBF, and lineal champion Hasim Rahman, for the interim championship. After David Tua, the #3 contender, also turned down the fight against Rahman, Ruiz, the #5 contender and the only one interested in the fight, decided to accept. He fought Rahman on December 13, 2003, and with a unanimous decision victory became the WBA's interim champion. When Jones announced on February 24, 2004, that he would return to competing in the light heavyweight division, the WBA took the interim tag off Ruiz, and he became an official two-time WBA heavyweight champion.

On April 17, 2004, Ruiz fought the first defense of his second world title. He retained it with an eleventh-round technical knockout of Fres Oquendo at Madison Square Garden. This fight was historic in that it was the first time two Hispanics/Latinos faced each other for a version of world heavyweight title.

On November 13 of that same year, Ruiz retained the belt with a controversial unanimous decision over Polish-American Andrew Golota – among other things he suffered two knockdowns and a one-point deduction by referee Randy Neumann. Ruiz vs Golota was the Main event of Don King's Night of Heavyweights card, it did 120,000 Pay-Per-View buys

On April 30, 2005, Ruiz lost the title to James "Lights Out" Toney in Madison Square Garden by unanimous decision, marking the second time that Ruiz had lost to a former middleweight champion. Frustrated by years of criticism from the boxing press and fans, he retired upon his second loss of the WBA title on April 30, 2005 (to James "Lights-Out" Toney).

However, after Toney failed the post-match drug test (for stanozolol, an anabolic steroid), the New York Athletic Commission suspended him from boxing in the United States for 90 days, and fined him $10,000 (U.S.). The WBA banned the aging (then 36 years old) Toney from fighting for its heavyweight title for the next two years. This resulted in Toney's win being changed to a "no contest"—basically, a nullification which also reinstated Ruiz as champion. Ruiz came out of retirement after just ten days of his initial announcement, before it was found out that Toney would be suspended and he would be reinstated as champion. Ruiz then filed a lawsuit against Toney, claiming that he had damaged Ruiz's boxing career (due to Toney's use of illegal steroids before their bout).

=== Controversial loss to Valuev ===
On December 17, 2005, Ruiz lost the WBA Championship in Berlin to 7 ft. tall, 324-lb. Russian Nikolai Valuev. The official outcome was a majority decision (scored 114–116, 113–116, and 114–114), but it was also a controversial one. Ruiz was convinced that his jab/combination-punch technique had given him a clear victory. He demanded that his promoter, Don King, set up an immediate re-match with the now-first-ever Russian world heavyweight champion. Ruiz's long-time manager, Norman Stone, declared that they would also formally petition the WBA: after all, the 10,000 German spectators booed when the decision was announced. Ruiz's camp claimed that the Germans booed because they too felt that the outcome was unjust. Wilfried Sauerland, the manager who rescued Valuev's career from obscurity two years earlier, angrily countered that the fans had booed because Stone's in-ring behavior had agitated them.

In September 2006 Ruiz announced that he would be managed by Sauerland. His former manager Norman Stone retired on December 22, 2005, stating that the decision in the loss to Valuev was the last straw, and he would continue to support Ruiz from retirement.

=== Road back to title contention ===
After the loss Don King announced his intention to still promote Ruiz. King had become aware of Ruiz after his KO win over the former IBF title holder Tony Tucker in 1998. Ruiz followed up the loss to Valuev with a fight against up-and-coming contender Ruslan Chagaev. In a close fight, Chagaev prevailed, taking a split decision with scores of 117–111 and 116–112 for Chagaev, and 115–114 for Ruiz. Chagaev became the mandatory challenger for a shot at Valuev, whom he defeated on April 14, 2007, to claim the WBA heavyweight championship.

=== Another comeback ===
Ruiz faced Otis Tisdale on October 13, 2007, and ended the fight with a TKO victory in the second round as referee Pete Podgorski called a halt to the bout as Tisdale went down for the third time. The bout was scheduled for 10 rounds. On March 8, 2008, Ruiz won a 12-round unanimous decision over Jameel McCline in Mexico.

=== Ruiz vs. Valuev II ===
Valuev defeated Ruiz by unanimous decision on August 30, 2008. Scores were 114–113, 116–113, and 116–111. The result was initially declared a split decision win for Valuev. The 114–113 score by ringside judge Takeshi Shimakawa was announced in favor of Ruiz. Shimakawa alerted WBA officials after that his score was intended for Valuev. One of the scorecards had the names of the fighters in opposite order, resulting in the confusion.

The decision was once again unpopular with the live crowd as some booed the outcome, much like the first match in December 2005.

=== Final world title shot ===
After petitioning the WBA to protest against the outcome of his controversial fight with Valuev, Ruiz was made the WBA's mandatory challenger to fight the winner of Chagaev-Valuev II in 2009. As that bout was cancelled, Ruiz stepped aside as mandatory challenger so Valuev could fight Cruiserweight Champion David Haye. On the undercard to that fight Ruiz stopped Adnan Serin in 7 rounds. Ruiz, coming in at 226 pounds (his lightest since 2001), dominated his overmatched opponent to retain his mandatory challenge to the WBA belt. Valuev later lost a majority decision to David Haye, meaning Ruiz would now fight Haye for the WBA title, after Haye had recovered from a hand injury. When the fight took place on April 3, 2010 at the M.E.N. Arena in Manchester, Ruiz lost to Haye by TKO when his corner threw in the towel in the ninth round after suffering four knockdowns in the previous rounds. Ruiz, whose face was covered in blood, could not stand up to Haye's greater speed and power.

=== Retirement ===
Following his loss to David Haye, Ruiz announced his retirement in 2010 after an 18-year boxing career. He finished with a professional record of 44–9–1–1, with 30 knockouts. In 2013, he opened Quietman Sports Gym in Medford, Massachusetts, offering both boxing and MMA (mixed martial arts) training to all ages. While all ages are welcome, he focuses on providing an alternative for at-risk children and teenagers in the Greater Boston area. He has also indicated that he wants to return to boxing in some capacity as either a manager or trainer at some point. In 2014, boxing.com ranked Ruiz as number 83 on its list of "The 100 Greatest Heavyweights of All Time".

== Professional boxing record ==
55 fights	44 wins	9 losses
By knockout	30	2
By decision	13	7
By disqualification	1	0
Draws	1	
No contests	1	

No.	Result	Record	Opponent	Type	Round, time	Date	Location	Notes
55	Loss	44–9–1 (1)	David Haye	TKO	9 (12), 2:01	Apr 3, 2010	MEN Arena, Manchester, England	For WBA heavyweight title
54	Win	44–8–1 (1)	Adnan Serin	TKO	7 (10)	Nov 7, 2009	Nuremberg Arena, Nuremberg, Germany	
53	Loss	43–8–1 (1)	Nikolai Valuev	UD	12	Aug 30, 2008	Max-Schmeling-Halle, Berlin, Germany	For vacant WBA heavyweight title
52	Win	43–7–1 (1)	Jameel McCline	UD	12	Mar 8, 2008	Plaza de Toros, Cancún, Mexico	
51	Win	42–7–1 (1)	Otis Tisdale	TKO	2 (10), 0:45	Oct 13, 2007	Sears Centre Arena, Hoffman Estates, Illinois, U.S.	
50	Loss	41–7–1 (1)	Ruslan Chagaev	SD	12	Nov 18, 2006	Burg-Wächter Castello, Düsseldorf, Germany	
49	Loss	41–6–1 (1)	Nikolai Valuev	MD	12	Dec 17, 2005	Max-Schmeling-Halle, Berlin, Germany	Lost WBA heavyweight title
48	NC	41–5–1 (1)	James Toney	UD	12	Apr 30, 2005	Madison Square Garden, New York City, New York, U.S.	WBA and IBA heavyweight titles at stake; Originally a UD win for Toney, later ruled an NC after he failed a drug test
47	Win	41–5–1	Andrew Golota	UD	12	Nov 13, 2004	Madison Square Garden, New York City, New York, U.S.	Retained WBA heavyweight title
46	Win	40–5–1	Fres Oquendo	TKO	11 (12), 2:33	Apr 17, 2004	Madison Square Garden, New York City, New York, U.S.	Retained WBA heavyweight title
45	Win	39–5–1	Hasim Rahman	UD	12	Dec 13, 2003	Boardwalk Hall, Atlantic City, New Jersey, U.S.	Won WBA interim heavyweight title
44	Loss	38–5–1	Roy Jones Jr.	UD	12	Mar 1, 2003	Thomas & Mack Center Paradise, Nevada, U.S.	Lost WBA heavyweight title
43	Win	38–4–1	Kirk Johnson	DQ	10 (12), 2:17	Jul 27, 2002	Mandalay Bay Events Center, Paradise, Nevada, U.S.	Retained WBA heavyweight title; Johnson disqualified for repeated low blows
42	Draw	37–4–1	Evander Holyfield	SD	12	Dec 15, 2001	Foxwoods Resort Casino, Ledyard, Connecticut, U.S.	Retained WBA heavyweight title
41	Win	37–4	Evander Holyfield	UD	12	Mar 3, 2001	Mandalay Bay Events Center, Paradise, Nevada, U.S.	Won WBA heavyweight title
40	Loss	36–4	Evander Holyfield	UD	12	Aug 12, 2000	Paris Las Vegas, Paradise, Nevada, U.S.	For vacant WBA heavyweight title
39	Win	36–3	Thomas Williams	TKO	2 (12), 0:50	Dec 11, 1999	Grand Casino, Tunica, Mississippi, U.S.	Retained NABA heavyweight title
38	Win	35–3	Fernely Feliz	TKO	7 (12), 3:00	Jun 12, 1999	Aleppo Shrine Auditorium, Wilmington, Massachusetts, U.S.	Won vacant WBA–NABA heavyweight title
37	Win	34–3	Mario Cawley	TKO	4 (12), 1:09	Mar 13, 1999	Madison Square Garden, New York City, New York, U.S.	Retained WBA–NABA heavyweight title
36	Win	33–3	Jerry Ballard	TKO	4 (12), 2:17	Sep 19, 1998	Georgia Dome, Atlanta, Georgia, U.S.	Retained NABF heavyweight title; Won vacant WBA–NABA heavyweight title
35	Win	32–3	Tony Tucker	TKO	11 (12), 0:58	Jan 31, 1998	Ice Palace, Tampa, Florida, U.S.	Retained NABF heavyweight title
34	Win	31–3	Ray Anis	TKO	1 (12), 0:22	Jun 17, 1997	Casino Magic, Bay St. Louis, Mississippi, U.S.	Retained NABF heavyweight title
33	Win	30–3	Jimmy Thunder	SD	12	Jan 14, 1997	Hale Arena, Kansas City, Missouri, U.S.	Won vacant NABF heavyweight title
32	Win	29–3	Yuriy Yelistratov	TKO	3	Nov 26, 1996	York Hall, London, England	
31	Win	28–3	Nathaniel Fitch	TKO	3 (6)	Oct 25, 1996	The Roxy, Boston, Massachusetts, U.S.	
30	Win	27–3	Greg Pickrom	TKO	1 (10)	Jul 18, 1996	The Roxy, Boston, Massachusetts, U.S.	
29	Win	26–3	Doug Davis	TKO	6 (10)	Jun 6, 1996	The Roxy, Boston, Massachusetts, U.S.	
28	Loss	25–3	David Tua	KO	1 (12), 0:19	Mar 15, 1996	Convention Hall, Atlantic City, New Jersey, U.S.	Lost WBC International heavyweight title
27	Win	25–2	Steve Pannell	TKO	4 (10), 1:28	Oct 7, 1995	Convention Hall, Atlantic City, New Jersey, U.S.	
26	Win	24–2	Willie Jackson	KO	1 (10)	Aug 24, 1995	Somerville, Massachusetts, U.S.	
25	Win	23–2	Derrick Roddy	KO	2 (12), 2:56	Jun 16, 1995	Elephant and Castle Leisure Centre, London, England	Won vacant WBC International heavyweight title
24	Win	22–2	Michael Murray	TKO	4 (10)	May 17, 1995	Ipswich, England	
23	Win	21–2	Jack Basting	TKO	1 (8)	Mar 30, 1995	York Hall, London, England	
22	Win	20–2	Boris Powell	UD	10	Feb 4, 1995	Silver Nugget, North Las Vegas, Nevada, U.S.	
21	Win	19–2	Rick Sullivan	KO	2	Oct 1, 1994	The Roxy, Boston, Massachusetts, U.S.	
20	Loss	18–2	Danell Nicholson	SD	12	Aug 4, 1994	Foxwoods Resort Casino, Ledyard, Connecticut, U.S.	For vacant IBO heavyweight title
19	Win	18–1	Muhammad Askai	TKO	2	Jun 25, 1994	Revere, Massachusetts, U.S.	
18	Win	17–1	Julius Francis	KO	4 (8), 2:38	May 25, 1994	Colston Hall, Bristol, England	
17	Win	16–1	Carl Williams	PTS	6	Nov 27, 1993	Masonic Auditorium, Cleveland, Ohio, U.S.	
16	Win	15–1	Cordwell Hylton	PTS	6	Nov 3, 1993	Whitchurch Leisure Centre, Bristol, England	
16	Loss	14–1	Sergei Kobozev	SD	10	Aug 12, 1993	Casino Magic, Bay St. Louis, Mississippi, U.S.	
14	Win	14–0	Exum Speight	UD	8	Jun 25, 1993	Athletic Club, Chelsea, Massachusetts, U.S.	
13	Win	13–0	George Chambers	KO	1	Apr 30, 1993	Chelsea, Massachusetts, U.S.	
12	Win	12–0	Mark Sonnier	TKO	1	Apr 16, 1993	Cyclorama Building, Boston, Massachusetts, U.S.	
11	Win	11–0	Juan Quintana	PTS	6	Apr 3, 1993	Somerville, Massachusetts, U.S.	
10	Win	10–0	Lorenzo Poole	KO	1	Mar 20, 1993	Revere, Massachusetts, U.S.	
9	Win	9–0	Derrick Jones	TKO	1	Mar 5, 1993	Boston, Massachusetts, U.S.	
8	Win	8–0	Phil Prince	KO	1	Feb 20, 1993	Boston, Massachusetts, U.S.	
7	Win	7–0	Miguel Rosa	TKO	2	Jan 30, 1993	Commonwealth Armory, Boston, Massachusetts, U.S.	
6	Win	6–0	John Basil Jackson	PTS	6	Jan 16, 1993	Belmont, New Hampshire, U.S.	
5	Win	5–0	Jesus Rohena	TKO	1, 1:46	Dec 10, 1992	Teachers Union Hall, Boston, Massachusetts, U.S.	
4	Win	4–0	John Basil Jackson	PTS	6	Nov 13, 1992	Revere, Massachusetts, U.S.	
3	Win	3–0	Barry Kirton	TKO	2	Nov 3, 1992	Foxwoods Resort Casino, Ledyard, Connecticut, U.S.	
2	Win	2–0	Mike Vasser	KO	1	Sep 12, 1992	Wonderland Greyhound Park, Revere, Massachusetts, U.S.	
1	Win	1–0	Kevin Parker	UD	4	Aug 20, 1992	Etess Arena, Atlantic City, New Jersey, U.S.	

== See also ==
- List of Puerto Rican boxing world champions

Sporting positions
Regional boxing titles
Vacant Title last held by James Oyebola	WBC International heavyweight champion June 16, 1995 – March 15, 1996	Succeeded by David Tua
Vacant Title last held by Tony Tucker	NABF heavyweight champion January 14, 1997 – January 1999; Vacated	Vacant Title next held by Michael Grant
Vacant Title last held by Francois Botha	WBA–NABA heavyweight champion September 19, 1998 – May 1999; Vacated	Vacant Title next held by Derrick Jefferson
Vacant Title last held by Derrick Jefferson	WBA–NABA heavyweight champion June 12, 1999 – August 12, 2000; Failed to win world title	Vacant Title next held by Nate Jones
World boxing titles
Preceded by Evander Holyfield	WBA heavyweight champion March 3, 2001 – March 1, 2003	Succeeded by Roy Jones Jr.
New title	WBA heavyweight champion Interim title December 13, 2003 – February 24, 2004; Promoted	Vacant Title next held by Luis Ortiz
Preceded by Roy Jones Jr. as champion in recess	WBA heavyweight champion February 24, 2004 – December 17, 2005	Succeeded by Nikolai Valuev
