= Andreas Sidon =

German boxer

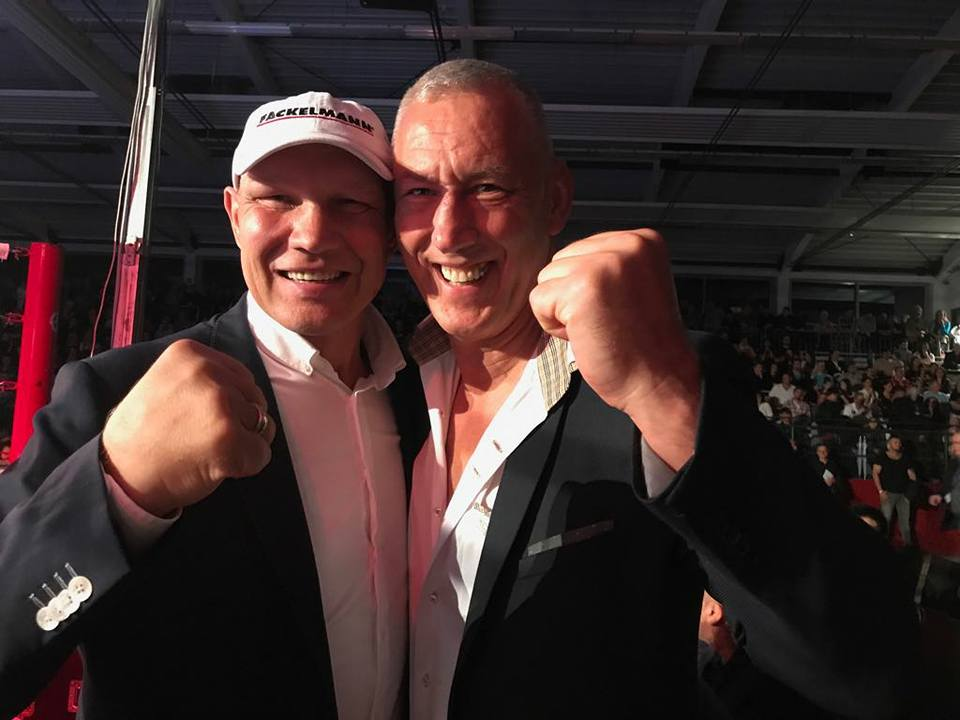
- Andreas Sidon with Axel Schulz

Personal information
- Nationality: German
- Born: 4 February 1963 (age 63) Wuppertal, Germany
- Weight: Heavyweight

Boxing career
- Stance: Orthodox

Boxing record
- Total fights: 57
- Wins: 45
- Win by KO: 36
- Losses: 11
- No contests: 1

Andreas Sidon (born 4 February 1963) is a German professional boxer. A professional since 1999, he has faced former world champions and contenders Nikolay Valuev, Odlanier Solis, Danny Williams, and Andrzej Wawrzyk.

== Debut ==
Sidon turned professional in March 1999 in the Buergerzentrum Chorweiler, Cologne, Germany. In his debut Sidon stopped Zoltan Nagymihaly in the second round of a four-round contest.

== German title ==
Sidon faced Nikolay Valuev in only his second fight. Sidon suffered two standing eight-counts in the first round. Valuev also dominated the second round. The referee wanted to stop the fight in the third round, although there seemed to be no reason for a stoppage at that moment. The crowd was very discontented with the ref's decision and beercups and bottles were thrown into the ring. Sidon wanted to continue, so he persuaded Valuev to continue fighting for the full 6 rounds.

Due to fighting without a referee (who left the ring in the third round), the EBU ruled the bout as a no-contest. Sidon later told, that it was the referee's first professional bout and that Valuev's people shouted to the referee, that he should stop the fight, otherwise Valuev might hurt Sidon. Sidon also said, that the timekeeper shortened the later rounds, due to Valuev having conditioning problems.

== WBU V. Heavyweight title ==
Sidon became the World Boxing Union V. heavyweight Champion on May 26, 2012, by defeating Henadzi Daniliuk in the Stadthalle, Ransbach-Baumbach, Germany.
