= Rogério Lobo (boxer) =

Brazilian boxer (1971–2006)

Personal information
- Born: Rogério Lobo; January 26, 1971 São Paulo, Brazil
- Died: July 28, 2006 (aged 35)
- Height: 1.83 m (6 ft 0 in)
- Weight: Heavyweight

Boxing career
- Stance: Orthodox

Boxing record
- Total fights: 57
- Wins: 40
- Win by KO: 34
- Losses: 17
- Draws: 0
- No contests: 0

Rogério Lobo (January 26, 1971 – July 28, 2006) was a Brazilian former professional boxer who competed from 1995 to 2006.

== Professional career ==
Born in São Paulo, Brazil, Lobo turned professional in 1995 and was known as a journeyman fighter in Brazil before getting a couple of main event fights in the United States and even Italy and Fiji. Although he never defeated a notable foe, he suffered losses to contenders Vincenzo Cantatore, Owen Beck, Jean François Bergeron, Timor Ibragimov, Mike Mollo and Kali Meehan. His final fight was a KO win via a right hook in late 2006.

== Death ==
Lobo was killed just two days after his last fight, during an armed robbery in a restaurant he owned in São Paulo. Lobo bought the establishment with the money he received after his two fights in Las Vegas in 2003. Rogério was shot multiple times in the chest and arms by assailants. He died hours later after going into cardiac arrest at a local hospital in São Paulo. He left behind his wife Ana Lobo and an 18-month-old son. After his death, the promotion he last fought for in his native Brazil held a memorial event in his memory and to raise money for his wife and son.

== Professional boxing record ==
40 Wins (34 knockouts, 6 decisions), 17 Losses (13 knockouts, 4 decisions)
| Result | Record | Opponent | Type | Round | Date | Location | Notes |
| Win | 1-1 | (Brazil) Adilson Noli | KO | 1 | 26/07/2006 | São Paulo, Brazil | Noli knocked out at 1:50 of the first round. |
| Loss | 12-1 | (Canada) David Cadieux | RTD | 4 | 23/06/2006 | Montreal, Canada | Lobo did not come out for the fourth round. |
| Win | 1-11 | (Brazil) Richard Da Gloria | TKO | 3 | 30/05/2006 | São Paulo, Brazil | Da Gloria knocked out at 1:30 of the third round. |
| Loss | 30-3 | (Australia) Kali Meehan | KO | 3 | 31/03/2006 | Suva, Fiji | PABA Heavyweight Title. |
| Win | 0-7-1 | (Brazil) Ruy Da Gloria | KO | 2 | 23/02/2006 | São Paulo, Brazil | Da Gloria knocked out at 2:20 of the second round. |
| Loss | 26-1 | (Netherlands) Richel "The Dutch Sonny Liston" Hersisia | UD | 6 | 14/01/2006 | Aschersleben, Germany | |
| Win | 0-16 | (Brazil) Marival Sobral Sobrinho | DQ | 2 | 10/12/2005 | São Paulo, Brazil | Referee disqualified Sobrinho at 2:00 of the second round for kicking. |
| Loss | 14-0 | (United States) Mike Mollo | KO | 6 | 04/11/2005 | Cicero, Illinois, United States | IBF/WBO/WBC Latino Heavyweight Titles. Lobo knocked out at 2:48 of the sixth round. |
| Win | 6-5 | (Brazil) Albertino Mota Pinheiro | RTD | 2 | 01/10/2005 | São Paulo, Brazil | FNBPB Brazilian Cruiserweight Title. |
| Win | 1-1-1 | (Brazil) Jose Carlos Da Silva | TKO | 3 | 18/09/2005 | São Paulo, Brazil | Referee stopped the bout at 2:34 of the third round. |
| Loss | 18-0-1 | (Uzbekistan) Timur Ibragimov | KO | 4 | 24/06/2005 | Las Vegas, United States | Lobo knocked out at 0:51 of the fourth round. |
| Win | 3-13 | (Brazil) Aurelio Dos Santos | KO | 1 | 12/06/2005 | São Paulo, Brazil | Dos Santos knocked out at 2:45 of the first round. |
| Loss | 13-0 | (Argentina) Mauro Adrian "El Atleta" Ordiales | KO | 2 | 19/03/2005 | Buenos Aires, Argentina | Lobo knocked out at 2:10 of the second round. |
| Loss | 27-2-2 | (Italy) Vincenzo Rossitto | TKO | 3 | 02/10/2004 | Toscana, Italy | |
| Win | 0-4 | (Brazil) Reinaldo Fidelis | KO | 3 | 01/05/2004 | São Paulo, Brazil | |
| Win | 0-3 | (Brazil) Luis Americo Kihara | TKO | 3 | 26/04/2004 | Brazil | |
| Loss | 18-0 | (Canada) Jean Francois Bergeron | KO | 2 | 20/03/2004 | Montreal, Canada | Lobo knocked out at 2:20 of the second round. |
| Loss | 12-0 | (Brazil) Daniel Bispo | UD | 10 | 24/01/2004 | São Paulo, Brazil | CBBP Brazilian Cruiserweight Title. 95-98, 94-96, 94-96. |
| Win | 0-2 | (Brazil) Luis Americo Kihara | TKO | 5 | 21/12/2003 | São Paulo, Brazil | |
| Loss | 44-3-1 | (United States) Michael "Double M" Moorer | KO | 1 | 23/08/2003 | Coconut Creek, Florida, United States | Lobo knocked out at 1:04 of the first round. |
| Win | 1-7 | (Brazil) Richard Da Gloria | KO | 1 | 06/07/2003 | São Paulo, Brazil | |
| Loss | 18-1-1 | (United States) Kelvin "Concrete" Davis | TKO | 1 | 21/02/2003 | Las Vegas, United States | IBA Americas Cruiserweight Title. Referee stopped the bout at 0:42 of the first round. |
| Loss | 15-0 | (Jamaica) Owen Beck | TKO | 4 | 27/07/2002 | Las Vegas, United States | Referee stopped the bout at 1:26 of the fourth round. |
| Win | -- | (Brazil) Josemir Henrique Fernandes | KO | 7 | 21/04/2002 | Brasília, Brazil | |
| Win | 1-5 | (Brazil) Richard Da Gloria | KO | 3 | 23/03/2002 | São Paulo, Brazil | |
| Loss | 20-8 | (Argentina) Pedro Daniel "Ringo" Franco | TKO | 5 | 14/07/2001 | Buenos Aires, Argentina | South American Heavyweight Title. |
| Win | 0-2 | (Brazil) Jonatas Dos Santos | TKO | 4 | 30/06/2001 | São Paulo, Brazil | |
| Win | 17-7-2 | (Brazil) Carlos Barcelete | KO | 3 | 18/05/2001 | São Paulo, Brazil | |
| Win | 22-2 | (Italy) Vincenzo Cantatore | KO | 1 | 26/12/2000 | Rome, Italy | WBC International Cruiserweight Title. |
| Win | 13-10-3 | (United States) Tyrone Armstead | UD | 6 | 22/07/2000 | Miami, United States | |
| Win | 0-3 | (Brazil) Marcos Reginaldo Dos Santos | KO | 1 | 26/07/2006 | São Paulo, Brazil | |
| Win | 2-1 | (Brazil) Eduardo Franca | KO | 2 | 30/05/2000 | São Paulo, Brazil | |
| Win | 1-25 | (Brazil) Lourival Luiz "Cowboy" Da Silva | TKO | 3 | 18/04/2000 | São Paulo, Brazil | |
| Win | 10-30-1 | (Brazil) Jose Laercio Bezerra de Lima | TKO | 4 | 22/02/2000 | Pernambuco, Brazil | |
| Win | 2-0 | (Brazil) Eduardo Franca | KO | 1 | 26/08/1999 | São Paulo, Brazil | |
| Win | 0-1-1 | (Brazil) Ronaldo Da Silva Porto | KO | 1 | 17/07/1999 | São Paulo, Brazil | |
| Win | 1-22 | (Brazil) Lourival Luiz Da Silva | TKO | 1 | 29/05/1999 | São Paulo, Brazil | Brazilian Light Heavyweight Title. |
| Win | 18-4-1 | (Brazil) Marco Antonio Duarte | TKO | 5 | 19/12/1998 | Punta del Este, Uruguay | |
| Win | 10-9-2 | (Argentina) Raul Noberto Guichapani | KO | 6 | 17/10/1998 | Punta del Este, Uruguay | |
| Loss | 17-4-1 | (Brazil) Marco Antonio Duarte | SD | 12 | 01/08/1998 | Punta del Este, Uruguay | WBA Fedelatin Light Heavyweight Title. |
| Win | 0-2 | (Brazil) Silvano De Castro | TKO | 1 | 02/06/1998 | São Paulo, Brazil | |
| Win | -- | Nelson Gamarra | KO | 3 | 20/03/1998 | São Paulo, Brazil | |
| Loss | 103-6-2 | (Brazil) Jorge "Locomotora" Castro | KO | 3 | 23/01/1998 | Buenos Aires, Argentina | WBA Fedelatin Super Middleweight Title. |
| Win | -- | (Brazil) Clovis Aparecido Barbosa | KO | 2 | 06/07/1997 | São Paulo, Brazil | |
| Win | 9-0 | (Brazil) Osmar Luiz "Animal" Teixeira | KO | 1 | 21/06/1997 | São Paulo, Brazil | |
| Win | 15-11-5 | (Argentina) Juan Carlos Scaglia | PTS | 12 | 29/04/1997 | São Paulo, Brazil | |
| Loss | 12-0 | (Norway) Thomas Hansvoll | PTS | 6 | 15/11/1996 | Naestved, Denmark | |
| Win | 20-16-1 | (Puerto Rico) Carlos "Cano" Betancourt | KO | 5 | 20/07/1996 | Tampa, Florida, United States | |
| Win | -- | (Brazil) Marcos Reginaldo Dos Santos | KO | 2 | 27/04/1996 | São Paulo, Brazil | |
| Win | 0-1 | (Brazil) Sergio Lopes Nogueira | KO | 3 | 15/11/1995 | Goiás, Brazil | |
| Win | 2-6 | (Brazil) Teobaldo Sergio De Oliveira | TKO | 4 | 18/07/1995 | São Paulo, Brazil | |
| Win | 1-9 | (Brazil) Lourival Luiz "Cowboy" Da Silva | PTS | 8 | 20/06/1995 | São Paulo, Brazil | |
| Win | 5-16 | (United States) Joe Harris | PTS | 8 | 06/06/1995 | Fortaleza, Brazil | |
| Win | 0-5 | (Brazil) Cicero Andrade | KO | 2 | 25/04/1995 | São Paulo, Brazil | |
| Win | 0-1 | (Brazil) Edson "Agulha" Farias | PTS | 6 | 04/04/1995 | Belém, Brazil | |
| Win | 0-1 | (Brazil) Genesio Torres | TKO | 3 | 19/03/1995 | Pernambuco, Brazil | |
| Win | -- | (Brazil) Albertino Mota "Mineiro" Pinheiro | KO | 2 | 26/02/1995 | São Paulo, Brazil | |
