= John Ruiz vs. Nikolai Valuev =

Boxing match

- Date: 17 December 2005
- Venue: Max-Schmeling-Halle, Berlin, Germany
- Title(s) on the line: WBA heavyweight championship

Tale of the tape
Boxer	John Ruiz	Nikolai Valuev
Nickname	The Quietman	The Russian Giant
Hometown	Chelsea, Massachusetts, U.S.	Saint Petersburg, Russia
Pre-fight record	41–5–1 (1) (28 KO)	43–0 (1) (33 KO)
Age	33 years, 11 months	32 years, 3 months
Height	6 ft 2 in (188 cm)	7 ft 0 in (213 cm)
Weight	237 3/4 lb (108 kg)	324 lb (147 kg)
Style	Orthodox	Orthodox
Recognition	WBA; Heavyweight Champion; The Ring; No. 2 Ranked Heavyweight	WBA; No. 1 Ranked Heavyweight

Result
- Valuev wins via majority decision (116–114, 116–113, 114–114)

John Ruiz vs. Nikolai Valuev was a professional boxing match contested on 17 December 2005, for the WBA heavyweight championship.

== Background ==
After reversing his short lived retirement following his defeat at the hands of James Toney was changed to a non contest, John Ruiz agreed in October 2005 to face the undefeated Nikolai Valuev, who had just won a close and disputed title eliminator with Larry Donald.

Bookmakers Stan James had Valuev as the 13–8 on favourite to win.

== The fight ==
Ruiz picked off the Russian easily throughout the fight and cut him below the left eye. However Valuev managed to rock Ruiz with a left in the eighth and edged the final round with right-left combination that wobbled the American.

Two of the three judges scored the bout for Valuev 114–116 and 113–116 while the third scored it 114–114, giving Valuev a Majority Decision victory, becoming the first-ever Russian world heavyweight champion. He also became the tallest and heaviest champion in boxing history. However it was also a controversial one causing 10,000 German spectators booed when the decision was announced.

== Aftermath ==
Ruiz was convinced that his jab/combination-punch technique had given him a clear victory and demanded that his promoter, Don King, set up an immediate re-match. Ruiz's long-time manager, Norman Stone, who had grabbed the belt and yelled insults at the Valuev camp following the decision, declared that they would also formally petition the WBA. Ruiz's camp claimed that the Germans booed because they too felt that the outcome was unjust, with Ruiz telling the post-fight media conference "Only in boxing can you get robbed without a gun". Wilfried Sauerland, the manager who rescued Valuev's career from obscurity two years earlier, angrily countered that the fans had booed because Stone's in-ring behavior had agitated them.

Frank Warren held talks with Don King and Wilfried Sauerland in an attempt to arrange a bout with Commonwealth champion Danny Williams, with Warren saying "It would be a huge fight, it would be a big enough draw to be staged at a London football stadium."

The two would evently have a rematch in August 2008 with Valuev again getting a controversial decision.

== Undercard ==
Confirmed bouts:

== Broadcasting ==
Country	Broadcaster
Germany	Das Erste
Poland	TVP3

Preceded by vs. James Toney	John Ruiz's bouts 17 December 2005	Succeeded by vs. Ruslan Chagaev
Preceded by vs. Larry Donald	Nikolai Valuev's bouts 17 December 2005	Succeeded by vs. Owen Beck
