= PSD Bank Nürnberg Arena =

Multi-use indoor arena in Nuremberg, Germany

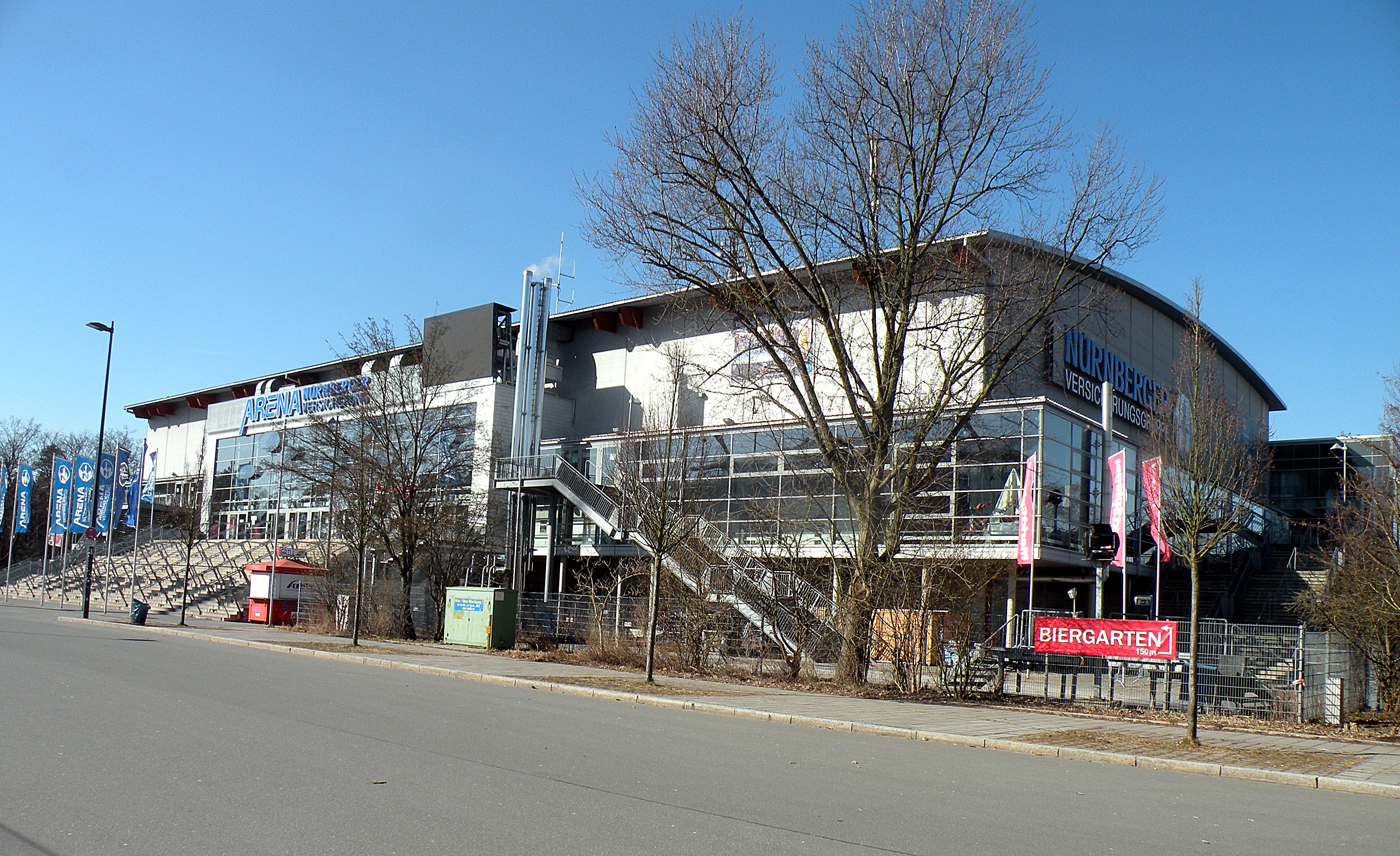
- The arena in 2011
- Interactive map of PSD Bank Nürnberg Arena
- Former names: Arena Nürnberg (2001–2005); Arena Nürnberger Versicherung (2005–2025)
- Location: Nuremberg, Bavaria, Germany
- Coordinates: 49°25′39″N 11°07′23″E
- Owner: Nürnberg Arena 2000 Projektgesellschaft mbH & Co. KG
- Capacity: Rock concerts: 11,000; Classical concerts: 7,500; Boxing: 9,400; Handball: 8,200; Basketball: 8,200; Tennis: 8,200; Ice Hockey: 7,809

Construction
- Groundbreaking: 26 August 1999
- Opened: 15 February 2001
- Renovated: 2011

Tenants
- Nürnberg Ice Tigers (2001–present); HC Erlangen (2014-present); Bamberg Baskets (2005/06, 2015–present) (selected matches)

The PSD Bank Nürnberg Arena (originally known as the Arena Nürnberg) is a multi-use indoor arena that is located in Nuremberg, Germany. It can host sports matches, including those of tennis, ice hockey, handball, and basketball, as well as musical concerts. It has a capacity of up to 9,400 people for sports, and up to 11,000 people for concerts.

== History ==
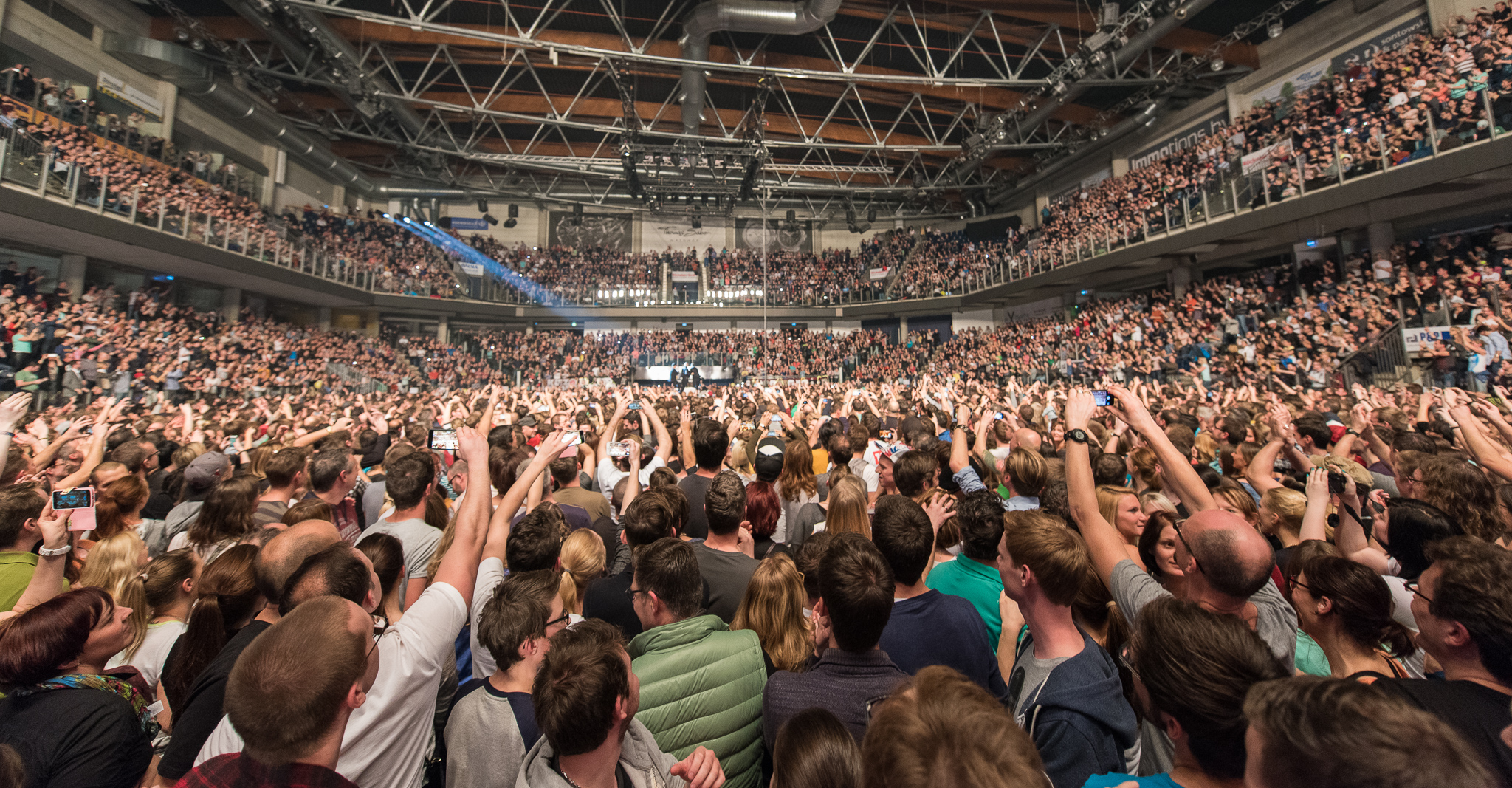
The interior of the arena

The arena opened in 2001 as Arena Nürnberg. On 22 April 2003, Irish vocal pop band Westlife held a concert for their Unbreakable Tour supporting their album Unbreakable - The Greatest Hits Vol. 1. In 2005, it was renamed Arena Nürnberger Versicherung to reflect its sponsorship by local insurance firm Nürnberger Versicherung. On 7 November 2009, David Haye won the WBA Heavyweight Championship, against Nikolai Valuev, at the arena, in his first attempt at the heavyweight title.

The arena is the home venue for the German Ice Hockey League club, Thomas Sabo Ice Tigers Nürnberg, and was also the home arena for the now defunct German League basketball club, Falke Nürnberg.

The German Basketball League club, Brose Bamberg, has also played EuroLeague home games at the arena in the 2005–06 EuroLeague season, against the Greek League club AEK Athens, during the 2015–16 EuroLeague season against the Spanish League club Real Madrid, and during the 2016–17 EuroLeague season against the Turkish Super League club Efes. They also played a home game in the 2017–18 season, against FC Barcelona.

In July 2025 the arena was renamed PSD Bank Nürnberg Arena after the cooperative PSD Bank Nürnberg.

== Equipment ==
The hall has three ice surfaces or alternatively 1,900 m^{2} of event space. Depending on the event, it can hold up to 11,000 visitors with an interior, lower and upper tier. Under the roof of the hall is a video cube with four LED screens (520 × 920 pixels per side), each measuring about 17 m^{2} (69 m^{2} in total). For ice hockey games, the stadium seats a total of 8,130 people in 3,617 standing and 4,513 seats, including 340 in box seats and 548 in business seats. The stadium is also equipped with a video screen.

== Naming ==
Following the example of other arenas, the hall operators signed a sponsorship agreement with Nürnberger Versicherung in February 2005. Since then, the hall has officially borne the name "Arena Nürnberger Versicherung."

== Events ==
The Nürnberg Ice Tigers play their DEL home games in the arena. In 2001, the 2001 Men's Ice Hockey World Championships was held in the arena alongside Cologne and Hanover, as was the IIHF Inline Hockey World Championship in 2002 and 2003. GHP Bamberg moved to the Nürnberg Arena in 2005 and 2006 for its international basketball games, but the arena also hosts competitions in indoor soccer (1. FC Nürnberg Indoor Cup), handball, tennis and boxing. The arena also hosts WWE wrestling events, most recently on 14 November 2008 and 11 November 2010, as well as concert and show events. Among the performing musicians and bands are Robbie Williams, Peter Maffay, Anastacia, Pink, Die Ärzte, Elton John, OneRepublic, Bryan Adams, Udo Jürgens, Bob Dylan and Herbert Grönemeyer. The arena also serves as an auxiliary stage at the rock festival Rock im Park.

In addition, the arena is also used for conferences and exhibitions. During the ice skating season, the surfaces at the Ice Sports Performance Center are regularly open to the public.

In the Pollstar ranking of visitor numbers, the arena was ranked 13th in Germany, 47th in Europe, and 188th in the world in 2018, with 63,184 visitors.

== See also ==
- List of indoor arenas in Germany
