= Jean-François Bergeron (boxer) =

Canadian boxer

Personal information
- Full name: Jean-François Bergeron
- Born: June 26, 1973 (age 53) Saint-Jérôme, Quebec, Canada
- Height: 1.95 m (6 ft 5 in)
- Weight: 100 kg (220 lb)

Sport
- Sport: Boxing
- Weight class: Super Heavyweight
- Club: Club de Boxe St. Jérôme
Medal record
Pan American Games
Silver medal – second place	1995 Mar del Plata	Super Heavyweight

Jean-François Bergeron (born July 26, 1973) is a Canadian former professional boxer. As an amateur, he represented his native country at the 1996 Summer Olympics in Atlanta, Georgia.

== Amateur career ==
He won the Canadian championship five time and won gold in 4 international championships, beating the likes of Paolo Vidoz and Michael Sprott.

Southpaw Bergeron won the silver medal at the 1995 Pan American Games. He competed in Atlanta at the Olympics but was knocked out by Attila Levin.

Bergeron wrapped up his amateur career with a record of 70 wins, 15 defeats.

== Professional career ==
Bergeron fought his first pro bout on April 3, 1998, at age 24. In 2001 he beat undefeated American amateur champ Willie Palms. In 2003 he beat Darroll Wilson (who holds a knockout win over Shannon Briggs). Bergeron was injured at the time and fought only with his right arm from the second round, but still managed to win the fight by a unanimous decision. In 2006 he bested Steve Panell (who had knocked down Wladimir Klitschko when they fought).

== Fight against Valuev ==
Bergeron faced former WBA heavyweight champion Nikolai Valuev on Sept 29th 2007 in Germany. He lost by unanimous decision.

After his fight with Valuev he fought Dominick Guinn losing by second-round knockout on October 24, 2008.

== Professional boxing record ==
27 Wins (19 knockouts, 8 decisions), 2 Losses (1 knockout, 1 decision)
Result	Record	Opponent	Type	Round	Date	Location	Notes
Loss	28-6-1	Dominick Guinn	KO	2	24/10/2008	Montreal, Quebec, Canada	Bergeron knocked out at 2:40 of the second round.
Loss	46-1	Nikolay Valuev	UD	12	29/09/2007	Oldenburg, Germany	NABA Heavyweight Title.
Win	21-8	Robert Hawkins	UD	10	15/06/2007	Montreal, Quebec, Canada	NABA Heavyweight Title.
Win	21-4-3	Chad Van Sickle	TKO	4	26/01/2007	Montreal, Quebec, Canada	Referee stopped the bout at 2:50 of the fourth round.
Win	25-8	Edegar Da Silva	KO	5	15/09/2006	Montreal, Quebec, Canada	interim NABA Heavyweight Title. Silva knocked out at 2:28 of the fifth round.
Win	34-12-2	Andy Sample	TKO	1	02/06/2006	Saint-Jérôme, Quebec, Canada	Referee stopped the bout at 2:21 of the first round.
Win	34-9	Steve Pannell	KO	3	24/03/2006	Montreal, Quebec, Canada	Pannell knocked out at 2:30 of the third round.
Win	14-7	Marcus McGee	UD	8	16/09/2005	Montreal, Quebec, Canada	
Win	15-2-1	Jimmy Joseph	TKO	4	18/03/2005	Montreal, Quebec, Canada	Referee stopped the bout at 2:36 of the fourth round.
Win	18-12	Reynaldo Minus	UD	6	03/12/2004	Montreal, Quebec, Canada	
Win	31-9	Rogerio Lobo	KO	2	20/03/2004	Montreal, Quebec, Canada	Lobo knocked out at 2:20 of the second round.
Win	27-6-2	Darroll Wilson	UD	10	07/03/2003	Niagara Falls, Ontario, Canada	
Win	17-9	Brian Nix	TKO	5	17/11/2002	Grand Forks, North Dakota, U.S.	
Win	22-8	Mario Cawley	KO	4	06/09/2002	Montreal, Quebec, Canada	Cawley knocked out at 0:36 of the fourth round.
Win	11-1-1	Derrick Brown	RTD	7	31/05/2002	Bucharest, Romania	
Win	24-12-1	Marcellus Brown	TKO	3	21/04/2002	Laughlin, Nevada, U.S.	Referee stopped the bout at 0:28 of the third round.
Win	16-16	Jason Nicholson	UD	6	18/01/2002	Las Vegas, Nevada, U.S.	
Win	10-5	Curt Paige	TKO	2	30/11/2001	Montreal, Quebec, Canada	Referee stopped the bout at 0:50 of the second round.
Win	9-0	Willie Palms	UD	6	28/09/2001	Las Vegas, Nevada, U.S.	
Win	10-10	Art Card	TKO	2	10/07/2001	Montreal, Quebec, Canada	Referee stopped the bout at 0:37 of the second round.
Win	8-8-1	Sean Williams	TKO	3	02/03/2001	Montreal, Quebec, Canada	Referee stopped the bout at 2:32 of the third round.
Win	3-6	Ben Perlini	KO	2	15/12/2000	Montreal, Quebec, Canada	Perlini knocked out at 1:43 of the second round.
Win	5-7-1	Muhammad Raheem	UD	4	16/06/2000	Montreal, Quebec, Canada	
Win	2-7	Marcelo Aravena	UD	6	06/05/2000	Maniwaki, Quebec, Canada	
Win	4-11	Mark Johnson	TKO	4	29/06/1999	Montreal, Quebec, Canada	Referee stopped the bout at 1:23 of the fourth round.
Win	3-2	Tracy Wilson	KO	2	06/11/1998	Montreal, Quebec, Canada	Wilson knocked out at 0:48 of the second round.
Win	1-4	Marcelo Aravena	TKO	3	05/05/1998	Montreal, Quebec, Canada	Referee stopped the bout at 2:05 of the third round.
Win	4-8	Mark Johnson	KO	2	24/04/1998	Sherbrooke, Quebec, Canada	Johnson knocked out at 1:10 of the second round.
Win	1-3	Donald Harris	TKO	2	03/04/1998	Montreal, Quebec, Canada	Referee stopped the bout at 0:20 of the second round.

== Outside the ring ==
Bergeron is often asked to take on the analyst role in boxing matches, appearing on local Québec channel TVA and Québec radio stations. He offered his expertise on radio on Lucian Bute's championship fight at the Bell Centre in Montréal on October 19, 2007. He also served as a sparring partner to Vitali Klitchko in preparation for his fight against Corrie Sanders for the WBC world heavyweight championship in April 2004.

He has also successfully completed his firefighter training and is currently working as a firefighter at the St-Jérôme fire station.
