= Porsche-Arena =

Multi-purpose arena in Stuttgart, Germany

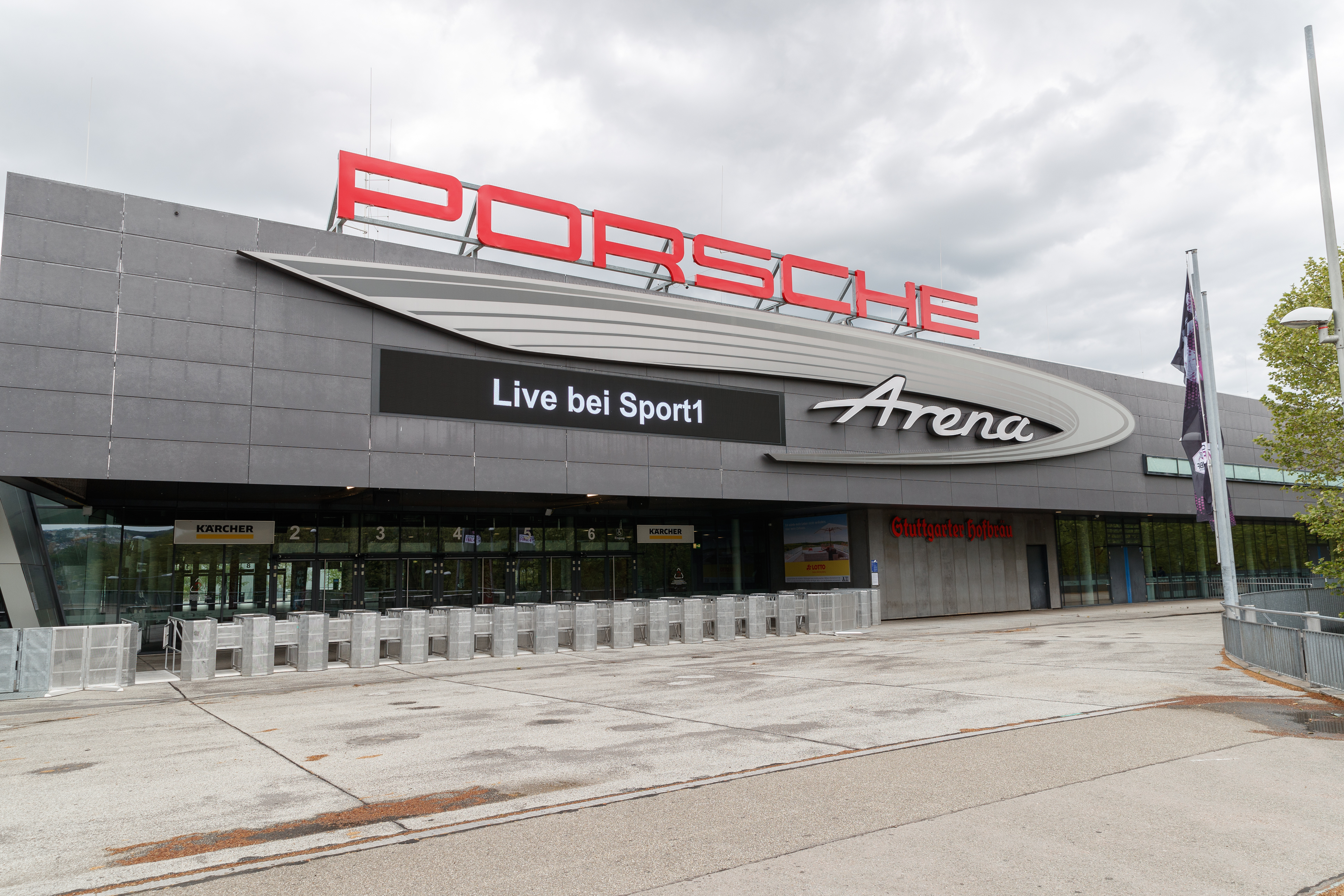
- Interactive map of Porsche-Arena
- Location: Stuttgart, Baden-Württemberg, Germany
- Coordinates: 48°47′35″N 9°13′42″E
- Owner: City of Stuttgart
- Operator: in.Stuttgart Veranstaltungsgesellschaft mbH
- Capacity: 7,849 (boxing); 7,576 (stage shows); 6,181 (basketball, handball); 6,042 (concerts); 5,068 (hockey)

Construction
- Groundbreaking: April 2005
- Opened: 27 May 2006
- Cost: €31,16 million
- Architect: 'asp' architekten Stuttgart

Tenant
- TVB Stuttgart (HBL)

Website
- Official Website

Porsche-Arena is a multi-purpose arena, located in Stuttgart, Germany. The seating capacity of the arena ranges from 5,100 to 8,000 people. It was opened in 2006, after 14 months of construction. The arena is part of a sport complex located in Stuttgart's NeckarPark, situated between the Scharrena Stuttgart, MHPArena and Hanns Martin Schleyer Halle.

To fund the construction, costs had already been pre-construction sales of the name rights planned. Dr. Ing h.c. F. Porsche AG bought the name rights, for a ten million euro, for a term of 20 years.

== Events ==
It is the venue for the Porsche Tennis Grand Prix, a WTA Tour event and also hosted some matches at the 2007 World Men's Handball Championship. Anton Hunger: "The tournament is now at home in Stuttgart. We knew we’d make mistakes at the first edition. But we didn’t promise too much last year and have eliminated almost all the mistakes in 2007. A total of more than 36,000 spectators were in the arena. The number was up on the previous year even though seating was slightly reduced to improve comfort."

== Gallery ==
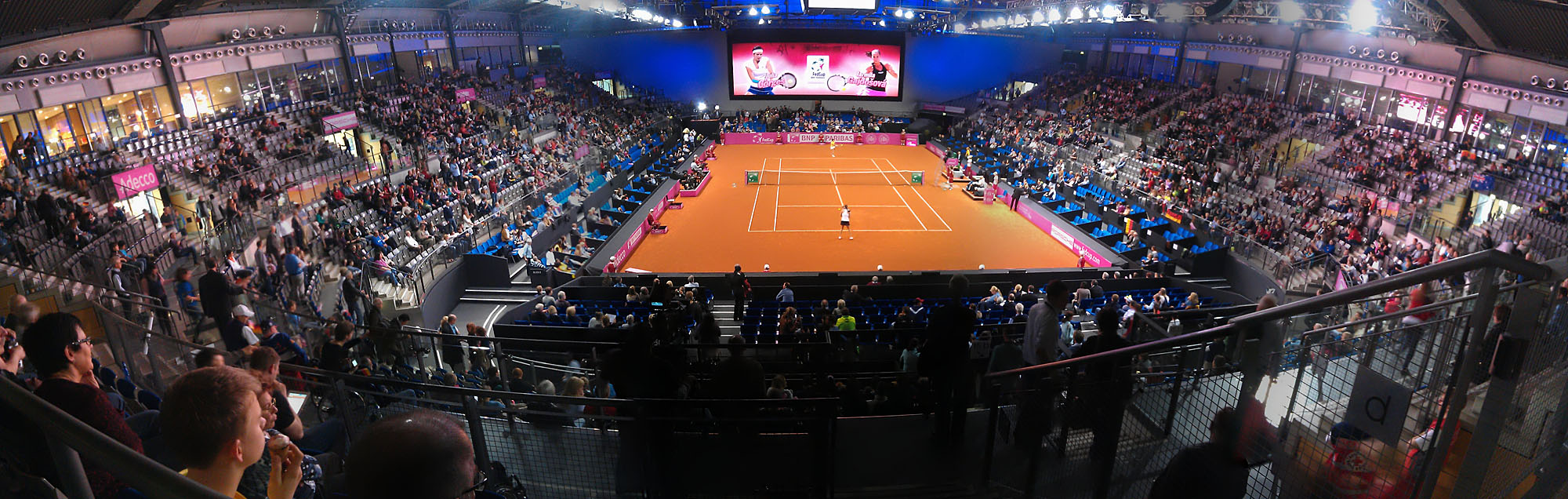
2012 Fed Cup World Group play-offs, Germany vs Australia, Julia Görges vs Jarmila Gajdošová

== See also ==
- List of tennis stadiums by capacity
