= List of world heavyweight boxing champions =

Current world heavyweight champion

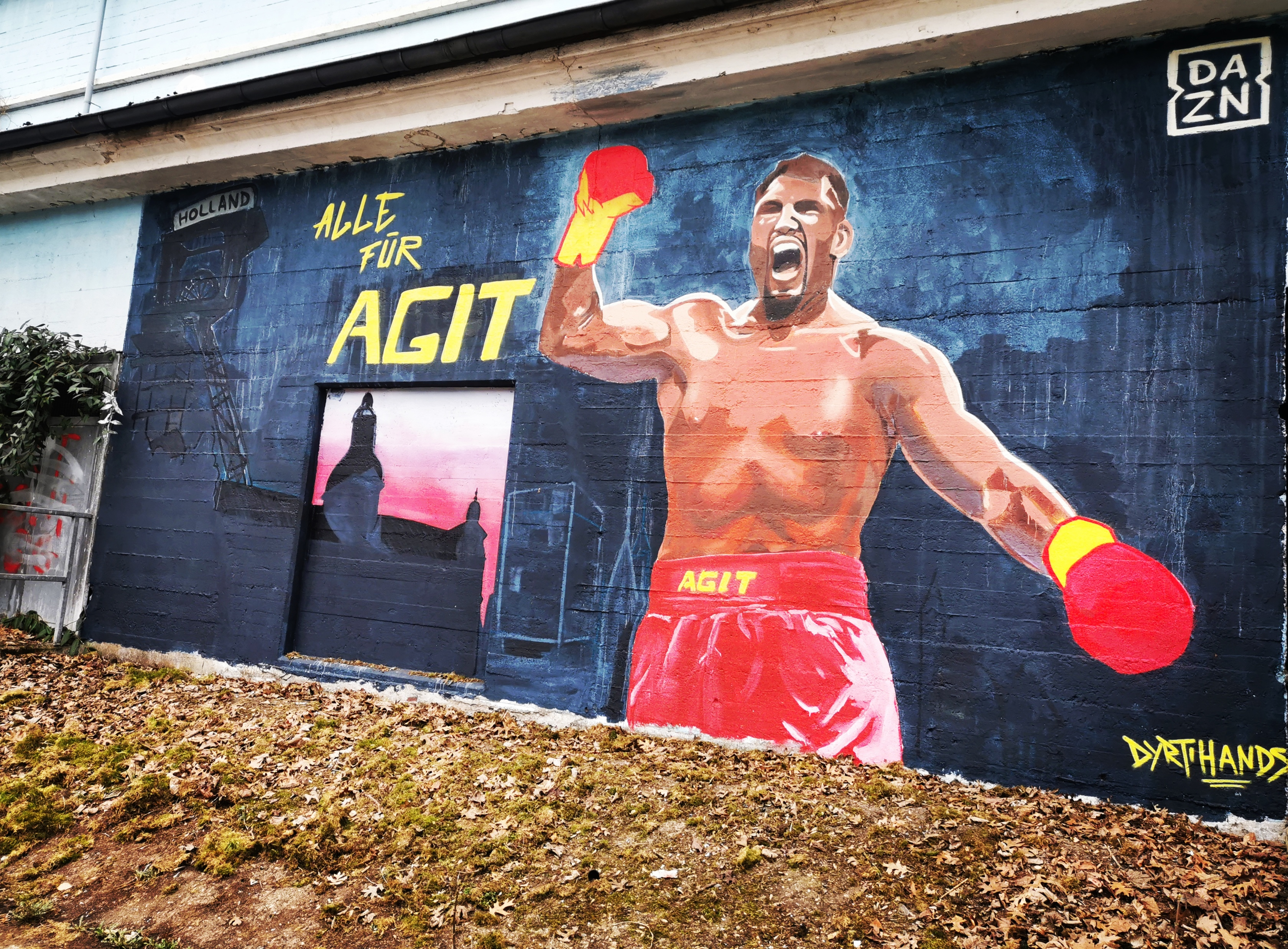
Current Heavyweight Champion Agit Kabayel

At boxing's beginning, the heavyweight division had no weight limit, and historically the weight class has gone with vague or no definition. During the 19th century, many heavyweights were 170 pounds (12 st 2 lb, 77 kg) or less, though others weighed considerably more. John L. Sullivan was the first widely recognized champion under Marquess of Queensberry Rules. Known as the "Boston Strong Boy," Sullivan weighed around 200 pounds when in shape, and helped transition the sport from its bare-knuckle era. Sullivan would be defeated for the title by "Gentleman" Jim Corbett over 21 rounds on September 7, 1892, the first heavyweight titleholder solely under Queensberry rules.

In 1920, a de facto minimum weight for a heavyweight was set at 175 pounds (12 st 7 lb, 79 kg) with the standardization of a weight limit for the light heavyweight division. The addition of the cruiserweight division, which began in 1979, reset the de facto minimum, first to 190 pounds and then to 200 pounds in 2004 when boxing's major sanctioning bodies universally raised the weight limit at which they would recognize champions. In November 2020, the World Boxing Council created a new division called bridgerweight for boxers weighing between 200 and 224 pounds, and in December 2023, the World Boxing Association followed suit. However, the WBA would later withdraw recognition of the division in June 2026. As of July 2026, no other major body has recognized the division.

The championship of the heavyweight division has been fractured or disputed at various times in its history. Until the 1960s, such disputes were settled in the ring, typically with alternate title claimants largely being forgotten. The rise of sanctioning organizations, however, have produced an environment where typically there is no single world heavyweight champion, with titleholders recognized by one of these organizations (a "World Champion") or more (a "Super Champion," a "Unified Champion," or, in the rare cases where the four most prominent organizations recognize the same boxer, an "Undisputed Champion").

Some title reigns are considered dubious owing to long periods of inactivity, the legitimacy of the organization granting championship recognition, and other factors. In 1967, for example, Muhammad Ali was denied a boxing license in every U.S. jurisdiction and stripped of his passport because of his refusal to be inducted into the armed forces. On April 29, 1967, his recognition as champion by both the World Boxing Association and World Boxing Council was withdrawn. Yet Ali remained the lineal champion and was recognized by The Ring (up until 1970) and most boxing purists until his defeat in 1971. In pursuit of greater revenues, some organizations have now adopted a practice of simultaneously recognizing multiple champions in a weight division, creating a situation in which a champion may be unable not only to secure recognition from multiple sanctioning bodies but to secure sole recognition from a single one.

== Championship recognition ==
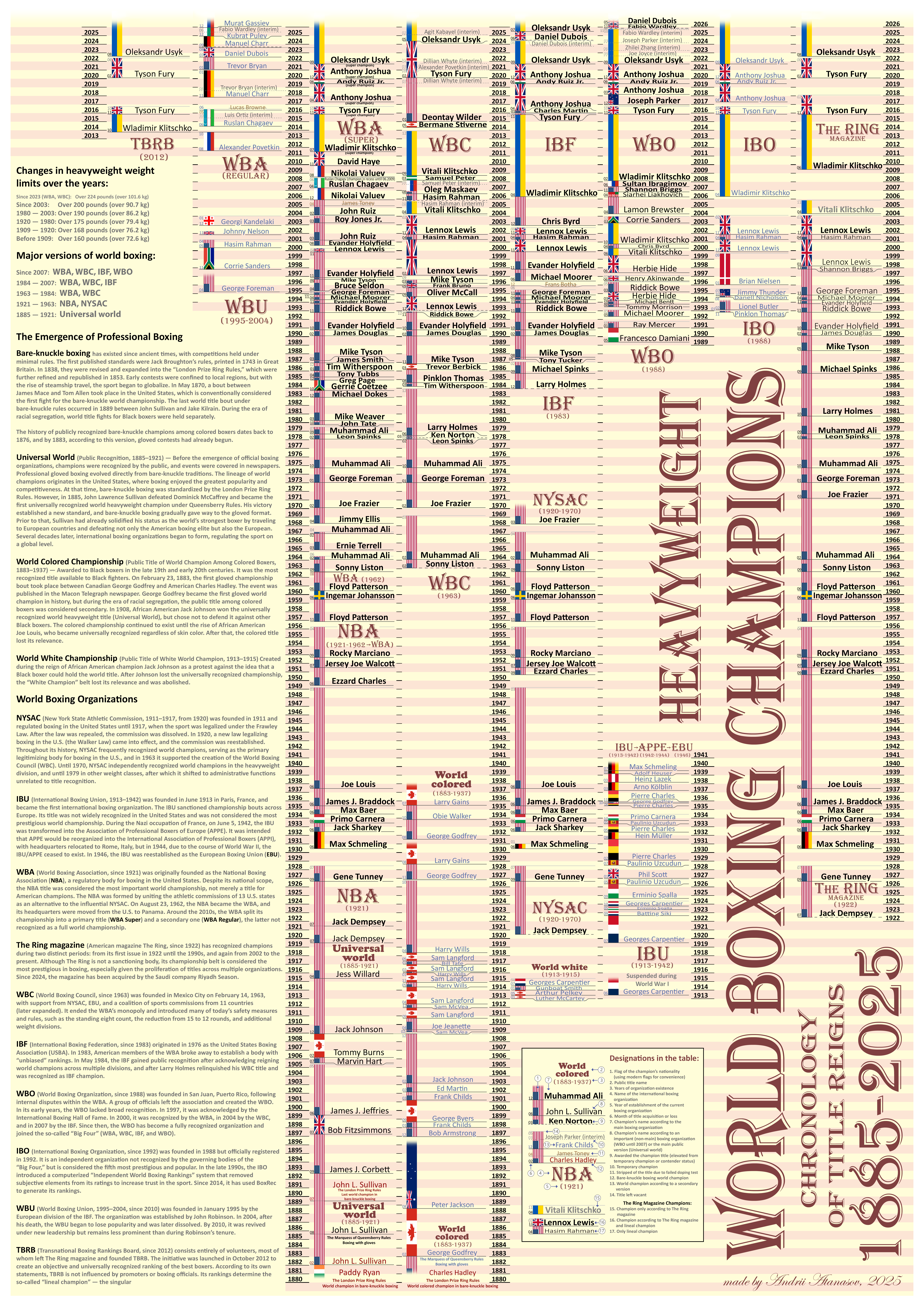
All heavyweight champions

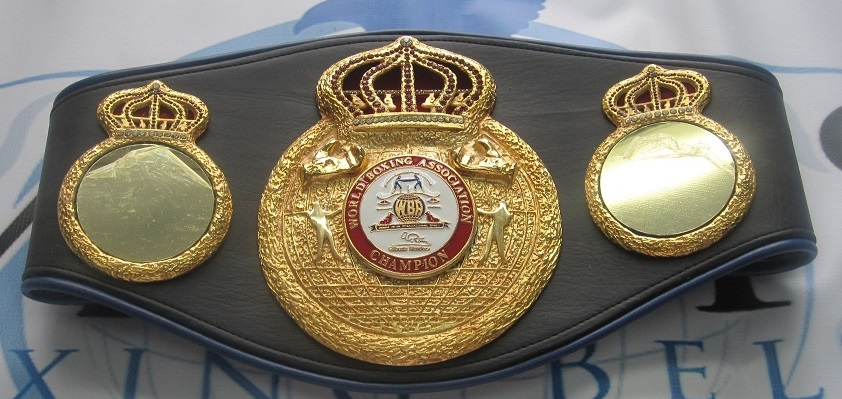
WBA championship belt

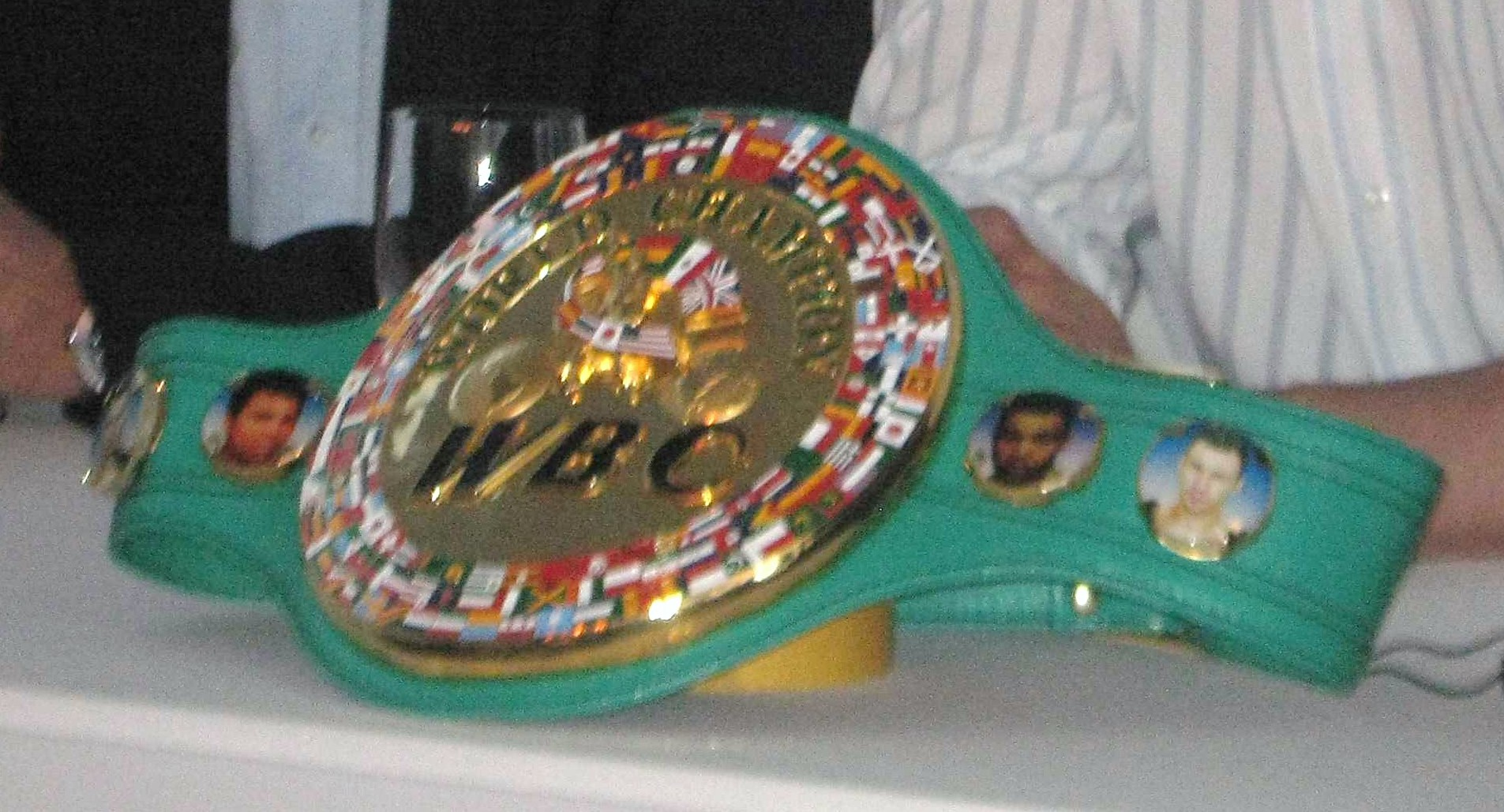
WBC championship belt

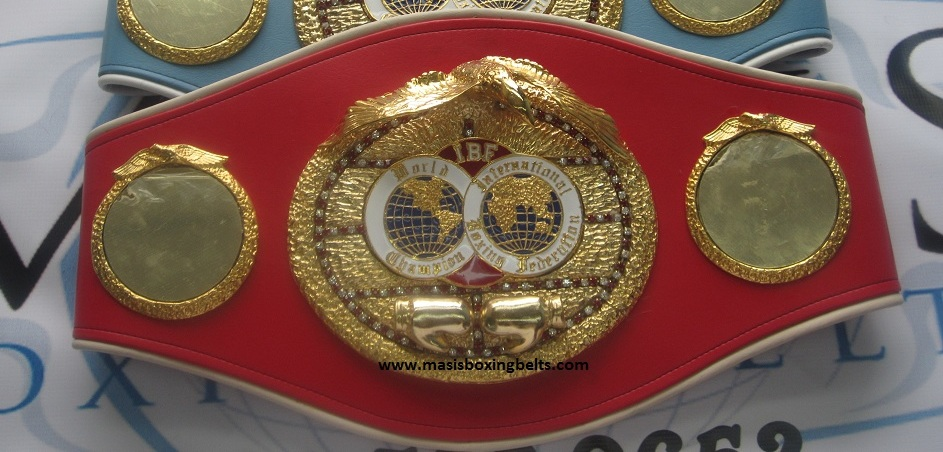
IBF championship belt

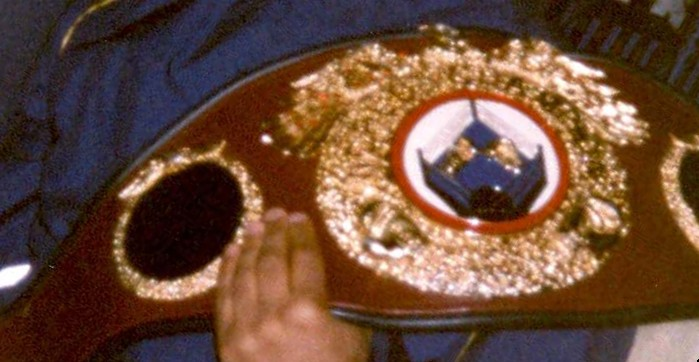
WBO championship belt

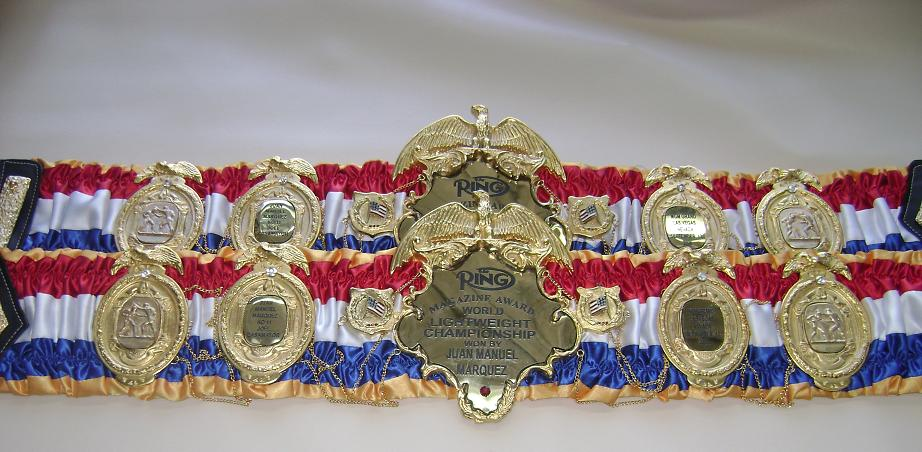
The Ring magazine championship belt

=== Public acclamation and early official recognition: 1884 to 1921 ===
World champions were initially recognized by wide public acclamation, with heavyweight champions winning and losing championship recognition solely in the ring. Retirements periodically resulted in no one true champion being recognized, while in other cases, new champions were proclaimed only to see a previously recognized champion come out of retirement. Public interest in boxing resulted in a true champion being determined by means of title claimants facing one another in the ring, with the winner being recognized as world champion.

During the transition from bare-knuckle boxing to modern gloved boxing (roughly 1888–1892), the tabloid magazine known as the National Police Gazette crowned fighters such as Jake Kilrain and John L. Sullivan, which lent credence to championship reigns. Recognition by the Gazette died out by the time Sullivan fought James J. Corbett, as gloved boxing had firmly taken over by then. One of the earliest instances of a sanctioning body crowning champions came after the passage of the Frawley Law in 1911, which legalized boxing in New York and established the New York State Athletic Commission (NYSAC), following which Jack Johnson was crowned their first champion. The Frawley Law was eventually overturned in 1917 during Jess Willard's reign, ending the first incarnation of the NYSAC and their original title lineages.

Currently, International Boxing Hall of Fame recognizes these world heavyweight title lineages from this period: (Note: See)

	Date started	First champion	Date ended	Last champion
1	August 29, 1885	John L. Sullivan	May 15, 1905	James J. Jeffries
2	July 3, 1905	Marvin Hart	September 23, 1926	Jack Dempsey

=== The Ring magazine: 1922 to present ===
The Ring has recognized heavyweight champions during two periods, commencing with its inaugural issue in 1922 and continuing until the 1990s, then again from 2002 to the present day. Under its original policy, a champion earned championship recognition in the ring, defeating the preceding champion or winning a bout between its top rated contenders. Once awarded, championship recognition could be lost only by death, retirement, or loss in the ring. In 2012, this policy was revised so championship recognition could be more easily awarded or withdrawn.

=== Sanctioning bodies: 1920 to present ===
Following the passage of the Walker Law in 1920, the NYSAC was reestablished and resumed recognizing champions. The prominence of New York City as the epicenter of boxing would lead to their belt having significance as a premier world title. The National Boxing Association (NBA) was organized in 1921 to serve as a regulating authority for boxing in the United States and to balance out the dominance of the NYSAC. A third entity, the International Boxing Union (IBU) would follow suit, but with limited exception, the three organizations recognized the same champion in each division; the only heavyweight that was recognized solely by the IBU as world champion, George Godfrey, is not counted among the canonical heavyweight champion lineage.

At its 1962 convention, the NBA's non-United States members exploited a membership rule and took effective control of the organization, rebranding it as the World Boxing Association. The now WBA would be joined the following year by a combination of state and national boxing commissions (including the NYSAC and IBU) to form a new organization, the World Boxing Council (WBC). In time, each organization would have its own spin-off sanctioning organization break from its ranks: the United States Boxing Association, which disassociated with the WBA in the late 1970s and became the International Boxing Federation in 1983, and the World Boxing Organization, whose members would split from the WBC in 1988. Today, there are over a dozen sanctioning organizations which recognize champions and sanction world championship bouts, but the WBA, WBC, IBF, and WBO are recognized by the International Boxing Hall Of Fame as major sanctioning bodies.

== Current status of championships ==
Organization	Recognition	Champion	Date won	Status of next defense
WBA	World champion	Murat Gassiev (def. Kubrat Pulev)	December 12, 2025	TBD
WBC	World champion	Agit Kabayel	N/A	vs Nelson Hysa, on November 28, 2026
IBF	World champion	Filip Hrgović	August 29, 2026	TBD
WBO	World champion	Daniel Dubois (def. Fabio Wardley)	May 9, 2026	TBD

== List of champions ==
Below is a chronological list of major world champions in the heavyweight division. Unless otherwise stated, successive titleholders won their title from the previously mentioned titleholder; otherwise, champions will be described as having won a vacant championship bout, been elevated, or been awarded their title. Bouts during a champion's reign where their title was not on the line are not included in the list of defenses. In the No. column, non-consecutive reigns by the same champion are counted in the parentheses.

No.	Champion	Recognition	Begin reign	End reign	Day(s)	Title defense(s)	Additional recognition	Note(s)	Source(s)
1	John L. Sullivan def. Dominick McCaffrey	World	August 29, 1885	September 7, 1892	2,566	–		^{25},^{4}	
2	James J. Corbett	World	September 7, 1892	March 17, 1897	1,652	def. Charley Mitchell on January 25, 1894		^{5}	
3	Bob Fitzsimmons	World	March 17, 1897	June 9, 1899	814	–			
4	James J. Jeffries	World	June 9, 1899	May 15, 1905	2,166	def. Tom Sharkey on November 3, 1899 def. John Finnegan on April 6, 1900 def. James J. Corbett on May 11, 1900 def. Gus Ruhlin on November 15, 1901 def. Bob Fitzsimmons on July 25, 1902 def. James J. Corbett on August 14, 1903 def. Jack Munroe on August 26, 1904		^{2},^{6}	
5	Marvin Hart def. Jack Root	World	July 3, 1905	February 23, 1906	235	–		^{1}	
6	Tommy Burns	World	February 23, 1906	December 26, 1908	1,037	def. James J. Walker on March 28, 1906 def. Jim O'Brien on March 28, 1906 def. Fireman Jim Flynn on October 2, 1906 draw vs. Philadelphia Jack O'Brien on November 28, 1906 def. Philadelphia Jack O'Brien on May 8, 1907 def. Bill Squires on July 4, 1907 def. Gunner Moir on December 2, 1907 def. Jack Palmer on February 10, 1908 def. Jem Roche on March 17, 1908 def. Jewey Smith on April 18, 1908 def. Bill Squires on June 13, 1908 def. Bill Squires on August 24, 1908 def. Bill Lang on September 3, 1908			
7	Jack Johnson	World	December 26, 1908	August 1911	~948	draw vs. Philadelphia Jack O'Brien on May 19, 1909 def. Al Kaufman on September 9, 1909 def. Stanley Ketchel on October 16, 1909 def. James J. Jeffries on July 4, 1910			
7	Jack Johnson	NYSAC	August 1911	April 5, 1915	~1,343	def. Fireman Jim Flynn on July 4, 1912 draw vs. Battling Jim Johnson on December 19, 1913 def. Frank Moran on June 27, 1914		^{7}	
8	Jess Willard	NYSAC	April 5, 1915	November 14, 1917	954	def. Frank Moran on March 25, 1916			
8	Jess Willard	World	November 14, 1917	July 4, 1919	597	–			
9	Jack Dempsey	World	July 4, 1919	March 25, 1920	265	–			
9	Jack Dempsey	NYSAC	March 25, 1920	July 2, 1921	464	def. Billy Miske on September 6, 1920 def. Bill Brennan on December 14, 1920			
9	Jack Dempsey	NBA, and NYSAC	July 2, 1921	September 23, 1926	1,909	def. Georges Carpentier on July 2, 1921 def. Tommy Gibbons on July 4, 1923 def. Luis Angel Firpo on September 14, 1923	The Ring awarded the title in 1922		
10	Gene Tunney	NBA, and NYSAC	September 23, 1926	July 31, 1928	677	def. Jack Dempsey on September 22, 1927 def. Tom Heeney on July 26, 1928	The Ring	^{2}	
11	Max Schmeling def. Jack Sharkey	NBA, and NYSAC	June 12, 1930	January 7, 1931	209	–	The Ring	^{1},^{8}	
11	Max Schmeling def. Jack Sharkey	NBA, and IBU	January 7, 1931	June 21, 1932	531	def. Young Stribling on July 3, 1931	The Ring	^{1}	
12	Jack Sharkey	NBA, NYSAC, and IBU	June 21, 1932	June 29, 1933	373	–	The Ring		
13	Primo Carnera	NBA, NYSAC, and IBU	June 29, 1933	June 14, 1934	350	def. Paulino Uzcudun on October 22, 1933 def. Tommy Loughran on March 1, 1934	The Ring	^{1}	
14	Max Baer	NBA, NYSAC, and IBU	June 14, 1934	June 13, 1935	364	–	The Ring	^{9}	
15	James J. Braddock	NBA, NYSAC, and IBU	June 13, 1935	June 22, 1937	740	–	The Ring		
16	Joe Louis	NBA, NYSAC, and IBU	June 22, 1937	March 1, 1949	4,270	def. Tommy Farr on August 30, 1937 def. Nathan Mann on February 23, 1938 def. Harry Thomas on April 4, 1938 def. Max Schmeling on June 22, 1938 def. John Henry Lewis on January 25, 1939 def. Jack Roper on April 17, 1939 def. Tony Galento on June 28, 1939 def. Bob Pastor on September 20, 1939 def. Arturo Godoy on February 9, 1940 def. Johnny Paychek on March 29, 1940 def. Arturo Godoy on June 20, 1940 def. Al McCoy on December 16, 1940 def. Red Burman on January 31, 1941 def. Gus Dorazio on February 17, 1941 def. Abe Simon on March 21, 1941 def. Tony Musto on April 8, 1941 def. Buddy Baer on May 23, 1941 def. Billy Conn on June 18, 1941 def. Lou Nova on September 29, 1941 def. Buddy Baer on January 9, 1942 def. Abe Simon on March 27, 1942 def. Johnny Davis on November 14, 1944 def. Billy Conn on June 19, 1946 def. Tami Mauriello on September 18, 1946 def. Jersey Joe Walcott on December 5, 1947 def. Jersey Joe Walcott on June 25, 1948	The Ring	^{2}	
17	Ezzard Charles def. Jersey Joe Walcott	NBA	June 22, 1949	September 27, 1950	462	def. Gus Lesnevich on August 10, 1949 def. Pat Valentino on October 14, 1949 def. Freddie Beshore on August 15, 1950 def. Joe Louis on September 27, 1950	The Ring	^{1},^{10}	
17	Ezzard Charles def. Jersey Joe Walcott	NBA, and NYSAC	September 27, 1950	June 16, 1951	261	def. Nick Barone on December 5, 1950 def. Lee Oma on January 12, 1951 def. Jersey Joe Walcott on March 7, 1951 def. Joey Maxim on May 30, 1951	The Ring	^{1},^{10}	
17	Ezzard Charles def. Jersey Joe Walcott	NBA, NYSAC, and IBU	June 16, 1951	July 18, 1951	33	–	The Ring		
18	Jersey Joe Walcott	NBA and NYSAC	July 18, 1951	September 23, 1952	433	def. Ezzard Charles on June 5, 1952	The Ring		
19	Rocky Marciano	NBA and NYSAC	September 23, 1952	April 27, 1956	1,312	def. Jersey Joe Walcott on March 15, 1953 def. Roland LaStarza on September 24, 1953 def. Ezzard Charles on June 17, 1954 def. Ezzard Charles on September 17, 1954 def. Don Cockell on May 16, 1955 def. Archie Moore on September 21, 1955	The Ring	^{2}	
20	Floyd Patterson def. Archie Moore	NBA and NYSAC	November 30, 1956	June 26, 1959	938	def. Tommy Jackson on July 29, 1957 def. Pete Rademacher on August 22, 1957 def. Roy Harris on August 18, 1958 def. Brian London on May 1, 1959	The Ring	^{1},^{11}	
21	Ingemar Johansson	NBA and NYSAC	June 26, 1959	June 20, 1960	360	–	The Ring		
(22)	Floyd Patterson (Second reign)	NBA and NYSAC	June 20, 1960	September 25, 1962	827	def. Ingemar Johansson on March 13, 1961 def. Tom McNeeley on December 4, 1961	The Ring		
22 (23)	Sonny Liston	NYSAC and WBA	September 25, 1962	July 22, 1963	270	def. Floyd Patterson on July 22, 1963	The Ring		
22 (23)	Sonny Liston	NYSAC, WBA, and WBC	July 22, 1963	February 25, 1964	248	–	The Ring		
23 (24)	Muhammad Ali	NYSAC, WBA, and WBC	February 25, 1964	June 19, 1964	115	–	The Ring	^{12}	
23 (24)	Muhammad Ali	NYSAC, and WBC	June 19, 1964	February 6, 1967	962	def. Sonny Liston on May 25, 1965 def. Floyd Patterson on November 22, 1965 def. George Chuvalo on March 29, 1966 def. Henry Cooper on May 21, 1966 def. Brian London on August 6, 1966 def. Karl Mildenberger on September 10, 1966 def. Cleveland Williams on November 14, 1966 def. Ernie Terrell on February 6, 1967	The Ring		
23 (24)	Muhammad Ali	NYSAC, WBA, and WBC	February 6, 1967	April 29, 1967	82	def. Zora Folley on March 22, 1967	The Ring	^{13}	
24 (25)	Ernie Terrell def. Eddie Machen	WBA	March 5, 1965	February 6, 1967	703	def. George Chuvalo on November 1, 1965 def. Doug Jones on June 28, 1966	–	^{1}	
25 (26)	Joe Frazier def. Buster Mathis	NYSAC	March 4, 1968	February 16, 1970	714	def. Manuel Ramos on June 24, 1968 def. Oscar Bonavena on December 10, 1968 def. Dave Zyglewicz on April 22, 1969 def. Jerry Quarry on June 23, 1969 def. Jimmy Ellis on February 16, 1970	The Ring awarded the title in May 1970	^{1}	
25 (26)	Joe Frazier def. Buster Mathis	WBA, and WBC	February 16, 1970	January 22, 1973	1,071	def. Bob Foster on November 18, 1970 def. Muhammad Ali on March 8, 1971 def. Terry Daniels on January 15, 1972 def. Ron Stander on May 25, 1972	The Ring awarded the title in May 1970	^{15}	
26 (27)	Jimmy Ellis def. Jerry Quarry	WBA	April 27, 1968	February 16, 1970	660	def. Floyd Patterson on September 14, 1968	–	^{1},^{14}	
27 (28)	George Foreman	WBA and WBC	January 22, 1973	October 30, 1974	646	def. José Roman on September 1, 1973 def. Ken Norton on March 26, 1974	The Ring	^{1},^{10}	
(29)	Muhammad Ali (Second reign)	WBA and WBC	October 30, 1974	February 15, 1978	1,204	def. Chuck Wepner on March 24, 1975 def. Ron Lyle on May 16, 1975 def. Joe Bugner on June 30, 1975 def. Joe Frazier on October 1, 1975 def. Jean-Pierre Coopman on February 20, 1976 def. Jimmy Young on April 30, 1976 def. Richard Dunn on May 24, 1976 def. Ken Norton on September 28, 1976 def. Alfredo Evangelista on May 16, 1977 def. Earnie Shavers on September 29, 1977	The Ring		
28 (30)	Leon Spinks	WBA and WBC	February 15, 1978	March 18, 1978	31	–	The Ring	^{3}	
28 (30)	Leon Spinks	WBA	March 18, 1978	September 15, 1978	181	–	The Ring		
29 (31)	Ken Norton awarded the title	WBC	March 18, 1978	June 9, 1978	83	–	–	^{16}	
30 (32)	Larry Holmes	WBC	June 9, 1978	December 11, 1983	2,011	def. Alfredo Evangelista on November 10, 1978 def. Ossie Ocasio on March 23, 1979 def. Mike Weaver on June 22, 1979 def. Earnie Shavers on September 28, 1979 def. Lorenzo Zanon on February 3, 1980 def. Leroy Jones on March 31, 1980 def. Scott LeDoux on July 7, 1980 def. Muhammad Ali on October 2, 1980 def. Trevor Berbick on April 11, 1981 def. Leon Spinks on June 12, 1981 def. Renaldo Snipes on November 6, 1981 def. Gerry Cooney on June 11, 1982 def. Randall "Tex" Cobb on November 26, 1982 def. Lucien Rodriguez on March 27, 1983 def. Tim Witherspoon on May 20, 1983 def. Scott Frank on September 10, 1983	The Ring awarded the title on March 31, 1980	^{2}	
30 (32)	Larry Holmes	IBF	December 11, 1983	September 21, 1985	650	def. James Smith on November 9, 1984 def. David Bey on March 15, 1985 def. Carl Williams on May 20, 1985	The Ring awarded the title on March 31, 1980	^{17}	
(33)	Muhammad Ali (Third reign)	WBA	September 15, 1978	July 3, 1979	288	–	The Ring	^{2}	
31 (34)	John Tate def. Gerrie Coetzee	WBA	October 20, 1979	March 31, 1980	163	–	–	^{1}	
32 (35)	Mike Weaver	WBA	March 31, 1980	December 10, 1982	984	def. Gerrie Coetzee on October 25, 1980 def. James Tillis on October 3, 1981	–		
33 (36)	Michael Dokes	WBA	December 10, 1982	September 23, 1983	287	draw vs. Mike Weaver on May 20, 1983	–		
34 (37)	Gerrie Coetzee	WBA	September 23, 1983	December 1, 1984	435	–	–		
35 (38)	Tim Witherspoon def. Greg Page	WBC	March 9, 1984	August 31, 1984	175	–	–	^{1}	
36 (39)	Pinklon Thomas	WBC	August 31, 1984	March 22, 1986	568	def. Mike Weaver on June 15, 1985	–		
37 (40)	Greg Page	WBA	December 1, 1984	April 29, 1985	149	–	–		
38 (41)	Tony Tubbs	WBA	April 29, 1985	January 17, 1986	263	–	–		
39 (42)	Michael Spinks	IBF	September 21, 1985	February 26, 1987	523	def. Larry Holmes on April 19, 1986 def. Steffen Tangstad on September 6, 1986	The Ring	^{3}	
(43)	Tim Witherspoon (Second reign)	WBA	January 17, 1986	December 12, 1986	329	def. Frank Bruno on July 19, 1986	–		
40 (44)	Trevor Berbick	WBC	March 22, 1986	November 22, 1986	245	–	–		
41 (45)	Mike Tyson	WBC	November 22, 1986	March 7, 1987	105	def. James Smith on March 7, 1987	The Ring def. Michael Spinks on June 27, 1988		
41 (45)	Mike Tyson	WBA and WBC	March 7, 1987	August 1, 1987	147	def. Pinklon Thomas on May 30, 1987 def. Tony Tucker on August 1, 1987	The Ring def. Michael Spinks on June 27, 1988		
41 (45)	Mike Tyson	WBA, WBC, and IBF	August 1, 1987	February 11, 1990	925	def. Tyrell Biggs on October 16, 1987 def. Larry Holmes on January 22, 1988 def. Tony Tubbs on March 21, 1988 def. Michael Spinks on June 27, 1988 def. Frank Bruno on February 25, 1989 def. Carl Williams on July 21, 1989	The Ring def. Michael Spinks on June 27, 1988		
42 (46)	James "Bonecrusher" Smith	WBA	December 12, 1986	March 7, 1987	85	–	–		
43 (47)	Tony Tucker def. Buster Douglas	IBF	May 30, 1987	August 1, 1987	64	–	–	^{1}	
44 (48)	Francesco Damiani def. Johnny du Plooy	WBO	May 6, 1989	January 11, 1991	616	def. Daniel Eduardo Neto on December 16, 1989	–	^{1}	
45 (49)	James "Buster" Douglas	WBA, WBC, and IBF	February 11, 1990	October 25, 1990	257	–	–		
46 (50)	Evander Holyfield	WBA, WBC, and IBF	October 25, 1990	November 13, 1992	751	def. George Foreman on April 19, 1991 def. Bert Cooper on November 23, 1991 def. Larry Holmes on June 19, 1992	–		
47 (51)	Ray Mercer	WBO	January 11, 1991	December 24, 1991	348	def. Tommy Morrison on October 18, 1991	–	^{3}	
48 (52)	Michael Moorer def. Bert Cooper	WBO	May 15, 1992	February 3, 1993	265	–	–	^{1},^{2}	
49 (53)	Riddick Bowe	WBA, WBC, and IBF	November 13, 1992	December 14, 1992	32	–	–	^{2}	
49 (53)	Riddick Bowe	WBA, and IBF	December 14, 1992	November 6, 1993	328	def. Michael Dokes on February 6, 1993 def. Jesse Ferguson on May 22, 1993	–		
50 (54)	Lennox Lewis awarded the title	WBC	December 14, 1992	September 24, 1994	650	def. Tony Tucker on May 8, 1993 def. Frank Bruno on October 1, 1993 def. Phil Jackson on May 6, 1994	–	^{18}	
51 (55)	Tommy Morrison def. George Foreman	WBO	June 7, 1993	October 29, 1993	145	def. Tim Tomashek on August 30, 1993	–	^{1}	
52 (56)	Michael Bentt	WBO	October 29, 1993	March 19, 1994	142	–	–		
(57)	Evander Holyfield (Second reign)	WBA, and IBF	November 6, 1993	April 22, 1994	168	–	–		
53 (58)	Herbie Hide	WBO	March 19, 1994	March 11, 1995	358	–	–		
(59)	Michael Moorer (Second reign)	WBA, and IBF	April 22, 1994	November 5, 1994	198	–	–		
54 (60)	Oliver McCall	WBC	September 24, 1994	September 2, 1995	344	def. Larry Holmes on April 8, 1995	–		
(61)	George Foreman (Second reign)	WBA, and IBF	November 5, 1994	March 4, 1995	119	–	–	^{3}	
(61)	George Foreman (Second reign)	IBF	March 4, 1995	June 29, 1995	117	def. Axel Schulz on April 22, 1995	−	^{2}	
(62)	Riddick Bowe (Second reign)	WBO	March 11, 1995	May 1, 1996	418	def. Jorge Luis Gonzalez on June 17, 1995	–	^{3}	
55 (63)	Bruce Seldon def. Tony Tucker	WBA	April 8, 1995	September 7, 1996	519	def. Joe Hipp on August 19, 1995	–	^{1}	
56 (64)	Frank Bruno	WBC	September 2, 1995	March 16, 1996	197	–	–		
(65)	Mike Tyson (Second reign)	WBC	March 16, 1996	September 7, 1996	175	–	–		
(65)	Mike Tyson (Second reign)	WBA, and WBC	September 7, 1996	September 24, 1996	17	–	–	^{2}	
(65)	Mike Tyson (Second reign)	WBA	September 24, 1996	November 9, 1996	46	–	–		
(66)	Michael Moorer (Third reign) def. Axel Schulz	IBF	June 22, 1996	November 8, 1997	505	def. Francois Botha on November 9, 1996 def. Vaughn Bean on March 29, 1997	–	^{1},^{19}	
57 (67)	Henry Akinwande def. Jeremy Williams	WBO	June 29, 1996	February 17, 1997	234	def. Alexander Zolkin on November 9, 1996 def. Scott Welch on January 11, 1997	–	^{1},^{2}	
(68)	Evander Holyfield (Third reign)	WBA	November 9, 1996	November 8, 1997	365	def. Mike Tyson on June 28, 1997 def. Michael Moorer on November 8, 1997	–		
(68)	Evander Holyfield (Third reign)	WBA, and IBF	November 8, 1997	November 13, 1999	736	def. Vaughn Bean on September 19, 1998 draw vs. Lennox Lewis on March 13, 1999	–		
(69)	Lennox Lewis (Second reign) def. Oliver McCall	WBC	February 7, 1997	November 13, 1999	1010	def. Henry Akinwande on July 12, 1997 def. Andrzej Golota on October 4, 1997 def. Shannon Briggs on March 28, 1998 def. Željko Mavrović on September 26, 1998 draw vs. Evander Holyfield on March 13, 1999 def. Evander Holyfield on November 13, 1999	–	^{1}	
(69)	Lennox Lewis (Second reign) def. Oliver McCall	WBA, WBC, and IBF	November 13, 1999	April 29, 2000	168	–	–	^{3}	
(69)	Lennox Lewis (Second reign) def. Oliver McCall	WBC, and IBF	April 29, 2000	April 22, 2001	358	def. Michael Grant on April 29, 2000 def. Francois Botha on July 15, 2000 def. David Tua on November 11, 2000	–		
(70)	Herbie Hide (Second reign) def. Tony Tucker	WBO	June 28, 1997	June 26, 1999	729	def. Damon Reed on April 18, 1998 def. Wilhelm Fischer on September 26, 1998	–	^{1}	
58 (71)	Vitali Klitschko	WBO	June 26, 1999	April 1, 2000	281	def. Ed Mahone on October 9, 1999 def. Obed Sullivan on December 11, 1999	–		
59 (72)	Chris Byrd	WBO	April 1, 2000	October 14, 2000	197	–	–		
(73)	Evander Holyfield (Fourth reign) def. John Ruiz	WBA	August 12, 2000	March 3, 2001	204	–	–	^{1}	
60 (74)	Wladimir Klitschko	WBO	October 14, 2000	March 8, 2003	876	def. Derrick Jefferson on March 24, 2001 def. Charles Shufford on August 4, 2001 def. Francois Botha on March 16, 2002 def. Ray Mercer on June 29, 2002 def. Jameel McCline on December 7, 2002	–		
61 (75)	John Ruiz	WBA	March 3, 2001	March 1, 2003	729	draw vs. Evander Holyfield on December 15, 2001 def. Kirk Johnson on July 27, 2002	–		
62 (76)	Hasim Rahman	WBC and IBF	April 22, 2001	November 17, 2001	210	–	–		
(77)	Lennox Lewis (Third reign)	WBC and IBF	November 17, 2001	September 5, 2002	293	def. Mike Tyson on June 8, 2002	The Ring awarded the title in 2002	^{2}	
(77)	Lennox Lewis (Third reign)	WBC	September 5, 2002	February 6, 2004	519	def. Vitali Klitschko on June 21, 2003	The Ring awarded the title in 2002	^{2}	
(78)	Chris Byrd (Second reign) def. Evander Holyfield	IBF	December 14, 2002	April 22, 2006	1,591	def. Fres Oquendo on September 20, 2003 draw vs. Andrzej Golota on April 17, 2004 def. Jameel McCline on November 13, 2004 def. DaVarryl Williamson on October 1, 2005	–	^{1}	
63 (79)	Roy Jones Jr.	WBA	March 1, 2003	February 20, 2004	357	–	–	^{2}	
64 (80)	Corrie Sanders	WBO	March 8, 2003	October 9, 2003	216	–	–	^{2}	
(81)	John Ruiz (Second reign) def. Hasim Rahman for interim title	WBA	February 20, 2004	December 17, 2005	667	def. Fres Oquendo on April 17, 2004 def. Andrzej Golota on November 13, 2004	–	^{20}	
65 (82)	Lamon Brewster def. Wladimir Klitschko	WBO	April 10, 2004	April 1, 2006	722	def. Kali Meehan on September 4, 2004 def. Andrzej Golota on May 21, 2005 def. Luan Krasniqi on September 28, 2005	–	^{1}	
(83)	Vitali Klitschko (Second reign) def. Corrie Sanders	WBC	April 24, 2004	November 9, 2005	565	def. Danny Williams on December 11, 2004	The Ring	^{1},^{2}	
(84)	Hasim Rahman (Second reign) def. Monte Barrett for interim title	WBC	November 9, 2005	August 12, 2006	277	draw vs. James Toney on March 18, 2006	–	^{21}	
66 (85)	Nikolai Valuev	WBA	December 17, 2005	April 14, 2007	484	def. Owen Beck on June 3, 2006 def. Monte Barrett on October 7, 2006 def. Jameel McCline on January 20, 2007	–	^{1},^{10}	
67 (86)	Siarhei Liakhovich	WBO	April 1, 2006	November 4, 2006	218	–	–		
(87)	Wladimir Klitschko (Second reign)	IBF	April 22, 2006	February 23, 2008	673	def. Calvin Brock on November 11, 2006 def. Ray Austin on March 10, 2007 def. Lamon Brewster on July 7, 2007 def. Sultan Ibragimov on February 23, 2008	The Ring def. Ruslan Chagaev on June 20, 2009		
(87)	Wladimir Klitschko (Second reign)	IBF and WBO	February 23, 2008	July 2, 2011	1,226	def. Tony Thompson on July 12, 2008 def. Hasim Rahman on December 13, 2008 def. Ruslan Chagaev on June 20, 2009 def. Eddie Chambers on March 20, 2010 def. Samuel Peter on September 11, 2010 def. David Haye on July 2, 2011	The Ring def. Ruslan Chagaev on June 20, 2009		
(87)	Wladimir Klitschko (Second reign)	WBA (Super), IBF, and WBO	July 2, 2011	November 28, 2015	1,611	def. Jean-Marc Mormeck on March 13, 2012 def. Tony Thompson on July 7, 2012 def. Mariusz Wach on November 10, 2012 def. Francesco Pianeta on May 4, 2013 def. Alexander Povetkin on October 5, 2013 def. Alex Leapai on April 26, 2014 def. Kubrat Pulev on November 15, 2014 def. Bryant Jennings on April 25, 2015	The Ring def. Ruslan Chagaev on June 20, 2009		
68 (88)	Oleg Maskaev	WBC	August 12, 2006	March 8, 2008	576	def. Okello Peter on December 10, 2006	–		
69 (89)	Shannon Briggs	WBO	November 4, 2006	June 2, 2007	211	–	–		
70 (90)	Ruslan Chagaev	WBA	April 14, 2007	July 3, 2008	799	def. Matt Skelton on January 19, 2008	–	^{22}	
71 (91)	Sultan Ibragimov	WBO	June 2, 2007	February 23, 2008	267	def. Evander Holyfield on October 13, 2007	–		
72 (92)	Samuel Peter	WBC	March 8, 2008	October 11, 2008	218	–	–		
(93)	Nikolai Valuev (Second reign) def. John Ruiz	WBA	August 30, 2008	November 7, 2009	435	def. Evander Holyfield on December 20, 2008	–	^{1},^{22}	
(94)	Vitali Klitschko (Third reign)	WBC	October 11, 2008	December 15, 2013	1,892	def. Juan Carlos Gomez on March 21, 2009 def. Chris Arreola on September 26, 2009 def. Kevin Johnson on December 12, 2009 def. Albert Sosnowski on May 29, 2010 def. Shannon Briggs on October 16, 2010 def. Odlanier Solís on March 19, 2011 def. Tomasz Adamek on September 10, 2011 def. Derek Chisora on February 18, 2012 def. Mahmoud Charr on September 8, 2012	–	^{2}	
73 (95)	David Haye	WBA	November 7, 2009	July 2, 2011	603	def. John Ruiz on April 3, 2010 def. Audley Harrison on November 13, 2010	–		
–	Alexander Povetkin def. Ruslan Chagaev	WBA (Regular)	August 27, 2011	October 5, 2013	771	def. Cedric Boswell on December 3, 2011 def. Marco Huck on February 25, 2012 def. Hasim Rahman on September 29, 2012 def. Andrzej Wawrzyk on May 17, 2013	–	^{1},^{23}	
74 (96)	Bermane Stiverne def. Chris Arreola	WBC	May 10, 2014	January 17, 2015	253	–	–	^{1}	
–	Ruslan Chagaev def. Fres Oquendo	WBA (Regular)	July 6, 2014	March 5, 2016	609	def. Francesco Pianeta on July 11, 2015	–	^{1}	
75 (97)	Deontay Wilder	WBC	January 17, 2015	February 22, 2020	1,863	def. Eric Molina on June 13, 2015 def. Johann Duhaupas on September 26, 2015 def. Artur Szpilka on January 16, 2016 def. Chris Arreola on July 16, 2016 def. Gerald Washington on February 25, 2017 def. Bermane Stiverne on November 4, 2017 def. Luis Ortiz on March 3, 2018 draw vs. Tyson Fury on December 1, 2018 def. Dominic Breazeale on May 18, 2019 def. Luis Ortiz on November 23, 2019	–		
76 (98)	Tyson Fury	WBA (Super), IBF, and WBO	November 28, 2015	December 8, 2015	11	–	The Ring	^{3}	
76 (98)	Tyson Fury	WBA (Super) and WBO	December 8, 2015	October 12, 2016	310	–	The Ring	^{2}	
77 (99)	Charles Martin def. Vyacheslav Glazkov	IBF	January 16, 2016	April 9, 2016	85	–	–	^{1}	
–	Lucas Browne	WBA (Regular)	March 5, 2016	May 12, 2016	69	–	–	^{24}	
78 (100)	Anthony Joshua	IBF	April 9, 2016	April 29, 2017	386	def. Dominic Breazeale on June 25, 2016 def. Eric Molina on December 10, 2016 def. Wladimir Klitschko on April 29, 2017	–		
78 (100)	Anthony Joshua	WBA (Super) and IBF	April 29, 2017	March 31, 2018	337	def. Carlos Takam on October 28, 2017 def. Joseph Parker on March 31, 2018	–	^{1}	
78 (100)	Anthony Joshua	WBA (Super), IBF, WBO	March 31, 2018	June 1, 2019	428	def. Alexander Povetkin on September 22, 2018	–		
–	Ruslan Chagaev awarded the title	WBA (Regular)	May 12, 2016	July 25, 2016	75	–	–	^{3}	
79 (101)	Joseph Parker def. Andy Ruiz Jr.	WBO	December 10, 2016	March 31, 2018	477	def. Răzvan Cojanu on May 6, 2017 def. Hughie Fury on September 23, 2017	–	^{1}	
–	Mahmoud Charr def. Alexander Ustinov	WBA (Regular)	November 25, 2017	January 29, 2021	1,162	–	–	^{1}	
80 (102)	Andy Ruiz Jr.	WBA (Super), IBF, WBO	June 1, 2019	December 7, 2019	190	–	–		
(103)	Anthony Joshua (Second reign)	WBA (Super), IBF, WBO	December 7, 2019	September 25, 2021	659	def. Kubrat Pulev on December 12, 2020	–		
(104)	Tyson Fury (Second reign)	WBC	February 22, 2020	May 18, 2024	1,548	def. Deontay Wilder on October 9, 2021 def. Dillian Whyte on April 23, 2022 def. Derek Chisora on December 3, 2022	The Ring		
–	Trevor Bryan def. Bermane Stiverne	WBA (Regular)	January 29, 2021	June 11, 2022	498	def. Jonathan Guidry on January 29, 2022	–	^{1},^{26}	
81 (105)	Oleksandr Usyk	WBA (Super), IBF, WBO	September 25, 2021	May 18, 2024	967	def. Anthony Joshua on August 20, 2022 def. Daniel Dubois on August 26, 2023 def. Tyson Fury on May 18, 2024	The Ring def. Anthony Joshua on August 20, 2022	^{2}	
81 (105)	Oleksandr Usyk	WBA (Super), WBC, IBF, WBO	May 18, 2024	June 25, 2024	38		The Ring def. Anthony Joshua on August 20, 2022	^{2}	
81 (105)	Oleksandr Usyk	WBA (Super), WBC, WBO	June 25, 2024	July 19, 2025	389	def. Tyson Fury on December 21, 2024 def. Daniel Dubois on July 19, 2025	The Ring def. Anthony Joshua on August 20, 2022	^{2}	
81 (105)	Oleksandr Usyk	WBA (Super), WBC, IBF, WBO	July 19, 2025	November 17, 2025	121		The Ring def. Anthony Joshua on August 20, 2022	^{2}	
81 (105)	Oleksandr Usyk	WBA (Super), WBC, IBF	November 17, 2025	June 26, 2026	221	def. Rico Verhoeven on May 23, 2026	The Ring def. Anthony Joshua on August 20, 2022	^{2}	
–	Daniel Dubois	WBA (Regular)	June 11, 2022	August 26, 2023	441	def. Kevin Lerena on December 3, 2022	–		
–	Mahmoud Charr reinstated by legal appeal	WBA (Regular)	August 31, 2023	December 7, 2024	464		−		
82 (106)	Daniel Dubois def. Filip Hrgović for interim title	IBF	June 26, 2024	July 19, 2025	388	def. Anthony Joshua on September 21, 2024	–		
–	Kubrat Pulev	WBA (Regular)	December 7, 2024	December 12, 2025	370		−		
83 (107)	Fabio Wardley def. Joseph Parker for interim title	WBO	November 17, 2025	May 9, 2026	365		−		
–	Murat Gassiev	WBA (Regular)	December 12, 2025	June 26, 2026	196		−		
(108)	Daniel Dubois (Second reign)	WBO	May 9, 2026	Present	192	def. Fabio Wardley on October 17, 2026	−		
84 (109)	Murat Gassiev elevated to primary champion	WBA	June 26, 2026	Present	144	def. Peter Kadiru on July 11, 2026	−		
85 (110)	Agit Kabayel def. Zhilei Zhang for interim title	WBC	June 27, 2026	Present	143		–		
86 (111)	Filip Hrgović def. Moses Itauma	IBF	August 29, 2026	Present	80		–	^{1}	

=== Footnotes ===
1. Won vacant championship title.
2. Voluntarily relinquished championship title.
3. Championship recognition withdrawn by sanctioning organization upon his refusal to fight an opponent of the organization's designation.
4. In 1882, Sullivan defeated Paddy Ryan to win the bare-knuckle championship of America. A lack of legitimate challengers elsewhere gradually resulted in Sullivan earning worldwide recognition. On August 29, 1885, he defeated Dominick McCaffrey in a bout described as "the Marquess of Queensberry glove contest for the championship of the world."
5. Corbett announced his retirement from boxing in 1895, nominating Steve O'Donnell as his successor. As tradition demanded the title be won in the ring, O'Donnell was matched against Peter Maher on November 11, 1895, at Maspeth, New York. Maher won via first-round knockout, but the public generally didn't accept Maher and Maher himself expressed a desire to fight Corbett for the "real" title. In Maher's next bout, Bob Fitzsimmons defeated him via first-round knockout on February 21, 1896. Fitzsimmons in turn was defeated by Tom Sharkey of Dundalk on December 2, 1896, in a contest billed as for the heavyweight title. Corbett announced his return to the ring shortly thereafter, at which time the championship claims of Maher, Fitzsimmons, and Sharkey were for the most part dismissed. Sharkey's title claims lapsed when he was defeated by Jeffries in May 1898.
6. Jeffries announced his retirement, relinquishing the title and promoting a match between Marvin Hart and Jack Root for the championship. Jeffries returned to the ring to challenge Jack Johnson.
7. The British National Sporting Club withdrew its recognition of Johnson as champion when he refused to defend his title against the British champion William "Iron" Hague. The NSC matched Hague with Canadian Sam Langford for its title on May 24, 1909. Langford won via fourth-round knockout but never pursued a championship claim.
8. Schmeling earned championship recognition by defeating Jack Sharkey by controversial disqualification. The New York State Athletic Commission withdrew its recognition of Schmeling when he refused to grant Sharkey an immediate rematch. The NYSAC would restore Schmeling to championship status on January 22, 1932, after agreeing to face Sharkey later that year.
9. In late 1934, the International Boxing Union (IBU) ordered Baer to defend his title against European champion Pierre Charles of Belgium. When Baer refused, the IBU sanctioned a bout between Charles and American George Godfrey for their title on October 2, 1935. Godfrey won via fifteen-round decision but never pursued a championship claim. The IBU ultimately recognized Baer's successor James J. Braddock as champion.
10. Two months after Louis' retirement announcement, the International Boxing Union sanctioned a bout between British champion Bruce Woodcock and American Lee Savold for its version of the title. The bout was not staged until June 1950, however, due to delays caused by injuries suffered by Woodcock in an automobile accident. Meanwhile, Ezzard Charles defeated Jersey Joe Walcott to win the vacant National Boxing Association championship title. Savold defeated Woodcock in four rounds to win the IBU title, while Charles gained New York State Athletic Commission recognition and wide public acclaim as champion upon defeating former champion Joe Louis in September 1950. On June 15, 1951, Joe Louis defeated Savold via sixth-round knockout, after which the IBU withdrew its recognition of Savold and proclaimed Ezzard Charles as champion.
11. Following Marciano's retirement, Patterson was matched against Tommy "Hurricane" Jackson in a championship eliminator on June 8, 1956. Winning via controversial split decision, Patterson then faced light heavyweight titleholder Archie Moore for the vacant title. Upon defeating Moore, Patterson fought (and defeated) Jackson a second time on July 29, 1957.
12. The World Boxing Association withdrew their championship recognition of Clay (by then known as Muhammad Ali) upon agreeing to an immediate rematch against former champion Sonny Liston, in violation of WBA rules. The newly founded World Boxing Council and other sanctioning groups continued to recognize Ali as champion.
13. The World Boxing Association, World Boxing Council, New York State Athletic Commission and others withdrew their championship recognition of Ali following his refusal to be inducted into the United States Army subsequent to his conscription.
14. To fill its vacant championship title, the World Boxing Association organized a single-elimination tournament involving eight of their ranked contenders (Joe Frazier, who was ranked No. 2, declined to participate): Oscar Bonavena, Jimmy Ellis, Leotis Martin, Karl Mildenberger, two-time former champion Floyd Patterson, Jerry Quarry, Thad Spencer, and former WBA champion Ernie Terrell. In first round matches, Ellis defeated Martin, Quarry defeated Patterson, Spencer defeated Terrell, and Bonavena defeated Mildenberger. In the semi-finals, Ellis defeated Bonavena while Quarry defeated Spencer; and Ellis defeated Quarry for the championship title. Frazier, meanwhile, was matched against Buster Mathis for a championship recognized by the New York State Athletic Commission together with the commissions of Illinois, Maine, Massachusetts and Pennsylvania. Similar "world" championship recognition was bestowed upon him by the Texas Athletic Commission following a victory over Dave Zyglewicz on April 22, 1969.
15. Frazier defeated Ellis to unify the heavyweight championship, but did not gain World public acclaim as champion until defeating Muhammad Ali on March 8, 1971.
16. In an unprecedented move, upon withdrawing its recognition of Leon Spinks as champion, the World Boxing Council immediately recognized Ken Norton as champion, based on an earlier victory over Jimmy Young. As a condition of being named champion, Norton was ordered to face the WBC's new mandatory challenger, Larry Holmes within 120 days.
17. Holmes relinquished his World Boxing Council championship and accepted championship recognition bestowed by the newly organized International Boxing Federation.
18. Following its 1978 precedent, upon withdrawing championship recognition from Riddick Bowe, the World Boxing Council immediately awarded championship recognition to Lennox Lewis, on the basis of his victory in an October 31, 1992 "championship eliminator" over Donovan Ruddock.
19. Following its withdrawal of recognition from George Foreman, the International Boxing Federation sanctioned a December 9, 1995, match between Francois Botha and Axel Schulz for its championship. Botha won the bout by split decision, but the bout result and Botha's championship title were vacated after Botha's post-fight drug test revealed he had taken illegal anabolic steroids. A subsequent bout between Schulz and Michael Moorer was sanctioned for the IBF championship.
20. Upon defeating John Ruiz, Roy Jones Jr. simultaneously held the World Boxing Association's heavyweight and light heavyweight titles. At his request, the WBA suspended its rule prohibiting simultaneous title holding. It later declared Jones its "Champion in Recess," and sanctioned a December 13, 2003, bout between Ruiz and Hasim Rahman for its "interim" championship. Ruiz won the bout. On February 20, 2004, Jones relinquished his heavyweight title to resume boxing as a light heavyweight, at which point Ruiz was elevated to full championship recognition. On April 30, 2005, Ruiz was defeated by James Toney in a championship defense, but post-fight drug testing determined Toney had taken Nandrolone, an anabolic steroid. The bout's result was subsequently changed to a "no contest," whereupon the WBA reinstated Ruiz as champion.
21. Following repeated injuries to champion Vitali Klitschko, the World Boxing Council sanctioned an August 13, 2005, bout between Hasim Rahman and Monte Barrett for its "interim" championship. Rahman won the bout, and when Klitschko relinquished his title three months later, the WBC elevated Rahman to full championship recognition.
22. Following repeated injuries which prevented him from defending his title, the World Boxing Association designated Chagaev a "Champion in Recess," sanctioning an August 30, 2008 bout between former champions John Ruiz and Nikolai Valuev for its primary title; a bout won by Valuev. Upon his recovery however, Chagaev opted to face Wladimir Klitschko rather than Valuev, whereupon the WBA withdrew the "Champion in Recess" status.
23. The World Boxing Association modified its championship structure, creating a new "Super Champion" status to be awarded to champions who hold multiple titles simultaneously. Now subordinated to this was the status of "World Champion," commonly referred to as the "Regular" champion. The organization then sanctioned a bout between Povetkin and former champion Ruslan Chagaev for this "regular" title. Povetkin's reign as the WBA's "regular champion" ended upon a loss to "Super Champion" Wladimir Klitschko, at which point the "regular" title was vacant.
24. Browne defeated Ruslan Chagaev for the World Boxing Association's "regular" championship title, but Browne subsequently tested positive for Clenbuterol, a banned substance. Following confirmation of the positive result, the WBA withdrew its recognition of Browne's "regular" championship.
25. On October 29, 1877, a fight between British fighters Tom Allen and Tompkin Gilbert at the Sadler's Wells Theatre, London was billed as for the World heavyweight title under Marquess of Queensberry Rules. Allen won in seven rounds.
26. Bryan was due to fight Mahmoud Charr on January 29, 2021, for the WBA Regular championship, but Charr was unable to attain the right visa to come to the US, where the fight was to be held. Due to the long period of inactivity, Charr was stripped of the title and Bryan fought Bermane Stiverne for the now vacant title instead.

== List of combined reigns ==
As of July 1, 2026.

Keys:

Active title reign
Reign has ended
WBO heavyweight title bouts before August 23, 1997 are not included

Pos.	Name	Combined reign	Days as champion	Number of reigns	Title recognition	Cumulative title wins	Opponents beaten
1.	Wladimir Klitschko	12 years, 0 months, 0 days	4 382	2	WBA, IBF, WBO	25	23
2.	Joe Louis	11 years, 8 months, 8 days	4 270	1	NYSAC, NBA	27	22
3.	Muhammad Ali	9 years, 1 month, 15 days	3 333	3	NYSAC, WBA, WBC	22	21
4.	Lennox Lewis	8 years, 5 months, 13 days	3 086	3	WBA, WBC, IBF	15	15
5.	Vitali Klitschko	7 years, 5 months, 28 days	2 735	3	WBC, WBO	15	15
6.	Larry Holmes	7 years, 3 months, 12 days	2 661	1	WBC, IBF	20	20
7.	Jack Dempsey	7 years, 2 months, 19 days	2 638	1	NYSAC, NBA	6	6
8.	John L. Sullivan	7 years, 0 months, 10 days	2 566	1	Universal	5	5
9.	Jack Johnson	6 years, 3 months, 11 days	2 292	1	Universal	6	6
10.	Evander Holyfield	6 years, 1 month, 1 day	2 223	4	WBA, WBC, IBF	11	10
11.	James J. Jeffries	5 years, 11 months, 4 days	2 156	1	Universal	8	6
12.	Tyson Fury	5 years, 1 month, 12 days	1 866	2	WBA, WBC, IBF, WBO	5	4
13.	Deontay Wilder	5 years, 1 month, 5 days	1 859	1	WBC	10	8
14.	Anthony Joshua	4 years, 11 months, 17 days	1 806	2	WBA, IBF, WBO	9	9
15.	Joe Frazier	4 years, 10 months, 18 days	1 785	1	NYSAC, WBA, WBC	10	10
16.	Floyd Patterson	4 years, 10 months, 0 days	1 765	2	NYSAC, NBA	8	7
17.	Oleksandr Usyk	4 years, 9 months, 1 day	1 735	1	WBA, WBC, IBF, WBO	7	4
18.	James J. Corbett	4 years, 6 months, 10 days	1 652	1	Universal	2	2
19.	Jess Willard	4 years, 2 months, 29 days	1 551	1	Universal	2	2
20.	Chris Byrd	3 years, 10 months, 22 days	1 421	2	IBF, WBO	5	5

== List of individual reigns ==
The list includes The Ring belt. Career total time as champion (for multiple time champions) does not apply.

As of July 1, 2026.

Keys:

Active Title Reign
Reign has ended
The WBO heavyweight title bouts before August 1997 are not included

Pos.	Name	Title Reign	Title recognition	Successful Defenses	Opponents beaten
1.	Joe Louis	11 years, 8 months, 8 days	Universal	26	21
2.	Wladimir Klitschko	9 years, 7 months and 6 days	IBF (+WBA, WBO, The Ring)	18	17
3.	Larry Holmes	7 years, 3 months, 12 days	WBC-to-IBF (+The Ring)	19	19
4.	Jack Dempsey	7 years, 2 months, 19 days	Universal	5	5
5.	John L. Sullivan	7 years, 0 months, 9 days	Universal	5	5
6.	Jack Johnson	6 years, 3 months, 10 days	Universal	6	6
7.	Muhammad Ali	5 years, 11 months, 9 days	The Ring, (+WBA, WBC stripped)	9	9
8.	James J. Jeffries	5 years, 11 months, 4 days	Universal	7	6
9.	Vitali Klitschko	5 years, 2 months, 4 days	WBC	9	9
10.	Deontay Wilder	5 years, 1 month, 5 days	WBC	10	8
11.	Joe Frazier	4 years, 10 months, 18 days	NYSAC (+WBA, WBC)	9	9
12.	Oleksandr Usyk	5 years, 1 month and 23 days	WBA (+WBC, IBF stripped, WBO, The Ring)	6	4
13.	James J. Corbett	4 years, 6 months, 10 days	Universal	1	1
14.	Jess Willard	4 years, 2 months, 29 days	Universal	1	1
15.	Tyson Fury	4 years, 2 months, 26 days	WBC (+The Ring)	3	3
16.	Lennox Lewis	4 years, 2 months, 15 days	WBC (+IBF, WBA stripped, The Ring)	9	8
17.	Rocky Marciano	3 years, 11 months, 29 days	Universal	6	5
18.	Chris Byrd	3 years, 4 months, 8 days	IBF	4	4
19.	Mike Tyson	3 years, 2 months, 20 days	WBC (+WBA, IBF, The Ring)	9	9
20.	Anthony Joshua	3 years, 1 month and 23 days	IBF (+WBA, WBO)	6	6

== By country ==
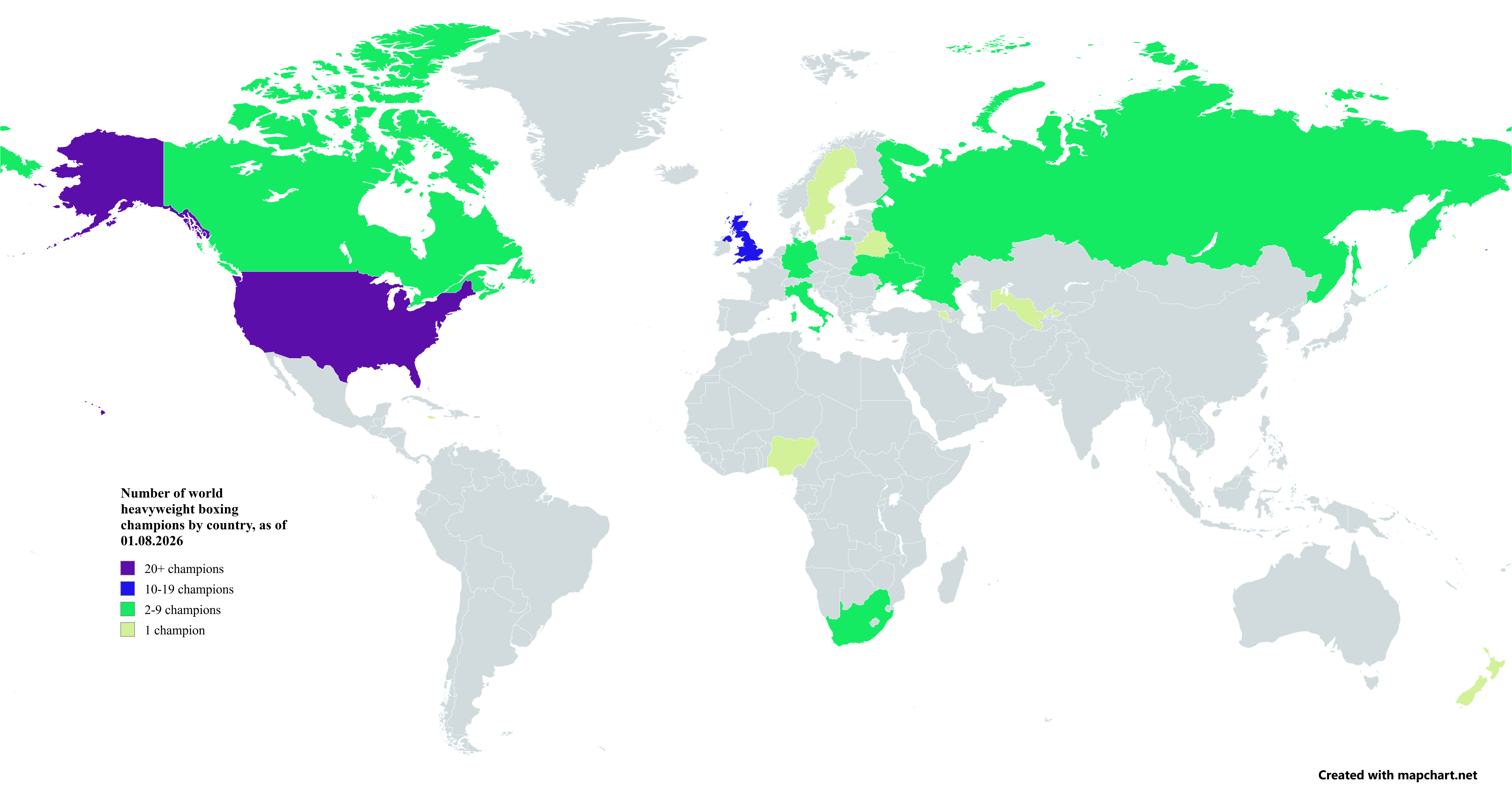
Map of countries, number of current and former world heavyweight boxing champions per country (as of 14 September 2026). Note: interim titles and secondary belts are not included

Country	Total	Boxers by Name
United States	53	John L. Sullivan, James J. Corbett, James J. Jeffries, Marvin Hart, Jack Johnson, Jess Willard, Jack Dempsey, Gene Tunney, Jack Sharkey, Max Baer, James J. Braddock, Joe Louis, Ezzard Charles, Jersey Joe Walcott, Rocky Marciano, Floyd Patterson, Sonny Liston, Muhammad Ali, Ernie Terrell, Joe Frazier, Jimmy Ellis, George Foreman, Leon Spinks, Ken Norton, Larry Holmes, John Tate, Mike Weaver, Michael Dokes, Tim Witherspoon, Pinklon Thomas, Greg Page, Tony Tubbs, Michael Spinks, Mike Tyson, James Smith, Tony Tucker, Buster Douglas, Evander Holyfield, Ray Mercer, Michael Moorer, Riddick Bowe, Tommy Morrison, Oliver McCall, Bruce Seldon, Chris Byrd, John Ruiz, Hasim Rahman, Roy Jones Jr., Lamon Brewster, Shannon Briggs, Deontay Wilder, Charles Martin, Andy Ruiz Jr.
United Kingdom	11	Bob Fitzsimmons, Lennox Lewis*, Michael Bentt*, Herbie Hide, Frank Bruno, Henry Akinwande, David Haye, Tyson Fury, Anthony Joshua, Daniel Dubois, Fabio Wardley
Russia	4	Nikolai Valuev, Oleg Maskaev*, Sultan Ibragimov, Murat Gassiev*
Ukraine	3	Vitali Klitschko, Wladimir Klitschko, Oleksandr Usyk
Canada	2	Tommy Burns, Lennox Lewis*
Germany	2	Max Schmeling, Agit Kabayel
Italy	2	Primo Carnera, Francesco Damiani
South Africa	2	Gerrie Coetzee, Corrie Sanders
Armenia	1	Murat Gassiev*
Belarus	1	Siarhei Liakhovich
Croatia	1	Filip Hrgović
Jamaica	1	Trevor Berbick*
Haiti	1	Bermane Stiverne*
New Zealand	1	Joseph Parker*
Nigeria	1	Samuel Peter
Samoa	1	Joseph Parker*
Sweden	1	Ingemar Johansson
Uzbekistan	1	Ruslan Chagaev

== See also ==
- World heavyweight boxing championship records and statistics
- List of Olympic medalists in heavyweight boxing
- List of WBA heavyweight world champions
- List of WBA female heavyweight world champions
- List of WBC heavyweight world champions
- List of WBC female heavyweight world champions
- List of IBF heavyweight world champions
- List of IBF female heavyweight world champions
- List of WBO heavyweight world champions
- List of WBO female heavyweight world champions
- List of NYSAC heavyweight world champions
- List of British world boxing champions

== Sources ==
- Arnold, Peter (1989). Encyclopedia of Boxing. London: WH Smith Books. ISBN 1-85435-200-8.
- Boxing Title Fights
- NBA World Heavyweight Champion - BoxRec
- NYSAC World Heavyweight Champion – BoxRec
- The BoxRec – Boxing's Official Record Keeper
- The BoxRec Wiki Encyclopedia
- The Boxing Register: International Boxing Hall Of Fame Official Record Book (archive)
