= George Arias (boxer) =

Brazilian boxer (born 1974)

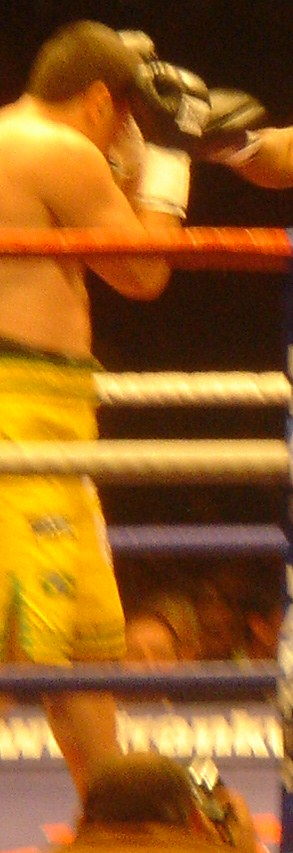

Personal information
- Born: 21 April 1974 (age 52) São Paulo, Brazil
- Height: 1.82 m (5 ft 11.5 in)
- Weight: Heavyweight

Boxing career
- Stance: Orthodox

Boxing record
- Total fights: 72
- Wins: 56
- Win by KO: 42
- Losses: 16

George Arias (born 21 April 1974) is a Brazilian former professional boxer who competed from 1996 to 2016. He challenged once for the WBO cruiserweight title in 2001.

== Professional career ==
Arias faced boxers such as Kubrat Pulev, Hughie Fury, Taras Bidenko, Owen Beck, Sinan Şamil Sam and Juan Carlos Gomez. All but Gomez failed to stop Arias.

He started his career at cruiserweight, having a short against WBO cruiserweight champion Johnny Nelson in January 2001 losing by a lopsided unanimous decision.

He fought on the undercard of an IBF title match between Chris Byrd vs Evander Holyfield on December 14, 2002, against former NABF champion Fres Oquendo, losing by 11th-round TKO.

On 6 September 2008, Arias faced former Olympic Gold medalist Audley Harrison at the MEN Arena in Manchester, live on Sky Box Office, on the undercard of Amir Khan vs. Breidis Prescott. but lost on points 94 to 98. He only had a 4-day notice to the bout after Martin Rogan had pulled out with injury.

Arias is a former Brazilian and South American heavyweight title holder. As of 2009 he was preparing himself to make an assault toward the world title but this time with the professional help of investors, however this never came to pass and he never received a shot at a world heavyweight title. He works as a personal trainer.

He retired after a 2nd-round TKO defeat at the hand of Zhang Junlong.

== Professional boxing record ==
72 fights	56 wins	16 losses
By knockout	42	5
By decision	14	11

No.	Result	Record	Opponent	Type	Round, time	Date	Location	Notes
72	Loss	56–16	Zhang Junlong	TKO	2 (12), 0:47	11 Apr 2016	Sport Hall, Jinghong, China	For vacant WBA Oceania heavyweight title
71	Loss	56–15	Carlos Takam	UD	8	28 Nov 2015	Palasport Le Cupole, Turin, Italy	
70	Loss	56–14	Kubrat Pulev	UD	8	17 Oct 2015	Max-Schmeling-Halle, Berlin, Germany	
69	Loss	56–13	Hughie Fury	PTS	10	25 Jul 2015	Derby Arena, Derby, England	
68	Win	56–12	Leonardo De Moura	UD	8	11 May 2015	Ginásio de Esportes, Pacaembu, Brazil	Retained Brazilian heavyweight Title
67	Loss	55–12	Denis Boytsov	UD	8	6 Dec 2014	Large EWE Arena, Oldenburg, Germany	
66	Win	55–11	Mateus Roberto Osorio	KO	3 (10), 1:46	7 Jun 2014	Ginásio Municipal, Capivari, Brazil	Retained Brazilian heavyweight title
65	Win	54–11	Adilson Da Silva Santos	KO	8 (10)	10 May 2014	Ginasio Rebouças, Santos, Brazil	
64	Win	53–11	Paulo Ramos	KO	1 (10)	4 May 2013	Itatiba, Brazil	Retained Brazilian heavyweight title
63	Win	52–11	Adilson Da Silva Santos	KO	2 (10), 2:59	19 Jan 2013	Adler Max Vinhedo, Itatiba, Brazil	Retained Brazilian heavyweight title
62	Win	51–11	Cesar Estigarribia Canete	TKO	1 (10), 1:53	29 Jun 2012	Sociedade Esportiva Palmeiras, São Paulo, Brazil	
61	Win	50–11	Bruno Lucas Moreira de Oliveira	TKO	1 (10), 2:12	27 Mar 2012	Ginasio Baby Barione, São Paulo, Brazil	Won Brazilian heavyweight title
60	Win	49–11	Lisandro Ezequiel Diaz	TKO	2 (12), 2:50	18 Mar 2011	Buenos Aires, Argentina	Retained South American heavyweight Title
59	Win	48–11	Roberto Martins	RTD	5 (10), 0:04	27 Nov 2010	Itatiba, Brazil	Retained Brazilian heavyweight title
58	Win	47–11	Emilio Ezequiel Zarate	DQ	10 (12), 2:10	20 Nov 2010	São Paulo, Brazil	Retained South American heavyweight title
57	Win	46–11	Saul Farah	RTD	2 (12), 0:40	31 Jul 2010	São Paulo, Brazil	Retained South American heavyweight title
56	Win	45–11	Kleber Giovanne Souza Pereira	TKO	2 (10), 0:50	10 Apr 2010	Itatiba, Brazil	Retained Brazilian heavyweight title
55	Win	44–11	Ademar Leonardo Correa	KO	2 (10), 2:16	12 Dec 2009	Ibitinga, Brazil	Won vacant Brazilian heavyweight title
54	Win	43–11	Jairo Kusunoki	UD	12	21 Mar 2009	Itatiba, Brazil	Retained South American heavyweight title
53	Win	42–11	Cesar Gustavo Acevedo	TKO	4 (12), 1:32	8 Nov 2008	São Paulo, Brazil	Won South American heavyweight title
52	Loss	41–11	Audley Harrison	PTS	10	6 Sep 2008	MEN Arena, Manchester, England	
51	Loss	41–10	Taras Bydenko	UD	12	20 Oct 2007	Halle (Westfalen), Germany	For WBA Intercontinental heavyweight title
50	Win	41–9	Renilson Dos Santos	KO	1 (10), 1:11	31 Aug 2007	Ginasio Municipal de Esportes, Santa Rita do Passa Quatro, Brazil	Retained Brazilian heavyweight title
49	Win	40–9	Mauro Aparecido Gomes	KO	2 (10)	3 Aug 2007	Ribeirão Bonito, Brazil	Retained Brazilian heavyweight title
48	Win	39–9	Gilton Dos Santos	RTD	5 (10), 0:01	21 Apr 2007	São Paulo, Brazil	Won vacant Brazilian heavyweight title; Won vacant WBC Mundo Hispano Intercontinental heavyweight title
47	Win	38–9	Valtencir Franca	TKO	2 (10)	23 Sep 2006	Itatiba, Brazil	
46	Loss	37–9	Sinan Şamil Sam	UD	12	8 Apr 2006	Kiel, Germany	For vacant WBC International heavyweight Title
45	Win	37–8	Victor Luis Ferreira	TKO	3 (10)	25 Nov 2005	Indaiatuba, Brazil	
44	Win	36–8	Robson Bispo Piza	KO	2 (10), 2:00	29 Oct 2005	Cajamar, Brazil	Retained Brazilian heavyweight title
43	Win	35–8	Luiz Delmino	TKO	2 (10), 1:27	24 Sep 2005	Monte Mor, Brazil	Won vacant Brazilian heavyweight title
42	Loss	34–8	Juan Carlos Gomez	KO	4 (8), 2:27	28 May 2005	Stuttgart, Germany	
41	Win	34–7	Steffen Nielsen	KO	3 (8), 1:59	15 Apr 2005	Copenhagen, Denmark	
40	Win	33–7	Daniel Silva Frank	KO	3 (10), 2:48	7 Dec 2004	São Paulo, Brazil	Retained Brazilian heavyweight title
39	Win	32–7	Luiz Aparecido Dos Santos	SD	10	27 Nov 2003	Santana de Parnaíba, Brazil	Won vacant Brazilian heavyweight title
38	Loss	31–7	Owen Beck	UD	12	20 Sep 2003	Uncasville, Connecticut, U.S.	For vacant WBA Fedelatin heavyweight title
37	Loss	31–6	Fabrice Tiozzo	UD	8	8 Mar 2003	Marseille, France	
36	Loss	31–5	Fres Oquendo	TKO	11 (12)	14 Dec 2002	Atlantic City, New Jersey, U.S.	For vacant WBA Fedelatin heavyweight title
35	Win	31–4	Daniel Silva Frank	PTS	10	30 Oct 2001	São Paulo, Brazil	Retained Brazilian heavyweight title
34	Win	30–4	Gilton Dos Santos	TKO	5 (10)	22 Mar 2001	São Paulo, Brazil	Retained Brazilian heavyweight title
33	Loss	29–4	Johnny Nelson	UD	12	27 Jan 2001	York Hall, London, England	For WBO cruiserweight title
32	Loss	29–3	Marcelo Fabian Dominguez	UD	10	4 Nov 2000	Ituzaingó, Argentina	
31	Win	29–2	Edegar Da Silva	TKO	4 (10), 2:20	15 Aug 2000	São Paulo, Brazil	
30	Win	28–2	Laerte Resende	TKO	6 (10)	20 Jun 2000	São Paulo, Brazil	Retained Brazilian heavyweight title
29	Win	27–2	Pedro Daniel Franco	UD	12	25 Apr 2000	São Paulo, Brazil	Won vacant WBA Fedelatin heavyweight title
28	Win	26–2	Marcos Celestino	KO	4 (10)	4 Apr 2000	São Paulo, Brazil	Retained Brazilian heavyweight title
27	Win	25–2	Laerte Resende	TKO	4 (10)	29 Feb 2000	São Paulo, Brazil	Retained Brazilian heavyweight title
26	Win	24–2	Egidio Amaro Da Costa	KO	2 (10)	8 Feb 2000	São Paulo, Brazil	Retained Brazilian heavyweight title
25	Win	23–2	Egidio Amaro Da Costa	KO	2 (10)	23 Dec 1999	São Paulo, Brazil	Retained Brazilian heavyweight title
24	Win	22–2	Carlos Barcelete	TKO	6 (12)	31 Aug 1999	São Paulo, Brazil	Retained Brazilian heavyweight title
23	Loss	21–2	Oscar Angel Gomez	TKO	10 (12)	9 Jul 1999	Puerto San Julian, Argentina	For WBO Latino cruiserweight title; Lost South American cruiserweight title
22	Win	21–1	Ivan Aparecido Rosa	PTS	10	22 Jun 1999	São Paulo, Brazil	Retained Brazilian heavyweight title
21	Loss	20–1	Oscar Angel Gomez	KO	8 (12), 2:50	30 Mar 1999	São Paulo, Brazil	Lost WBO Latino cruiserweight title
20	Win	20–0	Marcos Celestino	TKO	5 (10)	2 Feb 1999	São Paulo, Brazil	Retained Brazilian heavyweight title
19	Win	19–0	Elmo Mamede De Carvalho	PTS	10	1 Dec 1998	São Paulo, Brazil	Retained Brazilian heavyweight title
18	Win	18–0	Miguel Angel Medina Burgos	PTS	12	6 Oct 1998	São Paulo, Brazil	Retained WBO Latino cruiserweight title; Won vacant South American cruiserweight title
17	Win	17–0	Elmo Mamede De Carvalho	TKO	9 (10)	8 Sep 1998	São Paulo, Brazil	Won Brazilian heavyweight title
16	Win	16–0	Luiz Augusto Ferreira	UD	10	30 Jun 1998	São Paulo, Brazil	Won vacant Brazilian cruiserweight title
15	Win	15–0	Josemir De Oliveira	TKO	4 (10)	2 Jun 1998	São Paulo, Brazil	
14	Win	14–0	Miguel Angel Antonio Aguirre	PTS	12	21 Apr 1998	São Paulo, Brazil	Retained WBO Latino cruiserweight title
13	Win	13–0	Genival Galvao	KO	1 (8)	7 Apr 1998	São Paulo, Brazil	
12	Win	12–0	Hernan Raul Perez Ramos	PTS	10	24 Mar 1998	São Paulo, Brazil	
11	Win	11–0	Carlos Alberto Cerdan	PTS	10	24 Jan 1998	Foz do Iguaçu, Brazil	
10	Win	10–0	Sergio Daniel Merani	PTS	12	1 Dec 1997	São Paulo, Brazil	Won vacant WBO Latino cruiserweight title
9	Win	9–0	Antonio Fernando Caldas, Jr.	TKO	6 (8)	28 Oct 1997	São Paulo, Brazil	
8	Win	8–0	Argemiro Antonio Dos Santos	TKO	5 (8)	31 Aug 1997	São Paulo, Brazil	
7	Win	7–0	Carlos Lezcano	KO	3 (8)	12 Jun 1997	São Paulo, Brazil	
6	Win	6–0	Luis Alberto Musa Pereyra	KO	8 (8)	27 May 1997	São Paulo, Brazil	
5	Win	5–0	Victor Luis Britos Samudio	KO	5 (6)	15 Apr 1997	São Paulo, Brazil	
4	Win	4–0	Robson Silva dos Santos	KO	2 (6)	4 Mar 1997	São Paulo, Brazil	
3	Win	3–0	Silvano De Castro	TKO	5 (6)	4 Feb 1997	São Paulo, Brazil	
2	Win	2–0	Fernando Gonzaga	UD	4	12 Nov 1996	São Paulo, Brazil	
1	Win	1–0	Sergio Lopez	KO	1 (4)	15 Oct 1996	São Paulo, Brazil	
