= Chris Byrd vs. Wladimir Klitschko II =

Boxing competition

Alles Oder Nichts
- Date: 22 April 2006
- Venue: SAP Arena, Mannheim, Baden-Württemberg, Germany
- Title(s) on the line: IBF and IBO heavyweight titles

Tale of the tape
Boxer	Chris Byrd	Wladimir Klitschko
Nickname	Rapid Fire	Dr. Steelhammer
Hometown	Flint, Michigan, U.S.	Kyiv, Ukraine
Pre-fight record	39–2–1 (20 KO)	45–3 (40 KO)
Age	35 years, 8 months	30 years
Height	6 ft 2 in (188 cm)	6 ft 6 in (198 cm)
Weight	213 1/2 lb (97 kg)	241 lb (109 kg)
Style	Southpaw	Orthodox
Recognition	IBF; Heavyweight Champion; The Ring; No. 1 Ranked Heavyweight	IBF; No. 1 Ranked Heavyweight; The Ring; No. 8 Ranked Heavyweight

Result
- Klitschko defeated Byrd by 7th round TKO

Chris Byrd vs. Wladimir Klitschko II, billed as Alles Oder Nichts (German for "All or Nothing"), was a professional boxing match contested on 22 April 2006 for the IBF and vacant IBO heavyweight championship.

== Background ==
After beating Evander Holyfield in 2002 to win the IBF title, Byrd has successfully defended the IBF belt four times against Fres Oquendo, Andrew Golota, Jameel McCline, and DaVarryl Williamson. At the time he was ranked as the best Heavyweight in the world by Ring magazine (Wladimir Klitschko was 8th).

Klitschko, appearing in his first major world title bout, had won four fights in his comeback from his shock defeat to Lamon Brewster while trying to regain the WBO title he had lost to Corrie Sanders in 2003.

The two men had fought six years earlier with Wladimir winning via a unanimous decision.

== The fight ==
The fight was a one sided affair with Klitschko dominating Byrd before Klitschko's right hook finished off the American 41 seconds into round 7, the second time Byrd was floored in the fight.

== Aftermath ==
Byrd had originally planned to fight then reigning WBA champion Nicolai Valuev; he would instead go on to lose to Alexander Povetkin before briefly returning to the light heavyweight division and ultimately retiring in 2010 with the record of 41–5–1.

Klitschko held the IBF title for a record-breaking 3,507 days before his defeat at the hands of Tyson Fury in November 2015.

This fight would mark the fourth time trainer Emanuel Steward guided a fighter to a Heavyweight title, after Evander Holyfield, Oliver McCall and Lennox Lewis.

== Undercard ==
Confirmed bouts:

Winner	Loser	Weight division/title belt(s) disputed	Result
(Germany) Sebastian Sylvester	(United Kingdom) Steven Bendall	EBU Middleweight Title	3rd round TKO.
(Ukraine) Oleg Platov	(Republic of Ireland) Colin Kenna	Heavyweight (8 rounds)	5th round TKO.
(Armenia) Alexander Abraham	(Germany) Mazen Girke	Super Welterweight (8 rounds)	Unanimous decision.
(Germany) Timo Hoffmann	(Ghana) Abraham Okine	Heavyweight (8 rounds)	Unanimous decision.
(Germany) Rene Dettweiler	(Czech Republic) Ondřej Pála	Heavyweight (8 rounds)	Unanimous decision.
(Russia) Alexander Povetkin	(Nigeria) Friday Ahunanya	Heavyweight (6 rounds)	Unanimous decision.
(Republic of Ireland) Andy Lee	(Germany) Wassim Khalil	Middleweight (6 rounds)	5th round TKO.

== Broadcasting ==
Country	Broadcaster
Germany	Das Erste
United States	HBO

Preceded by vs. DaVarryl Williamson	Chris Byrd's bouts 22 April 2006	Succeeded by vs. Paul Marinaccio
Preceded by vs. Samuel Peter	Wladimir Klitschko's bouts 22 April 2006	Succeeded by vs. Calvin Brock
