= John Ruiz vs. Andrew Golota =

Boxing event

Struggle For Supremacy
- Date: November 13, 2004
- Venue: Madison Square Garden, New York City, New York, U.S.
- Title(s) on the line: WBA Heavyweight Championship

Tale of the tape
Boxer	(United States) John Ruiz	(Poland) Andrew Golota
Nickname	"The Quietman"	"The Powerful Pole"
Hometown	Chelsea, Massachusetts, US	Warsaw, Masovian, Poland
Pre-fight record	40–5–1 (28 KO)	38–4–1 (1) (32 KO)
Age	32 years, 10 months	36 years, 10 months
Height	6 ft 1 in (185 cm)	6 ft 4 in (193 cm)
Weight	239 lb (108 kg)	238 lb (108 kg)
Style	Orthodox	Orthodox
Recognition	WBA; Heavyweight Champion; The Ring; No. 2 Ranked Heavyweight	WBA; No. 5 Ranked Heavyweight; The Ring; No. 6 Ranked Heavyweight

Result
- Ruiz defeats Golota by Unanimous Decision

John Ruiz vs. Andrew Golota, billed as Struggle For Supremacy (Night of the Heavyweights), was a professional boxing match contested on November 13, 2004, for the WBA Heavyweight championship.

== Background ==
On an 17 April bill at Madison Square Garden, John Ruiz & Chris Byrd successfully defence both of their versions of the heavyweight title. Ruiz by stopping Fres Oquendo and Byrd via a draw with Andrew Golota. It was expected that Byrd would have a rematch with Golota, however instead he was matched with close friend Jameel McCline, and Golota faced Ruiz.

Don King claimed at a pre fight press conference that the winners of the two heavyweight title bouts would advance in an elimination tournament to unify the division.

== The fights ==
=== Undercard ===
On the first of the televised bouts, Evander Holyfield (ranked at 11th by the WBA) lost a lopsided Unanimous Decision against Larry Donald. This was followed by Hasim Rahman (WBA:1st, WBC/WBO:2nd, IBF:3rd & The Ring:4th) facing Kali Meehan (WBC:5th, IBF:10th & WBA:14th) who only two months earlier had lost a split decision to WBO titleholder Lamon Brewster, having broken Brewster's jaw in the process. Rahman dominated Meehan, landing many heavy shots, leading Meehan's corner to pull him out after 4 rounds. The HBO's Jim Lampley and Roy Jones Jr. agreed that it was the best Rahman had looked since his victory over Lennox Lewis more than three years earlier. Promoter Don King speaking to Larry Merchant in the ring after the bout said that he would prefer to match Rahman with Vitali Klitschko over either Ruiz or Byrd.

=== Byrd vs. McCline ===
Struggle For Supremacy: Chris Byrd vs. Jameel McCline
- Title(s) on the line: IBF Heavyweight Championship

Tale of the tape
Boxer	(United States) Chris Byrd	(United States) Jameel McCline
Nickname	"Rapid Fire"	"Big Time"
Hometown	Flint, Michigan	New York City, New York
Pre-fight record	37–2–1 (20 KO)	31–3–3 (19 KO)
Age	34 years, 2 months	34 years, 5 months
Height	6 ft 1 1/2 in (187 cm)	6 ft 6 in (198 cm)
Weight	214 lb (97 kg)	270 lb (122 kg)
Style	Southpaw	Orthodox
Recognition	IBF; Heavyweight Champion; The Ring; No. 1 Ranked Heavyweight	IBF; No. 1 Ranked Heavyweight; The Ring; No. 8 Ranked Heavyweight

Result
- Byrd defeats McCline by Split Decision

McCline dropped Byrd with a right hand in the second round. Byrd, however come on strong in the later rounds, scoring with quick inside combinations. At the end of 12 entertaining rounds, one judge scored the bout for McCline 114–112, while the other two scored it 115–112 and 114–113 for Byrd, giving him a split decision victory. The Associated Press scored it 115–113 for Byrd. HBO's Harold Lederman had the bout scored as 114–112 for Byrd.

Preceded by vs. Andrew Golota	Chris Byrd's bouts November 13, 2004	Succeeded by vs. DaVarryl Williamson
Preceded by vs. Wayne Llewellyn	Jameel McCline's bouts November 13, 2004	Succeeded by vs. Calvin Brock

=== Main Event ===
Ruiz was dropped by a counter right from Golota late in the second round, he beat the count but was dropped again with a right to the top of the head before the end of the round. Ruiz was also deducted a point for hitting Golota on the back of the head in the fourth round. Ruiz's trainer, Norman Stone spent much of bout loudly criticizing referee Randy Neumann. After pausing the bout in the eight round for Stone to fix some loose tape on Ruiz's glove, Stone was heard to audibly call Neumann a "Fucking jerk off". This prompted Neumann to expel Stone from the corner and send him back to the dressing room, something that HBO's Harold Lederman stated was unprecedented in his memory. Ruiz would come on strong late and at the end of 12 rounds, would win a close but unanimous decision, with two judges scoring the bout 114–111 and third 113–112.

The Associated Press had scored the bout for Golota 113–112 as had Lederman.

== Aftermath ==
Despite his desire for a rematch with Byrd, it be announced in December that Golota would be matched against WBO belt holder Lamon Brewster, while Ruiz would face James Toney. Three days after his loss against Donald, Holyfield would be placed indefinite medical suspension by the New York State Athletic Commission, with chairman Ron Stevens saying "To my practiced mind, Holyfield shouldn't be fighting any more. It's the responsibility of the state athletic commission to save a boxer from himself."

== Undercard ==
Confirmed bouts:

Winner	Loser	Weight division/title belt(s) disputed	Result
(United States) Chris Byrd	(United States) Jameel McCline	IBF World Heavyweight title	Split Decision.
(United States) Hasim Rahman	(Australia) Kali Meehan	WBC and IBF Heavyweight Title Eliminator	4th-round RTD.
(United States) Larry Donald	(United States) Evander Holyfield	NABC Heavyweight title	Unanimous Decision.
Non-TV bouts
(United States) DaVarryl Williamson	(United States) Oliver McCall	Heavyweight (10 rounds)	Unanimous Decision.
(United States) Aaron Mitchell	(United States) Carlton Holland	Super Middleweight (10 rounds)	5th-round KO.
(United States) Yuri Foreman	(United States) Shakir Ashanti	Super Welterweight (6 rounds)	2nd-round TKO.
(Ukraine) Oleksandr Harashchenko	(United States) Ronald Boddie	Light Heavyweight (6 rounds)	Unanimous Decision.
(United States) Marcus Johnson	(United States) Mateen Haleem	Light Heavyweight (4 rounds)	3rd-round TKO.
(United States) Thomas McCuiston	(United States) Samuel Rohena	Bantamweight (4 rounds)	Unanimous Decision.

== Broadcasting ==
Country	Broadcaster
Canada	Viewers Choice
Poland	TVN
United States	HBO

Preceded by vs. Fres Oquendo	John Ruiz's bouts November 13, 2004	Succeeded by vs. James Toney
Preceded by vs. Chris Byrd	Andrew Golota's bouts November 13, 2004	Succeeded by vs. Lamon Brewster
