= Aaron Mitchell =

Aaron Mitchell may refer to:

- Aaron Mitchell (murderer) (1930–1967), executed for murdering a police officer in Sacramento in 1963
- Aaron Mitchell (American football) (born 1956), former professional American football player
- Aaron Mitchell (boxer) (born 1969), American middleweight boxer
