= Chris Byrd vs. Andrew Golota =

Boxing match

The Next Era Of Heavyweights
- Date: April 17, 2004
- Venue: Madison Square Garden, New York City, New York, U.S.
- Title on the line: IBF Heavyweight Championship

Tale of the tape
Boxer	(United States) Chris Byrd	(Poland) Andrew Golota
Nickname	"Rapid Fire"	"The Powerful Pole"
Hometown	Flint, Michigan, US	Warsaw, Masovian, Poland
Purse	$625,000	$150,000
Pre-fight record	37–2 (20 KO)	38–4 (1) (32 KO)
Age	33 years, 8 months	36 years, 3 months
Height	6 ft 1 1/2 in (187 cm)	6 ft 4 in (193 cm)
Weight	210 1/2 lb (95 kg)	237 1/2 lb (108 kg)
Style	Southpaw	Orthodox
Recognition	IBF; Heavyweight Champion; The Ring; No. 2 Ranked Heavyweight	IBF; No. 13 Ranked Heavyweight

Result
- Split Draw

Chris Byrd vs. Andrew Golota, billed as "The Next Era Of Heavyweights", was a professional boxing match contested on April 17, 2004, for the IBF Heavyweight championship.

== Background ==
Having won the vacant IBF title after getting a clear unanimous decision victory over Evander Holyfield in December 2002, Chris Byrd had only fought once since, defeating Fres Oquendo by a somewhat controversial decision in September 2003. He was nevertheless ranked as the 3rd best heavyweight by Ring Magazine at the end of year, behind only Lennox Lewis and Vitali Klitschko.

Byrd was set to make his second defence against Derrick Jefferson however he pulled out after suffering a cut in a tune-up bout with Julius Long in February, so he was matched up against former world title challenger Andrew Golota. Golota had returned from a near three-year absence in August 2003, scoring low profile TKO wins over journeyman Brian Nix and Terrence Lewis. He had subsequently signed with promoter Don King.

The bout was heavily criticized, given Golota's last notable fight was his bout against Mike Tyson in October 2000 where he pulled out after 3 rounds, with a concussion, a fractured left cheekbone and a herniated disc (although the result was subsequently amended to a no-contest following Tyson testing positive for marijuana). "I can think of 37 guys out there who are more worthy of a title shot" said Pat English, a lawyer for Main Events, who were promoting the IBF's No. 11 heavyweight, Dominick Guinn. "It's not just because I represent Dominick, and it's not because of Golota's past. It's the principle involved."

This was Golota's first return to Madison Square Garden since the infamous riot following his disqualification loss to Riddick Bowe in July 1996.

== The fights ==
=== Undercard ===
On the first of the televised bouts, Wayne Braithwaite defended his WBC cruiserweight championship by a lopsided decision over Louis Azille.

The second bout saw former unified welterweight champion Ricardo Mayorga face late replacement Eric Mitchell. Mayorga had been set to challenge WBA (Regular) welterweight titleholder José Antonio Rivera; however, he weighed in 6 1/2 pounds over the 147-pound limit and Rivera refused to fight him unless he made the limit. Mayorga would get a wide unanimous decision over Mitchell.

=== Ruiz vs. Oquendo ===
The Next Era Of Heavyweights: John Ruiz vs. Fres Oquendo
- Title on the line: WBA Heavyweight Championship

Tale of the tape
Boxer	(United States) John Ruiz	(Puerto Rico) Fres Oquendo
Nickname	"The Quietman"	"The Big O"
Hometown	Chelsea, Massachusetts	San Juan, Puerto Rico
Pre-fight record	39–5–1 (27 KO)	24–2 (15 KO)
Age	32 years, 3 months	31 years
Height	6 ft 1 in (185 cm)	6 ft 2 in (188 cm)
Weight	240 lb (109 kg)	225 1/2 lb (102 kg)
Style	Orthodox	Orthodox
Recognition	WBA; Heavyweight Champion; The Ring; No. 6 Ranked Heavyweight	WBA; No. 12 Ranked Heavyweight; The Ring; No. 8 Ranked Heavyweight

Result
- Ruiz defeats Oquendo by 11th round TKO

Having been promoted to full WBA champion following Roy Jones Jr.'s return to Light heavyweight, John Ruiz signed to the make his first defence against Fres Oquendo, who in his last bout lost a somewhat debatable decision against Chris Byrd. Both had been criticized for fighting dirty throughout their career.

==== The fight ====
The bout was marred by much wrestling and grabbing, which according to one unofficial count led to referee Wayne Kelly having to separate the fighters 62 different times. Both fighters were looking to establish their jab, but the repeated grappling prevented any flow to the bout. The 15,195 person crowd booed consistently from the 1st round onward. In the 11th round Ruiz hurt Oquendo with a right hand that sent him on to the ropes, following up before the referee waved it off. At the time of the stoppage, Ruiz led on two of scorecards 96–94, and the third was even at 95-95.

Speaking afterwards Ruiz said "I want to unify the title, I will fight anyone."

Preceded by vs. Hasim Rahman	John Ruiz's bouts 17 April 2004	Succeeded by vs. Andrew Golota
Preceded by vs. Chris Byrd	Fres Oquendo's bouts 17 April 2004	Succeeded by vs. Daniel Bispo

=== Main Event ===
The bout turned out to be far more competitive than predicted, with Golota the aggressor throughout and Byrd slipping and trying to land counter shots. At the end of 12 rounds Steve Weisfeld scored it 115-113 for Byrd, Tony Paolillo had 115-113 for Golota while Melvina Latham had it 114-114, meaning the bout Byrd kept his title with a split draw. Golota was visibly unhappy with the result saying "I'm glad you feel it was a great fight, but I thought I won the fight". Nevertheless he received praise for his performance and there were calls for a rematch.

== Aftermath ==
A rematch was planned, however Byrd ended up facing his IBF mandatory challenger Jameel McCline, and Golota got a shot against Ruiz for the WBA title on the same card.

== Undercard ==
Confirmed bouts:

== Broadcasting ==
Country	Broadcaster
Canada	Viewers Choice
Mexico	Televisa
Poland	TVN
United Kingdom	British Eurosport
United States	Spike TV/King Vision

Preceded by vs. Fres Oquendo	Chris Byrd's bouts 17 April 2004	Succeeded by vs. Jameel McCline
Preceded by vs. Terrence Lewis	Andrew Golota's bouts 17 April 2004	Succeeded by vs. John Ruiz
