= Evander Holyfield vs. Chris Byrd =

Boxing competition

- Date: December 14, 2002
- Venue: Boardwalk Hall, Atlantic City, New Jersey, U.S.
- Title(s) on the line: vacant IBF heavyweight title

Tale of the tape
Boxer	Evander Holyfield	Chris Byrd
Nickname	The Real Deal	Rapid Fire
Hometown	Atlanta, Georgia, U.S.	Flint, Michigan, U.S.
Purse	$5,000,000	$2,150,000
Pre-fight record	38–5–2 (25 KO)	35–2 (20 KO)
Age	40 years, 1 month	32 years, 3 months
Height	6 ft 2 1/2 in (189 cm)	6 ft 1 1/2 in (187 cm)
Weight	220 lb (100 kg)	214 lb (97 kg)
Style	Orthodox	Southpaw
Recognition	IBF; No. 2 Ranked Heavyweight; 2-division undisputed world champion	IBF; No. 1 Ranked Heavyweight

Result
- Byrd wins via 12-round unanimous decision (117–111, 117–111, 116–112)

Evander Holyfield vs. Chris Byrd was a professional boxing match contested on December 14, 2002 for the vacant IBF heavyweight championship.

== Background ==
Evander Holyfield had lost both his WBA and IBF heavyweight titles to WBC heavyweight champ Lennox Lewis in 1999. However, Lewis would then be stripped of the WBA title after opting to face Michael Grant rather than the WBA's number one contender and mandatory challenger John Ruiz. As a result, Holyfield faced Ruiz on August 12, 2000 and regained the WBA title after defeating Ruiz by unanimous decision becoming the first four-time heavyweight champion. Holyfield's fourth reign, however, would be short-lived. Ruiz would capture the title in a rematch later in the year and the two fought to a draw in their third bout. Holyfield then met the former WBC and IBF heavyweight champion Hasim Rahman (who had recently lost his titles in a rematch with Lennox Lewis) in a WBA heavyweight title "eliminator" match with the winner to earn a shot at the WBA title. Holyfield picked up the victory by referee technical decision, but rather than face Ruiz for the WBA title for a fourth time, agreed to face Chris Byrd for the now vacant IBF version of the heavyweight championship. At the urging of promoter Don King, Lennox Lewis vacated the title shortly after defeating Mike Tyson, allowing King to put together the Byrd–Holyfield match with hopes of pitting the winner against the winner of the John Ruiz–Roy Jones Jr. WBA championship bout. Byrd came into the fight with an impressive 35–2 record and was two years removed from capturing the WBO heavyweight title after handing the previously undefeated Vitali Klitschko his first loss. Byrd then lost the title in his first defense to Vitali's brother Wladimir, but became the IBF's number one contender the following year after winning an IBF heavyweight title "eliminator" mini-tournament by defeating Maurice Harris and David Tua.

== Fight details ==
The fight went the full 12 rounds, Holyfield's fifth consecutive championship fight to go the distance. The younger and quicker Byrd was able to keep the aging Holyfield off balance throughout the fight with his right jab. As the fight went on, Holyfield seemed to tire and took a more defensive approach, allowing Byrd to control most of the action. As a result, the judge's scores were lopsided in favor of Byrd. Two judges had Byrd winning by the score of 117–111, while the other had him winning by the score of 116–112. Holyfield would attribute his loss to a left shoulder injury he sustained early in the fight that he claimed prevented him effectively using his left hand.

== Aftermath ==
Byrd's reign would last over three years and he would successfully defend his titles four times during that span with decision victories over Fres Oquendo, Jameel McCline and DaVarryl Williamson and a draw with Andrew Golota. His reign would come to an end on April 22, 2006 after losing a rematch to Wladimir Klitschko by seventh-round technical knockout.

Though it was not known if the now 40-year-old Holyfield would continue his quest for a fifth heavyweight title, he ultimately decided to continue on and met former IBF middleweight, super middleweight and cruiserweight champion James Toney in Toney's heavyweight debut on October 4, 2003. Holyfield had a strong first round, but Toney dominated the remainder of the fight before Holyfield's corner stopped the fight in the ninth. Holyfield then lost his third consecutive fight after losing by unanimous decision to Larry Donald. After nearly two years away from the ring, Holyfield returned on August 8, 2006 and proceeded to win his next four fights. He would gain two consecutive world title matches, first challenging Sultan Ibragimov for the WBO title on October 13, 2007 but lost by unanimous decision. Over a year later, Holyfield returned to challenge towering WBA champion Nikolai Valuev but lost a close majority decision.

== Undercard ==
Confirmed bouts:

Winner	Loser	Weight division/title belt(s) disputed	Result
(United States) Lamon Brewster	(United States) Tommy Martin	WBO NABO heavyweight title	3rd-round TKO.
(United States) Fres Oquendo	(Brazil) George Arias	vacant WBA Fedelatin heavyweight title	11th-round TKO.
(Canada) Syd Vanderpool	(Togo) Jaffa Ballogou	Super Middleweight (10 rounds)	2nd-round TKO.
(United States) Faruq Saleem	(Canada) Richie Jero	Heavyweight (10 rounds)	1st-round TKO.
(Jamaica) Owen Beck	(United States) Craig Tomlinson	Heavyweight (10 rounds)	5th-round TKO.
(Dominican Republic) Louis Azille	(United States) Sam Reese	Cruiserweight (8 rounds)	Majority decision.

== Broadcasting ==
Country	Broadcaster
Germany	ARD
United States	HBO

Preceded by vs. Jeff Pegues	Chris Byrd's bouts December 14 2002	Succeeded by vs. Fres Oquendo
Preceded by vs. Hasim Rahman	Evander Holyfield's bouts December 14 2002	Succeeded by vs. James Toney
