= Chris Byrd =

American boxer (born 1970)

Personal information
- Nickname: Rapid Fire
- Born: Christopher Cornelius Byrd; August 15, 1970 (age 56) Flint, Michigan, U.S.
- Height: 6 ft 1 in (185 cm)
- Weight: Heavyweight

Boxing career
- Reach: 74 in (188 cm)
- Stance: Southpaw

Boxing record
- Total fights: 48
- Wins: 41
- Win by KO: 22
- Losses: 6
- Draws: 1
Medal record
Men's amateur boxing
Representing United States
Olympic Games
Silver medal – second place	1992 Barcelona	Middleweight

Christopher Cornelius Byrd (born August 15, 1970) is an American former professional boxer who competed from 1993 to 2009, and then returned for a comeback bout in 2026. He is a two-time world heavyweight champion, having first won the WBO world title in 2000 after an upset corner stoppage over then-undefeated Vitali Klitschko. In his first title defense later that year, he lost to Vitali's brother Wladimir Klitschko. In 2002, Byrd defeated Evander Holyfield to win the IBF heavyweight world title for his second reign as world champion. He made four successful defenses until losing his title again to Wladimir Klitschko in a 2006 rematch. He was ranked by BoxRec in the world's top 10 heavyweight from 1998 to 2004, reaching his highest ranking of No.3 in 2000.

As an amateur, Byrd represented the United States at the 1992 Summer Olympics and won a silver medal in the middleweight division. His father Joe W Byrd was the coach for the Olympic boxing team, which also included future world champions Oscar De La Hoya and Vernon Forrest, amongst others.

He is also a three-time national amateur champion, winning the light middleweight title in 1989, and the middleweight title in 1991 and 1992.

== Early life ==
Chris Byrd was the youngest of eight children growing up in Flint, Michigan. He began boxing at age 5, training in his father's (Joe Sr.) Joe Byrd Boxing Academy. His father continued to train and manage Byrd as a professional. Byrd attended Flint Northwestern High School.

== Amateur career ==
Byrd began competing in the ring at age 10, since then he had 285 amateur fights in various weight classes, compiled an impressive record of 275 wins, 10 losses. He was a three-time U.S. amateur champion (1989, 1991, and 1992). He was on the 1991 U.S. National boxing Team that became the first (and only) U.S. team to score a tie against the heralded Cuban team. Byrd won the silver medal in the 1992 Barcelona summer Olympics as a middleweight, losing to Cuba's Ariel Hernández in the final.

=== Amateur highlights ===
- Lost in the 1988 Olympic Trials at Light Welterweight, losing to eventual United States representative Todd Foster.
- 1989 United States Amateur Light Middleweight Champion
- 1990 Goodwill Games in Seattle, lost to Torsten Schmitz (East Germany) on points, in Light Middleweight competition.
- 1991 United States Amateur Middleweight Champion
- 1991 World Championships, lost at Middlweight to Ramon Garbey (Cuba)
- 1992 United States Amateur Middleweight Champion
- 1992 Middleweight Gold Medalist at Canada Cup. Results were:
  - Justin Crawford (Australia) won on points
  - Joe Laryea (Ghana) won on points
  - Igor Anashkin (Russia) won on points
- 1992 Qualified as a Middleweight at the Olympic Trials in Worcester, MA. Results were:
  - Derrick James won on points
  - William Joppy won on points
  - Mike DeMoss won on points
  - Eric Carr won on points, this bout was at the Olympic Box-Offs in Phoenix, AZ*
- Captured the Middleweight Silver Medal at the 1992 Barcelona Olympic Games. Results were:
  - Mark Edwards (Great Britain) 21-3
  - Alexander Lebziak (Russia/Unified Team) 16-7
  - Ahmed Dine (Algeria) 21-2
  - Chris Johnson (Canada) 17-3
  - Ariel Hernandez (Cuba) 7-12

== Professional career ==
=== 1993–1998: early career ===
Byrd turned professional on January 28, 1993, knocking out 10 of his first 13 opponents. Byrd moved up to heavyweight three fights into his professional career.

Byrd remained undefeated for his first 26 fights, knocking off then-notable opponents like Phil Jackson, Lionel Butler, Uriah Grant, Bert Cooper, Craig Peterson, Frankie Swindell, Jimmy Thunder, undefeated Eliecer Castillo and Ross Puritty.

=== 1999: Byrd vs. Ibeabuchi, comeback victories ===
However, in 1999, Byrd's undefeated record came to a dead end when he fought undefeated Ike Ibeabuchi. With 48 seconds left in the fifth round, a left-handed bolo punch followed with a right hook sent Byrd to the canvas, face first.

=== 2000: first world title, facing the Klitschkos ===
During the last week of March 2000, Byrd was offered the chance to be the replacement (for Donovan Ruddock) against undefeated champion Vitali Klitschko in Berlin, Germany (Klitschko's adopted home country) for the WBO Heavyweight Title. He therefore had only seven days to prepare for the fight (not the customary 6–12 weeks). Byrd was trailing after nine rounds by scores of 88–83 (on two cards) and 89–82 (on one card), i.e. losing seven or eight of those rounds. However, Byrd was arguably Vitali's most difficult opponent as he landed clean shots and made him miss regularly, resulting Klitschko severely injured his shoulder and being unable to continue after the ninth round. The injury that Klitschko suffered was a torn shoulder rotator cuff, which required major surgery and a 7-month lay-off. Despite trailing on all three of the judges' scorecards, Byrd walked away the winner by a technical knockout due to the injury to Klitschko. Vitali landed at a much lower percentage and while he threw more, Byrd almost landed as many punches as him.

Six months later, Byrd was back in Germany to defend the title against Wladimir Klitschko, Vitali's younger, more agile brother. Twelve rounds later, Byrd had lost a lopsided unanimous decision and the WBO belt after being knocked down twice.

=== 2001–2002: comeback victories, second world title ===
Byrd returned to the U.S., signed with Don King and beat Maurice Harris to win the United States Boxing Association heavyweight belt in Madison Square Garden. He was now a top-five contender for the IBF title. After winning his next match (a title defense against New Zealand's top contender David Tua) Byrd eventually received his mandatory shot at the vacant IBF world Heavyweight Championship against Evander Holyfield in Atlantic City. On December 14, 2002, Byrd won a unanimous decision and the IBF title.

=== 2003–2005: four successful title defenses ===
Byrd has successfully defended the IBF belt against: Fres Oquendo in 2003, a highly entertaining draw with Andrew Golota and a decision win over friend Jameel McCline in 2004, and DaVarryl Williamson in 2005. Byrd's fight with Golota did 75,000 buys on pay-per-view.

=== 2006: Klitschko rematch ===
On April 22, 2006, Byrd faced Wladimir Klitschko for the second time. Byrd was making his fifth defense of his IBF title and the fight was also sanctioned by the International Boxing Organization for its title, which had been vacated upon the retirement of Lennox Lewis. The fight took place at SAP Arena in Mannheim, Germany. Byrd was heavily dominated throughout the fight, was down in the fifth, and again in the seventh. Referee Wayne Kelly stopped the fight after the second knockdown when Byrd had an open cut near his eyes. Klitschko won in a TKO.

=== 2007–2010: Povetkin bout, move to light heavyweight, and retirement ===
After losing to Alexander Povetkin, Byrd would drop about 40 pounds to return to the light heavyweight division. He fought Shaun George on May 16, 2008, at the Thomas and Mack Center in Las Vegas. Byrd was dropped by George in round one and rocked again in round two. George then hammered Byrd with his right hand at will, finally flooring Byrd twice in the ninth round. Byrd beat the count after the first knockdown, but was then battered down again and the bout was waved off by the referee.

In 2010, Byrd officially announced his retirement from boxing.

=== 2026: Comeback ===
At the age of 55 and 17 years after his last competitive boxing match, Byrd made a comeback against 27 year old Anthony Welsh in a middleweight contest in Zambia on June 27, 2026. He was knocked to the canvas in the first round and, although he got back to his feet, he sustained a further barrage of unanswered blows which caused the referee to halt the bout shortly afterwards.

== Life outside boxing ==
Byrd hosts a weekly video podcast, entitled "Byrd's Eye View", which showcases former boxers as well as current professional and champion-level fighters.

== Additional information ==
- Byrd's hometown is Flint, Michigan, where he trained along with his brother Patrick Byrd and sister Tracy Byrd. Byrd's other sister, Laurie Byrd, is a professional basketball coach. Byrd is also a first cousin of Lamon Brewster, himself a former world heavyweight champion and two-time Klitschko opponent.
- Byrd's corner consisted entirely of family members.
- Byrd made an appearance in the 2008 documentary Beyond the Ropes.
- Byrd also makes an appearance in the 2011 documentary Klitschko, in which he discusses his trio of title bouts with the brothers.

== Professional boxing record ==
48 fights	41 wins	6 losses
By knockout	22	5
By decision	19	1
Draws	1	

No.	Result	Record	Opponent	Type	Round, time	Date	Location	Notes
48	Loss	41-6-1	Anthony Welsh	KO	1 (12), 2:16	Jun 27, 2026	Baluba Game Resort, Luanshya, Zambia	For vacant WABA international middleweight title
47	Win	41–5–1	Matthias Sandow	TKO	4 (8), 1:30	Mar 21, 2009	Hanns-Martin-Schleyer-Halle, Stuttgart, Germany	
46	Loss	40–5–1	Shaun George	TKO	9 (10), 2:42	May 16, 2008	Thomas & Mack Center, Paradise, Nevada, U.S.	
45	Loss	40–4–1	Alexander Povetkin	TKO	11 (12), 1:52	Oct 27, 2007	Messe, Erfurt, Germany	
44	Win	40–3–1	Paul Marinaccio	RTD	7 (10), 0:01	Apr 18, 2007	Clifford Park, Nassau, Bahamas	
43	Loss	39–3–1	Wladimir Klitschko	TKO	7 (12), 0:41	Apr 22, 2006	SAP Arena, Mannheim, Germany	Lost IBF heavyweight title; For vacant IBO heavyweight title
42	Win	39–2–1	DaVarryl Williamson	UD	12	Oct 1, 2005	Events Center, Reno, Nevada, U.S.	Retained IBF heavyweight title
41	Win	38–2–1	Jameel McCline	SD	12	Nov 13, 2004	Madison Square Garden, New York City, New York, U.S.	Retained IBF heavyweight title
40	Draw	37–2–1	Andrew Golota	SD	12	Apr 17, 2004	Madison Square Garden, New York City, New York, U.S.	Retained IBF heavyweight title
39	Win	37–2	Fres Oquendo	UD	12	Sep 20, 2003	Mohegan Sun Arena, Montville, Connecticut, U.S.	Retained IBF heavyweight title
38	Win	36–2	Evander Holyfield	UD	12	Dec 14, 2002	Boardwalk Hall, Atlantic City, New Jersey, U.S.	Won vacant IBF heavyweight title
37	Win	35–2	Jeff Pegues	TKO	3 (10), 2:43	Jun 8, 2002	Soaring Eagle Casino & Resort, Mount Pleasant, Michigan, U.S.	
36	Win	34–2	David Tua	UD	12	Aug 18, 2001	Cox Pavilion, Paradise, Nevada, U.S.	Retained IBF–USBA heavyweight title
35	Win	33–2	Maurice Harris	UD	12	May 12, 2001	Madison Square Garden, New York City, New York, U.S.	Won vacant IBF–USBA heavyweight title
34	Win	32–2	David Vedder	UD	10	Jan 19, 2001	Soaring Eagle Casino & Resort, Mount Pleasant, Michigan, U.S.	
33	Loss	31–2	Wladimir Klitschko	UD	12	Oct 14, 2000	Kölnarena, Cologne, Germany	Lost WBO heavyweight title
32	Win	31–1	Vitali Klitschko	RTD	9 (12), 3:00	Apr 1, 2000	Estrel Hotel, Berlin, Germany	Won WBO heavyweight title
31	Win	30–1	David Washington	TKO	10 (10)	Jan 19, 2000	Soaring Eagle Casino & Resort, Mount Pleasant, Michigan, U.S.	
30	Win	29–1	Val Smith	KO	2 (10), 2:39	Oct 22, 1999	Joe Louis Arena, Detroit, Michigan, U.S.	
29	Win	28–1	Jose Ribalta	RTD	3 (10), 3:00	Jun 3, 1999	Soaring Eagle Casino & Resort, Mount Pleasant, Michigan, U.S.	
28	Win	27–1	John Sargent	TKO	2 (10), 2:03	May 8, 1999	Silver Star Casino, Philadelphia, Mississippi, U.S.	
27	Loss	26–1	Ike Ibeabuchi	TKO	5 (10), 2:59	Mar 20, 1999	Emerald Queen Casino, Tacoma, Washington, U.S.	
26	Win	26–0	Ross Puritty	UD	10	Jul 14, 1998	Casino Magic, Bay St. Louis, Mississippi, U.S.	
25	Win	25–0	Eliecer Castillo	UD	10	May 30, 1998	Bally's Park Place, Atlantic City, New Jersey, U.S.	
24	Win	24–0	Derek Amos	TKO	6 (10)	Mar 28, 1998	Boardwalk Hall, Atlantic City, New Jersey, U.S.	
23	Win	23–0	Jimmy Thunder	TKO	9 (10), 1:07	Dec 13, 1997	Foxwoods Resort Casino, Ledyard, Connecticut, U.S.	
22	Win	22–0	Frankie Swindell	UD	10	Jun 20, 1997	Bally's Park Place, Atlantic City, New Jersey, U.S.	
21	Win	21–0	Bert Cooper	UD	10	Mar 18, 1997	IMA Sports Arena, Flint, Michigan, U.S.	
20	Win	20–0	Craig Petersen	TKO	6 (10), 2:22	Jan 28, 1997	The Palace, Auburn Hills, Michigan, U.S.	
19	Win	19–0	Levi Billups	UD	10	Oct 8, 1996	IMA Sports Arena, Flint, Michigan, U.S.	
18	Win	18–0	Uriah Grant	UD	10	Aug 6, 1996	IMA Sports Arena, Flint, Michigan, U.S.	
17	Win	17–0	Biko Botowamungu	UD	10	May 17, 1996	Stock Arena, Monroe, Michigan, U.S.	
16	Win	16–0	Lionel Butler	TKO	8 (10), 0:57	Apr 23, 1996	The Palace, Auburn Hills, Michigan, U.S.	
15	Win	15–0	Jeff Wooden	UD	10	Jan 30, 1996	The Palace, Auburn Hills, Michigan, U.S.	
14	Win	14–0	Phil Jackson	UD	12	Nov 21, 1996	The Palace, Auburn Hills, Michigan, U.S.	
13	Win	13–0	Nathaniel Fitch	KO	7 (10)	Oct 3, 1995	IMA Sports Arena, Flint, Michigan, U.S.	
12	Win	12–0	Tim Puller	TKO	5 (10), 2:55	Jul 18, 1995	IMA Sports Arena, Flint, Michigan, U.S.	
11	Win	11–0	Arthur Williams	SD	10	May 23, 1995	The Palace, Auburn Hills, Michigan, U.S.	
10	Win	10–0	Joel Humm	RTD	4 (8)	Apr 26, 1995	The Palace, Auburn Hills, Michigan, U.S.	
9	Win	9–0	Mike Rouse	TKO	6 (12), 1:56	Mar 28, 1995	IMA Sports Arena, Flint, Michigan, U.S.	
8	Win	8–0	Frankie Hines	TKO	2, 0:59	Jan 1, 1995	Virginia Beach, Virginia, U.S.	
7	Win	7–0	Ron Gullette	TKO	5	Nov 1, 1994	Flint, Michigan, U.S.	
6	Win	6–0	Waxxen Fikes	TKO	4 (8), 2:49	Oct 4, 1994	The Palace, Auburn Hills, Michigan, U.S.	
5	Win	5–0	Max Key	KO	1	Aug 30, 1994	Flint, Michigan, U.S.	
4	Win	4–0	Gerard O'Neal	TKO	2 (6)	Jun 7, 1994	Flint, Michigan, U.S.	
3	Win	3–0	Exum Speight	UD	6	Mar 22, 1994	Flint, Michigan, U.S.	
2	Win	2–0	Mike Sullivan	TKO	1	May 15, 1993	Flint, Michigan, U.S.	
1	Win	1–0	Gary Smith	UD	6	Jan 28, 1993	IMA Sports Arena, Flint, Michigan, U.S.	

== Viewership ==
=== Germany ===
Date	Fight	Viewership (avg.)	Network	Source(s)
April 1, 2000	Vitali Klitschko vs. Chris Byrd	9,790,000	Sat.1	
October 14, 2000	Chris Byrd vs. Wladimir Klitschko	8,190,000	Sat.1	
April 24, 2006	Chris Byrd vs. Wladimir Klitschko II	10,170,000	Das Erste	
October 27, 2007	Chris Byrd vs. Alexander Povetkin	4,570,000	Das Erste	
	Total viewership	32,720,000		

=== US pay-per-view bouts ===
Date	Fight	Pay-per-view buys	Network	Source(s)
April 17, 2004	Chris Byrd vs. Andrew Golota	75,000	Spike TV/King Vision	
December 11, 2004	Chris Byrd vs. Jameel McCline	120,000	HBO PPV	
	Total sales	195,000		

== See also ==
- List of heavyweight boxing champions
- List of IBF world champions
- List of WBO world champions
- List of southpaw stance boxers

Sporting positions
Amateur boxing titles
Previous: Frankie Liles	U.S. light middleweight champion 1989	Next: Paul Vaden
Previous: Michael DeMoss	U.S. middleweight champion 1991, 1992	Next: Eric Wright
Regional boxing titles
Vacant Title last held by David Tua	IBF–USBA heavyweight champion May 12, 2001 – December 14, 2002; Won world title	Vacant Title next held by Tye Fields
World boxing titles
Preceded by Vitali Klitschko	WBO heavyweight champion April 1, 2000 – October 14, 2000	Succeeded by Wladimir Klitschko
Vacant Title last held by Lennox Lewis	IBF heavyweight champion December 14, 2002 – April 22, 2006	Succeeded by Wladimir Klitschko
