= Aaron Mitchell (boxer) =

American boxer

Aaron Mitchell (born August 25, 1969) is a middleweight boxer from Vero Beach, Florida. He was the WBO NABO middleweight champion.
