= Chris Byrd vs. Wladimir Klitschko =

Boxing competition

Die Rache des Bruders
- Date: 14 October 2000
- Venue: Kolnarena, Cologne, North Rhine-Westphalia, Germany
- Title(s) on the line: WBO Heavyweight Championship

Tale of the tape
Boxer	Chris Byrd	Wladimir Klitschko
Nickname	Rapid Fire	Dr Steelhammer
Hometown	Flint, Michigan, U.S.	Kyiv, Ukraine
Pre-fight record	31–1 (19 KO)	34–1 (32 KO)
Age	30 years, 1 month	24 years, 6 months
Height	6 ft 1 1/2 in (187 cm)	6 ft 6 in (198 cm)
Weight	213 1/2 lb (97 kg)	238 lb (108 kg)
Style	Southpaw	Orthodox
Recognition	WBO; Heavyweight Champion	WBO; No. 1 Ranked Heavyweight

Result
- Klitschko wins via unanimous decision (120–106, 119–107, 118–108)

Chris Byrd vs. Wladimir Klitschko, billed as Die Rache des Bruders (German for "Revenge Of The Brother"), was a professional boxing match contested on 14 October 2000 for the WBO Heavyweight Championship.

== Background ==
After his shock victory over the undefeated Vitali Klitschko, following Vitali suffering a torn rotator cuff, Chris Byrd agreed to face his number one contender, and Vitali's younger brother Wladimir. Wladimir Klitschko had won ten fights in a row following his first pro loss at the hands of journeyman Ross Puritty in December 1998.

== The fight ==
Klitschko knocked Byrd down in round nine and again in round eleven on route to a clear unanimous decision victory with scores of 120-106, 119-107 & 118-108, giving him his first world title belt.

== Aftermath ==
Wladimir would go on to make six defences of his title before he suffered a knockout loss to Corrie Sanders in March 2003. Byrd would win his next four bouts, including against Maurice Harris and David Tua in an IBF heavyweight title "eliminator" mini-tournament which put him in line for a shot at the IBF belt then held by Lennox Lewis. Lewis would vacate the title and Byrd would face former champion Evander Holyfield for the vacant belt.

== Undercard ==
Confirmed bouts:

== Broadcasting ==
Country	Broadcaster
Germany	Sat.1
United Kingdom	Sky Box Office

Preceded by vs. Vitali Klitschko	Chris Byrd' bouts 14 October 2000	Succeeded by vs. David Vedder
Preceded by vs. Monte Barrett	Wladimir Klitschko's bouts 14 October 2000	Succeeded by vs. Derrick Jefferson
