= Fres Oquendo =

Puerto Rican boxer

Personal information
- Nicknames: Fast Fres; The Big O
- Nationality: American
- Born: Fres Oquendo; April 1, 1973 (age 53) San Juan, Puerto Rico
- Height: 6 ft 2 in (1.88 m)
- Weight: Heavyweight

Boxing career
- Reach: 80 in (203 cm)
- Stance: Orthodox

Boxing record
- Total fights: 45
- Wins: 37
- Win by KO: 24
- Losses: 8

Fres Oquendo (born April 1, 1973) is a Puerto Rican former professional boxer who fought in the heavyweight division. He had a successful amateur record before turning professional in 1997. He unsuccessfully challenged three times for world heavyweight titles.

== Amateur career ==
He had an amateur record of 105–5:

- 1990: 178 lb. Springfield Golden Gloves Champion
- 1992: 178 lb. Chicago City Golden Glove Champion
- 1993: Chicago City Golden Glove 201 lb.+ Super Heavyweight Champion
- 1993: National Golden Gloves Heavyweight Champion
- 1995: Chicago City Golden Glove 201 lb.+ Super Heavyweight Champion

== Professional career ==
Known as "Fast Fres" and "The Big O", Oquendo won his first 22 professional bouts, including impressive victories over Duncan Dokiwari, Bert Cooper, Clifford Etienne, David Izon, and Obed Sullivan. In 2002, while at his peak, Oquendo took on David Tua. Oquendo controlled the fight until the 9th round when Tua caught him with a series of heavy blows causing the fight to be stopped. Oquendo was noticeably unsteady on his feet after the stoppage and had to hold the top rope to stay upright.

In 2003, Oquendo came from behind to KO Maurice Harris in the 10th, setting up a shot at IBF heavyweight title holder Chris Byrd. In a close fight, Byrd won a decision to keep his IBF belt. In 2004, Oquendo got another shot at a belt against WBA heavyweight title holder John Ruiz, losing by TKO in round 11. Oquendo then took 2 years off for surgery to repair a torn lab-rum, returning early 2006. Quick wins against Brazilian champ Daniel Bispo and then Javier Mora set up a fight against Evander Holyfield, which Holyfield won by unanimous decision on November 10, 2006, at the Alamodome in San Antonio, Texas. He almost called off the fight as suggested by the UCLA Medical Center due to tonsillitis and strep-throat but decided to fight anyway. Two judges scored the fight 114-113 for Holyfield, indicating the fight would have been a draw if Oquendo had not suffered a flash knockdown in the first round. He again gained the WBC-WBO Latino belt in 2007, after defeating Dominique Alexander then following it up with a win against Cuban Elisier Castillo. In a grueling ESPN bout in Miami, Florida, Oquendo outlasted Castillo. In late 2008, Oquendo lost a fight to James Toney on December 13, by split decision. He was deducted a point in the 8th round for a questionable rabbit punch, and the fight was labeled the robbery of the year. Oquendo was seen as winning by Versus viewers and by all press row. Versus analysts 115–113 & 116–112 respectively and compubox numbers had overwhelmingly favored Oquendo.

Oquendo fought Bruce Seldon on July 24, 2009, in a Regional Title bout which was officiated by fellow Carl Schurz High School Graduate, Alma Mater, World Class referee Pete Podgorski. Oquendo defeated Seldon by knockout in the 9th round in a bout which Seldon took a knee in round 8 and in round 9 was knocked down and counted out. In 2010 Oquendo became only the 2nd man in 35 Pro fights to stop Demetrice King and gain the USBA & NABA titles. He then fought former champion Jean-Marc Mormeck and lost in a fight that Dan Rafael called candidate for "robbery of the year". Oquendo then fought former heavyweight champion Oliver McCall in another split decision loss in December 2010.

In 2011, Oquendo has remained dormant choosing to help prepare former WBA champion David Haye at the World Famous Angelo Dundee's 5th St. Gym, where he himself trains, then fly to Austria to help WBC champion Vitali Klitschko prepare for his victory over Tomasz Adamek in Poland. As of June 2011, Fres had more rounds boxed as a Heavyweight than any of the 3 Heavyweight Champions and all of the top 10 Heavyweights in all 4 major governing bodies and is the only heavyweight in history to hold the USBA, NABA, NABF, WBC, WBA & WBO Latino belts. He is a 2 time World title Challenger and has been ranked as high as number 3 in Ring Magazine.

In 2012, Oquendo made his return to the ring with a 2nd round DQ, (originally scored a TKO) against World Record holder Travis Fulton. Oquendo broke Fulton's nose in the 1st round and proceeded to land un-answered punches. In round 2, although Fulton was game, Oquendo proved too much for the experienced boxer. An MMA takedown of Oquendo and excessive holding Fulton finally succumbed to Oquendo's arsenal. It was all over when the Ref waved it off. Fulton thanked Oquendo for the opportunity. Oquendo had two consecutive win in 2012, one against Joey Abell to win the WBA Fedelatin Championship via TKO and followed up by a stoppage of veteran Robert Hawkins. Oquendo broke his hand in the 3rd round, yet still managed to stop the tough and durable Hawkins. Oquendo fought June 8, 2013 to defend his WBA Fedelatin and also fight for the NABA and WBC US Silver belt.

In a fight against Derric Rossy, Oquendo slipped and tore his meniscus in round 3 and fought 7 rounds with little movement. The fight was close as Rossy seemed to take Oquendo's shots and give back as much. When the decision came in Oquendo got the nod in a fight he had to show heart fighting injured. He began training and expected to have a great 2014 hopefully fighting for the WBA World Championship, the WBC World Championship or the WBC World Cup Tournament where he would represent his division and country.

On May 10, 2014, Oquendo fought Galen Brown. Oquendo won via a second-round TKO. On July 6, 2014, Oquendo fought former champion Ruslan Chagaev, for the vacant WBA world heavyweight title. Chagaev was the more aggressive fighter in the first four rounds of the fight. The remainder of the fight saw both boxers having their ups and downs but Oquendo took over the fight. In the end, two of the judges saw Chagaev as the winner by a slim margin, both scoring it 115–113, while the third judge had it 114–114, ultimately leading to a majority-decision win for Chagaev. oquendo was not paid his full $1,000,000 purse and sued the promoter and Chechnyan government in the Southern District of Court in a landmark case which Oquendo won. This forced the WBA and the Chagaev team ro a rematch however Chagaev retired.

In September 2018, Oquendo was slated to fight Manuel Charr for the WBA heavyweight title, but the fight was called off after Charr tested positive for a banned substance.

== Professional boxing record ==
37 Wins (24 knockouts), 8 Losses, 0 Draws
Result	Record	Opponent	Type	Round	Date	Location	Notes
Loss	37–8	(Uzbekistan) Ruslan Chagaev	MD	12	07/06/2014	Grozny, Russia	For vacant WBA (Regular) World Heavyweight title.
Win	37–7	(United States) Galen Brown	TKO	2 (8)	10/05/2014	Memorial Hall, Kansas City, Kansas, United States	
Win	36–7	(United States) Derric Rossy	UD	10	08/06/2013	Horseshoe Casino, Hammond, Indiana, United States	Retained WBA Fedelatin heavyweight title and won vacant NABA Heavyweight title.
Win	35–7	(United States) Robert Hawkins	RTD	7 (10)	18/08/2012	Horseshoe Casino, Hammond, Indiana, United States	
Win	34–7	(United States) Joey Abell	TKO	9 (10)	25/05/2012	Horseshoe Casino, Hammond, Indiana, United States	Won vacant WBA Fedelatin heavyweight title.
Win	33–7	(United States) Travis Fulton	DQ	2 (4)	03/03/2012	Dance Land Ballroom, Davenport, Iowa, United States	
Loss	32–7	(United States) Oliver McCall	SD	12	07/12/2010	Seminole Hard Rock Hotel & Casino Hollywood, Hollywood, Florida, United States	For vacant IBF Inter-Continental Heavyweight title.
Loss	32–6	(France) Jean-Marc Mormeck	UD	12	06/05/2010	Halle Georges Carpentier, Paris, France	
Win	32–5	(United States) Demetrice King	RTD	9 (12)	20/02/2010	Horseshoe Hammond, Hammond, Indiana, United States	King did not come out at the bell for the 10th round. Retained NABA Heavyweight title & won vacant USBA Heavyweight title.
Win	31–5	(United States) Bruce Seldon	KO	9 (10)	24/07/2009	UIC Pavilion, Chicago, Illinois, United States	Won interim NABA Heavyweight title. Seldon down in 8th & 9th rounds. Referee:Pete Podgorski
Win	30–5	(United States) Mark Brown	TKO	3 (10)	26/06/2009	UIC Pavilion, Chicago, Illinois, United States	Retained WBC Latino Heavyweight title.
Loss	29–5	(United States) James Toney	SD	12	13/12/2008	Morongo Casino Resort & Spa, Cabazon, California, United States	For vacant IBA & WBO NABO Heavyweight titles. Oquendo lost point in 8th round for rabbit punch.
Win	29–4	(United States) Dominique Alexander	KO	3 (8)	18/07/2008	Buffalo Bill's Star Arena, Primm, Nevada, United States	
Win	28–4	(Cuba) Elieser Castillo	UD	10	20/07/2007	Mahi Temple Shrine Auditorium, Miami, Florida, United States	Retained WBO Latino Heavyweight title & won vacant WBC Latino Heavyweight title.
Win	27–4	(Cuba) Damian Norris	TKO	6 (10)	02/05/2007	Mahi Temple Shrine Auditorium, Miami, Florida, United States	
Loss	26–4	(United States) Evander Holyfield	UD	12	10/11/2006	Alamodome, San Antonio, Texas, United States	For vacant USBA Heavyweight title. Oquendo down once in round 1.
Win	26–3	(Mexico) Javier Mora	UD	10	25/05/2006	Pechanga Resort & Casino, Temecula, California, United States	Won vacant WBO Latino Heavyweight title.
Win	25–3	(Brazil) Daniel Bispo	TKO	9 (10)	16/02/2006	Grand Ballroom, New York, New York, United States	
Loss	24–3	(United States) John Ruiz	TKO	11 (12)	17/04/2004	Madison Square Garden, New York, New York, United States	For WBA World Heavyweight title.
Loss	24–2	(United States) Chris Byrd	UD	12	20/09/2003	Mohegan Sun Casino, Uncasville, Connecticut, United States	For IBF Heavyweight title.
Win	24–1	(United States) Maurice Harris	KO	10 (12)	Mar 1, 2003	Thomas & Mack Center, Las Vegas, Nevada, United States	Harris was knocked down in 4th & 10th rounds. Harris was ahead on all the scorecards at the time of the stoppage.
Win	23–1	(Brazil) George Arias	TKO	11 (12)	14/12/2002	Boardwalk Hall, Atlantic City, New Jersey, United States	Won vacant WBA Fedelatin Heavyweight title. Arias cut over right eye and referee stops contest.
Loss	22–1	(New Zealand) David Tua	TKO	9 (12)	13/04/2002	Mountaineer Casino Racetrack and Resort, Chester, West Virginia, United States	Lost NABF Heavyweight title.
Win	22–0	(Nigeria) David Izon	TKO	3 (10)	01/12/2001	Jacob Javits CenterNew York, New York, United States	
Win	21–0	(United States) Obed Sullivan	TKO	11 (12)	02/09/2001	Silverstar Hotel & Casino Choctaw, Mississippi, United States	Won NABF Heavyweight title.
Win	20–0	(United States) Clifford Etienne	TKO	8 (10)	23/03/2001	Texas Station Casino Las Vegas, Nevada, United States	Etienne knocked down seven times, all by overhand rights: three times in the 1st round, once in the 2nd, once in the 3rd, once in the 7th and once in the 8th round.
Win	19–0	(United States) Willie Chapman	KO	4 (6)	10/12/2000	Grand Victoria Casino Elgin, Illinois, United States	Chapman down in 2nd & 3rd rounds. Chapman was dropped for the count in round 4 from a right uppercut-left hook combination.
Win	18–0	(Cuba) Ramon Garbey	UD	10	25/06/2000	Grand Victoria Casino Elgin, Illinois, United States	Both fighters down.
Win	17–0	(United States) Dale Crowe	UD	10	06/02/2000	Grand Victoria Casino Elgin, Illinois, United States	
Win	16–0	(United States) Bert Cooper	UD	10	16/10/1999	Star Plaza Theater Merrillville, Indiana, United States	
Win	15–0	(United States) Phil Jackson	UD	10	12/09/1999	Harrah's Casino Kansas City, Missouri, United States	
Win	14–0	(United States) Craig Payne	TKO	3 (6)	10/07/1999	Grand Victoria Casino Elgin, Illinois, United States	
Win	13–0	(United States) Bradley Rone	TKO	6 (6)	27/03/1999	Genesis Center Gary, Indiana, United States	
Win	12–0	(United States) Everett Martin	UD	6	20/03/1999	New Frontier Hotel Las Vegas, Nevada, United States	
Win	11–0	(Nigeria) Duncan Dokiwari	UD	6	16/01/1999	MGM Grand Las Vegas, Nevada, United States	
Win	10–0	(United States) Louis Monaco	PTS	6	11/12/1998	Pueblo, Colorado, United States	
Win	9–0	(United States) Bruce Douglas	TKO	1 (4)	13/11/1998	Miccosukee Indian Gaming Resort, Miami, Florida, United States	
Win	8–0	(United States) Wesley Martin	TKO	1 (4)	04/09/1998	Miccosukee Indian Gaming Resort, Miami, Florida, United States	
Win	7–0	(United States) Val Smith	TKO	2 (?)	12/06/1998	Belle of Baton Rouge Casino, Baton Rouge, Louisiana, United States	
Win	6–0	(Barbados) Richie Brown	MD	4	27/03/1998	Trump Marina Hotel Casino, Atlantic City, New Jersey, United States	
Win	5–0	(United States) Rahman Green	KO	4 (4)	27/03/1998	Trump Marina Hotel Casino, Atlantic City, New Jersey, United States	Green down twice in the 4th round.
Win	4–0	(United States) Sam Williams	TKO	3 (6)	13/12/1997	Concord Plaza Expo Center, Northlake, Illinois, United States	
Win	3–0	(United States) Jessie Henry	TKO	4 (6)	14/11/1997	South Padre Island, Texas, United States	
Win	2–0	(United States) Val Smith	UD	4	07/06/1997	Hawthorne Race Course, Cicero, Illinois, United States	
Win	1–0	(United States) Mark Johnson	TKO	4	10/05/1997	Hawthorne Race Course, Moline, Illinois, United States	

== Sources ==
- Fres Oquendo at BoxRec (registration required)
- Fres Oquendo at Box.Live
