= Ruslan Chagaev =

Uzbekistani boxer (born 1978)

Ruslan Chagaev Руслан Чагаев
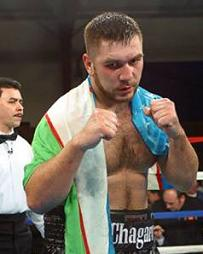
- Chagaev in 2007

Personal information
- Nickname: White Tyson
- Nationality: Uzbekistani
- Born: Ruslan Shamilevich Chagaev; 19 October 1978 (age 48) Andijan, Uzbek SSR, Soviet Union
- Height: 1.85 m (6 ft 1 in)
- Weight: Heavyweight

Boxing career
- Reach: 188 cm (74 in)
- Stance: Southpaw

Boxing record
- Total fights: 38
- Wins: 34
- Win by KO: 21
- Losses: 3
- Draws: 1
- No contests: 1
Medal record
Representing Uzbekistan
Men's amateur boxing
World Championships
Gold medal – first place	1997 Budapest	Heavyweight
Gold medal – first place	2001 Belfast	Super-heavyweight
World Junior Championships
Bronze medal – third place	1996 Havana	Heavyweight
Asian Games
Gold medal – first place	1998 Bangkok	Heavyweight
Asian Championships
Gold medal – first place	1999 Tashkent	Heavyweight

Ruslan Shamilevich Chagaev (Tatar: Руслан Шамил улы Чагаев, romanized: Ruslan Şamil ulı Çağayıw; Uzbek: Ruslan Shamilovich Chagayev; Russian: Руслан Шамилович Чагаев); born 19 October 1978) is an Uzbekistani former professional boxer who competed from 2001 to 2016. He held the World Boxing Association (WBA) heavyweight title twice (Regular version in his second reign) and was the first Asian boxer to win a world heavyweight title by any of the four major sanctioning bodies. He was ranked as a top 10 heavyweight or contender by The Ring magazine at the conclusion of each year between 2006 and 2015; at the end of 2008 he was ranked third, only behind the Klitschko brothers.

Chagaev is one of a few professional boxers to resume his amateur boxing career after a few professional bouts in 1997. He was reinstated as an amateur by the AIBA the following year as his professional bouts were declared exhibitions. As an amateur, Chagaev won gold medals at the 2001 World Championships and 1999 Asian Championships, in the heavyweight and super-heavyweight divisions respectively.

In 2007, Chagaev defeated then-unbeaten Nikolai Valuev to win his first WBA heavyweight title and would make two successful defences. Due to injuries and being unable to grant Valuev a rematch in 2009, the WBA stripped Chagaev of the title. He went on to suffer his first professional loss in the same year to unified heavyweight champion Wladimir Klitschko.

Chagaev won the WBA (Regular) heavyweight title by defeating Fres Oquendo in 2014. He made one successful defence before losing the title to Lucas Browne in 2016. However, after Browne failed a drug test, the WBA reinstated Chagaev as champion, but he was once again stripped of the title in July of that year after failing to pay sanctioning fees. On 28 July 2016, he announced his retirement from boxing due to ongoing eye injuries.

== Amateur career ==
Chagaev won gold at the 1997 World Amateur Boxing Championships heavyweight, defeating Félix Savón in the finals, but later he was stripped of the championship for having 2 professional bouts in the United States before the tournament. Chagaev is the only non-Cuban boxer to defeat Félix Savón twice, and the only one to do it at the world championships, which Savón have won consecutively. Savón suffered his first international defeat in more than a decade, when he met Chagaev for a first time. His amateur career is also merited with absence of stoppages on his part, with all four his losses were standing defeats with him being outpointed. Because of his performance at the 2001 World Amateur Boxing Championships, where Chagaev stopped every opponent he had faced, a rarity in amateur boxing competitions, Chagaev received the nickname "White Tyson".

=== Highlights ===
(gold) Asian Championships (91 kg), Tashkent, Uzbekistan, October 1995:

- 1/8: Defeated Jiang Tao (China) 11–4
- 1/4: Defeated Talgat Dossanov (Kazakhstan) 12–6
- 1/2: Defeated Bahman Azizpour (Iran) 20–4
- Finals: Defeated Lakha Singh (India) 16–1

(gold) Uzbek National Spartakiade (91 kg), Tashkent, Uzbekistan, January 1996:

- Finals: (no data available)

Summer Olympics (91 kg), Atlanta, Georgia, July 1996:

- 1/16: Lost to Luan Krasniqi (Germany) 4–12

(bronze) World Junior Championships (91 kg), Havana, Cuba, November 1996:

- 1/4: Defeated Marat Tovmasian (Armenia) RSC 3
- 1/2: Lost to Yurkis Sterling (Cuba) 11–14

(gold) Trofeo Italia (+81 kg), Naples, Italy, March 1997:

- Finals: Defeated Giacobbe Fragomeni (Italy) walkover

(gold) Usti Grand Prix (91 kg), Usti nad Labem, Czech Republic, March 1997:

- Finals: Defeated Volodymyr Lazebnyk (Ukraine) RSC 1

(gold) King's Cup (91 kg), Bangkok, Thailand, April 1997:

- 1/4: Defeated Waipramong Puiloh (Thailand) walkover
- 1/2: Defeated Harpal Singh (India) RSC 2
- Finals: Defeated Talgat Dossanov (Kazakhstan) RSCH 3

(gold) World Championships (91 kg), Budapest, Hungary, October 1997:

- 1/8: Defeated Sergey Dychkov (Belarus) 15–7 (5 rds)
- 1/4: Defeated Giacobbe Fragomeni (Italy) 18–4 (5 rds)
- 1/2: Defeated Maik Hanke (Germany) 12–7 (5 rds)
- Finals: Defeated Félix Savón (Cuba) 14–4 (5 rds)

On 8 February 1998, AIBA stripped the championship of Chagaev for having 2 professional bouts in the United States before the tournament.

(gold) Asian Games (91 kg), Bangkok, Thailand, December 1998:

- 1/4: Defeated Hitra Bahadur (Nepal) RSCH 1
- 1/2: Defeated Rouhollah Hosseini (Iran) 17–2
- Finals: Defeated Muzaffar Iqbal Mirza (Pakistan) RSCH 1

(gold) Strandzha Cup (91 kg), Plovdiv, Bulgaria, February 1999:

- Finals: Defeated Félix Savón (Cuba) 7–2 (4 rds)

(gold) French Open (91 kg), Calonne-Ricouart – Berck-sur-Mer – Gravelines, France, May 1999:

- 1/4: Defeated Reynald Zolnierczyk (France) RET 2
- 1/2: Defeated Sergey Dychkov (Belarus) 10–0
- Finals: Defeated Giacobbe Fragomeni (Italy) 3–2

World Championships (91 kg), Houston, Texas, August 1999:

- 1/16: Defeated Garth da Silva (New Zealand) 9–3 (4 rds)
- 1/8: Defeated David Turner (Australia) RSC 3
- 1/4: Lost to Félix Savón (Cuba) 1–9 (4 rds)

(gold) Asian Championships (91 kg), Tashkent, Uzbekistan, October 1999:

- 1/4: Defeated Ma Jing Wei (China) RSC 1
- 1/2: Defeated Rouhollah Hosseini (Iran) 13–5
- Finals: Defeated Talgat Dossanov (Kazakhstan) 14–0

(gold) Ahmet Cömert Memorial (91 kg), Istanbul, Turkey, April 2000:

- 1/2: Defeated Mehmet Hendem (Turkey) (4 rds)
- Finals: Defeated Odlanier Solís (Cuba) 4–3 (4 rds)

Summer Olympics (91 kg), Sydney, Australia, September 2000:

- 1/8: Defeated Oleksandr Yatsenko (Ukraine) 15–2
- 1/4: Lost to Vladimir Chanturia (Georgia) 12–18

(gold) Ahmet Cömert Memorial (+91 kg), Istanbul, Turkey, April–May 2001:

- 1/8: Defeated Wajid M'Barki (Tunisia)
- 1/4: (no data available)
- 1/2: Defeated Mehdi Aouiche (France)
- Finals: Defeated Oleksiy Mazikin (Ukraine) RET 2

(gold) World Championships (+91 kg), Belfast, Northern Ireland, June 2001:

- 1/8: Defeated Rustam Rygebayev (Kazakhstan) RSCO 3
- 1/4: Defeated Csaba Kurtucz (Hungary) RSCO 2
- 1/2: Defeated Vitali Boot (Germany) RSCO 3
- Finals: Defeated Oleksiy Mazikin (Ukraine) RSCO 2

Chagaev had a few professional bouts while competing as an amateur. He finished his amateur career having a total of 85 fights under his belt, with a record of 81 wins, 4 losses (no stoppages.)

== Professional career ==
=== 1997–2005: Early career ===
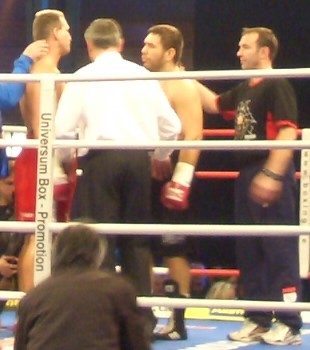
Ruslan Chagaev (center) inside the ring with his coach Michael Timm (right) challenging Rob Calloway (left). 7 January 2006).

Chagaev made his professional debut on 21 August 1997, defeating Donnie Penelton by first-round knockout. After defeating Brian Jones three weeks later by second-round KO, Chagaev returned to amateur boxing. He returned to professional boxing in 2001, beating an experienced journeyman Everett Martin on 21 September by fourth-round technical knockout, in what was Chagaev's first and only professional fight in his native Uzbekistan. It was around that time when Chagaev underwent surgery to fix the detachment of the retina in his left eye.

In his next bout, Chagaev faced journeyman Val Smith (10–16, 9 KOs) on 14 April 2002 at Hard Rock Hotel and Casino in Las Vegas, Nevada. The bout was part of the event that was aired on USA FOX, meaning this was Chagaev's first televised professional boxing match. Chagaev made a quick work of Smith, dropping him three times in the first round, with Smith not being able to beat the count after the third knockdown. 27 days later, Chagaev defeated Chris Isaac (6–3, 6 KOs) by a lopsided unanimous decision with scores 80–71 and 79–72 (twice) in a fight televised by Showtime.

After two back-to-back wins against Val Smith and Chris Isaac, Chagaev, with a 5–0 (4 KOs) record, faced Rob Calloway, who had a record of 42–4 (32 KOs) going into the bout and had never been stopped up to that date. Chagaev appeared to have won the first two rounds and was seemingly going for an early stoppage. Near the end of the third round, Chagaev staggered Calloway and followed with a barrage of punches, forcing Calloway to defenselessly lay on the ropes and prompting the referee to give Calloway a standing count. After examining a cut above Calloway's eye, the referee made the decision to stop the fight. Originally Chagaev was supposed to be declared the winner by third-round TKO, however the decision was overturned after it was established that the wound had been caused by a headbutt. Michigan boxing rule mandated that the fight be called a Technical Draw (TD) since the bout ended by an accidental foul.

In his next fight, Chagaev was supposed to face Robert Wiggins (17–2–1, 10 KOs), however Wiggins was replaced by undefeated Zakeem Graham (9–0–1, 7 KOs). The bout turned out to be Chagaev's last professional fight in the United States. The fight co-main evented a card aired on Showtime as part of the ShoBox: The New Generation boxing program. Graham was active in the first half of each round but Chagaev was blocking most of the shots with arms and gloves. With one minute left in the opening round, Chagaev hurt Graham with a left hook, breaking his nose in the process. Chagaev staggered Graham again at the end of the following round, and then again in the third, with the referee stopping the bout after Graham could not respond to a barrage of shots that followed. Chagaev won by third-round TKO.

Afterwards Chagaev signed with Universum Box-Promotion and relocated to Germany, mostly having fights scheduled there and in Austria. Chagaev admitted that his decision to sign the contract with German promoters was caused by the fact that in the United States he had only had four fights in two years and his career there hadn't had any clear direction. Chagaev returned to the ring on 18 November, facing Daniel Frank. Frank had a 12–5–1 record coming into the bout, scoring all his wins inside the distance, including a fourth-round TKO against Adilson Rodrigues (77–6–1, 61 KOs), and was 2–4 in his last six bouts, losing to long-reigning WBC cruiserweight champion Juan Carlos Gomez, Friday Ahunanya and Samuel Peter. The bout was placed on the undercard of the event that saw Stipe Drews facing Olivier Beard for the European light heavyweight title and was televised by Eurosport. Chagaev knocked Frank out in the second round.

In his first bout of 2004, Chagaev faced Sedreck Fields in a bout scheduled for six rounds. Like previously, the bout took place on the card aired on Eurosport. Each of the four main-event fights had at least one boxer from a post-Soviet country - him and Muhammadqodir Abdullaev were from Uzbekistan while heavyweight Taras Bidenko and bantamweight Volodymyr Sydorenko were from Ukraine. Sedreck had a record of 20–21–1, 14 KOs coming into the bout and had only been stopped by Lawrence Clay-Bey, Robert Davis and Oleg Maskaev in his professional career up to that date. Fields was mostly known for his victories over Shannon Briggs, former IBF world cruiserweight champion Al Cole and Finnish prospect Sami Elovaara and facing numerous boxers from Russia and Belarus. The fight was expected to be a tough challenge for Chagaev who had only 10 professional fights on his record coming into the bout. Chagaev won the bout by unanimous decision. The judges scored the bout 59–55 (twice) and 58–56.

After scoring two knockouts against Alexey Varakin and Wade Lewis inside two rounds each, Chagaev had a rematch with Sedreck Fields four months after their first encounter. The bout was scheduled for eight rounds and took place at Sportzentrum in Telfs, Austria. This was Chagaev's fifth fight in a row aired on Eurosport. The first round was tentative, with Chagaev finding most success with counter shots primarily to the body. Chagaev continued fighting in a counterpunching manner in the second round, ultimately dropping Fields with a left hook behind the ear and throwing off his equilibrium. Fields got up but Chagaev continued his assault, hurting Fields on several occasions and dropping him again with 27 seconds left. Fields barely beat the count, prompting the referee to stop the fight after Fields started running towards Chagaev and did not react to his instructions.

One month later, Chagaev faced Garing Lane in a bout scheduled for eight rounds. The bout took place on the undercard of Luan Krasniqi vs. Rene Monse and was televised by ZDF, one of Germany's leading television networks. For the fight Lane weighed in at a career high 318.5 pounds, reaching the 300 lb mark for the first time in his professional career. Chagaev dominated every round before ultimately stopping Lane with two left hooks to the body in the fifth. Chagaev finished 2004 with three stoppage wins over Willie Williams (16–8, 11 KOs), Asmir Vojnovic (22–5–1, 12 KOs) and Tommy Connelly (12–3, 10 KOs). Each of those fights was aired on Eurosport and finished within four rounds.

From 2005, Chagaev's fights were placed on cards televised by ZDF. Chagaev started 2005 with a fight against Sherman Williams on 26 March at Erdgas Arena. In the build-up, Chagaev's coach Michael Timm complimented his skillset and mindset, including punching power and precision, fearlessness and work ethic. He also added: "The fight in Riesa will show how Ruslan can deal with a man like Sherman Williams. He must convince spectators and experts that he is world class material. From past experiences we know that the spectators in Riesa know boxing. They watch every fight very closely." The fight was scheduled for eight rounds. Williams had a record of 25–9–2, 15 KOs coming into the bout, most notably beating Samson Po'uha (20–4–1, 18 KOs) and Al Cole and had only been stopped once in his professional boxing career. Chagaev won by unanimous decision, with scores 80–72, 79–73 and 78–74. Shortly after, because of the events that took place in his native Andijan, Chagaev took a break from boxing to return to Uzbekistan and look after his family.

Chagaev returned to the ring six months later on September 28, 2005, to face Jucimar Francisco Hipolito (10–3, 3 KOs) as part of the card dedicated to the 100th anniversary of the birth of former world heavyweight champion Max Schmeling, with the main event of the night being the WBO world heavyweight title fight between Luan Krasniqi and Lamon Brewster. The fight card had seven boxers from the former Soviet Bloc scheduled to fight - Chagaev, Alexander Dimitrenko, Denis Boytsov, Taras Bidenko, Valeriy Chechenev, Bagrat Ohanyan and Alexei Mazikin, with the latter being forced to pull out due to injury. Despite coming in at 236 lbs, the heaviest in his professional career and nine pounds heavier than in his previous bout, Chagaev made a quick work of Hipolito, dropping him twice in the first round before Hipolito's corner threw in the towel. Three weeks later, Chagaev took on Mark Krence (21–4, 6 KOs), dropping him twice in fourth and once in fifth before the bout was stopped, with Chagaev being declared the winner by 5th-round KO. With a record of 18–0–1, 15 KOs, Chagaev was ranked No.8 by the WBO and No.14 by the WBA.

At the beginning of 2006, Chagaev agreed for a rematch against Rob Calloway as a late-minute replacement for Alexander Dimitrenko who had to withdraw due to shoulder injury. The fight took place at Kulturhalle in Munich. Going into the bout, Calloway boosted his record to 55–6–1, 43 KOs. The first round was action-packed, with Chagaev fighting mostly in a counterpunching manner. Thirty seconds into the first round, as Calloway attempted to close distance, Chagaev hurt him with a left hook followed by a straight right hand, forcing Calloway to stumble across the ring. Chagaev hurt Calloway a few more times as the round progressed, throwing him out of position on several occasions. Chagaev continued dominating in the second round. With one minute left, Chagaev countered a jab with a left cross that stunned Calloway, then followed up with another left hand that sent Calloway to the floor. Calloway was able to get up but was unsteady on his feet, prompting the referee to stop the fight and declare Chagaev the winner by second-round knockout. As of January 2006, Chagaev was ranked No.7 contender by the WBO and No.14 by the WBA.

=== 2006: Title contender ===
==== Chagaev vs. Virchis ====
Two months after his rematch with Calloway, Chagaev stepped in to face undefeated Ukrainian prospect and former stablemate of his Vladimir Virchis for the WBO and WBA Inter-Continental titles. Coming into the bout, Virchis had a record of 20–0 with 17 KOs but was coming off of a controversial win over Michael Sprott (27–8, 15 KOs). He was ranked No.14 contender by the WBA and No.8 by the WBO, right behind Chagaev in each ranking. Both Chagaev and Virchis were regarded as heavy punchers and the bout was not expected to go the distance. Columnist Troy Ondrizek criticized the US media for not giving enough attention to the matchup: "In just five days a mega-fight between Ruslan Chagaev of Uzbekistan and Vladimir Virchis of Ukraine; will square off in what quite possibly be the best heavyweight fight this year. I am almost insulted to see so little press in regard to this fight. [...] The winner will be set up quite nicely for a title shot in the near future, and definite fame everywhere but the English-speaking world. [...] I for one would rather see this explosive affair, than a possibly boring twelve round fat man dance between Hasim Rahman and James Toney." In the build-up to the fight, Chagaev's trainer Artur Grigorian expressed his confidence in Chagaev's victory, praising his skills and work ethic, and predicted Chagaev to have a bright future in boxing. He also noted on Chagaev's popularity in Uzbekistan: "In Uzbekistan he has already reached Muhammad Ali's level of popularity. From the moment he won the Amateur World Boxing Championships, he has eventually become recognized by everyone in this country". Several members of the Universum Box Promotion came out with the statement that the winner would be lined up for a world heavyweight title shot. The bout took place on the undercard of Felix Sturm vs. Maselino Masoe and was televised by ZDF.

The bout went full twelve rounds, with Chagaev eventually winning a close decision. One judge had the bout 114–114 even, the second judge had Chagaev winning by one point (115–114), while the third one had Chagaev winning 116–112, giving him eight rounds. According to Compubox, Chagaev connected on 100 punches out of 412 (24.3% accuracy) while Virchis landed 104 out of 734 (14.2%). Chagaev outlanded Virchis in rounds 1, 4, 7, 8 and 11; Virchis landed more shots in rounds 2, 3, 5, 10 and 12; rounds 6 and 9 were even. Overall, there were 1,146 punches thrown. "Do I remember the fight? I remember that the crowd booed the decision. That's the biggest thank you for my performance. I'm confident I didn't lose that bout", Virchis said about the fight during the build-up to Chagaev's showdown with Wladimir Klitschko. After the win, Chagaev improved his position in both WBA and WBO rankings, going up to No.5 and No.6 respectively, and entered the WBC rankings at No.11 and IBF rankings at No.13. By April, Chagaev was ranked No.6 heavyweight in the world by The Ring.

==== Chagaev vs. Ruiz ====
Four months after defeating Virchis, Chagaev faced Michael Sprott (28–9, 15 KOs). Chagaev dominated the fight before ultimately stopping Sprott in the eighth round, defending his WBA Inter-Continental title and winning WBO's vacant Asia Pacific title. As of July 2006, Chagaev was ranked No.2 contender by the WBA, No.4 by the WBO and No.15 by the IBF. He was also ranked No.7 by the WBC by August.

Ranked No.2 by the WBA, Chagaev agreed to face former WBA champion and the organization's then-No.1 contender John Ruiz (41–6–1, 28 KOs) in a title eliminator. The bout was confirmed on 28 September. Originally the fight was supposed to take place on 28 October in Stuttgart, however the fight's date was postponed to 18 November and the location was changed to Düsseldorf after Ruiz and his team filed a complaint, pointing out that Universum Box-Promotion could not schedule a fight within 45 days from the day of winning the fight's auction. Known for defeating Evander Holyfield, Hasim Rahman and unbeaten Kirk Johnson (32–0–1, 23 KOs), Ruiz was coming off of a razor-thin decision loss of his WBA world heavyweight title to Nikolai Valuev, in a fight Ruiz believed he had done enough to be declared the winner. Coming into the bout, Ruiz changed his head coach from Norman Stone to Manny Siaca Sr. In the build-up, both Ruiz and Siaca talked about improvements Ruiz made during training camp and that the public was going to see a new and better version of him in the fight. Siaca also expressed his belief that "Johnny Ruiz will become the world heavyweight champion again. I'd bet my life on it."

From the opening bell, both boxers fought at a high pace, with Chagaev attempting to bob and weave while Ruiz tried to come forward, work behind the jab and clinch when in close range. From the third round, Chagaev started dictating the action, moving in and out of range, hurting Ruiz and throwing him out of position several times and successfully deflecting Ruiz's attempts to tie him up and smother in a clinch. Going into the championship rounds, Ruiz was finally finding some success as Chagaev seemingly slowed down, however Chagaev had the upper hand in the second half of the eleventh and in the twelfth round, raising his arms in celebration after the bell rang. Ultimately Chagaev took a split decision with scores of 117–111 and 116–112 in his favor, and 115–114 for Ruiz. Both American and Eastern European media expressed criticism over a 115–114 score. The Boston Globe had Chagaev winning 116–112. "I had many difficult fights in my career, but Ruiz was probably my most difficult win. The difficulty came from the fact that it was a title eliminator. The American had a lot more experience than I had, and that gave him a major psychological advantage", Chagaev later said about the fight. Chagaev became the mandatory challenger for a shot at Nikolai Valuev, the WBA heavyweight champion at the time. Valuev was sat ringside and believed Chagaev was the rightful winner. At the conclusion of 2006, Chagaev was ranked No.9 heavyweight in the world by The Ring; Nikolai Valuev was ranked 8th; John Ruiz was ranked 10th.

=== 2007–2009: WBA heavyweight champion ===
==== Chagaev vs. Valuev ====
Chagaev eventually reached agreement to fight WBA world heavyweight champion Nikolai Valuev on 14 April 2007 at the Porsche-Arena in Stuttgart, Germany. This was Valuev's fourth title defense, previously beating Owen Beck, Monte Barrett and Jameel McCline by stoppage and expressing interest in fighting the then-IBF world heavyweight champion Wladimir Klitschko in a unification showdown in the near future. With a record of 46–0, 34 KOs, Valuev was three wins away from matching Rocky Marciano's 49–0 undefeated record. Going into the fight, Valuev, who was standing at 2.13 metres (7.0 ft) and was taller than Chagaev by 28 centimetres (0.92 ft), was viewed as a heavy favorite, with bookmakers accepting bets on his victory with a coefficient of 1.2. During training camp, Chagaev's trainer Michael Timm had a special podium built, on which he stood up so Chagaev could get used to punching up to someone with a big height advantage. Most of his sparring partners, such as Julius Long, were between 2.00 metres (6.56 ft) and 2.16 metres (7.1 ft) tall. Timm also had a Panasonic TV with a 2.5 m diagonal installed so they could study Valuev's style in full size. Valuev's training camp was held in Saint Petersburg and Kienbaum. For the fight, Chagaev weighed in at 228.25 lbs; he was outweighed by 90.75 pounds (41 kg). The bout main-evented a card televised by Das Erste.

From the first round, Chagaev used his speed, footwork and understanding of positioning to nullify Valuev's size advantage, successfully bobbing and weaving, slipping under Valuev's jab and going back-and-forth between moving to the left and right to confuse Valuev with his movement. Chagaev became more aggressive in the middle rounds, going more often to the body to make his left hooks to the head less readable. Between the tenth and eleventh rounds, Valuev's coach Manvel Gabrielyan was visibly angry with his boxer's reluctance to throw more punches, particularly a straight right, threatening to "throw a bottle" at Valuev and leave the ring if Valuev didn't step up his aggression; however, Valuev's attempts to be more aggressive and finish the match inside the distance seemed to have little effect as Chagaev won most of the exchanges and often caught Valuev on counterattacks. Chagaev won the fight and WBA title via a majority decision (117–111, 115–113 and 114–114). Many ringside had the fight close and some calling it controversial, while other believed the decision was too generous towards Valuev. Neither Valuev nor Wilfred Sauerland protested the decision. With the win, Chagaev became the first Asian to win a world heavyweight title. Chagaev dedicated his victory to the President of Uzbekistan Islam Karimov. The bout averaged 7.57 million viewers with 39.3 market share on Das Erste.

Later in an interview, Chagaev described his arrival to Uzbekistan after winning the title: "I was welcomed as a national hero. When I was a kid I saw Soviet films about how astronauts were welcomed in Moscow but who would've thought I would receive similar treatment one day in my home? At the ladder of a plane that brought us to Tashkent, a red carpet was laid down. The amount of people that were at the airport was crazy. I was put in the government's cabriolet and taken to the presidential residence. Along the road there were dozens of people that formed a corridor and were chanting my name. All this time, to be honest, I was in some kind of numbness, because I never expected something like this, especially since it was 11 p.m. The Prime Minister, the Mayor of Tashkent, the Minister of Sports, and many other government officials came to the residence for a gala dinner in honor of my victory. The next day I was accepted by the President Islam Karimov. He awarded me with the Order of Outstanding Merit, my promoter Klaus-Peter Kohl received the Jasorat (Bravery) Medal, my manager Taimaz Niyazov received the Shuhrat (Glory) Medal. Then we all laid flowers at the Monument to the Independence and Humanism, met with children from sports schools, and in the evening a grandiose concert was held at the stadium of the National Bank of Uzbekistan. I was also given keys from Daewoo Lacetti, these are produced at a join Uzbek-Korean factory in Andijan. [...] I couldn't even get to my house because I was taken straight to the residence from the airport. They explained that if they took me home, people would simply tear me to pieces: there were too many people who wanted to congratulate me on my victory." Chagaev's story was confirmed by the footage provided by CNN.

When being asked about his future plans, Chagaev stated: "My second son is going to be born in August. It will give me a motivational boost. I want to become the undisputed heavyweight champion. Wladimir Klitschko is yet to answer my callout. Hopefully I'll be able to achieve my dream."

==== Cancelled unification bout vs. Ibragimov ====
Shortly after winning the title, Chagaev signed the contract to face then-WBO world heavyweight champion Sultan Ibragimov in a unification showdown that would take place in Moscow on 13 October 2007. When talking about negotiations, president of Seminole Warriors Boxing promotion company Leon Margules described them as "the easiest negotiations of his career", praising both Ibragimov and Chagaev for being straightforward during the negotiation process. He also predicted the winner of this fight to eventually become the undisputed heavyweight champion. It was going to be the first heavyweight unification fight since 1999 and the third boxing event considered major for Moscow since WBC world heavyweight champion Oleg Maskaev defended his title against Okello Peter and heavyweight contender Alexander Povetkin faced fringe contender Larry Donald. On 31 July 2007, it was officially announced that the unification showdown was cancelled due to Chagaev suffering from an aggravation of gastric problems. Instead, former undisputed heavyweight champion Evander Holyfield agreed to step in as a last-minute replacement. It was later discovered that Chagaev had contracted hepatitis B. At that point, it was not clear whether he would have been able to compete at all, with WBA considering a championship tournament for Chagaev's crown. After Ibragimov defended his crown against Holyfield, however, it was announced that Chagaev was able to recover.

==== Chagaev vs. Skelton ====
On 5 December, Chagaev's first official defence was confirmed to be against Commonwealth heavyweight champion Matt Skelton (21–1, 18 KOs), who was ranked No.15 contender by the WBA at the time of the announcement, on 19 January 2008 at the Burg-Waechter Castello in Düsseldorf. Skelton's promoter Frank Warren initially wanted the fight to take place in February or March, but Chagaev insisted an earlier date. In regard to fighting Skelton, Chagaev said, "I am completely healthy and I am ready to fight, I want to get in the ring. It will be a hard fight against a good puncher." Skelton did not show up to the final press-conference in Düsseldorf, claiming he wanted to spend some extra time at home and mentally prepare himself for the biggest fight of his career; this upset Chagaev who believed Skelton was afraid to face him.

The fight was marred with a lot of excessive clinching and holding initiated by Skelton, with The Daily Telegraph reporting that the fight was "for long periods more akin to a couple of stags wrestling for supremacy", and little involvement from the referee, who only deducted a point from Skelton in the eighth round. Before the final round, Skelton's coach Kevin Sanders told his boxer that this had been the best performance in his career. Despite this, Chagaev retained his WBA title via unanimous decision, with the judges scoring the fight 117–110, 117–111 and 117–111 in Chagaev's favour.

His next mandatory defense was to be a rematch on 5 July 2008 with Nikolai Valuev, who defeated former WBO champion Sergei Liakhovich by unanimous decision to earn the right. However, the fight had to be cancelled after Chagaev suffered a complete tear of an Achilles tendon during his final sparring session in preparation for the defense, causing Chagaev's second postponement of the match. The WBA elected to make Chagaev "Champion in Recess" due to the injury that Chagaev sustained and necessary recovery time and mandated that top-contenders Valuev and John Ruiz meet for the vacated title. By beating Ruiz, Valuev also became champion on 30 August 2008.

==== Chagaev vs. Drumond ====
Chagaev returned from injury on 7 February 2009 to fight the then-unbeaten Costa Rican Carl Davis Drumond. The bout was announced on 11 December 2008. Drumond was ranked No.9 contender by the WBA at the time of the fight's announcement. For the fight, Chagaev was not listed as WBA champion, but rather the "Champion in Recess". The fight took place at the StadtHalle in Rostock. Chagaev sustained a cut from an unintentional clash of heads in the third round. The fight ended after round 6, with Chagaev winning the fight via technical decision. Chagaev was taken to hospital after the fight for treatment. Judge Jean-Louis Legland had Chagaev ahead 60–54, whilst judges Hector Afu and Paul Thomas had Chagaev ahead 58–56.

Chagaev and Valuev were supposed to fight no later than 26 June 2009 to determine who the WBA regarded as their champion. They were scheduled to fight on 30 May 2009 in Helsinki, Finland at the Hartwall Arena, but Chagaev failed a Finnish medical test, allegedly due to hepatitis.

==== Chagaev vs. Klitschko ====
Unified world heavyweight champion Wladimir Klitschko was scheduled to face David Haye on 20 June 2009, but Haye pulled out within weeks of the fight complaining of a back injury. Chagaev agreed to step in for Haye as a last-minute replacement. The winner would take the vacant Ring magazine heavyweight title in the battle between their number 1 ranked heavyweight, Klitschko, and third ranked Chagaev. Klitschko was defending his IBF, WBO and IBO heavyweight titles. Chagaev's WBA champion in recess title was not on the line. The Ring's pre-fight comparison gave Chagaev the edge on defense, praising him for his fundamentals and footwork, and thought he had a stronger chin. It gave Klitschko the advantage in power, speed, athletic ability and experience.

The fight took place at Veltins Arena in Gelsenkirchen. With over 61,000 fans attending the fight it was the largest audience for a boxing match in Germany since 1939, when Max Schmeling knocked out Adolf Heuser in front of 70,000 people in Stuttgart. Klitschko dominated the fight, keeping Chagaev at the end of his jab and throwing straight right hand whenever necessary. Klitschko dropped Chagaev near the end of the second round and was gradually fighting more aggressively as the fight progressed. Chagaev's trainer Michael Timm did not allow Chagaev to come out for the tenth round, prompting the referee to wave the bout off, declaring Klitschko the winner by corner retirement (RTD). On 24 July 2009, when the WBA published their Official Ratings as of June 2009, Chagaev was no longer the "Champion in Recess" but the No. 1 challenger instead.

=== 2010–11: Regaining composure ===
Chagaev fought Kali Meehan (35–3, 29 KO) on 22 May 2010, in a WBA heavyweight title eliminator at the Stadthalle in Rostock, Mecklenburg-Vorpommern, Germany. A professional fighter since 1997, Meehan was on a six-fight winning streak coming into the fight, winning all by knockout and all but one inside three rounds. Nevertheless, the fight was criticized, with some observers believing Meehan did not deserve to be ranked No. 2 contender by a major organization and that the disparity in skills was too wide for the fight to be competitive; despite this, Meehan was believed to go into the later rounds.

The first round was mostly characterized by a positional battle, with Meehan trying to keep Chagaev at the end of his jab and Chagaev studying his opponent. Chagaev got in control after the second round, hurting Meehan twice with the left hook and continuing to increasingly crack Meehan's defense as the fight progressed. By the fifth round Meehan seldom threw meaningful punches, spending most of the time defending himself. Every time Meehan was hurt, Chagaev attempted to fight inside to try to finish his opponent, a move he was criticized for as Meehan would tie him up whenever he was trying to close distance. Chagaev slowed down his pace after the seventh round, which Meehan tried to take advantage of and fought more aggressively in the eighth, however Chagaev regained control of the fight in the ninth. By the last round both fighters appeared tired, with Meehan trying to catch Chagaev with a powerful shot, but his attacks were too readable for Chagaev. Ultimately Chagaev was awarded a unanimous decision victory with the scores of 117–111, 117–112 and 118–110.

Six months later in a stay-busy fight, he defeated Travis Walker via unanimous decision in an eight-round fight which turned into a slugfest.

==== Chagaev vs. Povetkin ====
After Wladimir Klitschko unified his WBO and IBF titles with David Haye's WBA title, Klitschko was upgraded to "Super Champion" by the WBA, thus making the "Regular Champion" title vacant. On 6 July 2011 negotiations for Chagaev to fight Russian heavyweight contender Alexander Povetkin (21–0, 15 KOs) for the vacant title began between Sauerland, who promote Povetkin, and Chagaev's promoter Universum. Two days later, Povetkin's trainer confirmed the fight would take place on 27 August. At the time of the bout, Chagaev was ranked No.4 heavyweight contender by The Ring, while Povetkin was ranked No.3 contender by the same publication. There were concerns about Chagaev's health state, due to him being diagnosed with hepatitis B and the possibility of him infecting Povetkin. Chagaev, however, insisted that the medical examination had confirmed that his opponents (Povetkin included) weren't in danger of being infected. Most observers expected the fight to be close, giving Chagaev an advantage in experience, while also giving Povetkin the edge in youth and athletic ability. Both fighters were given an even chance to win.

Both fighters were active from the opening bell, with Povetkin having the upper hand in the first half of the fight, frequently closing the distance and overwhelming Chagaev with pressure, while blocking most Chagaev's shots with arms and gloves. Povetkin staggered Chagaev with an uppercut in the third round. Chagaev regained composure in the middle rounds, hurting tired Povetkin several times with clubbing left hooks. Povetkin withstood Chagaev's attacks and re-established his pressure going into the championship rounds, while Chagaev appeared to be saving energy for the last rounds. The twelfth round saw both fighters trading shots. The bout went full twelve rounds, with Povetkin being declared the winner by unanimous decision. The scores were 116–112 (twice) and 117–113, all in favor of Povetkin. According to CompuBox, Povetkin landed 152 punches out of 533 thrown (28.5%) with 112 landed power shots (39.6%), while Chagaev landed 72 punches out of 416 thrown (17.1%) with 62 power punches (35.2%).

=== 2012–16: WBA Regular champion ===
After the Povetkin bout, Chagaev went 5–0 (3 KO), defeating world ranked Jovo Pudar & four journeymen with respectable records.

On 15 June 2013, at a press conference in Sofia, Bulgaria, European heavyweight champion Kubrat Pulev (17–0, 9 KOs) stated his plans to fight Chagaev next although details had not been discussed. Towards the end of the month, Chagaev spoke out denying any rumours that he was interested in a fight with Pulev. He instead stated that he was closing in on a deal to fight undefeated Cuban Luis Otiz (19–0, 16 KOs) in the fall of 2013.

==== Chagaev vs. Oquendo ====
In May 2014, talks began for a fight between Chagaev and former world title challenger Fres Oquendo (37–7, 24 KOs) for the vacant WBA "regular" heavyweight title in June. Oquendo climbed the WBA rankings further after stopping Galen Brown (41–27–1, 24 KOs) in two rounds earlier in the month. Oquendo pulled out in July due to passport issues and was on the verge of being replaced by German boxer Alexander Petkovic (49–4–4, 27 KOs), however Oquendo managed to board a plane, confirming the bout was still on. The fight took place on 6 July at the Ahmat Arena in Grozny. Chagaev claimed the vacant title via majority decision after 12 rounds in a tough battle. Judge Guillermo Perez Pineda scored the fight 114–114, whilst judges Gustavo Jarquin and Alexis Marin both scored it 115–113 in favour of Chagaev, giving him the win. Chagaev controlled most of the fight with his constant jab and later in the fight started connecting with body shots. A few days after the fight, the WBA ordered Chagaev vs. Ortiz. Both camps had 30 days to negotiate a deal.

In November 2014, Oquendo spoke out about not receiving his guaranteed purse of $1 million and an immediate rematch within 120 days if he lost. His promoters Hitz Boxing and Square Ring Promotions, who were guaranteed an additional $100,000 were also reportedly not paid. Bobby Hitz of Hitz Boxing stated that they would file a lawsuit. In the same month, RUSADA released information from a mandatory drug test that was taken after the fight which stated that Oquendo had tested positive for tamoxifen and anastrozole. According to the fight contract, this meant Oquendo would need to pay back his purse. In December, a $5 million lawsuit was filed by Oquendo against promoter Terek Box Event seeking damages caused by the agreement to the Federal Court in Manhattan. In a statement, Oquendo said, “I am really looking forward to my day in court and finally getting justice. These guys pulled a really slick move and tricked me into fighting on July 6 by promising me to increase my purse to $1 million and giving me a rematch at a time when I wasn't mentally right, with my wife and newborn baby being sick and in the hospital. Well, now they are the ones behind the eight ball. They've got until January 2 to respond to the lawsuit.” In April 2015, the judges issued an injunction.

==== Chagaev vs. Pianeta ====
In May 2015, it was announced that Chagaev would make his first title defense against long time contender WBA #13 Francesco Pianeta (31–1, 17 KOs) on 11 July at the GETEC Arena in Magdeburg, Germany. Pianeta's only loss came in 2013 to Wladimir Klitschko via stoppage. World of Boxing president Andrey Ryabinsky helped settle the issue between Chagaev and Oquendo. With the legal battle finished, it was said that Oquendo would fight the winner of Chagaev vs. Pianeta. Chagaev won the fight via 1st-round TKO. Pianeta was dropped with two lefts but beat the 10 count. He was then dropped again following two more lefts. Referee Jean-Louis Legland stopped the fight 3 seconds before the round was due to end.

Chagaev and Oquendo were scheduled to have their rematch on 17 October at the Sparkassen Arena in Kiel, Germany. On 6 October, Oquendo pulled out of the fight citing illness.

==== Chagaev vs. Browne ====
On 14 November 2015, the WBA ordered Chagaev to reach a deal to make a defence of his WBA title against Australian heavyweight contender Lucas Browne. The two sides had until 30 November to reach a deal. Chagaev's promoter Timur Dugazaev announced the fight would likely take place in Grozny in March 2016. In the January 2016, the fight was officially announced to take place on 5 March. Browne won the fight by stopping Chagaev in the tenth round. Browne landed nearly 20 unanswered punches, mostly right hands, before referee Stanley Christodoulou stopped the fight at 2 minutes, 27 seconds. Browne was knocked down in the sixth round and at the time of the knockout, behind on all judges scorecards (81–88, 82–88 twice).

It was reported on 22 March 2016 that Browne failed his post-fight drug test and was then stripped of the belt. Chagaev was reinstated as WBA (Regular) Champion, though the loss remained on his record.

On 28 July, it was reported that Chagaev had been stripped of his WBA (Regular) title for failure to pay outstanding sanctioning fees. According to WBA, Chagaev and promoter Timur Dugazaev have repeatedly failed to pay $40,750 in sanctioning fees related to Chagaev's majority decision victory against Fres Oquendo. The WBA said it sought payment multiple times and had no choice but to vacate the title when there was no response.

=== Retirement ===
It was announced on 28 July 2016 by manager Timur Dugashev that Chagaev announced his retirement from boxing at the age of 37 due to problems with his eyes. Dugashev stated: "Ruslan informed us that he would no longer fight. The reason is the state of his eyes. Health is the most important thing." According to Chagaev's wife, however, Chagaev decided to retire because he was no longer motivated to step in the ring and that his fight with Browne was going to be his last no matter the outcome.

There were reports in October 2016 that Chagaev was offered a farewell fight to close his career, potentially a rematch with Lucas Browne. Chagaev chose to stay retired due to health issues.

== Personal life ==
Chagaev is of Volga Tatar ethnicity and an adherent of Islam. His parents, Shamil and Zamira Chagaev, are Mishar Tatars from the Tatar village of Kalda (located in today's Baryshsky District of Ulyanovsk Oblast, Russia), who moved to the Uzbek SSR in the 1950s. Chagaev has a sister, Luiza. He is married to Viktoria, an ethnic Armenian, who is also from Andijan. They have three children together: Artur (named after his friend Artur Grigorian), Alan and Adam. Their first son, Artur, was born on 24 March 2004, and played American football for Spanish River High School and Boca Raton High School, later attending the University of Florida.

Around the time shortly after winning the world title, several news reported that Chagaev was having an affair with Gulnara Karimova, daughter of the Uzbek President Islam Karimov. An anonymous source claimed that Karimova pressured Chagaev to divorce his then-wife and marry her, and on 18 October 2007 a website CentreAsia published news that Chagaev divorced his wife on 26 September; the website showed photos of documents published by the tabloid Darakchi to confirm those rumors. Shortly afterwards Chagaev and Karimova scheduled a wedding date, however shortly before the date Ruslan, Viktoria and their kids left Uzbekistan and moved to Germany where Ruslan and Viktoria remarried. This resulted in the government taking his portraits away from all places and Uzbek media being forbidden to mention Chagaev in any form. Currently Ruslan resides in Hamburg, Germany with his family.

Chagaev is a fan of Schalke 04. Before his first title defense against Matt Skelton, Chagaev visited Schalke's training center. The team's head coach Mirko Slomka offered his players to train while using exercises typical for boxers. At the end of the training, Chagaev had a sparring session with its main squad players, particularly Gerald Asamoah and Marcelo Bordon. Prior to his showdown with Wladimir Klitschko, Chagaev became an official member of its fan club. He also publicly received its home shirt from the club's president Josef Schnusenberg.

== Professional boxing record ==
39 fights	34 wins	3 losses
By knockout	21	2
By decision	13	1
Draws	1	
No contests	1	

No.	Result	Record	Opponent	Type	Round, time	Date	Location	Notes
38	Loss	34–3–1	Lucas Browne	TKO	10 (12), 2:02	5 Mar 2016	Colosseum Sport Hall, Grozny, Russia	Lost WBA (Regular) heavyweight title; Chagaev was reinstated as champion after Browne failed a drug test, but the loss was upheld
37	Win	34–2–1	Francesco Pianeta	TKO	1 (12), 2:57	11 Jul 2015	GETEC Arena, Magdeburg, Germany	Retained WBA (Regular) heavyweight title
36	Win	33–2–1	Fres Oquendo	MD	12	6 Jul 2014	Akhmat-Arena, Grozny, Russia	Won vacant WBA (Regular) heavyweight title
35	Win	32–2–1	Jovo Pudar	UD	12	5 Oct 2013	Olympic Stadium, Moscow, Russia	Won vacant WBA Continental (Europe) and PABA heavyweight titles
34	Win	31–2–1	Mike Sheppard	KO	1 (10), 1:40	22 Mar 2013	Universal Hall, Berlin, Germany	
33	Win	30–2–1	Werner Kreiskott	TKO	7 (8), 0:14	1 Sep 2012	König Pilsener Arena, Oberhausen, Germany	
32	Win	29–2–1	Billy Zumbrun	TKO	3 (8), 1:26	21 Apr 2012	Sport- und Kongresshalle, Schwerin, Germany	
31	Win	28–2–1	Kertson Manswell	UD	8	28 Jan 2012	Grand Elysée Rotherbaum, Hamburg, Germany	
30	Loss	27–2–1	Alexander Povetkin	UD	12	27 Aug 2011	Messe, Erfurt, Germany	For inaugural WBA (Regular) heavyweight title
29	Win	27–1–1	Travis Walker	UD	8	19 Nov 2010	Universum Gym, Hamburg, Germany	
28	Win	26–1–1	Kali Meehan	UD	12	22 May 2010	StadtHalle, Rostock, Germany	
27	Loss	25–1–1	Wladimir Klitschko	RTD	9 (12), 3:00	20 Jun 2009	Veltins-Arena, Gelsenkirchen, Germany	For IBF, WBO, IBO, and vacant The Ring heavyweight titles
26	Win	25–0–1	Carl Davis Drumond	TD	6 (12), 3:00	7 Feb 2009	StadtHalle, Rostock, Germany	Unanimous TD: Chagaev cut from an accidental head clash
25	Win	24–0–1	Matt Skelton	UD	12	19 Jan 2008	Burg-Wächter Castello, Düsseldorf, Germany	Retained WBA heavyweight title
24	Win	23–0–1	Nikolai Valuev	MD	12	14 Apr 2007	Porsche-Arena, Stuttgart, Germany	Won WBA heavyweight title
23	Win	22–0–1	John Ruiz	SD	12	18 Nov 2006	Burg-Wächter Castello, Düsseldorf, Germany	
22	Win	21–0–1	Michael Sprott	TKO	8 (12), 2:54	15 Jul 2006	Color Line Arena, Hamburg, Germany	Retained WBA Inter-Continental heavyweight title; Won WBO Asia-Pacific heavyweight title
21	Win	20–0–1	Volodymyr Virchis	MD	12	11 Mar 2006	Color Line Arena, Hamburg, Germany	Won WBA and WBO Inter-Continental heavyweight titles
20	Win	19–0–1	Rob Calloway	KO	2 (10), 2:10	7 Jan 2006	Zenith, Munich, Germany	
19	Win	18–0–1	Mark Krence	KO	5 (8), 1:28	22 Oct 2005	Brandberge Arena, Halle, Germany	
18	Win	17–0–1	Jucimar Francisco Hipolito	TKO	1 (8), 0:50	28 Sep 2005	Color Line Arena, Hamburg, Germany	
17	Win	16–0–1	Sherman Williams	UD	8	26 Mar 2005	Erdgas Arena, Riesa, Germany	
16	Win	15–0–1	Tommy Connelly	TKO	2 (8), 1:51	14 Dec 2004	Freizeit Arena, Sölden, Austria	
15	Win	14–0–1	Asmir Vojnovic	TKO	4 (10), 0:45	16 Nov 2004	Kugelbake-Halle, Cuxhaven, Germany	
14	Win	13–0–1	Willie Williams	KO	3 (8), 2:25	26 Oct 2004	Scandlines Arena, Rostock, Germany	
13	Win	12–0–1	Garing Lane	KO	5 (8), 1:46	31 Jul 2004	Hanns-Martin-Schleyer-Halle, Stuttgart, Germany	
12	Win	11–0–1	Sedreck Fields	KO	2 (8), 2:45	22 Jun 2004	Sportzentrum, Telfs, Austria	
11	Win	10–0–1	Wade Lewis	TKO	1 (6), 2:33	18 May 2004	Hansehalle, Lübeck, Germany	
10	Win	9–0–1	Alexey Varakin	KO	2 (6)	30 Mar 2004	Saaltheater Geulen, Aachen, Germany	
9	Win	8–0–1	Sedreck Fields	UD	6	17 Feb 2004	Hansehalle, Lübeck, Germany	
8	Win	7–0–1	Daniel Frank	KO	2 (6), 0:54	8 Nov 2003	Universum Gym, Hamburg, Germany	
7	Win	6–0–1	Zakeem Graham	TKO	3 (10), 2:26	22 May 2003	Raceway, Yonkers, New York, US	
6	Draw	5–0–1	Rob Calloway	TD	3 (10), 2:41	5 Oct 2002	Cobo Hall, Detroit, Michigan, US	Calloway cut from an accidental head clash
5	Win	5–0	Chris Isaac	UD	8	11 May 2002	Grand Casino, Biloxi, Mississippi, US	
4	Win	4–0	Val Smith	KO	1 (4), 2:26	14 Jan 2002	The Joint, Paradise, Nevada, US	
3	Win	3–0	Everett Martin	TKO	4 (4)	21 Sep 2001	Sport Palace Yunusabad, Tashkent, Uzbekistan	
2	Win	2–0	Brian Jones	KO	2 (4), 1:10	3 Sep 1997	Ramada Inn, Rosemont, Illinois, US	
1	Win	1–0	Donnie Penelton	KO	1 (4), 2:30	21 Aug 1997	Hollywood Casino, Aurora, Illinois, US	

== Viewership ==
=== Germany ===
Date	Fight	Viewership (avg.)	Network	Source(s)
11 March 2006	Ruslan Chagaev vs. Volodymyr Virchis	1,590,000	ZDF	
14 April 2007	Nikolai Valuev vs. Ruslan Chagaev	7,570,000	Das Erste	
19 January 2008	Ruslan Chagaev vs. Matt Skelton	4,420,000	ZDF	
7 February 2009	Ruslan Chagaev vs. Carl Davis Drumond	3,860,000	ZDF	
20 July 2009	Wladimir Klitschko vs. Ruslan Chagaev	10,390,000	RTL Television	
22 May 2010	Ruslan Chagaev vs. Kali Meehan	3,100,000	ZDF	
27 August 2011	Ruslan Chagaev vs. Alexander Povetkin	3,350,000	Das Erste	
11 July 2015	Ruslan Chagaev vs. Francesco Pianeta	2,060,000	Sat.1	
	Total viewership	36,340,000		

== See also ==
- List of world heavyweight boxing champions
- List of WBA world champions
- List of southpaw stance boxers

Sporting positions
Regional boxing titles
Preceded by Volodymyr Virchis	WBA Inter-Continental heavyweight champion 11 March 2006 – 15 July 2006; Vacated	Vacant Title next held by Taras Bidenko
Preceded by Volodymyr Virchis	WBO Inter-Continental heavyweight champion 11 March 2006 – April 2006; Vacated	Vacant Title next held by Alexander Dimitrenko
Vacant Title last held by Sultan Ibragimov	WBO Asia Pacific heavyweight champion 15 July 2006 – March 2007; Vacated	Vacant Title next held by Denis Bakhtov
New title	WBA Continental (Europe) heavyweight champion 5 October 2013 – 6 July 2014; Won world title	Vacant Title next held by Otto Wallin
Preceded by Jovo Pudar	PABA heavyweight champion 5 October 2013 – 5 July 2014; Vacated	Vacant Title next held by Joseph Parker
World boxing titles
Preceded by Nikolai Valuev	WBA heavyweight champion 14 April 2007 – 18 July 2008; Status changed	Vacant Title next held by Nikolai Valuev
Vacant Title last held by Alexander Povetkin	WBA heavyweight champion Regular title 6 July 2014 – 5 March 2016	Succeeded by Lucas Browne
Vacant Title last held by Lucas Browne	WBA heavyweight champion Regular title 12 May 2016 – 25 July 2016; Stripped	Vacant Title next held by Mahmoud Charr
Honorary boxing titles
Vacant Title next held by Roy Jones Jr.	WBA heavyweight champion In recess 18 July 2008 – 20 June 2009; Stripped	Vacant Title next held by Mahmoud Charr
