= Wladimir Klitschko vs. Ruslan Chagaev =

Boxing competition

Knockout Auf Schalke
- Date: 20 June 2009
- Venue: Veltins-Arena, Gelsenkirchen, Nordrhein-Westfalen, Germany
- Title(s) on the line: IBF, WBO, IBO and vacant The Ring heavyweight titles

Tale of the tape
| Boxer | Wladimir Klitschko | Ruslan Chagaev |
| Nickname | Dr. Steelhammer | White Tyson |
| Hometown | Kyiv, Ukraine | Andijan, Andijan Region, Uzbekistan |
| Pre-fight record | 52–3 (45 KO) | 25–0–1 (17 KO) |
| Age | 33 years, 2 months | 30 years, 8 months |
| Height | 6 ft 6 in (198 cm) | 6 ft 1 in (185 cm) |
| Weight | 240 1/4 lb (109 kg) | 224 3/4 lb (102 kg) |
| Style | Orthodox | Southpaw |
| Recognition | IBF, WBO and IBO; Heavyweight Champion; The Ring; No. 1 Ranked Heavyweight | WBA; Heavyweight Champion "in recess" The Ring; No. 3 Ranked Heavyweight |

Result
- Klitschko defeated Chagaev by 9th round corner retirement

Wladimir Klitschko vs. Ruslan Chagaev, billed as Knockout Auf Schalke, was a professional boxing match contested on 20 June 2009 for the IBF, WBO, IBO, and vacant The Ring heavyweight championship.

== Background ==
Chagaev had won the WBA title from Nikolay Valuev in April 2007 by a majority decision. His scheduled rematch with Valeuv was twice cancelled due a viral infection and a torn Achilles tendon both suffered by Chagaev. After the second cancellation the WBA named Chagaev their "Champion In recess." The rematch was scheduled for a third time on 30 May 2009, but Chagaev failed his medical exam.

After he had successfully unified the IBF and WBO belt with his outsided decision victory over Sultan Ibragimov in February 2008, Wladimir Klitschko had defended his titles with knockouts of Tony Thompson and former unified champion Hasim Rahman. He had agreed to face former unified cruiserweight champion David Haye in Germany on 20 June 2009, but Haye withdrew because of a back injury.

Immediately after news about Haye's injury broke into public, a handful of heavyweight fighters, such as Alexander Povetkin, Chazz Witherspoon, James Toney, Odlanier Solis, Dominick Guinn and Eddie Chambers, expressed their interest in replacing Haye for the Klitschko showdown. Instead, Klitschko's team started negotiations with Ruslan Chagaev, who was ranked third best heavyweight in the world by The Ring, and WBA world champion Nikolai Valuev, who was regarded as a big draw in Germany at the time. Ultimately, Klitschko reached agreements with Chagaev who agreed to step in for Haye as a last-minute replacement (Valuev's team wanted the fight to be postponed until autumn of that year). Some observers believed that Chagaev was a better challenge for Klitschko than Haye, given his position in the ranking and the fact that, alongside WBO and IBF world titles, vacant The Ring world heavyweight title was also on the line. In the pre-fight comparison, The Ring was giving Klitschko an advantage in power, speed and athletic ability, as well as experience, while also crediting Chagaev for having better defence, praising him for his fundamentals and footwork. In terms of technique, both fighters were described as of equal level.

== The fight ==
Veltins-Arena with capacity of over 61,000 seats was sold out, making the audience the biggest for boxing in Germany since 1939, when Max Schmeling knocked out Adolf Heuser in front of 70,000 people in Stuttgart. Klitschko dominated the fight, keeping Chagaev at the end of his jab and throwing straight right hand whenever necessary. Klitschko dropped Chagaev near the end of the second round, and was gradually fighting more aggressively as the fight progressed. Chagaev's trainer Michael Timm did not allow Chagaev to come out for the tenth round, prompting the referee to wave the bout off, declaring Klitschko the winner by corner retirement (RTD).

== Aftermath ==
This win was significant for Klitschko because even though the WBA title was not on the line, many saw Klitschko as the rightful champion. Immediately after this bout Chagaev would lose his "Champion In recess" status and would not fight for eleven months. Klitschko would make two defences, one against Eddie Chambers and the other one a rematch with former WBC champion Samuel Peter, before a unification bout with then WBA beltholder David Haye in July 2011.

== Fight card ==
Confirmed bouts:

| Weight Class | Weight | | vs. | | Method | Round | Time | Notes |
|---|---|---|---|---|---|---|---|---|
| Heavyweight | Unlimited | (Ukraine) Wladimir Klitschko (c) | def. | (Uzbekistan) Ruslan Chagaev | RTD | 9/12 | 3:00 | ^{Note 1} |
| Heavyweight | Unlimited | (Russia) Alexander Ustinov | def. | (United Kingdom) Michael Sprott | UD | 12/12 |
| Heavyweight | Unlimited | (United States) Johnathon Banks | def. | (United Kingdom) Paul Butlin | TKO | 7/8 | 0:56 |
| Middleweight | 154 lb | (Republic of Ireland) Andy Lee | def. | (Latvia) Olegs Fedotovs | UD | 6/6 |
| Heavyweight | Unlimited | (United States) Cedric Boswell | def. | (Turkey) Serdar Uysal | TKO | 6/6 |

^Note 1 For WBO, IBF and vacant The Ring and lineal heavyweight titles.

== Broadcasting ==
The fight averaged 10.34 million viewers (50.2 market share) and peaked at 11.16 million on RTL, becoming the sixth most-watched television broadcast of 2009 in Germany.

| Country | Broadcaster |
|---|---|
| Australia | Main Event |
| Canada | TSN |
| Germany | RTL |
| Philippines | Solar Sports |
| Russia | Channel One |
| Ukraine | Inter |
| United Kingdom | Sky Sports |
| United States | ESPN Classic |

| Preceded by vs. Hasim Rahman | Wladimir Klitschko's bouts 20 June 2009 | Succeeded by vs. Eddie Chambers |
| Preceded by vs. Carl Davis Drumond | Ruslan Chagaev's bouts 20 June 2009 | Succeeded by vs. Kali Meehan |
