= Alex Leapai =

Australian professional boxer

Personal information
- Nickname: The Lionheart
- Nationality: Australian
- Born: Elise Leapai; 16 October 1979 (age 47) Lauli'i, Upolu, Western Samoa
- Height: 1.83 m (6 ft 0 in)
- Weight: Heavyweight

Boxing career
- Reach: 190 cm (75 in)
- Stance: Orthodox

Boxing record
- Total fights: 44
- Wins: 32
- Win by KO: 26
- Losses: 8
- Draws: 4

Elise Leapai (born 16 October 1979) is a Samoan-Australian former professional boxer who competed from 2004 to 2019. He challenged once for the unified WBA (Super), IBF, WBO, IBO, The Ring magazine heavyweight titles in 2014.

== Early life ==
Leapai's parents, Faataui and Leitu, moved their family from Laulii, Samoa when he was 7 to New Zealand, where they lived until he was 12. In New Zealand, Leapai attended Owairaka Primary School in Mt Albert and played rugby league for Marist Saints, as did his one-time sparring partner Sonny Bill Williams. Upon moving to Australia, Leapai's family settled in Logan, Queensland. In Logan, Leapai played junior rugby league for Logan Brothers alongside future Australian rugby league and rugby union international Lote Tuqiri. While playing for Brothers, Leapai was offered a scholarship with the National Rugby League side, the North Queensland Cowboys.

Leapai has four brothers, Leati, Stefano and Faatni (known as Leroy), who spent four years with the London Broncos in the Super League. His cousin is Australia and Queensland representative Josh Papalii.

== Professional career ==
Alex Leapai defeated Denis Boytsov on 23 November 2013 in Germany. Boytsov was the WBO's mandatory challenger for Wladimir Klitschko, but when Leapai defeated Boytsov, Leapai was named mandatory challenger even though the Boytsov-Leapai bout was not an official elimination bout.

Dan Rafael for ESPN.com reported on 3 February 2014 that "Heavyweight champion Wladimir Klitschko will make his 16th title defense when he faces Alex Leapai, one of his mandatory challengers, on 26 April in at the König-Pilsener-Arena in Oberhausen, Germany, as K2 Promotions announced Monday. The Klitschko and Leapai camps had agreed to a deal several weeks ago, which allowed them to avoid a purse bid, but it has now been signed. Leapai (30–4–3, 24 KOs), 34, a native of Samoa living in Australia, came out of nowhere to be appointed as the mandatory challenger by the WBO after scoring a major upset."

=== Leapai vs. Wladimir Klitschko ===
Despite the fact that Klitschko possessed an overwhelming advantage over his challenger, the Ukrainian was quoted as saying the bout was "the most important fight of my career" due to the political backdrop of the encounter from a Ukrainian point of view. Early in 2014 Russia annexed Crimea from Ukraine and consequently, both nations were mobilising for the possibility of war in the short term. Wladimir's brother Vitali Klitschko was preparing to run for the Ukrainian presidency in looming May elections and the 37-year-old title holder admitted boxing was second in his mind to the political upheaval in his homeland. Vitali would be elected Mayor of Kyiv in 2014. Klitschko claimed the spectacle of the fight would be ever important to "boost the morale" of his countrymen.

Former world heavyweight champion Shannon Briggs interrupted a pre-fight press conference in Germany just days before the anticipated bout. Briggs challenged Klitschko for a fight and accused Leapai of being an unworthy opponent for Klitschko.

Leapai was knocked out by Klitschko in the fifth round of a fight scheduled for 12 rounds. Leapai was knocked down barely more than a minute into the bout. Klitschko retained his IBF, WBA, WBO and IBO championship belts and used his height and reach advantage to control the fight with Leapai. Leapai reportedly rattled his opponent once in the fight before Klitschko responded with a flurry of blows that eventually dropped the Australian to the canvas.

=== Career after world title shot ===
In his next fight, Leapai fought Malik Scott. Leapai lost the fight via unanimous decision, losing 100–90, 99–91 and 98–92 on the scorecards.

On two weeks notice, Alex Leapai took a fight against former WBO champion Joseph Parker after his deal with Eric Molina fell through during the signing stages. Leapai went on to lose after a tenth-round stoppage. Despite protests from Leapai, the referee Ricky Gonzalez stopped the fight after Parker landed seven straight punches to the head of his opponent.

== Personal life ==
Leapai is married to his high school sweetheart, Theresa, and has six children. Four daughters (Cyanne, Maria, Menime and Ivona) and two sons (Alex and EJ).

In 2005, Leapai spent six months in Queensland's Woodford Correctional Centre on a grievous bodily harm charge after attacking two bouncers.

An avid rugby league fan, Leapai supports the Brisbane Broncos. Leapai's inspiration is fellow Samoan heavyweight boxer David Tua.

== Professional boxing record ==
43 fights	31 wins	8 losses
By knockout	25	4
By decision	6	4
Draws	4	

No.	Result	Record	Opponent	Type	Round, time	Date	Location	Notes
44	Loss	31–8–4	Joseph Parker	TKO	10 (12), 2:18	29 Jun 2019	Dunkin' Donuts Center, Providence, Rhode Island, US	
42	Draw	31–7–4	Roger Izonritei	TD	3 (8), 2:26	13 Dec 2017	Convention & Exhibition Centre, Brisbane, Australia	
41	Win	31–7–3	Thomas Peato	TKO	3 (8), 2:26	14 Oct 2017	Convention & Exhibition Centre, Brisbane, Australia	
40	Loss	30–7–3	Mahmoud Charr	UD	10	22 May 2015	Olympic Indoor Arena, Moscow, Russia	
39	Loss	30–6–3	Malik Scott	UD	10	31 Oct 2014	Logan Metro Sports Centre, Logan City, Australia	
38	Loss	30–5–3	Wladimir Klitschko	TKO	5 (12), 2:05	26 Apr 2014	König Pilsener Arena, Oberhausen, Germany	For WBA (Super), IBF, WBO, IBO, and The Ring heavyweight titles
37	Win	30–4–3	Denis Boytsov	UD	10	23 Nov 2013	Stechert Arena, Bamberg, Germany	Retained WBO Asia Pacific heavyweight title
36	Win	29–4–3	Felipe Romero	TKO	9 (12), 1:15	9 Aug 2013	Hengyang, China	Retained WBO Asia Pacific heavyweight title
35	Win	28–4–3	Joe Lloyd	KO	1 (8), 1:18	9 May 2013	Royal International Convention Centre, Brisbane, Australia	
34	Win	27–4–3	Matt Hicks	TKO	1 (8), 2:42	8 Feb 2013	Brisbane Entertainment Centre, Brisbane, Australia	
33	Win	26–4–3	Akmal Aslanov	TKO	5 (12), 1:27	21 Dec 2012	Zhuzhou Stadium, Zhuzhou, China	Won vacant WBO Asia Pacific and WBO Oriental heavyweight titles
32	Loss	25–4–3	Kevin Johnson	TKO	9 (12), 2:22	1 Apr 2012	Doomben Racecourse, Brisbane, Australia	Lost IBF Australasian heavyweight title
31	Win	25–3–3	Troy Weida	TKO	1 (10), 1:56	8 Dec 2011	The Arena, Brisbane, Australia	
30	Win	24–3–3	Evgeny Orlov	KO	4 (8), 1:37	21 Oct 2011	Broncos Leagues Club, Brisbane, Australia	
29	Win	23–3–3	Okello Peter	KO	3 (12)	17 Apr 2011	Jakarta International Expo, Jakarta, Indonesia	Won vacant IBF Australasian heavyweight title
28	Win	22–3–3	Jason Barnett	KO	1 (8), 2:47	29 Jan 2011	Gold Coast Convention Centre, Gold Coast, Australia	
27	Win	21–3–3	Darnell Wilson	UD	8	4 Dec 2010	Gold Coast Convention Centre, Gold Coast, Australia	
26	Win	20–3–3	Owen Beck	TKO	6 (10), 2:50	12 Aug 2010	Southport RSL Club, Gold Coast, Australia	
25	Win	19–3–3	Travis Walker	TKO	4 (10), 2:52	30 Jun 2010	Brisbane Entertainment Centre, Brisbane, Australia	
24	Win	18–3–3	Bob Mirovic	KO	1 (10), 2:57	29 Apr 2010	Gold Coast Convention Centre, Gold Coast, Australia	
23	Win	17–3–3	Hiriwa Te Rangi	TKO	1 (6), 1:11	4 Sep 2009	Coolangatta & Tweed Heads Golf Club, Tweed Heads, Australia	
22	Draw	16–3–3	Kotatsu Takehara	MD	6	31 Jul 2009	Hilton Hotel, Brisbane, Australia	
21	Win	16–3–2	Colin Wilson	KO	8 (12), 2:11	19 Jun 2009	Southport RSL Club, Gold Coast, Australia	Won vacant WBO Oriental interim heavyweight title
20	Win	15–3–2	Oscar Talemaira	KO	1 (4), 0:56	27 May 2009	Brisbane Entertainment Centre, Brisbane, Australia	
19	Win	14–3–2	Oscar Talemaira	KO	2 (6), 2:49	20 Feb 2009	Southport RSL Club, Gold Coast, Australia	
18	Win	13–3–2	Pieter Cronje	UD	10	14 Nov 2008	Gold Coast Convention Centre, Gold Coast, Australia	Won vacant WBF Australasian heavyweight title
17	Win	12–3–2	Alipate Liava	KO	5 (6)	27 Sep 2008	Town Hall, Christchurch, New Zealand	
16	Win	11–3–2	Moyoyo Mensah	UD	8	5 Sep 2008	Mansfield Tavern, Brisbane, Australia	
15	Win	10–3–2	Mohamed Azzaoui	KO	2 (8), 1:11	1 Aug 2008	Convention & Exhibition Centre, Brisbane, Australia	
14	Loss	9–3–2	Colin Wilson	SD	12	27 Jun 2008	Mansfield Tavern, Brisbane, Australia	Lost OPBF heavyweight title
13	Win	9–2–2	Michael Kirby	UD	12	14 Mar 2008	Kedron Wavell Services Club, Brisbane, Australia	Retained OPBF heavyweight title
12	Win	8–2–2	Nathan Briggs	KO	8 (12), 2:09	30 Nov 2007	Kedron Wavell Services Club, Brisbane, Australia	Won vacant OPBF heavyweight title
11	Win	7–2–2	Ofa Pi Bouvalu Uluakiahoeia	RTD	2 (4), 3:00	7 Sep 2007	Broncos Leagues Club, Brisbane, Australia	
10	Win	6–2–2	Jason Reti	TKO	2 (6), 2:13	29 Jun 2007	Convention & Exhibition Centre, Brisbane, Australia	
9	Win	5–2–2	Oscar Talemaira	KO	5 (6), 1:46	23 Feb 2007	Southport RSL Club, Gold Coast, Australia	
8	Win	4–2–2	John Szigeti	TKO	1 (6), 1:46	17 Nov 2006	Magic Millions Complex, Gold Coast, Australia	
7	Win	3–2–2	Hiriwa Te Rangi	TKO	4 (4), 2:46	10 Nov 2006	Logan Diggers Club, Logan City, Australia	
6	Loss	2–2–2	Baden Oui	TKO	4 (4), 0:51	19 Aug 2005	Convention & Exhibition Centre, Brisbane, Australia	
5	Win	2–1–2	Vai Toevai	UD	4	5 Aug 2005	Mansfield Tavern, Brisbane, Australia	
4	Draw	1–1–2	Nermin Sabanovic	PTS	6	20 May 2005	Broncos Leagues Club, Brisbane, Australia	
3	Loss	1–1–1	Yan Kulkov	UD	8	3 Dec 2004	Mansfield Tavern, Brisbane, Australia	
2	Win	1–0–1	Danny Morgan	TKO	8 (8), 2:42	17 Sep 2004	Mansfield Tavern, Brisbane, Australia	
1	Draw	0–0–1	Mark de Mori	MD	6	30 Jul 2004	Broncos Leagues Club, Brisbane, Australia	

== Minor titles won ==
- WBO Asia Pacific heavyweight title
- WBO Oriental heavyweight title
- IBF Australasian heavyweight title
- OPBF heavyweight title
