= Boxing at the 1998 Asian Games – Men's 91 kg =

Boxing competitions

Men's 91 kg at the 1998 Asian Games
- Venue: Land Sports Complex
- Date: 12–17 December 1998
- Competitors: 8 from 8 nations

Medalists
| gold medal | Ruslan Chagaev | Uzbekistan |
| silver medal | Muzaffar Iqbal Mirza | Pakistan |
| bronze medal | Mohammad Abukhadijeh | Jordan |
| bronze medal | Rouhollah Hosseini | Iran |

The men's heavyweight boxing competition at the 1998 Asian Games in Bangkok, Thailand was held from 12 to 17 December at the Land Sports Complex.

Like all Asian Games boxing events, the competition was a straight single-elimination tournament. This event consisted of 8 boxers. The competition began with the quarterfinal round on 12 December, where the number of competitors was reduced to 4, and concluded with the final on 17 December. Both semi-final losers were awarded bronze medals.

All bouts consisted of five three-minute rounds. The boxers receive points for every successful punch they land on their opponent's head or upper body. The boxer with the most points at the end of the bouts wins. If a boxer is knocked to the ground and cannot get up before the referee counts to 10 then the bout is over and the opponent wins.

== Schedule ==
All times are Indochina Time (UTC+07:00)

| Date | Time | Event |
|---|---|---|
| Saturday, 12 December 1998 | 14:00 | Quarterfinals |
| Monday, 14 December 1998 | 14:00 | Semifinals |
| Thursday, 17 December 1998 | 14:00 | Final |

== Results ==
Legend

- DSQ — Won by disqualification
- RSCH — Won by referee stop contest head blow

Quarterfinals
Muzaffar Iqbal Mirza (PAK) | 17
Kanybek Ajybaev (KGZ) | 10
Osama Abdalaal (PLE)
Mohammad Abukhadijeh (JOR) | DSQ
Rouhollah Hosseini (IRI) | 20
Ma Jingwei (CHN) | 12
Ruslan Chagaev (UZB) | RSCH
Chitra Bahadur Gurung (NEP)

Semifinals
Muzaffar Iqbal Mirza (PAK) | 23
Mohammad Abukhadijeh (JOR) | 8
Rouhollah Hosseini (IRI) | 2
Ruslan Chagaev (UZB) | 17

Final
Muzaffar Iqbal Mirza (PAK)
Ruslan Chagaev (UZB) | RSCH
