= Bob Mirovic =

Australian boxer

Personal information
- Nickname: The Big Bear
- Nationality: Australian
- Born: Bob Mirovic; 25 February 1966 (age 60) Croatia
- Height: 1.96 m (6 ft 5 in)
- Weight: Heavyweight

Boxing career
- Reach: 203 cm (80 in)
- Stance: Orthodox

Boxing record
- Total fights: 55
- Wins: 31
- Win by KO: 21
- Losses: 23
- Draws: 1

Bob "The Big Bear" Mirovic (born 25 February 1966) is an Australian boxer of Croatian descent. Standing at 1.96 m (6 ft 5 in) and with a reach of 203 cm (80 inches), he started boxing at the age of 22 in 1987. He has fought a number of famous fighters, including Nikolai Valuev, Joe Bugner and Frans Botha. He has also been a sparring partner of Mike Tyson.

He currently resides in Berkeley Vale, New South Wales.

== Professional boxing record ==
31 Wins (21 knockouts, 10 decisions), 23 Losses (10 knockouts, 13 decisions), 1 Draws
Result	Record	Opponent	Type	Round	Date	Location	Notes
Win	31-23-1	(Tonga) Alipate Liava'a	UD	6	4 February 2011	, Punchbowl, Australia	
Win	30-23-1	(New Zealand) Bob Gasio	TKO	2	19 November 2010	Revesby Workers Club, Revesby, Australia	Referee stopped the bout at 2:59 of the second round.
Loss	29-23-1	(Australia) Alex Leapai	KO	1	29 April 2010	Gold Coast Convention and Exhibition Centre, Broadbeach, Australia	Mirovic knocked out at 2:57 of the first round.
Loss	29-22-1	(Australia) John Hopoate	UD	10	23 July 2009	AIS Arena, Bruce, Australia	Australia Heavyweight Title.
Loss	29-21-1	(Australia) John Hopoate	TKO	9	10 September 2008	Gold Coast Convention and Exhibition Centre, Broadbeach, Australia	Australia Heavyweight Title. Referee stopped the bout at 2:53 of the ninth round.
Win	29-20-1	(Australia) Colin Wilson	KO	8	2 November 2007	Fankhauser Reserve, Southport, Australia	Australia Heavyweight Title. Wilson knocked out at 2:24 of the eighth round.
Loss	28-20-1	(South Africa) Frans Botha	UD	12	6 July 2007	(South Africa) The Carousel Casino and Entertainment World, Temba, Australia	World Boxing Foundation (WBFo) World Heavyweight Title.
Loss	28-19-1	(New Zealand) Shane Cameron	KO	8	7 March 2007	Sydney Entertainment Centre, Sydney, Australia	WBA Pan African Heavyweight Title. Mirovic knocked out at 2:50 of the eighth round.
Loss	28-18-1	(Turkey) Sinan Samil Sam	UD	12	10 November 2006	Alsterdorfer Sporthalle, Alsterdorf, Germany	WBC International Heavyweight Title.
Win	28-17-1	(Fiji) Fatu Tuimanono	KO	1	20 September 2006	Challenge Stadium, Perth, Australia	Tuimanono knocked out at 2:14 of the first round.
Win	27-17-1	(New Zealand) Richard Tutaki	TKO	2	21 July 2006	WIN Entertainment Centre, Wollongong, Australia	WBFo International Heavyweight Title. Referee stopped the bout at 2:33 of the second round.
Loss	26-17-1	(Uganda) Okello Peter	UD	12	15 April 2006	Korakuen Hall, Tokyo, Japan	OPBF Heavyweight Title.
Win	26-16-1	(New Zealand) Richard Tutaki	KO	2	9 December 2005	Blacktown International Sportspark, Blacktown, Australia	WBFo International Heavyweight Title. Tutaki knocked out at 1:35 of the second round.
Loss	25-16-1	(United States) Rob Calloway	UD	12	24 June 2005	Royal Pines Resort, Ashmore, Australia	WBFo World/PABA Heavyweight Titles.
Loss	25-15-1	(Germany) Timo Hoffmann	UD	12	12 March 2005	Zwickau, Germany	IBF Intercontinental Heavyweight Title.
Win	25-14-1	(Australia) Colin Wilson	UD	10	17 December 2004	Royal Pines Resort, Ashmore, Australia	
Win	24-14-1	(New Zealand) Hiriwa Te Rangi	KO	4	4 December 2004	SKYCITY, Auckland, New Zealand	Te Rangi knocked out at 1:27 of the fourth round.
Loss	23-14-1	(United Kingdom) Matt Skelton	RTD	4	5 June 2004	(United Kingdom) York Hall, London, England	Commonwealth Heavyweight Title. Mirovic did not come out for the fifth round.
Win	23-13-1	(Fiji) Mosese Kavika	TKO	1	7 May 2004	s, Newcastle, Australia	WBFo International Heavyweight Title.
Win	22-13-1	(Australia) Paul Robinson	TKO	4	16 April 2004	Dandenong Basketball Stadium, Dandenong, Australia	
Win	21-13-1	(Fiji) Silovate Rasaku Junior	KO	3	21 March 2004	Challenge Stadium, Perth, Australia	
Loss	20-13-1	(Russia) Nikolay Valuev	UD	8	16 August 2003	Nürburgring, Nürburg, Germany	
Win	20-12-1	(Australia) Danny Buzza	KO	4	11 July 2003	Carrington Street Oval, Gosford, Australia	
Win	19-12-1	(Papua New Guinea) Mitch O'Hello	KO	3	27 June 2003	Metro City Nightclub, Northbridge, Australia	WBFo International Heavyweight Title.
Loss	18-12-1	(United Kingdom) Danny Williams	TKO	4	26 April 2003	(United Kingdom) , London, England	Commonwealth Heavyweight Title. Referee stopped the bout at 2:33 of the fourth round.
Win	18-11-1	(Australia) Auckland Auimatagi	TKO	5	7 March 2003	Carrington Street Oval, Gosford, Australia	Australia Heavyweight Title.
Win	17-11-1	(Australia) Phil Gregory	TKO	3	7 February 2003	Fankhauser Reserve, Southport, Australia	Australia Heavyweight Title.
Win	16-11-1	(Australia) Auckland Auimatagi	TKO	3	15 November 2002	s, Newcastle, Australia	Australia Heavyweight Title.
Win	15-11-1	(Australia) Roger Izonritei	KO	5	18 September 2002	Hordern Pavilion, Sydney, Australia	Australia Heavyweight Title.
Win	14-11-1	(Australia) Colin Wilson	SD	12	10 May 2002	Carrington Street Oval, Gosford, Australia	Australia Heavyweight Title.
Loss	13-11-1	(Uganda) Okello Peter	KO	5	1 December 2001	City Gymnasium, Tōkai, Japan	OPBF Heavyweight Title. Mirovic knocked out at 2:03 of the fifth round.
Win	13-10-1	(Australia) Nathan Briggs	KO	6	8 July 2001	Jupiters Hotel and Casino, Broadbeach, Australia	Australia Heavyweight Title.
Win	12-10-1	(New Zealand) Peau Lemauga	KO	3	29 September 2000	Noumea Basketball Stadium, Noumea, New Caledonia	
Win	11-10-1	(New Zealand) Clay Auimatagi	PTS	4	25 August 2000	Bankstown PCYC, Sydney, Australia	
Loss	10-10-1	(Fiji) Aisea Nama	TKO	4	28 July 1999	Croatian Culture Centre, Henderson, New Zealand	
Loss	10-9-1	(Australia) Kali Meehan	KO	4	25 June 1999	Wyong Stadium, Wyong, Australia	Australia Heavyweight Title.
Win	10-8-1	(Australia) John Wyborn	PTS	10	30 April 1999	Wyong Stadium, Wyong, Australia	
Win	9-8-1	(Australia) Danny Buzza	MD	12	15 March 1999	Star City Casino, Sydney, Australia	Australia Heavyweight Title.
Win	8-8-1	(Australia) Colin Wilson	PTS	12	5 September 1998	, Nerang, Australia	Australia Heavyweight Title.
Loss	7-8-1	(Australia) Joe Bugner	SD	12	20 April 1998	s, Carrara, Australia	Australia/PABA Heavyweight Titles.
Loss	7-7-1	(Australia) Justin Fortune	TKO	6	6 December 1997	Stockland Stadium, Townsville, Australia	PABA Heavyweight Title.
Loss	7-6-1	(Australia) James Grima	PTS	12	20 April 1997	Billboard Nite Club, Melbourne, Australia	OPBF Heavyweight Title.
Win	7-5-1	(Australia) James Ali	KO	4	26 January 1997	Broadmeadows, Australia	
Loss	6-5-1	(Australia) James Grima	MD	12	30 October 1995	Carrington Street Oval, Gosford, Australia	OPBF Heavyweight Title.
Win	6-4-1	(Australia) Colin Wilson	TKO	8	19 May 1995	Henson Park, Sydney, Australia	Referee stopped the bout at 2:30 of the eighth round.
Loss	5-4-1	(New Zealand) August Tanuvasa	SD	8	7 April 1995	Doyalson Stadium, Doyalson, Australia	
Win	5-3-1	(Australia) Matthew K. Reid	PTS	10	20 January 1995	Doyalson Stadium, Doyalson, Australia	Australia-New South Wales Heavyweight Title.
Win	4-3-1	(Australia) Matthew K. Reid	TKO	4	29 October 1994	St Marys Band Club, Sydney, Australia	
Loss	3-3-1	(Australia) James Grima	TKO	2	1 May 1993	Henson Park, Sydney, Australia	
Draw	3-2-1	(Australia) Steve Unterholzer	PTS	8	26 December 1992	Ettalong, Australia	
Win	3-2	(Fiji) Niko Degai	SD	6	28 March 1990	Parramatta Stadium, Sydney, Australia	
Win	2-2	(Australia) Mark Moran	SD	4	29 July 1988	Groundz Precinct, Dapto, Australia	
Loss	1-2	(Australia) Arzan Basic	PTS	4	16 October 1987	Hordern Pavilion, Sydney, Australia	
Loss	1-1	(Australia) Arzan Basic	PTS	6	7 August 1987	Blacktown Stadium, Sydney, Australia	
Win	1-0	(Australia) Sam Kurukitoga	TKO	3	15 May 1987	Cronulla Workingmen's Club, Sydney, Australia	
