= 1999 Asian Amateur Boxing Championships =

Boxing competitions

1999 Asian Boxing Championships
- Host city: Tashkent, Uzbekistan
- Dates: 23–30 October 1999

The 20th edition of the Men's Asian Amateur Boxing Championships were held from October 23 to October 30, 1999, in Tashkent, Uzbekistan.

== Medal summary ==
| Event | Gold | Silver | Bronze |
|---|---|---|---|
| Light flyweight 48 kg | Dilshod Yuldashev; Uzbekistan | Suban Pannon; Thailand | Yang Xiangzhong; China |
| Light flyweight 48 kg | Dilshod Yuldashev; Uzbekistan | Suban Pannon; Thailand | Danilo Lerio; Philippines |
| Flyweight; 51 kg | Kim Tae-kyu; South Korea | Arlan Lerio; Philippines | Mohammad Rahim Rahimi; Iran |
| Flyweight; 51 kg | Kim Tae-kyu; South Korea | Arlan Lerio; Philippines | Bulat Zhumadilov; Kazakhstan |
| Bantamweight; 54 kg | Alisher Rahimov; Uzbekistan | Taalaibek Kadiraliev; Kyrgyzstan | Serik Zheylelov; Kazakhstan |
| Bantamweight; 54 kg | Alisher Rahimov; Uzbekistan | Taalaibek Kadiraliev; Kyrgyzstan | Sontaya Wongprates; Thailand |
| Featherweight; 57 kg | Tulkunbay Turgunov; Uzbekistan | Bekzat Sattarkhanov; Kazakhstan | Muzaffar Yusupbekov; Kyrgyzstan |
| Featherweight; 57 kg | Tulkunbay Turgunov; Uzbekistan | Bekzat Sattarkhanov; Kazakhstan | Suttisak Samaksaman; Thailand |
| Lightweight; 60 kg | Nurzhan Karimzhanov; Kazakhstan | Larry Semillano; Philippines | Narendra Rana; India |
| Lightweight; 60 kg | Nurzhan Karimzhanov; Kazakhstan | Larry Semillano; Philippines | Jurabek Nabiev; Uzbekistan |
| Light welterweight 63.5 kg | Muhammad Abdullaev; Uzbekistan | Hwang Sung-bum; South Korea | Batyrkhan Zhaksybayev; Kazakhstan |
| Light welterweight 63.5 kg | Muhammad Abdullaev; Uzbekistan | Hwang Sung-bum; South Korea | Jakkrit Suwannalird; Thailand |
| Welterweight; 67 kg | Parkpoom Jangphonak; Thailand | Daniyar Munaytbasov; Kazakhstan | Esfandiar Mohammadi; Iran |
| Welterweight; 67 kg | Parkpoom Jangphonak; Thailand | Daniyar Munaytbasov; Kazakhstan | Sirojiddin Naimov; Uzbekistan |
| Light middleweight 71 kg | Yermakhan Ibraimov; Kazakhstan | Nurbek Kasenov; Kyrgyzstan | Batmönkhiin Enkhbayar; Mongolia |
| Light middleweight 71 kg | Yermakhan Ibraimov; Kazakhstan | Nurbek Kasenov; Kyrgyzstan | Homayoun Amiri; Iran |
| Middleweight; 75 kg | Abudoureheman; China | Vladislav Vizilter; Kyrgyzstan | Vyacheslav Burba; Kazakhstan |
| Middleweight; 75 kg | Abudoureheman; China | Vladislav Vizilter; Kyrgyzstan | Kim Ho-chul; South Korea |
| Light heavyweight 81 kg | Sergey Mihaylov; Uzbekistan | Olzhas Orazaliyev; Kazakhstan | Jamal Sanati; Iran |
| Light heavyweight 81 kg | Sergey Mihaylov; Uzbekistan | Olzhas Orazaliyev; Kazakhstan | Zhao Yong; China |
| Heavyweight; 91 kg | Ruslan Chagaev; Uzbekistan | Talgat Dossanov; Kazakhstan | Adnan Ali; Kuwait |
| Heavyweight; 91 kg | Ruslan Chagaev; Uzbekistan | Talgat Dossanov; Kazakhstan | Rouhollah Hosseini; Iran |
| Super heavyweight +91 kg | Rustam Saidov; Uzbekistan | Mukhtarkhan Dildabekov; Kazakhstan | Aleksandr Polmiluyko; Kyrgyzstan |
| Super heavyweight +91 kg | Rustam Saidov; Uzbekistan | Mukhtarkhan Dildabekov; Kazakhstan | Ali Mansour; Lebanon |

== Medal table ==
| Rank | Nation | Gold | Silver | Bronze | Total |
|---|---|---|---|---|---|
| 1 | Uzbekistan | 7 | 0 | 2 | 9 |
| 2 | Kazakhstan | 2 | 5 | 4 | 11 |
| 3 | Thailand | 1 | 1 | 3 | 5 |
| 4 | South Korea | 1 | 1 | 1 | 3 |
| 5 | China | 1 | 0 | 2 | 3 |
| 6 | Kyrgyzstan | 0 | 3 | 2 | 5 |
| 7 | Philippines | 0 | 2 | 1 | 3 |
| 8 | Iran | 0 | 0 | 5 | 5 |
| 9 | India | 0 | 0 | 1 | 1 |
| 9 | Kuwait | 0 | 0 | 1 | 1 |
| 9 | Lebanon | 0 | 0 | 1 | 1 |
| 9 | Mongolia | 0 | 0 | 1 | 1 |
| Totals (12 entries) | | 12 | 12 | 24 | 48 |
