= Toakipa Tasefa =

New Zealand boxer

- Born: Toakipa Tasefa; 19 January 1972 (age 54); Niue
- Other names: Kipa
- Nationality: Niuean; New Zealander
- Height: 188 cm (6 ft 2 in)
- Weight: 223 lb (101 kg; 15 st 13 lb)
- Division: Heavyweight
- Reach: 77 in (196 cm)
- Style: Boxing
- Trainer: Francisco Martinez
- Years active: 1993-2001

Professional boxing record
- Total: 32
- Wins: 27
- By knockout: 22
- Losses: 3
- By knockout: 1
- Draws: 2
- No contests: 0

Other information
- Occupation: Boxer
- Boxing record from BoxRec
- Last updated on: 6 February 2017

Toakipa Tasefa (born 19 January 1972, Niue) is a Niuean retired professional boxer who competed from 1993 to 2001.

Tasefa Has fought in multiple countries in his career including New Zealand, USA, Australia, Japan, French Polynesia and Russia. Tasefa was managed by Mike Edwards.

== Professional boxing titles ==
- New Zealand Boxing Association
  - New Zealand national heavyweight title
- World Boxing Council
  - Oriental and Pacific Boxing Federation heavyweight title (210Ibs)
- Oceanic Boxing Association
  - OBA heavyweight title

== Professional boxing record ==
32 fights	27 wins	3 losses
By knockout	22	1
By decision	5	2
Draws	2	

No.	Result	Record	Opponent	Type	Round, time	Date	Location	Notes
32	Loss	27–3–2	(Russia) Nikolay Valuev	UD	12	28 Sep 2001	Yubileiny Sports Palace, Saint Petersburg, Russia	For WBA-PABA heavyweight title
31	Win	27–2–2	(Fiji) Mosese Kavika	TKO	7 (12)	16 Mar 2001	Papeete, French Polynesia	Won vacant OBA heavyweight title
30	Win	26–2–2	(Samoa) Emilio Leti	TKO	8 (10)	5 Sep 1999	Sheraton Hotel, Auckland, New Zealand	
29	Win	25–2–2	(Uganda) Okello Peter	UD	12	10 Apr 1999	Okayama City, Okayama, Japan	Retained WBC-OPBF heavyweight title
28	Win	24–2–2	(Fiji) Waisiki Ligaloa	TKO	6 (6)	28 Mar 1999	Mandalay Ballroom, Auckland, New Zealand	
27	Win	23–2–2	(New Zealand) Taule Mailisi	KO	4 (6)	6 Feb 1999	Downtown Convention Centre, Auckland, New Zealand	
26	Win	22–2–2	(Australia) Justin Fortune	TKO	2 (12)	31 Oct 1998	Nagoya, Aichi, Japan	Won vacant WBC-OPBF heavyweight title
25	Loss	21–2–2	(Kazakhstan) Oleg Maskaev	KO	1 (12); 1:15	2 Oct 1998	(United States) Civic Center, Lake Charles, Louisiana, USA	For vacant WBA-PABA heavyweight title
24	Win	21–1–2	(New Zealand) Josh Fuimaono	KO	1 (6)	19 Jul 1998	Downtown Convention Centre, Auckland, New Zealand	
23	Win	20–1–2	(New Zealand) Taule Mailisi	PTS	6	2 Apr 1998	Downtown Convention Centre, Auckland, New Zealand	
22	Win	19–1–2	(New Zealand) Lindsay Christiansen	TKO	12 (12)	19 Feb 1998	Powerstation Nightclub, Auckland, New Zealand	Won vacant NZBA heavyweight title
21	Win	18–1–2	(Australia) Matthew Reid	KO	3 (10)	16 Nov 1997	Downtown Convention Centre, Auckland, New Zealand	
20	Win	17–1–2	(Fiji) Manao Navuilawa	KO	2 (8)	13 Jun 1997	Addison Road Community Centre, Sydney, New South Wales, Australia	
19	Win	16–1–2	(Fiji) Solomone Raqili	TKO	3 (6)	1 May 1997	Downtown Convention Centre, Auckland, New Zealand	
18	Win	15–1–2	(Fiji) Waisiki Ligaloa	KO	6 (10)	4 Apr 1997	Beaton Park Stadium, Wollongong, New South Wales, Australia	
17	Win	14–1–2	(Fiji) Manao Navuilawa	KO	4 (10)	8 Dec 1996	Downtown Convention Centre, Auckland, New Zealand	
16	Win	13–1–2	(Fiji) Aisea Nama	KO	4 (10)	6 Jun 1996	ABA Stadium, Kohimarama, New Zealand	
15	Win	12–1–2	(New Zealand) August Tanuvasa	PTS	8	21 Mar 1996	ABA Stadium, Kohimarama, New Zealand	
14	Win	11–1–2	(Samoa) Raeli Raeli	KO	2 (10)	25 Jan 1996	Downtown Convention Centre, Auckland, New Zealand	
13	Win	10–1–2	(Colombia) Victor Alarcon	KO	4 (6)	2 Dec 1995	(United States) Jai Alai Fronton, Miami, Florida, USA	
12	Win	9–1–2	(United States) Moises Membreno	TKO	3 (6)	26 Aug 1995	(United States) Miami, Florida, USA	
11	Win	8–1–2	(United States) Willie Driver	TKO	3 (6)	12 Aug 1995	(United States) Miami, Florida, USA	
10	Draw	7–1–2	(Puerto Rico) Miguel Otero	PTS	4	20 May 1995	(United States) Miami, Florida, USA	
9	Win	7–1–1	(Puerto Rico) Miguel Otero	PTS	4	15 Apr 1995	(United States) Jai Alai Fronton, Miami, Florida, USA	
8	Win	6–1–1	(United States) Ed Mosley	TKO	3 (4)	18 Mar 1995	(United States) Miami, Florida, USA	
7	Win	5–1–1	(United States) Isaac Poole	KO	2 (6)	11 Feb 1995	(United States) Jai Alai Fronton, Miami, Florida, USA	
6	Draw	4–1–1	(Puerto Rico) Miguel Otero	TKO	4	28 Jan 1995	(United States) Miami, Florida, USA	
5	Win	4–1	(Puerto Rico) Miguel Otero	TKO	3 (4)	10 Dec 1994	(United States) Miami, Florida, USA	
4	Loss	3–1	(United States) Larry Carlisle	UD	6	10 Sep 1994	(United States) Jai Alai Fronton, Miami, Florida, USA	
3	Win	3–0	(Colombia) Victor Alarcon	TKO	3 (6)	13 Aug 1994	(United States) Jai Alai Fronton, Miami, Florida, USA	
2	Win	2–0	(United States) Juan Guerra	KO	2 (6)	14 May 1994	(United States) Jai Alai Fronton, Miami, Florida, USA	
1	Win	1–0	(New Zealand) Rocky Salanoa	PTS	6	11 Dec 1993	Lumpinee Stadium, Otahuhu, New Zealand	
