= Abudureheman Abulikemu =

Chinese boxer (1978–2015)

Personal information
- Native name: ئابدۇراخمان ئابلىكىم 阿布都热合曼·阿不力克木
- Nationality: Chinese
- Born: 1 June 1978 Altay City, China
- Died: 21 January 2015 (aged 36) Urumqi, China
- Height: 1.82 m (6 ft 0 in)
- Weight: 75 kg (165 lb)
- Spouse: Ayinu'er Baihetiya'er

Sport
- Sport: Boxing

Abudureheman Abulikemu

Chinese name
- Simplified Chinese: 阿布都热合曼·阿不力克木
Transcriptions
Standard Mandarin
- Hanyu Pinyin: Ābùdūrèhémàn Ābùlìkèmù

Alternative Chinese name
- Simplified Chinese: 阿不都热合曼·阿不力克木
Transcriptions
Standard Mandarin
- Hanyu Pinyin: Ābùdūrèhémàn Ābùlìkèmù

Uyghur name
- Uyghur: ئابدۇراخمان ئابلىكىم
Transcriptions
- Latin Yëziqi: Abduraxman Ablikim
- Siril Yëziqi: Абдурахман Абликим

Abudureheman Abulikemu (1 July 1978 – 21 January 2015), also transliterated Abudoureheman and Abuduyeheman, was a Chinese boxer. He won a gold medal in the 1999 Asian Amateur Boxing Championships and competed in the 2000 Summer Olympics. He was the first boxer from Xinjiang to compete in the Olympics.

The year after the Olympics, he won a gold medal at the 2001 National Games of China, and he also competed at the 2005 and 2009 National Games. At the 2009 Games, an elbow injury cut his career as a boxer short, but he remained active in the boxing community as a coach.

== Life and career ==
Abudureheman was born in 1978 in Altay City, Xinjiang to a mining family. His father was named Abulike Musa (阿不力克·穆萨). As a child he enjoyed soccer, but after the Xinjiang boxing team was formed in 1994, his coach encouraged him to try boxing. He was a natural, and after only a few months of training he won the Altay boxing championship. His talent caught the attention of the Xinjiang boxing team coach, Abulikemu Abudurexiti, and he joined the team. In December of that year he won the Xinjiang boxing championship. The next year he represented Xinjiang at the national championship, where he won third place in the 71-kg weight class.

In 1998, Abudureheman switched to the 75-kg weight class and gained nationwide fame when he won the national elite boxing championship.

At the 1999 Asian Amateur Boxing Championships in Tashkent, he won a gold medal in the 75-kg weight class. He was the first boxer from Xinjiang ever to win a gold medal at the Asian Amateur Boxing Championships, and the only Chinese boxer to win a gold medal that year.

As a result of his win in 1999, he qualified in boxing at the 2000 Summer Olympics, but did not win a medal. This made him the first boxer from Xinjiang to compete in the Olympics. He wanted to compete in the 2004 Summer Olympics, but a spinal disc herniation prevented him from participating in the qualifiers. He later said in an interview that missing the 2004 Olympics was his life's greatest regret. When the 2008 Summer Olympics were held in Beijing, he participated in that year's Olympic torch relay. The same year, he competed in a USA Boxing event with other Olympic boxers in Bridgeport, Connecticut.

He competed in the 2001 National Games of China, where he won a gold medal. He also competed in the 2005 National Games; by that time he had gained weight and competed in the 81-kg weight class. By the 2009 National Games, he was in the 91-kg weight class. He competed as part of the Sichuan team at the 2009 Games, but he injured his elbow and had seven bone fragments removed from his elbow joint, forcing him to withdraw from the 23 October quarter finals. This injury marked the end of his career as a boxer, but he became a boxing coach for the Xinjiang team.

Abudureheman's friends described him as diligent in his training and passionate about boxing.

== Recognition ==
In 2000 Abudureheman was named an "autonomous region exceptional worker", and in 2001 he was named one of ten outstanding young people in Xinjiang.

== Personal life ==
Abudureheman was married to Ayinu'er Baihetiya'er (阿依努尔·拜合提亚尔). They had two children.

== Death ==
Abudureheman died suddenly at his home in Urumqi on 21 January 2015. Upon hearing the news, boxing coaches in China expressed their shock and sadness at his untimely death. The day after Abudureheman's death, Shang Hongbo (商红波), director of the Xinjiang Boxing Center, described his death as a loss not only for the Xinjiang boxing team, but for the Chinese boxing world as a whole.
