= Woodford Correctional Centre =

Prison in Queensland, Australia

Coordinates: 26°56′53″S 152°45′01″E

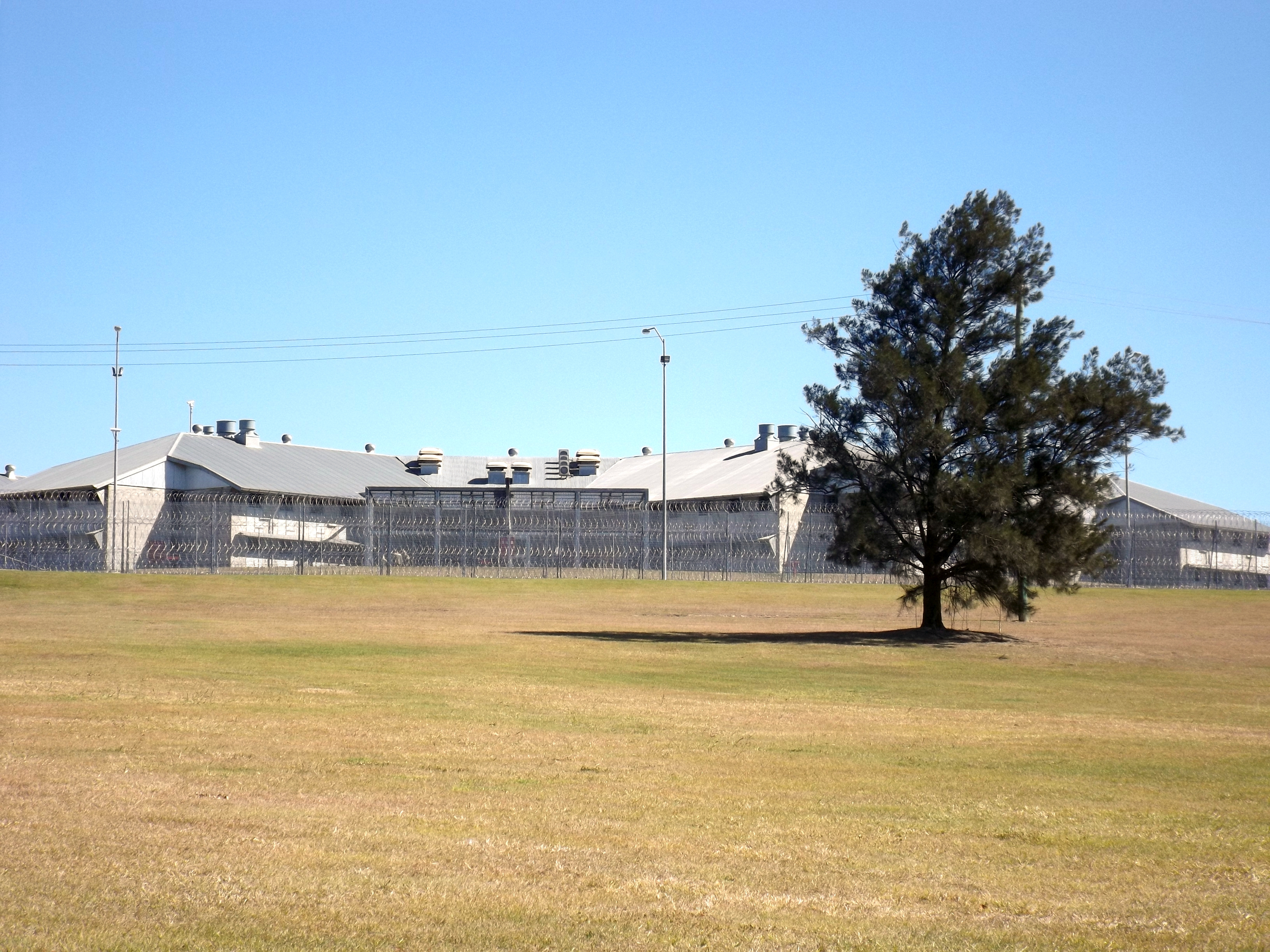
- Cell blocks, 2015
- Interactive map of Woodford Correctional Centre
- Location: Woodford, Queensland
- Status: Open
- Security class: Maximum/Medium
- Capacity: 988
- Opened: 1997

Woodford Correctional Centre is an Australian prison facility located on Neurum Road, Woodford, City of Moreton Bay, Queensland, Australia, approximately 80 kilometres north from Brisbane and 30 kilometres from Caboolture.

It is a high security facility for male prisoners with a capacity of 988 prisoners in single cell accommodation. It is the largest prison in Queensland.

Woodford Correctional Centre has a industries base with 15 workshops, that include manufacturing of furniture, steel products, upholstery, polyethylene rainwater tanks and steel rainwater tanks.

== Escape ==
On 1 April 1997, 120 prisoners managed to escape from the secure unit by 'melting' the lexen walls with toasters & other items, making their way to the central officers unit and then going on into the low security residential area where they were joined by hundreds of angry inmates protesting the new prison policy of it being a non-smoking facility. Prisoners were offered a three-month supply of nicotine patches costing the Government $42 million. It took six hours before the centre's Custodial Officers and the TRG (tactical response group) finally resumed control. Woodford Correction Centre withdrew the ban on smoking in an effort to placate inmates. Woodford Correctional Facility now has a total ban on smoking, which began in May 2014 due to a change in Queensland Government policy.

== Murders ==
Scott Lawrence Topping, 22, was serving time for $1,200 worth of unpaid traffic fines when he was murdered inside Woodford Correctional Centre, Queensland, on 12 September 1997. Topping had three weeks left to serve before his release. He would be the first person to be murdered by inmates in Woodford Correction Centre. The phrase "One day someone on fines will top themselves" is in reference to the murder of Scott Topping in prison. Mark Day was convicted of strangling 22-year-old Scott Topping at Woodford prison. Mark Day was murdered in a prison in 2003.

At the time of the murder of Scott Topping, the security CCTV systems were not fully operational.

== Notable inmates ==
- Brenden Abbott (former)
- Michael Katsidis (former)
- Alex Leapai (former)

== See also ==
- List of Australian prisons
