= Carl Davis Drumond =

Costa Rican boxer

Personal information
- Born: 9 February 1975 (age 51) Puerto Limón, Costa Rica
- Weight: Heavyweight

Boxing career
- Stance: Orthodox

Boxing record
- Total fights: 37
- Wins: 32
- Win by KO: 25
- Losses: 5

Carl Davis Drumond (born 9 February 1975) is a Costa Rican professional boxer who has challenged once for a world heavyweight title.

== Professional career ==
Drumond made his professional debut in February 2005, stopping Miguel Osorio in the first round in Limón, Costa Rica.

Upon winning all his first 26 matches (one win was over former IBF-cruiserweight-champion Kelvin Davis (boxer)) Drumond challenged Ruslan Chagaev for the WBA heavyweight title on (7 February 2009). Chagaev won on technical decision after Drumond accidentally head-butted him twice in the third and fourth rounds, leaving Chagaev with a cut on his left eye. The referee decided to stop the fight after the sixth round as blood was coming out of that cut Chagaev sustained. The judges all had Chagaev in front on the scorecards, so he was declared the winner according to WBA-rules. He lost his next fight against Derric Rossy on 31 July 2009 by unanimous decision.

== Professional boxing record ==
27 Wins (21 knockouts, 6 decisions), 3 Losses (1 knockout, 2 decisions)
Result	Record	Opponent	Type	Round	Date	Location	Notes
Win	22-9-1	(Nicaragua) Henry Saenz	KO	1	3 Nov 2011	Zapote District, San José, Costa Rica	Saenz was knocked out at 0:58 of the first round.
Loss	15-0	(Cuba) Odlanier Solis	RTD	3	20 Mar 2010	(United States) Key West, Florida, U.S.	WBC International/WBA Fedelatin Heavyweight Title. Drumond retired after the third round.
Loss	21-2	(United States) Derric Rossy	UD	10	31 Jul 2009	(United States) Hollywood, Florida, U.S.	WBC USNBC heavyweight title .
Loss	24-0-1	(Uzbekistan) Ruslan Chagaev	TD	6	7 Feb 2009	Rostock, Germany	WBA Heavyweight Title. Bout was stopped after the sixth round due to an accidental headbutt.
Win	13-8	(Argentina) Alejandro Agustin Alvarez	KO	1	30 Jun 2008	San José, Costa Rica	Alvarez was knocked out at 1:22 of the first round.
Win	21-6	(Panama) Luis Andres Pineda	UD	10	19 Apr 2008	San José, Costa Rica	
Win	27-10	(Brazil) Edegar Da Silva	KO	1	31 Jan 2008	San José, Costa Rica	Silva was knocked out at 2:18 of the first round after being knocked down thrice.
Win	24-6-2	(United States) Kelvin "Concrete" Davis	UD	10	17 Nov 2007	San José, Costa Rica	
Win	15-4-1	(Bolivia) Saul Farah	KO	2	15 Oct 2007	San José, Costa Rica	IBF Latino Heavyweight Title. Farah knocked out at 1:38 of the second round.
Win	22-32-2	(United States) Sedreck "Big Buck" Fields	UD	8	30 Jul 2007	San José, Costa Rica	
Win	18-6	(Brazil) Adenilson Rodrigues	TKO	3	30 Apr 2007	San José, Costa Rica	WBC FECARBOX Heavyweight Title. Referee stopped the bout at 1:27 of the third round.
Win	18-12-2	(Nicaragua) Walter "Litron" Palacios	TKO	5	12 Feb 2007	San José, Costa Rica	WBO Latino Heavyweight Title. Referee stopped the bout at 0:24 of the fifth round.
Win	2-3-1	(Panama) Arcenio Cuestas	KO	2	20 Nov 2006	San José, Costa Rica	
Win	15-20-1	(United States) Ramon Hayes	UD	8	13 Oct 2006	(United States) Hollywood, Florida, U.S.	
Win	11-8	(Argentina) Mariano Ramon "Chiquito" Ocampo	UD	10	18 Sep 2006	San José, Costa Rica	
Win	0-1	(Nicaragua) Milton Rodriguez	KO	1	19 Aug 2006	Limón, Costa Rica	Rodriguez was knocked out at 2:58 of the first round.
Win	1-9	(Nicaragua) David "El Nene" Orozco	KO	1	18 Jul 2006	San José, Costa Rica	Orozco was knocked out at 2:53 of the first round.
Win	17-11-2	(Nicaragua) Walter Palacios	UD	8	29 May 2006	San José, Costa Rica	
Win	0-5	(Colombia) Ambar Loboa	KO	2	30 Apr 2006	San José, Costa Rica	Loboa was knocked out at 1:52 of the second round.
Win	2-2-1	(Panama) Arcenio Cuestas	KO	2	20 Mar 2006	San José, Costa Rica	Cuestas was knocked out at 1:14 of the second round.
Win	5-3	(Nicaragua) Lester Vargas	KO	2	28 Feb 2006	San José, Costa Rica	
Win	5-2	(Nicaragua) Lester Vargas	KO	5	11 Dec 2005	Heredia, Costa Rica	
Win	--	(Costa Rica) Olger Castro	KO	1	17 Nov 2005	San José, Costa Rica	
Win	2-10	(Nicaragua) Juan Luis Gonzalez	KO	2	16 Oct 2005	San José, Costa Rica	
Win	0-2	(Nicaragua) Armando Sune	KO	1	16 Sep 2005	San José, Costa Rica	
Win	2-9	(Nicaragua) Juan Luis Gonzalez	KO	1	14 Aug 2005	San José, Costa Rica	Gonzalez knocked out at 2:34 of the first round.
Win	10-2-1	(Nicaragua) Marvin Aguilar	TKO	1	27 Jul 2005	San José, Costa Rica	Referee stopped the bout at 0:57 of the first round.
Win	--	(Costa Rica) Rene Lopez	TKO	1	30 May 2005	San José, Costa Rica	
Win	--	(Costa Rica) Jose Palacios	KO	1	28 Mar 2005	San José, Costa Rica	
Win	0-1	(Costa Rica) Miguel Osorio	KO	1	19 Feb 2005	Limón, Costa Rica	
