= St. Marys Band Club Pipe Band =

Australian pipe band

St Marys District Band Club Pipes and Drums
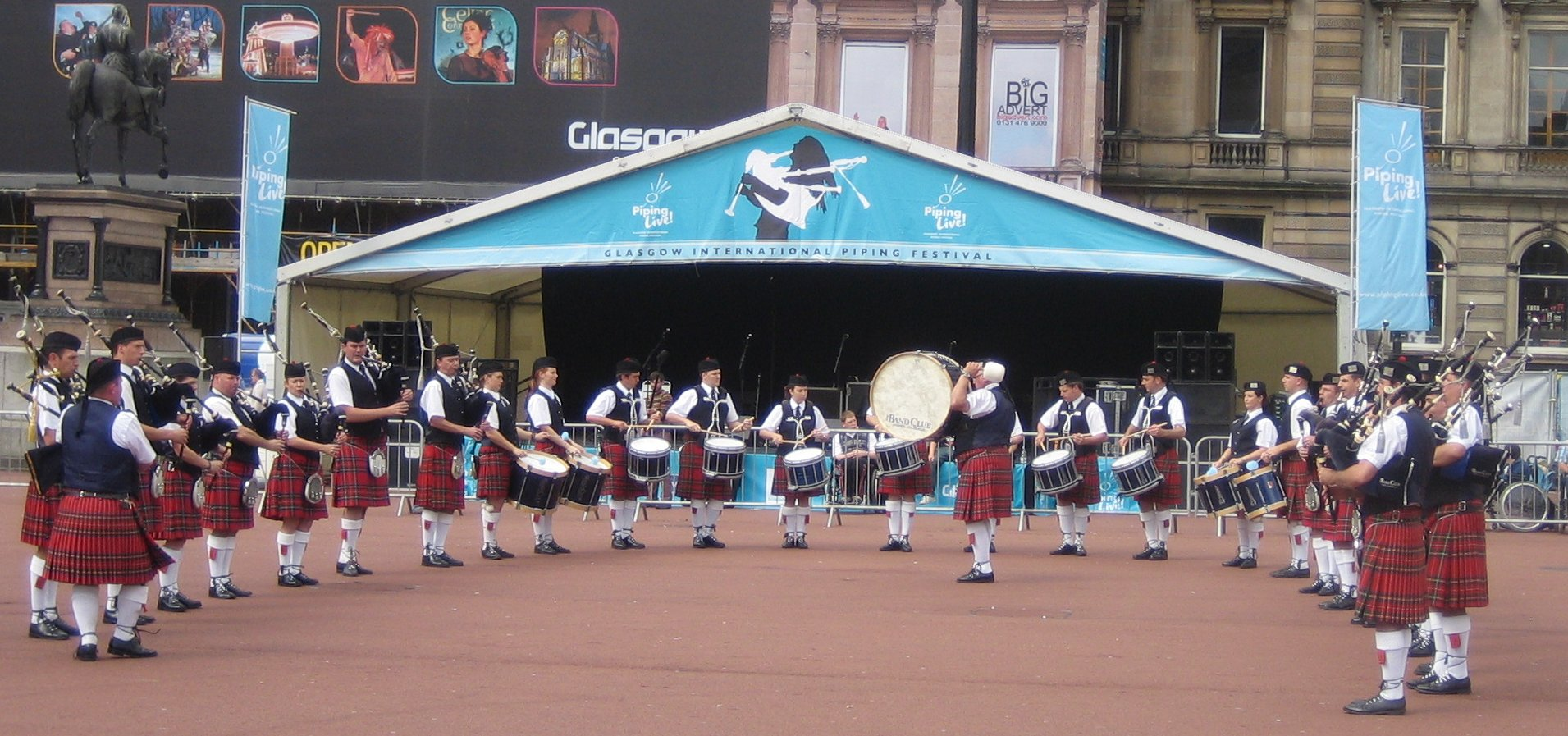
- Established: 1964
- Location: St Marys, New South Wales, Australia
- Grade: 3
- Pipe major: Hugh Strain (Chuckie)
- Drum sergeant: Geoff Crane
- Tartan: Royal Stuart
- Notable honours: 1st place Australian Pipe Band Championships, Grade 2, 2006; 3rd place World Pipe Band Championships, Grade 2, 2007, 5th place New Zealand Pipe Band Championships, Grade 1, 2008; 14th place World Pipe Band Championships, Grade 1, 2008; 1st place Australian Pipe Band Championships, Grade 1, 2008.

The St Marys District Band Club Pipes and Drums is a pipe band, based in the suburb of St Marys, New South Wales. The band has been competing in the Australian Pipe Band Championships since it was formed in 1964 and has obtained successful results. From 2005, the band competed in the World Pipe Band Championships.

In 2005 the band achieved 11th place (Grade 2) at the World Championships in Glasgow. In both 2006 and 2007 they came 3rd in the Grade 2 competition at the "Worlds" and were subsequently promoted to Grade 1 by the Australian Pipe Band Association.

In 2008, the band qualified for the Grade 1 final at the World Championships, in which they finished 14th. They also won the Grade 1 title in the Australian Championships in 2008.
