= Lauli'i =

Village in Upolu, Samoa

Coordinates: 13°51′S 171°41′W

Lauli'i is a village on the island of Upolu in Samoa. It is located on the central north coast of the island to the east of the capital Apia. Lauli'i is part of Vaimauga East Electoral Constituency (Faipule District) which forms part of the larger political district of Tuamasaga.

The population of Lauli'i is 2109.
