= Kali Meehan =

Australian boxer (born 1970)

Personal information
- Nationality: Australian
- Born: Kalivati Meehan; 9 March 1970 (age 56) Auckland, New Zealand
- Height: 1.96 m (6 ft 5 in)
- Weight: Heavyweight

Boxing career
- Stance: Orthodox

Boxing record
- Total fights: 48
- Wins: 42
- Win by KO: 32
- Losses: 6

Kalivati Gerald Meehan (born 9 March 1970) is an Australian professional boxer of Fijian descent. He turned pro after a career in rugby league. His son Willis Meehan plays rugby league and boxes.

== Amateur career ==
Before becoming professional, Meehan fought as an amateur with a record of 23–5.

== Professional career ==
Nicknamed "Meanhands", Meehan's memorable appearances include a contested loss in the WBO heavyweight title bout to Lamon Brewster, knockout loss to Hasim Rahman and a first-round technical knockout loss to Danny Williams in another title bout for the Commonwealth heavyweight title.

He had been the Australian heavyweight champion with multiple successful defences until 2000 when he vacated the title.

In October 2007, Meehan beat contender DaVarryl Williamson, knocking him down and winning via a technical knockout in the sixth round.

In February 2008, he defeated Jeremy Bates knocking him out in the third round of a 10-round bout.

In 2010 he lost to Ruslan Chagaev in May by unanimous decision and beat Evans Quinn in September, also by unanimous decision.

In 2015 he lost to Joseph Parker by technical knockout in the third round.

== Television career ==
Meehan is a co-anchor of Fight Call Out on Fox Sports

== Professional boxing record ==
48 fights	42 wins	6 losses
By knockout	32	4
By decision	10	2

No.	Result	Record	Opponent	Type	Round, time	Date	Location	Notes
48	Loss	42–6	Joseph Parker	TKO	3 (12), 1:00	15 Oct 2015	The Trusts Arena, Auckland, New Zealand	For vacant EPBC, OPBF, PABA, WBA Oceania, WBO Africa, and WBO Oriental heavyweight titles
47	Win	42–5	Shane Cameron	UD	10	22 Nov 2014	North Shore Events Centre, Auckland, New Zealand	Won vacant WBA Pan African heavyweight title
46	Win	41–5	Michael Sprott	KO	1 (3)	4 Jun 2014	The Trusts Arena, Auckland, New Zealand	Super 8 Heavyweight Tournament - Final
45	Win	40–5	Brice Ritani-Coe	UD	3	4 Jun 2014	The Trusts Arena, Auckland, New Zealand	Super 8 Heavyweight Tournament - Semi-final
44	Win	39–5	Hunter Sam	SD	3	4 Jun 2014	The Trusts Arena, Auckland, New Zealand	Super 8 Heavyweight Tournament - Quarter-final
43	Loss	38–5	Travis Walker	TKO	6 (12), 0:55	7 Mar 2012	Derwent Entertainment Centre, Hobart, Australia	Lost IBF Pan-Pacific heavyweight title
42	Win	38–4	Michael Kirby	TKO	1 (12), 1:00	24 Jun 2011	Southport Australian Football Club, Gold Coast, Australia	Won vacant WBF heavyweight title
41	Win	37–4	Valeri Semishkur	TKO	2 (6), 2:17	2 Apr 2011	Gerry Weber Stadion, Halle, Germany	
40	Win	36–4	Evans Quinn	UD	12	2 Sep 2010	Le Montage, Sydney, Australia	Won vacant IBF Pan-Pacific heavyweight title
39	Loss	35–4	Ruslan Chagaev	UD	12	22 May 2010	Stadthalle, Rostock, Germany	
38	Win	35–3	Dominique Alexander	KO	2 (8), 2:45	30 Aug 2008	Max-Schmeling-Halle, Berlin, Germany	
37	Win	34–3	Jeremy Bates	TKO	3 (10), 1:16	16 Feb 2008	Nuremberg Arena, Nuremberg, Germany	
36	Win	33–3	DaVarryl Williamson	TKO	6 (12), 3:00	6 Oct 2007	Madison Square Garden, New York City, New York, U.S.	Won vacant WBO NABO heavyweight title
35	Win	32–3	Anton Nel	KO	3 (12), 2:51	17 Nov 2006	Magic Millions, Gold Coast, Australia	Retained PABA heavyweight title
34	Win	31–3	Rogério Lobo	KO	3 (12)	31 Mar 2006	FMF Dome, Suva, Fiji	Won vacant PABA heavyweight title
33	Win	30–3	Tommy Connelly	KO	3 (10), 1:42	28 Sep 2005	Color Line Arena, Hamburg, Germany	
32	Loss	29–3	Hasim Rahman	RTD	4 (12), 3:00	13 Nov 2004	Madison Square Garden, New York City, New York, U.S.	
31	Loss	29–2	Lamon Brewster	SD	12	4 Sep 2004	Mandalay Bay Resort, Las Vegas, Nevada, U.S.	For WBO heavyweight title
30	Win	29–1	Damon Reed	TKO	6 (10), 2:35	10 Apr 2004	Mandalay Bay Resort, Las Vegas, Nevada, U.S.	
29	Win	28–1	Shane Wijohn	UD	6	27 Sep 2002	Central Coast Rugby League, Gosford, Australia	
28	Win	27–1	Colin Wilson	KO	3 (8)	19 Jul 2002	Central Coast Rugby League, Gosford, Australia	
27	Win	26–1	Tone Fiso	TKO	3 (10)	4 Mar 2002	Jupiters Hotel and Casino, Gold Coast, Australia	
26	Win	25–1	Colin Wilson	KO	8 (12)	7 Dec 2001	Wyong RSL, Wyong, Australia	Retained IBF Pan-Pacific heavyweight title
25	Win	24–1	Justin Fortune	TKO	3 (8), 0:58	28 Sep 2001	The Octagon, Sydney, Australia	
24	Loss	23–1	Danny Williams	TKO	1 (12), 0:32	9 Jun 2001	York Hall, London, England	For Commonwealth heavyweight title
23	Win	23–0	Emilio Leti	RTD	8 (12), 3:00	25 May 2001	Southport RSL, Southport, Australia	Retained WBO Asia Pacific heavyweight title
22	Win	22–0	Mosese Kavika	TKO	4 (12)	20 Apr 2001	Le Montage, Sydney, Australia	Retained IBF Pan-Pacific heavyweight title
21	Win	21–0	Colin Wilson	KO	4 (12)	9 Mar 2001	Southport RSL, Southport, Australia	Won vacant WBO Asia Pacific heavyweight title
20	Win	20–0	Tone Fiso	UD	6	15 Dec 2000	Wyong RSL, Wyong, Australia	
19	Win	19–0	Danny Buzza	TKO	1 (12)	3 Nov 2000	Star City Casino, Sydney, Australia	Won vacant IBF Pan-Pacific heavyweight title
18	Win	18–0	Don Ulhberg	TKO	3 (6), 2:26	6 Oct 2000	Seagulls Rugby League Club, Tweed Heads, Australia	
17	Win	17–0	James Grima	TKO	2 (12), 0:43	7 Jul 2000	Knox Netball Centre, Melbourne, Australia	Retained Australian heavyweight title
16	Win	16–0	Ron Brown	PTS	6	20 May 2000	Bally's Park Place, Atlantic City, New Jersey, U.S.	
15	Win	15–0	Okello Peter	KO	3 (10), 1:38	3 Nov 1999	Iizuka, Japan	
14	Win	14–0	John Justice	TKO	4 (10)	14 Oct 1999	Magic Millions, Gold Coast, Australia	
13	Win	13–0	Danny Buzza	TKO	1 (12), 2:51	18 Sep 1999	Magic Millions, Gold Coast, Australia	Retained Australian heavyweight title
12	Win	12–0	Bob Mirovic	KO	4 (12)	25 Jun 1999	Wyong RSL, Wyong, Australia	Won Australian heavyweight title
11	Win	11–0	David Ravu Ravu	KO	2 (12)	15 Oct 1998	Southport RSL, Southport, Australia	Won vacant OBA heavyweight title
10	Win	10–0	Waisiki Ligaloa	KO	3 (12), 2:29	30 Jul 1998	Southport RSL, Southport, Australia	Won South Seas heavyweight title
9	Win	9–0	Tone Fiso	PTS	10	18 Jul 1998	Downtown Convention Centre, Auckland, New Zealand	
8	Win	8–0	Colin Wilson	TKO	5 (12), 2:05	25 Jun 1998	Southport RSL, Southport, Australia	Won vacant interim OBA heavyweight title
7	Win	7–0	Joe Kingi	TKO	2 (8), 1:19	28 May 1998	Southport RSL, Southport, Australia	
6	Win	6–0	Paul Baker	TKO	1 (8), 2:47	30 Apr 1998	Southport RSL, Southport, Australia	
5	Win	5–0	James Grima	KO	4 (8)	26 Feb 1998	Southport RSL, Southport, Australia	
4	Win	4–0	Aisea Nama	PTS	6	30 Nov 1997	Downtown Convention Centre, Auckland, New Zealand	
3	Win	3–0	Finau Lavea	KO	1 (6)	19 Oct 1997	Downtown Convention Centre, Auckland, New Zealand	
2	Win	2–0	Finau Lavea	PTS	4	21 Jun 1997	Downtown Convention Centre, Auckland, New Zealand	
1	Win	1–0	Taule Mailisi	KO	1 (6)	25 May 1997	Downtown Convention Centre, Auckland, New Zealand	

== Title reigns ==
Date	Titles Held Professional	Defenses Title	Active Champion
2014	WBA Pan African heavyweight	0	active
2011	World Boxing Foundation World heavyweight	0	World Champion = Retired
2010	IBF Pan Pacific heavyweight	1	inactive
2007	WBO NABO heavyweight title	0	inactive
2006	PABA heavyweight	1	inactive
2001	WBO Asia Pacific heavyweight	1	inactive
2000	IBF Pan Pacific heavyweight	2	inactive
1999	OPBF Eliminator Heavyweight Title	0	inactive
1999	Australian heavyweight	2	inactive
1998	Oceanic Boxing Association heavyweight	1	inactive

== Awards and recognitions ==
- 2019 Gladrap Boxing Hall of fame
