= Okello Peter =

Ugandan boxer

Personal information
- Nickname: The Letter O
- Nationality: Ugandan
- Born: Okello Peter; June 19, 1972 (age 54) Kampala, Uganda
- Height: 193 cm (6 ft 4 in)

Boxing career
- Stance: Orthodox

Boxing record
- Total fights: 29
- Wins: 21
- Win by KO: 19
- Losses: 8
- Draws: 0

Okello Peter (born 19 June 1972 in Kampala) is a Ugandan-Japanese former professional boxer who competed from 1997 to 2014. He challenged for the WBC heavyweight title in 2006, and held the OPBF title from 2001 to 2006.

== Professional boxing record ==
Result	Record	Opponent	Type	Date	Location	Notes
29	21-8	(Russia) Evgeny Orlov	RTD	28 Mar 2014	Suining, China	For vacant WBC-ABCO Continental heavyweight title
28	21-7	(Japan) Kyotaro Fujimoto	TKO	25 Jul 2013	Korakuen Hall, Tokyo, Japan	For vacant Japanese heavyweight title
27	21-6	(United States) Freddie Miller	TKO	24 Nov 2012	Kunming City Stadium, Kunming, China	
26	20-6	(Samoa) Alex Leapai	KO	17 Apr 2011	Jakarta International Expo, Jakarta, Indonesia	For vacant IBF Australasian heavyweight title
25	20-5	(Samoa) Lawrence Tauasa	TKO	8 May 2010	Prefectural Gymnasium, Osaka, Osaka, Japan	
24	19-5	(Brazil) Jairo Kusunoki	KO	5 Jul 2009	International Conference Hall, Nagoya, Aichi, Japan	
23	18-5	(Russia) Oleg Maskaev	UD	10 Dec 2006	Olimpiyskiy, Moscow, Russia	For WBC heavyweight title
22	18-4	(Croatia) Bob Mirovic	UD	15 Apr 2006	Korakuen Hall, Tokyo, Japan	Retained OPBF heavyweight title
21	17-4	(Turkey) Sinan Şamil Sam	UD	11 Jun 2005	BigBox, Kempten, Bayern, Germany	For WBC International heavyweight title
20	17-3	(Japan) Ryosuke Takahashi	KO	23 Mar 2005	Korakuen Hall, Tokyo, Japan	Retained OPBF heavyweight title
19	16-3	(Fiji) Mosese Kavika	KO	20 Sep 2004	City Gymnasium, Toyoake, Japan	Retained OPBF heavyweight title
18	15-3	(Fiji) Joeli Cagi	KO	6 Jun 2004	Fukiage Hall, Nagoya, Aichi, Japan	
17	14-3	(New Zealand) Auckland Auimatagi	TKO	22 Feb 2004	Tokyo Bay NK Hall, Urayasu, Chiba, Japan	Retained OPBF heavyweight title
16	13-3	(Nigeria) Roger Izonritei	KO	27 Jul 2003	International Conference Hall, Nagoya, Aichi, Japan	Retained OPBF heavyweight title
15	12-3	(New Zealand) Colin Wilson	KO	19 Apr 2003	Korakuen Hall, Tokyo, Japan	Retained OPBF heavyweight title
14	11-3	(United States) Imamu Mayfield	UD	20 Sep 2002	(United States) New Jersey Armory, Jersey City, New Jersey, USA	
13	11-2	(New Zealand) Tone Fiso	TKO	14 Apr 2002	International Conference Hall, Nagoya, Aichi, Japan	Retained OPBF heavyweight title
12	10-2	(New Zealand) Auckland Auimatagi	TKO	23 Feb 2002	Tokyo Bay NK Hall, Urayasu, Chiba, Japan	
11	9-2	(Croatia) Bob Mirovic	KO	1 Dec 2001	City Gymnasium, Tokai, Aichi, Japan	Retained OPBF heavyweight title
10	8-2	(Fiji) Mosese Kavika	KO	21 Jul 2001	Korakuen Hall, Tokyo, Japan	Retained OPBF heavyweight title
9	7-2	(New Zealand) Tone Fiso	UD	31 Mar 2001	Nagoya, Aichi, Japan	Won vacant OPBF heavyweight title
8	6-2	(Japan) Jiro Ishikawa	KO	27 Feb 2001	Tokyo, Japan	
7	5-2	(New Zealand) Kali Meehan	KO	3 Nov 1999	Iizuka, Fukuoka, Japan	
6	5-1	(Fiji) Waisiki Ligaloa	KO	31 Jul 1999	Rainbow Hall, Nagoya, Aichi, Japan	
5	4-1	(Niue) Toakipa Tasefa	UD	20 Apr 1999	Okayama City, Okayama, Japan	For OPBF heavyweight title
4	4-0	(United States) Marcus Rhode	TKO	21 Aug 1998	Tokyo, Japan	
3	3-0	(New Zealand) Colin Wilson	TKO	29 Apr 1998	Aichi Prefectural Gym, Nagoya, Aichi, Japan	
2	2-0	(United States) Richard Jarvis	TKO	7 Mar 1998	Tokai, Aichi, Japan	
1	1-0	(Japan) Kimitaka Sakai	TKO	6 Dec 1997	Athletic Park Gym, Tsuruga, Fukui, Japan	
