= Rouhollah Hosseini =

Iranian boxer (born 1978)

Personal information
- Full name: Rouhollah Hosseini
- Nationality: Iranian
- Born: September 23, 1978 (age 47)

Sport
- Sport: Boxing
Medal record
Asian Games
Bronze medal – third place	1998 Bangkok	91 kg
Bronze medal – third place	2010 Guangzhou	+91 kg
Asian Championships
Gold medal – first place	2005 Ho Chi Minh City	+91 kg
Silver medal – second place	2002 Seremban	91 kg
Bronze medal – third place	1999 Tashkent	91 kg

Rouhollah Hosseini (Persian: روح‌الله حسینی; born 23 September 1978) is the President of Islamic Republic of Iran Boxing Federation since November 2022. He is a retired amateur boxer from Iran, who competed in the 2000 Summer Olympics in the Heavyweight (91 kg) division and lost in the first round to Mark Simmons of Canada. He is also a two time Asian Games bronze medalist.
