= World of Boxing =

Russian boxing

World of Boxing is a Russian promotion company, which organizes professional boxing fights.

The company was founded in 2012 by MIC Group president Andrey Ryabinskiy. The first fight between Wladimir Klitschko и Alexander Povetkin organized by the company was held on October 5, 2013 with the support of Rosneft. A number of Russian boxers worked with the company, including:

- (Russia) Alexander Povetkin — WBA World Heavyweight Champion (2011–13)
- (Russia) Denis Lebedev — WBA World Champion (2012–18)
- (Russia) Eduard Troyanovsky — IBF World Champion (2015–16) and IBO World Champion (2015–16)
- (Russia) Rakhim Chakhkiev — EBU European Cruiserweight Champion (2014)
- (Russia) Grigory Drozd — WBC World Champion (2014–15)
- (Russia) Dmitry Bivol — WBA World Champion (since 2017)
- (Russia) Dmitry Kudryashov — International WBA Champion (2014–16)
- (Russia) Sergei Kuzmin — WBA Inter-Continental Champion (2018–19)
- (Russia) Alexei Papin — IBF International Light heavyweight Champion (since 2019, 2018–19)
- (Uzbekistan) Shakhram Giyasov — WBA International Super Lightweight Champion
- (Uzbekistan) Murodjon Akhmadaliev — WBA Inter-Continental Super Bantamweight Champion
- (Russia) Batuhan Gözgeç — WBA Super lightweight Champion
- (Uzbekistan) Bektemir Melikuziev — The 2016 Summer Olympics silver medalist
- (Uzbekistan) Elnur Abduraimov — winner of the Asian Amateur Boxing Championships
- (Russia) Sergey Lipinets — IBF World Junior welterweight Champion.

Since 2017, Vadim Kornilov is the acting head of the company. Since then, Mir Boksa has ceased to hold major boxing events as was done in previous years.

== List of events ==
Date	Venue	Headline
April 20, 2019	Zhukovka, Moscow, Russia	Pavel Malikov — Heybatulla Hajialiyev
March 3, 2019	Turning Stone Resort Casino, Verona, New York, United States	Dmitry Bivol — Joe Smith Jr.
September 15, 2018	Kuzbass, Kemerovo, Russia	Dmitry Kudryashov — Alexandru Jour
June 23, 2018	Zhukovka, Moscow, Russia	Alexei Papin — Willbeforce Shihepo
March 17, 2018	Zhukovka, Moscow, Russia	George Chelokhsaev — Fabio Amitrano
November 27, 2017	Luzhniki, Moscow, Russia	Eduard Troyanovsky — Carlos Manuel Portillo
July 1, 2017	Luzhniki, Moscow, Russia	Alexander Povetkin — Andriy Rudenko
June 3, 2017	Rostov-on-Don Palace of Sports, Rostov-on-Don, Russia	Dmitry Kudryashov — Olanrewaju Durodola
March 4, 2017	Balashikha Arena, Balashikha, Russia	Alexei Papin — Sergio Angel
February 23, 2017	Forum, Nizhny Tagil, Russia	Dmitry Bivol — Robert Berridge
December 17, 2016	Ekaterinburg Expo, Yekaterinburg, Russia	Alexander Povetkin — Johann Duhaupas
December 3, 2016	Megasport Sport Palace, Moscow, Russia	Denis Lebedev — Murat Gassiev
May 21, 2016	Megasport Sport Palace, Moscow, Russia	Denis Lebedev — Victor Emilio Ramírez
April 8, 2016	Soviet Wings Sport Palace, Moscow, Russia	Eduard Troyanovsky — César Cuenca
November 4, 2015	TatNeft Arena, Kazan, Russia	Alexander Povetkin — Mariusz Wach
May 22, 2015	Luzhniki, Moscow, Russia	Alexander Povetkin — Mike Perez
April 3, 2015	Luzhniki, Moscow, Russia	Denis Lebedev — Youri Kalenga
November 28, 2014	Luzhniki, Moscow, Russia	Ruslan Provodnikov — José Luis Castillo
October 24, 2014	Luzhniki, Moscow, Russia	Alexander Povetkin — Carlos Takam
September 27, 2014	Krylatskoye Sports Palace, Moscow, Russia	Krzysztof Włodarczyk — Grigory Drozd
May 30, 2014	Luzhniki, Moscow, Russia	Alexander Povetkin — Manuel Charr
April 25, 2014 (не состоялся)	Krylatskoye Sports Palace, Moscow, Russia	Denis Lebedev — Guillermo Jones
March 15, 2014	Krylatskoye Sports Palace, Moscow, Russia	Grigory Drozd — Jeremy Houanaa
October 5, 2013	Olympic Stadium (Moscow), Moscow, Russia	Alexander Povetkin — Wladimir Klitschko
