= Alexander Povetkin =

Russian boxer (born 1979)

Alexander Povetkin Алекса́ндр Пове́ткин
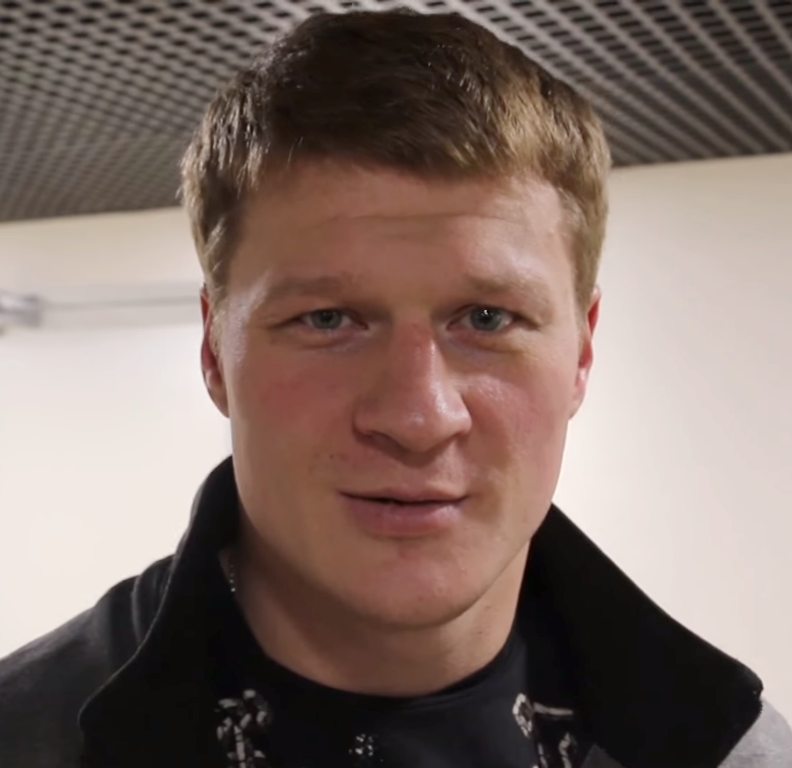
- Povetkin in 2015

Personal information
- Nicknames: Sasha; Russian Vityaz; White Lion
- Nationality: Russian
- Born: 2 September 1979 (age 47) Kursk, Russian SFSR, Soviet Union
- Height: 1.88 m (6 ft 2 in)
- Weight: Heavyweight

Boxing career
- Reach: 190 cm (75 in)
- Stance: Orthodox

Boxing record
- Total fights: 40
- Wins: 36
- Win by KO: 25
- Losses: 3
- Draws: 1
Medal record
Men's amateur boxing
Representing Russia
Olympic Games
Gold medal – first place	2004 Athens	Super-heavyweight
World Championships
Gold medal – first place	2003 Bangkok	Super-heavyweight
European Championships
Gold medal – first place	2002 Perm	Super-heavyweight
Gold medal – first place	2004 Pula	Super-heavyweight
European Junior Championships
Gold medal – first place	2002 Perm	Super-heavyweight
Strandzha Cup
Gold medal – first place	2002 Bulgaria	Super-heavyweight
Gold medal – first place	2003 Bulgaria	Super-heavyweight

Alexander Vladimirovich Povetkin (Russian: Алекса́ндр Влади́мирович Пове́ткин; born 2 September 1979) is a Russian former professional boxer who competed from 2005 to 2021. He held the World Boxing Association (WBA) (Regular version) heavyweight title from 2011 to 2013; the World Boxing Council (WBC) (Interim version) heavyweight title from 2020 to 2021; and challenged twice for the unified heavyweight championship in 2013 and 2018.

As an amateur, Povetkin won gold medals in the super-heavyweight division at the 2002 and 2004 European Championships, 2003 World Championships, and 2004 Olympics. After turning professional in 2005, he defeated Ruslan Chagaev to claim the inaugural WBA (Regular) title in 2011. After performing five consecutive defenses, he challenged Wladimir Klitschko for the WBA (Super), IBF, WBO, IBO, and The Ring titles in 2013, suffering his first professional career loss by unanimous decision. In 2018, Povetkin would challenge again for the WBA (Super), IBF, WBO, and IBO titles, this time against Anthony Joshua, and lost by seventh-round technical knockout.

He was rated in the top ten annual heavyweights by BoxRec from 2006 to 2020, and rated in the top five annual heavyweights from 2007 to 2020, except for 2019. He is a one-time winner of the WBC KO of the Year (2020) and Premier Boxing Champions Knockout of the Year (2020).

== Amateur career ==
After a successful amateur kickboxing career that included winning World Junior championship in 1997, a World title in 1999 and a European professional kickboxing title in 2000, Povetkin won his first major boxing tournament at the Russian Championships in 2000 at the age of 21. This would be the beginning of several major amateur tournaments Povetkin would go on to win including; the Good Will Games in Brisbane, Australia in 2001; the 34th European Championship in 2002; the XII World Championship in 2003 held in Thailand; and the 35th European Championship in 2004. His amateur success would culminate in winning the gold medal at super-heavyweight (>91 kg) boxing at the 2004 Summer Olympics in Athens, Greece, in a walkover match over Egyptian Mohamed Aly. After taking Olympic Gold, he concluded his amateur career with a record of 125–7, with all losses avenged.

== Professional career ==
=== 2005–2007: Early career ===
Povetkin's early career was without renown. He first pulled notice when, after compiling a perfect record of 12–0, he defeated veteran Larry Donald on 30 June 2007 by unanimous decision in Moscow in his 13th professional fight.

=== 2007–2011: IBF heavyweight title tournament ===
The win over Donald was considered solid, and Povetkin continued his emergence as a promising heavyweight boxing contender.

On 27 October 2007 Povetkin met Chris Byrd, who had lost his title to Klitschko the year before. Povetkin won by way of an 11th-round TKO victory. Byrd put up more resistance than Donald, but ultimately was overwhelmed, and his corner threw in the towel.

Less than a week later, Eddie Chambers won a split decision victory over former title challenger Calvin Brock. This advanced Povetkin and Chambers to the final round of the tournament. On 26 January 2008, after initial problems Povetkin defeated Chambers by unanimous decision to become the mandatory challenger for Klitschko. On 19 July 2008, Povetkin knocked out Taurus Sykes in the fourth round.

=== 2011–2013: WBA heavyweight champion ===
==== Povetkin vs. Chagaev ====
After Wladimir Klitschko unified his WBO and IBF titles with David Haye's WBA title, Klitschko was upgraded to "Super Champion" by the WBA, thus making the "Regular Champion" title vacant. On 6 July 2011 negotiations for Povetkin to fight former WBA champion Ruslan Chagaev (27–1–1, 17 KOs) for the vacant title began between Sauerland, who promote Povetkin, and Chagaev's promoter Universum. Two days later, Povetkin's trainer confirmed the fight would take place on 27 August. At the time of the bout, Povetkin was ranked No.3 heavyweight contender by The Ring, while Chagaev was ranked No.4 contender by the same publication. There were concerns about Chagaev's health state, due to him being diagnosed with hepatitis B and the possibility of him infecting Povetkin. Chagaev, however, insisted that the medical examination had confirmed that his opponents (Povetkin included) weren't in danger of being infected. Most observers expected the fight to be close, giving Povetkin the edge in youth and athletic ability, while also giving Chagaev an advantage in terms of experience. Both fighters were given an even chance to win. Former WBA world champion Nikolai Valuev predicted Povetkin to win by decision or knockout in the championship rounds. The card was televised by Das Erste.

With Teddy Atlas in his corner, Povetkin bested Chagaev by unanimous decision to capture the WBA (Regular) heavyweight title. Both fighters were active from the opening bell, with Povetkin appearing to have the upper hand in the first half of the fight, frequently closing the distance and working Chagaev's body, while blocking most Chagaev's shots with arms and gloves. Povetkin staggered Chagaev with an uppercut in the third round. Chagaev regained composure in the middle rounds, hurting tired Povetkin several times with clubbing left hooks. Povetkin withstood Chagaev's attacks and re-established his pressure going into the championship rounds, while Chagaev appeared to be saving energy for the last rounds. The twelfth round saw both fighters trading shots. The bout went full twelve rounds, with Povetkin being declared the winner by unanimous decision. The scores were 116–112 (twice) and 117–113, all in favor of Povetkin. According to CompuBox, Povetkin landed 152 punches out of 533 thrown (28.5%) with 112 landed power shots (39.6%), while Chagaev landed 72 punches out of 416 thrown (17.1%) with 62 power punches (35.2%). Povetkin landed more shots in every round and also landed more power punches in all but the first two rounds (2nd round being even).

Following the fight, 48 year old former world champion Evander Holyfield entered the ring to congratulate Povetkin. Holyfield also attended the post-fight press conference and made the intention of challenging Povetkin for the WBA's secondary title. Povetkin announced his first defence would be in December 2011, possibly in Zurich, Switzerland.

==== Povetkin vs. Boswell ====
On 16 October 2011, a fight between Povetkin and 42 year old American heavyweight contender Cedric Boswell (35–1, 26 KOs) was close to being confirmed for 3 December at the Hartwall Arena in Helsinki. Boswell was on a 14-fight win streak since his sole defeat to former four-time world title challenger Jameel McCline. The fight was originally offered to former WBC champion Hasim Rahman, who asked for more money than Sauerland Event's could offer. Povetkin's team then spoke to the WBA about possible opponents. Most of the ranked fighters were not willing to travel to fight Povetkin, where as some contenders were not available. French heavyweight Jean Marc Mormeck turned down the opportunity to fight Povetkin because he was being lined up to challenge then-unified world champion Wladimir Klitschko. On 21 October, Boswell confirmed that he had signed the deal and a day later, a heavyweight double-header was announced for 3 December, with the other fight being Robert Helenius vs. Derek Chisora. Povetkin already started his training with Kostya Tszyu and cruiserweight contender Denis Lebedev and in mid-October, Teddy Atlas joined the training camp. Povetkin won the fight by 8th-round KO. At the time of the stoppage, Povetkin was ahead 70–63, 69–64, and 70–63 on the scorecards. Povetkin came alive in the fight at the midway point, rocking Boswell a few times with some hard punches. In the 8th round, Povetkin connected with a combination that dropped Boswell and eventually counted out. Boswell managed to get to his feet after the count had finished, only to fall back down.

==== Povetkin vs. Huck ====
In December 2011, a deal was reached for Povetkin to make his second defence against then WBO cruiserweight champion Marco Huck (34–1, 25 KOs) on 25 February 2012 at Porsche Arena in Stuttgart, Baden-Württemberg. Huck made the challenge in the post fight press conference of Povetkin's win over Boswell. It was noted that Huck would not vacate his WBO title, until after the fight, where he would assess the situation. Huck stated if he was to win the title, he would likely remain at heavyweight to challenge one of the Klitschko brothers, but would be given 10 days by the WBO to decide. Huck reached out to David Haye and Evander Holyfield to help with sparring. In January 2012, the promoters of Huck, Povetkin and Rahman attended a meeting where they discussed the winner of Povetkin vs. Huck would defend the WBA title against Rahman next. During this time, trainer Teddy Atlas was in contract for Povetkin to come train in the USA but Povetkin refused, then Teddy Atlas announced he had parted ways with Povetkin. Russian trainer Alexander Zimin stepped in on short notice. For his debut at heavyweight, Huck weighed 209.4 pounds and Povetkin weighed 229.2 pounds.

Povetkin won the fight via majority decision. The fight proved to be a tough test for Povetkin. One judge scored the fight a 114–114 draw, whilst the remaining two judges scoring the fight 116–113, and 116–112 in favour of Povetkin. All three ringside announcers from EPIX scored the fight in favour of Huck. Chisora and Dimitrenko, who were sat ringside, scored the fight a draw. Arthur Abraham and Tomasz Adamek scored the fight clearly for Huck. The opening round started off slow however Povetkin started taking over the fight landing body shots and using his straight rights. In round 4, Huck began to let his hands go and found his range, even rocking Povetkin. Huck controlled the championship rounds as Povetkin began to show signs of fatigue. Huck came close to dropping Povetkin in the final round. After the fight, Povetkin admitted, "I underestimated him. Perhaps I didn't take this fight seriously enough." Huck said, "A lot of people who saw this fight see me as the winner." It was reported that Huck had injured his right between rounds 6 and 7. The verdict was met with boos around the arena.

==== Povetkin vs. Rahman, Wawrzyk ====
Despite rematch called for Povetkin vs. Huck, Team Sauerland firmly stated that as previously negotiated, a fight with former WBC world champion Hasim Rahman (50–7–2, 41 KOs) would be next. It was originally for 14 July 2012 at Upton Park in West Ham, London, with David Haye vs. Derek Chisora as the main event. The venue was later changed to Alsterdorfer Sporthalle in Alsterdorf, Hamburg. On 28 June, Rahman pulled out with a hand injury. The fight was rescheduled for 29 September with Kubrat Pulev vs. Alexander Ustinov for the European title as co-feature. The opening round saw very little action between both fighters. Round 2 saw Povetkin come out throwing and landing at will with Rahman spending most of the round against the ropes. Rahman did not throw back and eventually referee Gustavo Padilla stepped in to stop the fight. At the same time, Rahman's corner appeared to be on the ring apron with a towel. The fight was slated as a miss-match. After the fight, Povetkin said, "I'm ready to fight everybody. When (my handlers) say it's time to fight Klitschko, I will be ready. He's the best heavyweight in the world and I will be ready to fight him." According to CompuBox Stats, Povetkin landed 42 of 85 punches thrown (49%), this included 33 power punches and Rahman landed 10 of his 44 thrown (23%), 2 of which were power shots.

In April 2013, prior to a big showdown with Wladimir Klitschko, Povetkin chose to fight Andrzej Wawrzyk (27–0, 13 KOs) on 17 May, in a voluntary title defence. Team Sauerland revealed as part of the deal, if Wawrzyk pulled an upset, he would sign with Sauerland Event on a 3-fight deal. The fight took place at the Crocus City Hall in Moscow. Like most of Povetkin's fights, the first round had very little action. Povetkin dropped Wawrzyk in round 2 with a right hand. Wawrzyk beat the count and barely made it to the end of the round. In round 3, Povetkin carried on landing big punches, dropping Wawrzyk a further two times before the referee intervened to stop the fight. In the post-fight, Povetkin said, "I just wanted to show some offensive arsenal. I trained for a longer fight but, well, it has ended pretty fast. We didn't plan to win by a TKO."

==== Povetkin vs. Klitschko ====
At the end of 2012, the World Boxing Association ordered its super-champion Wladimir Klitschko (60–3, 52 KOs) to fight regular-champion Povetkin by 24 February 2013, but the two sides couldn't reach an agreement. WBA let Klitschko have another voluntary title defence before taking on Povetkin, but there should have been a signed contract with Povetkin before 28 February, with a new deadline for their bout no later than 31 July.

Promoter Vladimir Hryunov won the right to promote Klitschko vs. Povetkin with a purse bid of $23,333,330 and Russian businessman Andrey Ryabinsky putting up the money. Failed bids made were from K2 Promotions ($7,130,000) and Povetkin's promoter Sauerland Event ($6,014,444). It allowed Ryabinsky to dictate the location of the fight and guaranteed the fighters the biggest purses of their careers. Based on being entitled to 75 percent of the winning bid, Klitschko got $17,499,997, while Povetkin received $5,833,333. The Klitschko camp were said to be surprised by the bid. The fight was expected to generate around 100 million viewers in Europe. It was reported that the President of Russia Vladimir Putin was going to attend the fight.

The fight took place in October 2013, Klitschko's third consecutive undefeated opponent. The bout was marred with over 160 clinches, most initiated by Klitschko, followed by several repeated roughhouse tactics throughout the match. This included Klitschko's leaning on his opponent and pushing his head down and throwing Povetkin away to prevent Povetkin from clinching, which resulted in the referee scoring some of Povetkin's fallings as knockdowns, as well as Povetkin's punching after referee's break command and leaning his head too low. Klitschko won by unanimous decision scoring a knockdown in round 2 from a quick left hook, and 3 knockdowns in round 7 including one prompted from a straight right hand. All 3 judges scored it 119–104 on the scorecards. Klitschko landed 139 of 417 punches (33%) and Povetkin connected on 59 of 283 (21%). After the fight, Klitschko told in the interview that he had little desire to go for the knockout as the Russian crowd would be disappointed, which lead to speculations about the alleged agreement between the champion and organisers to let the bout go the distance, which Klitschko later denied. With 9.2 rating, the fight became the most popular sporting event on Russian television in 2013, as well as the most watched TV program of the year in Moscow with a 13.9 rating, surpassing the Moscow Victory Day Parade. Overall, the fight was watched by 23 million people in Russia.

=== 2014–2015: Return victories ===
==== Povetkin vs. Charr, Takam ====
Povetkin bounced back in 2014, completely changing his training routine and diet. On 2 May 2014, it was confirmed that he would fight former world title challenger, WBC #7 ranked Mahmoud Charr (26–1, 15 KOs) on 30 May. Povetkin claimed the vacant WBC International title after stopping Charr in 7 rounds. Both fighters started off strong with Charr landing his jab, however at the same time, Povetkin managed to land big uppercuts. Over the next three rounds, both fighters continued to press on the attack. At the end of round 4, Charr had managed to only win one round on all three judges scorecards. In round 7, Povetkin landed a three-punch combination which dropped Charr, flat on his back. Referee Massimo Barrovecchio did not count and stopped the fight immediately at 1 minute and 9 seconds.

In August 2014, it was announced a deal was close to being reached which would see Povetkin challenge French-Cameroonian contender Carlos Takam (30–1–1, 23 KOs) for his WBC Silver heavyweight title. A few days later, World of Boxing promoter Andrei Ryabinsky stated the contracts had been signed for the fight to take place on 24 October at the Palace of Sports in Luzhniki. In what was considered a back and forth fight and potential fight of the year, Povetkin scored a round 10 KO win to secure the WBC Silver title. At the end of round 4, two judges had Takam ahead 39–37 and 39–38, whilst the remaining judge had Povetkin ahead 39–37. From round 8, Povetkin began to increase the number of punches he was throwing and in round 9, referee Kenny Bayless issued a standing 8-count to Takam after Povetkin landed some unanswered shots, which had Takam held up by the ropes. Takam failed to recover and in round 10, Povetkin landed a left hook to his chin, dropping Takam. Bayless waved the fight off immediately. BoxingScene.com voted the final punch as their knockout of the year for 2014.

==== Povetkin vs. Perez, Wach ====
It was announced that Povetkin's next fight against Irish based Cuban contender Mike Perez (21–1–1, 13 KOs) would take place on 22 May 2015 and serve as a final eliminator for the WBC heavyweight title, held by American boxer Deontay Wilder. Due to the winner potentially being next in line to challenge Wilder, ESPN announced they would air the fight live on ESPN3.com. Povetkin earned a mandatory title shot by knocking out Perez in the first round in devastating fashion. The fight lasted just 91 seconds. Povetkin sent the southpaw Perez down with three right hands. Perez beat the count, then took a beating on the ropes, ending the contest.

In August 2015, a deal was reached for Povetkin to fight once beaten former world title challenger Mariusz Wach (31–1, 17 KOs) in Kazan, Russia on 4 November 2015. Wach had previously gone 12 rounds with Wladimir Klitschko. The fight would be the main event of a packed Russian card that featured multiple world title fights. After the fight was announced, Povetkin spoke of his disappointment of not being able to land Wilder on the same date. Wach started off the fight with success, keeping the smaller Povetkin at range with his jab. But as the rounds went on, Povetkin was able to find his range and begin to push Wach around the ring with combinations on the inside. Towards the end of the fight, with both participants cut, Povetkin urged the referee stoppage as he deemed Wach, who was being hit at will essentially, unable to continue. On the morning of the fight, the WBC approved another voluntary defence for Wilder, which would likely take place in January 2016. This meant the potential Wilder vs. Povetkin fight would take place around May 2016. Wach allegedly only received 10% of his purse, due to his ongoing difficulties with his promoter Jimmy Burchfield. In December, it was reported that Wach failed a post-fight drug test.

=== 2016: WBC heavyweight title contention ===
==== Povetkin vs. Wilder, cancellation ====
It was announced that Povetkin would fight WBC World Champion Deontay Wilder (36–0, 35 KOs) in Moscow, Russia, on a date set to yet be announced at the Megasport Arena. It was originally set for May 21, 2016. However, on May 14, it was reported that Povetkin had failed a drug test. The fight was put in jeopardy after he tested positive for the banned substance meldonium. Promotor Andrei Ryabinsky added that Povetkin did take meldonium last year, but stopped before it was banned, and only "leftover traces of meldonium at a very low concentration" were found in a blood sample given by the 36-year-old last month. It was reported on May 15, that the assertion from Povetkin's promoter that it was in his system only because he took it late last year, before it was banned, appeared untrue. The WBC announced on May 15, a week before the fight that it would be postponed. On May 31, it was announced on Sky Sports by Povetkin's promoters that new drug test results prove the Povetkin is a clean athlete. The new doping test, taken May 17, showed no traces of meldonium. This was reported by VADA.

==== Povetkin vs. Stiverne, cancellation ====
With Wilder out until early 2017, the WBC ordered mandatory challenger Povetkin to fight former world champion Bermane Stiverne for the interim WBC heavyweight title. Stiverne previously held the WBC title losing his first defence to Wilder. The winner would eventually go on to challenge Wilder upon his return for the full version of the title. A purse bid was scheduled for October 10. The purse bid was won by World of Boxing promoter Andrey Ryabinsky. The winning bid was $3.165 million, beating out the two other bids, one from Don King for $2.1 million and another from Eye of the Tiger promotions for $542,000. Povetkin and Stiverne are due to earn a base purse of $1,424,250 each due to a 50–50 split, with the winner receiving the remainder $316,500 as a bonus.

On November 11, the WBC were told by VADA that Stiverne had tested positive on a drug test. It was said that the banned substance was methylhexaneamine, which is also known as dimethylamylamine or 'DMAA'. Povetkin's camp confirmed the fight will still go ahead. Stiverne claimed he ingested a post-workout supplement called SUPERPHARM without knowing it included dimethylamylamine, but under VADA’s rules an athlete is responsible for whatever goes into their body. The WBC took into account that it was Stiverne’s first offence when making its ruling and fined him $75,000. Just 20 hours before the fight was to take place, the WBC withdrew its sanction of the fight stating Povetkin had failed another drug test, this time for Ostarine. The test was taken of December 6. Stiverne later made a statement to tell everyone he will be heading home to Las Vegas and did not want to fight if the sanction was off, as that was the whole reason for him training and taking the fight in Russia. Following the cancellation, Stiverne's promoter Don King stated he would be filing a lawsuit against World of Boxing promoter Andrey Ryabinsky, just as Ryabinsky did against King when Lebedev pulled out of his scheduled rematch against Guillermo Jones, after Jones tested positive for a second time. At that time, Ryabinsky was awarded $1.6m in damages. On December 23, Ryabinsky stated that Povetkin's sample from December 13 came back negative. Ryabinsky claimed that the test where he had tested positive contained 0.00000000001g traces of ostarine and a previous random test in November also came back negative.

==== Povetkin vs. Duhaupas ====
After Stiverne withdrew himself from the title claiming he would be heading home, there was ongoing talks for WBC Silver heavyweight champion Johann Duhaupas (34–3, 21 KOs) to step in and fight Povetkin instead. Hours later it was confirmed that the fight would take place on short notice with no titles at stake. Povetkin dominated and knocked out Duhaupas in the 6th round. Povetkin had Duhaupas hurt in the 4th round after connecting with a right hand to the head. The end came when Povetkin hurt Duhaupas with two left hooks to the head in round 6 to knock him down and out. The fight was halted by the referee, as Duhaupas was badly hurt from the left hands. The official time of the stoppage was at 2:59 of the 6th round.

=== 2017–2018: Rebuilding career ===
==== Fine and suspension ====
On March 3, 2017, Povetkin was handed a fine of $250,000 and banned indefinitely by the World Boxing Council for failing drug tests. Their ban meant they would no longer sanction his fights. It was also noted on the documents presented by the WBC that Povetkin would be allowed to apply in March 2018 to be included in the rankings. The lifetime ban was lifted by the WBC on 8 December 2017. It was announced that Povetkin would be inserted back into the WBC rankings from January 2018.

==== Povetkin vs. Rudenko ====
On 16 May 2017 it was confirmed that Povetkin would return to the ring on 1 July in Moscow. In a statement, Povetkin said: "I do not care with who I fight with. I'm sure my team will pick me a good interesting opponent, with whom we will have a spectacular fight. My job is to train and show good boxing ability. I'm ready to fight against any opponent." His promoter, Andrei Ryabinsky was in talks with several candidates. On 24 May, it was announced that Povetkin would fight Andriy Rudenko (31–2, 19 KOs), who was ranked 9th by the WBO; and 13th by the WBC and IBF. The fight was being billed as a "Battle of Russia vs. Ukraine", despite the fact that Rudenko was relatively unknown in Ukraine, where the fight was featured on rather smaller TV channel XSPORT instead of Inter. Rudenko was on a seven-fight winning streak following back-to-back losses to Lucas Browne and Hughie Fury. On 14 June, the WBO decided to sanction the bout and announced that the vacant WBO International heavyweight title would be at stake.

Soon after the fight began Rudenko had problems right away. The fight almost came to an end in the first round after Povetkin accidentally hit Rudenko in the back of his neck with an overhand punch in the middle of a clinch. Rudenko spent five minutes complaining that he had injured his neck while Povetkin waited patiently in the corner to resume but fans in attendance began to whistle in displeasure at Rudenko whom they saw as feigning injury. The ringside doctor determined that Rudenko had a spasm and that Rudenko wanted to pull out of the fight. However the referee eventually persuaded Rudenko to continue. During the interval between rounds eight and nine Rudenko again wanted to stop the fight but his corner firmly insisted on continuing. Povetkin went on to control every round winning a one-sided fight on all three judges scorecards 120–109, 120–108, and 120–108. Along with the WBO International title Povetkin also won the WBA Continental title. Following the win the IBF re-instated Povetkin into the rankings for July 2017. He was placed at No. 13 ranking.

==== Povetkin vs. Hammer ====
On 10 October 2017, it was revealed that Povetkin would return to fight at the DIVS in Yekaterinburg on 15 December. It was rumoured that his opponent would be No. 2 WBO Christian Hammer (22–4, 12 KOs) in a title eliminator. #4 WBO Tom Schwrtz was also considered. Povetkin's promoter, World of Boxing stated the WBO International title would be at stake. At the time, Hammer was on a five-fight win streak since his last loss, to the hands of Tyson Fury in February 2015. On 23 October, Alexei Titov, executive director of RCC Boxing Promotions who were working to organise the event, stated that he would attend WBO's annual convention in the next week and ask them to sanction the bout as a final eliminator. On 31 October, Hammer's promoter Erol Ceylan of EC Boxpromotion confirmed the bout. A month prior to the fight, Povetkin's manager announced that former cruiserweight contender BJ Flores (34–3–1, 21 KOs), who had previously called out Povetkin, would be on standby as a replacement in case Hammer withdrew or could not make the fight. A deal could not be reached with Flores, and instead Japanese contender Kyotaro Fujimoto (18–1, 10 KOs) signed the contract to become the back-up. On 8 November, the WBC announced that they would be lifting the lifetime ban effective immediately from 7 December 2017. From this date, WBC would start a probation period which would end on 6 December 2018. The ruling also stated that Povetkin would be re-instated in the WBC rankings in January 2018. Povetkin outworked a survival-oriented Hammer to win a lopsided 12 round unanimous decision, in what was a final eliminator to the WBA title, held by Anthony Joshua. The three judges' scores were 120–107, 120–108, and 118–108. The referee had warned Hammer repeatedly to stop putting Povetkin in headlocks, but he did not stop, eventually having a point deducted in round 7. Hammer came alive towards the end of each round, landing some big shots, at times knocking Povetkin off balance. After the fight, promoter Andrey Ryabinskiy said, “I have confirmation from WBA that Anthony Joshua must fight the winner of Povetkin-Hammer.”

==== Povetkin vs. Price ====
On 16 January 2018, after unification fight Anthony Joshua vs. Joseph Parker was announced, promoter Eddie Hearn offered Povetkin an opportunity to fight on the undercard, which would take place on 31 March at the Principality Stadium in Cardiff, Wales. Contenders Derek Chisora and David Price were mentioned as potential opponents. The next day, Price spoke to Sky Sports stating they accepted Hearn's offer and would be willing to fight Povetkin. On 30 January, Hearn told a reporter a deal was close being done after Povetkin also agreed to the fight. Three days later, the fight was officially confirmed. Povetkin won the fight via knockout in round 5. Povetkin badly hurt Price with a right hand, who was then defenceless, Povetkin finished off with a left hook that put Price down flat on the canvas. Without a count, referee Howard John Foster halted the fight. The official time of the stoppage was at 1:02 of round 5. In round 3, Povetkin knocked Price down with a right hand to the head. Price got up and came back strong landing some hard punches of his own. Price hurt Povetkin late in round 3 with a left hook which resulted in Povetkin falling backwards towards the ropes. The referee ruled it a knockdown due to the ropes holding Povetkin up. Price did not take advantage of the knockdown, but it looked as though he had tired himself out. With the win, Povetkin was now in position to become Anthony Joshua's mandatory challenger from the WBA and WBO. Joshua picked up the WBO title in defeating Joseph Parker in the main event. Dillian Whyte, who at the time was ranked WBC #1 stated he would fight Povetkin.

==== Povetkin vs. Joshua ====
From April up until the end of June 2018, both camps of Anthony Joshua (21–0, 20 KOs) and Deontay Wilder were in deep talks around the super fight to finally take place. The main hurdles were split, date and venue. At one point Wilder had agreed to fight Joshua in the UK, however there was slight confusions in the contracts that were being sent back and forth. At the same time, Hearn was also working a deal out for Joshua to fight WBA mandatory challenger Povetkin. The WBA initially ordered the fight after Povetkin knocked out David Price on the Joshua-Parker undercard. Negotiations took a turn on 26 June when the WBA gave Joshua's camp 24 hours to finalise a deal with Povetkin. With Joshua closer to fighting Povetkin in September 2018, Hearn stated the Joshua-Wilder fight would still take place in April 2019 at Wembley Stadium. Hearn later explained that the WBA would have granted an exemption, had Wilder signed a deal to fight Joshua.

On 5 July, Hearn announced the Wembley Stadium in London would host Joshua's next two fights on 22 September 2018 and again on 13 April 2019. On 16 July, Joshua vs. Povetkin for the WBA, IBF, WBO and IBO heavyweight titles was officially announced for 22 September on Sky Box Office. Many British pundits and trainers spoke around how Joshua should not underestimate Povetkin and how he would pose a big threat to Joshua.

In front of nearly 80,000 in attendance, Joshua overcame a short struggle, eventually coming out with a victory in round 7 through TKO to retain his world titles. Using his movement and coming in and out, Povetkin had Joshua hurt early on with his big shots. In round 2, Joshua's nose began to bruise. From round 5, Povetkin began to tire. Joshua dropped Povetkin with a left hand to the head in round 7. Povetkin got back up but Joshua was straight back in with a flurry of hard shots, before the referee mercifully stopped the fight. At the time of stoppage, the three judges scorecards were 58–56, 58–56, and 59–55 in favour of Joshua.

In the post-fight interview, Joshua stated, "I've got my knockout streak back and I found my right hand again. Alexander Povetkin is a very tough challenge. He provided that, he was good with left hook. I realized he was strong to the head but weak to the body so I was switching it up. Every jab takes a breath out of you and I slowed him down." He then announced he would post a poll on Twitter asking the fans who they would like to see him fight next. Compubox Punch stats showed that Joshua landed 90 of 256 punches thrown (35%), with 53 of them landed being jabs. Povetkin landed 47 of his 181 thrown (26%). Povekin connected with 43 power shots compared to the 37 Joshua landed. There was also a huge size advantage in favour of Joshua, who weighed 246 pounds to Povetkin's 222 pounds. It was reported that Joshua would earn around £20 million and Povetkin would earn around £6 million for the fight.

In November 2018, according to his promoter Andrei Ryanbinsky, Povetkin would retire after two more fights.

=== 2019–2021: Later career ===
By the end of December 2018, Povetkin recovered from elbow operations following his loss to Joshua and stated he would start a training camp in January 2019, hoping for a fight in April. Povetkin expected his return to the ring would take place in either the UK or US. A few names had been reported such as Dillian Whyte and Oleksandr Usyk. On 4 March, it was reported that Usyk would fight either Povetkin or Carlos Takam on 18 May 2019 in Chicago, Illinois. Two days later it was reported, whilst a potential Usyk-Povetkin fight could take place in 2019, both boxers would take interim bout first.

==== Povetkin vs. Fury ====
Povetkin scored a twelve-round unanimous decision against Hughie Fury on 31 August 2019 at The O2 Arena in London on the Vasyl Lomachenko vs. Luke Campbell undercard. All of the officials had the bout exactly the same – 117–111 for Povetkin, who turned 40 two days later.

==== Povetkin vs. Hunter ====
Povetkin faced Michael Hunter on 7 December on the undercard of Andy Ruiz Jr. vs. Anthony Joshua II built Diriyah Arena in Diriyah, Saudi Arabia. Both shared a split decision draw after twelve rounds, the first draw of each fighter's career. In the ring following the fight, Povetkin and Hunter spoke about their desire for a rematch to settle the score. The fight began at a furious pace as Hunter came out fast and rocked Povetkin multiple times in the first round. The two relatively small heavyweights traded hooks and did not hang around before jumping in close. Hunter's speed continued to trouble Povetkin in the second as he wobbled the Russian again, who stood firm and refused to wilt early on. Povetkin appeared to have somewhat weathered the storm by the third and fourth rounds as Hunter's punches had less of an effect on him and he returned fire with shots of his own. The tables turned for a moment in the fifth as Povektin rocked Hunter with a left hook. The 31-year-old staggered backwards and was seemingly kept up by the ropes, though no knockdown was given. Action died down slightly in the sixth but reignited in the seventh as both men traded in the middle of the ring and appeared to hurt one another with their respective power punches. As the bout drew deeper into the second half, the pair simply could not maintain the pace of some of their earlier exchanges and things became scrappy at times. Hunter appeared to be landing the cleaner shots, catching Povetkin as he came charging forwards before utilising his own effective aggression. By the tenth, Povetkin appeared to have expended all of his energy and in the eleventh he began to grab hold of Hunter while being repeatedly caught with right hands. Come the final session, the result seemed to be heading in the American's favour, but his lackluster efforts in the last minutes proved to cost him as the result was read out as a split decision draw: 115–113 Povetkin, 115–113 Hunter, and 114–114 draw. Hunter said post-fight: "I don't make the scores so there's nothing I can say on it. I think I've done enough, but obviously the judges didn't think so, I hope I get the chance to fight him again." Povetkin replied: "I think it was a 50/50 fight. Absolutely, I will do it again for sure."

==== Povetkin vs. Whyte ====
Povetkin was scheduled to face WBC interim heavyweight champion Dillian Whyte on 2 May 2020, however, due to the COVID-19 pandemic the date was pushed back to 22 August. Whyte, installed as the pre-fight betting favourite, started off well and controlled the fight in the first four rounds, knocking Povetkin down twice in the fourth. However, 30 seconds into the following round, Povetkin landed an uppercut which left Whyte laid flat on his back, prompting the referee to call a halt to the contest. With a knockout of the year contender, Povetkin was announced the winner of the bout by fifth-round knockout. According to official viewing figures, the fight accumulated 222,000 PPV buys on Sky Sports Box Office.

==== Povetkin vs. Whyte II ====
Povetkin's first defence of his WBC interim heavyweight title consisted of an immediate rematch against Dillian Whyte in Gibraltar. The fight had originally been scheduled to take place in November 2020, but was postponed to 27 March 2021 when Povetkin contracted COVID-19. With a mainly pro-Whyte crowd of 500 fans present at the Europa Point Sports Complex, Povetkin lost the fight by way of fourth-round technical knockout, a result that saw Whyte regain the WBC interim title at Povetkin's expense. After the fight, Russian promoter Andrey Ryabinsky said he would try to "persuade him [Povetkin] to end his career", citing concerns about the fighter's health.

=== Retirement ===
On 13 June 2021, Povetkin announced his retirement from boxing aged 41, citing lingering injuries that require treatment. He said "The years take their toll, I have all kinds of injuries that still need to be treated. The time has come for me to end my career."

== Personal life ==
Povetkin has a daughter named Arina with his ex-wife, Irina. In July 2013, Alexander married Yevgenia Merkulova in the Czech Republic. He also has a brother, Vladimir Povetkin, who fights as a professional light heavyweight. Both fighters were trained by Valery Belov. Povetkin has declared himself a Rodnover, he wears a Perun Axe necklace and has the Star of Rus tattooed on his inner left biceps.

In May 2024, Povetkin was appointed Deputy Governor of Vologda Oblast.

== Professional boxing record ==
40 fights	36 wins	3 losses
By knockout	25	2
By decision	11	1
Draws	1	

No.	Result	Record	Opponent	Type	Round, time	Date	Location	Notes
40	Loss	36–3–1	Dillian Whyte	TKO	4 (12), 2:39	27 Mar 2021	Europa Point Sports Complex, Gibraltar	Lost WBC interim heavyweight title
39	Win	36–2–1	Dillian Whyte	KO	5 (12), 0:30	22 Aug 2020	Matchroom Headquarters, Brentwood, England	Won WBC interim heavyweight title
38	Draw	35–2–1	Michael Hunter	SD	12	7 Dec 2019	Diriyah Arena, Diriyah, Saudi Arabia	
37	Win	35–2	Hughie Fury	UD	12	31 Aug 2019	The O2 Arena, London, England	Won vacant WBA International heavyweight title
36	Loss	34–2	Anthony Joshua	TKO	7 (12), 1:59	22 Sep 2018	Wembley Stadium, London, England	For WBA (Super), IBF, WBO, and IBO heavyweight titles
35	Win	34–1	David Price	TKO	5 (12), 1:02	31 Mar 2018	Principality Stadium, Cardiff, Wales	Retained WBA Inter-Continental and WBO International heavyweight titles
34	Win	33–1	Christian Hammer	UD	12	15 Dec 2017	Palace of Sporting Games, Yekaterinburg, Russia	Retained WBO International heavyweight title; Won vacant WBA Inter-Continental heavyweight title
33	Win	32–1	Andriy Rudenko	UD	12	1 Jul 2017	Luzhniki Palace of Sports, Moscow, Russia	Won vacant WBA Continental (Europe) and WBO International heavyweight titles
32	Win	31–1	Johann Duhaupas	KO	6 (10), 2:59	17 Dec 2016	IEC Expo, Yekaterinburg, Russia	
31	Win	30–1	Mariusz Wach	TKO	12 (12) 0:50	4 Nov 2015	TatNeft Arena, Kazan, Russia	Retained WBC Silver heavyweight title
30	Win	29–1	Mike Perez	TKO	1 (12), 1:31	22 May 2015	Luzhniki Palace of Sports, Moscow, Russia	Retained WBC Silver heavyweight title
29	Win	28–1	Carlos Takam	KO	10 (12), 0:54	24 Oct 2014	Luzhniki Palace of Sports, Moscow, Russia	Won WBC Silver heavyweight title
28	Win	27–1	Mahmoud Charr	KO	7 (12), 1:09	30 May 2014	Luzhniki Palace of Sports, Moscow, Russia	Won WBC International heavyweight title
27	Loss	26–1	Wladimir Klitschko	UD	12	5 Oct 2013	Olympic Indoor Arena, Moscow, Russia	For WBA (Super), IBF, WBO, IBO, and The Ring heavyweight titles
26	Win	26–0	Andrzej Wawrzyk	TKO	3 (12), 2:28	17 May 2013	Crocus City Hall, Krasnogorsk, Russia	Retained WBA (Regular) heavyweight title
25	Win	25–0	Hasim Rahman	TKO	2 (12), 1:46	29 Sep 2012	Alsterdorfer Sporthalle, Hamburg, Germany	Retained WBA (Regular) heavyweight title
24	Win	24–0	Marco Huck	MD	12	25 Feb 2012	Porsche-Arena, Stuttgart, Germany	Retained WBA (Regular) heavyweight title
23	Win	23–0	Cedric Boswell	KO	8 (12), 2:58	3 Dec 2011	Hartwall Arena, Helsinki, Finland	Retained WBA (Regular) heavyweight title
22	Win	22–0	Ruslan Chagaev	UD	12	27 Aug 2011	Messe, Erfurt, Germany	Won inaugural WBA (Regular) heavyweight title
21	Win	21–0	Nicolai Firtha	UD	10	18 Dec 2010	Max-Schmeling-Halle, Berlin, Germany	
20	Win	20–0	Teke Oruh	KO	5 (10), 2:57	16 Oct 2010	Olimpyskiy Sports Palace, Chekhov, Russia	
19	Win	19–0	Javier Mora	TKO	5 (10), 0:50	13 Mar 2010	Max-Schmeling-Halle, Berlin, Germany	
18	Win	18–0	Leo Nolan	KO	3 (10), 2:33	5 Dec 2009	MHPArena, Ludwigsburg, Germany	
17	Win	17–0	Jason Estrada	UD	10	4 Apr 2009	Burg-Wächter Castello, Düsseldorf, Germany	
16	Win	16–0	Taurus Sykes	KO	4 (10), 1:43	19 Jul 2008	Olimpyskiy Sports Palace, Chekhov, Russia	
15	Win	15–0	Eddie Chambers	UD	12	26 Jan 2008	Tempodrom, Berlin, Germany	
14	Win	14–0	Chris Byrd	TKO	11 (12), 1:52	27 Oct 2007	Messe, Erfurt, Germany	
13	Win	13–0	Larry Donald	UD	10	30 Jun 2007	Olympic Indoor Arena, Moscow, Russia	
12	Win	12–0	Patrice L'Heureux	KO	2 (10), 1:02	26 May 2007	Jako Arena, Bamberg, Germany	
11	Win	11–0	David Bostice	TKO	2 (10), 2:57	3 Mar 2007	StadtHalle, Rostock, Germany	
10	Win	10–0	Imamu Mayfield	TKO	3 (10), 0:57	10 Dec 2006	Olympic Indoor Arena, Moscow, Russia	
9	Win	9–0	Ed Mahone	TKO	5 (8), 2:05	23 Sep 2006	Rittal Arena, Wetzlar, Germany	
8	Win	8–0	Livin Castillo	TKO	4 (8), 2:45	3 Jun 2006	TUI Arena, Hanover, Germany	
7	Win	7–0	Friday Ahunanya	UD	6	22 Apr 2006	SAP Arena, Mannheim, Germany	
6	Win	6–0	Richard Bango	KO	2 (6), 2:20	4 Mar 2006	EWE Arena, Oldenburg, Germany	
5	Win	5–0	Willie Chapman	TKO	5 (6), 2:21	17 Dec 2005	Max-Schmeling-Halle, Berlin, Germany	
4	Win	4–0	Stephane Tessier	UD	4	12 Nov 2005	Alsterdorfer Sporthalle, Hamburg, Germany	
3	Win	3–0	John Castle	RTD	1 (4), 3:00	1 Oct 2005	EWE Arena, Oldenburg, Germany	
2	Win	2–0	Cerrone Fox	TKO	4 (4), 2:37	3 Sep 2005	Internationales Congress Centrum, Berlin, Germany	
1	Win	1–0	Muhammad Ali Durmaz	TKO	2 (4), 1:23	11 Jun 2005	BigBox, Kempten, Germany	

== Titles in boxing ==
=== Secondary major world titles (Note: The secondary champion lineage lists the Regular or Unified champions while the primary champion is occupied.) ===
- WBA (Regular) heavyweight champion (Note: Inaugural "Regular" champion; Reigned as secondary champion from August 27, 2011 – October 5, 2013, but was never considered the primary champion.) (200+ lbs)

=== Interim/Silver world titles (Note: In 2010, the WBC created the "Silver Championship", intended as a replacement for interim titles.) ===
- WBC interim heavyweight champion (200+ lbs)
- WBC Silver heavyweight champion (200+ lbs)

=== Regional/International titles ===
- WBA International heavyweight champion (200+ lbs)
- WBA Inter-Continental heavyweight champion (200+ lbs)
- WBA Continental heavyweight champion (200+ lbs)
- WBC International heavyweight champion (200+ lbs)
- WBO International heavyweight champion (200+ lbs)

=== Honorary titles ===
- WBC Diamond heavyweight champion

== Viewership ==
=== Germany ===
Date	Fight	Viewership (avg.)	Network	Source(s)
27 October 2007	Alexander Povetkin vs. Chris Byrd	4,570,000	Das Erste	
26 January 2008	Alexander Povetkin vs. Eddie Chambers	4,880,000	Das Erste	
4 April 2009	Alexander Povetkin vs. Jason Estrada	3,700,000	Das Erste	
27 August 2011	Alexander Povetkin vs. Ruslan Chagaev	3,350,000	Das Erste	
3 December 2011	Alexander Povetkin vs. Cedric Boswell	2,120,000	Das Erste	
25 February 2012	Alexander Povetkin vs. Marco Huck	6,300,000	Das Erste	
29 September 2012	Alexander Povetkin vs. Hasim Rahman	2,570,000	Das Erste	
5 October 2013	Wladimir Klitschko vs. Alexander Povetkin	11,020,000	RTL Television	
	Total viewership	28,510,000		

=== United States ===
Date	Fight	Viewership (avg.)	Network	Source(s)
26 January 2008	Alexander Povetkin vs. Eddie Chambers	1,500,000	HBO	
7 October 2013	Wladimir Klitschko vs. Alexander Povetkin	1,239,000	HBO	
	Total viewership	2,739,000	HBO	

=== Russia ===
Date	Fight	Viewership (est.)	Network	Source(s)
7 October 2013	Wladimir Klitschko vs. Alexander Povetkin	23,000,000	1 Kanal	
	Total viewership	23,000,000	1 Kanal	

=== Ukraine ===
Date	Fight	Viewership (est.)	Network	Source(s)
7 October 2013	Wladimir Klitschko vs. Alexander Povetkin	23,000,000	Inter	
	Total viewership	23,000,000	Inter	

=== UK pay-per-view bouts ===
Date	Fight	Pay-per-view buys	Network	Source(s)
22 September 2018	Anthony Joshua vs. Alexander Povetkin	1,247,000	Sky Box Office	
22 August 2020	Dillian Whyte vs. Alexander Povetkin	337,000	Sky Box Office	
27 March 2021	Alexander Povetkin vs. Dillian Whyte II	197,000	Sky Box Office	
	Total sales	1,781,000		

== See also ==
- List of world heavyweight boxing champions
- List of WBA world champions
- List of Olympics medalists in boxing
- Boxing at the 2004 Summer Olympics

== Notes ==
Sporting positions
Regional boxing titles
Vacant Title last held by Tony Thompson	WBC International heavyweight champion 30 May 2014 – October 2014; Vacated	Vacant Title next held by Anthony Joshua
Preceded by Carlos Takam	WBC Silver heavyweight champion 24 October 2014 – April 2016; Vacated	Vacant Title next held by Johann Duhaupas
Vacant Title last held by Otto Wallin	WBA Continental (Europe) heavyweight champion 1 July 2017 – 15 December 2017; Won Inter-Continental title	Vacant Title next held by Joe Joyce
Vacant Title last held by Tyson Fury	WBO International heavyweight champion 1 July 2017 – July 2018; Vacated	Vacant Title next held by Dillian Whyte
Vacant Title last held by Kubrat Pulev	WBA Inter-Continental heavyweight champion 15 December 2017 – September 2018; Vacated	Vacant Title next held by Sergei Kuzmin
Vacant Title last held by Michael Hunter	WBA International heavyweight champion 31 August 2019 – December 2019; Vacated	Vacant Title next held by Zhan Kossobutskiy
World boxing titles
New title	WBA heavyweight champion Regular title 27 August 2011 – 5 October 2013; Failed to win Super title	Vacant Title next held by Ruslan Chagaev
Preceded by Dillian Whyte	WBC heavyweight champion Interim title 22 August 2020 – 27 March 2021	Succeeded by Dillian Whyte
