= Wladimir Klitschko vs. Alexander Povetkin =

Boxing competition

- Date: 5 October 2013
- Venue: Olimpiyskiy, Moscow, Russia
- Titles on the line: WBA, IBF, WBO, IBO, and The Ring heavyweight titles

Tale of the tape
| Boxer | Wladimir Klitschko | Alexander Povetkin |
| Nickname | Dr. Steelhammer | Sasha |
| Hometown | Kyiv, Ukraine | Kursk, Russia |
| Purse | $17,499,997 | $5,833,333 |
| Pre-fight record | 60–3 (52 KO) | 26–0 (18 KO) |
| Age | 37 years, 6 months | 34 years, 1 month |
| Height | 6 ft 6 in (198 cm) | 6 ft 2 in (188 cm) |
| Weight | 241 3/4 lb (110 kg) | 225 3/4 lb (102 kg) |
| Style | Orthodox | Orthodox |
| Recognition | WBA, IBF, WBO, The Ring and IBO; Heavyweight Champion; TBRB; No. 1 Ranked Heavyweight | WBA "Regular"; Heavyweight Champion; The Ring; No. 1 Ranked Heavyweight; WBO/TBRB; No. 3 Ranked Heavyweight |

Result
- Klitschko wins via 12-round unanimous decision (119–104, 119–104, 119–104)

Wladimir Klitschko vs. Alexander Povetkin, was a professional boxing match contested on 5 October 2013 for the WBA, IBF, WBO, The Ring and IBO heavyweight championship.

== Background ==
At the end of 2012, the WBA ordered unified heavyweight champion Wladimir Klitschko to fight its "Regular" beltholder Alexander Povetkin no later than 24 February 2013, but the two sides failed reach an agreement. Klitschko was permitted a voluntary title defence in the meantime. After stopping WBO 7th ranked heavyweight (WBA 12th) Francesco Pianeta in May, it was agreed that Klitschko and Povetkin would meet in October.

They had been originally scheduled to face off in December 2008 as an IBF mandatory defence, however an ankle injury for Povetkin saw him be replaced by Hasim Rahman. They were again set fight in September 2010, however Povetkin withdrew obstinately with a sinus problem.

== The fight ==
Klitschko dominated the bout, scoring a knockdown in round two from a quick left hook, and three knockdowns in round seven, including one from a straight right hand. All three judges scored it 119–104 on the scorecards. Klitschko landed 139 of 417 punches (33%) and Povetkin connected on 59 of 283 (21%).

== Aftermath ==
This bout is one of only two occasions where the WBA "Regular" heavyweight champion has challenged the "Super" champion, the other being when Oleksandr Usyk knocked out Daniel Dubois in August 2023.

Povetkin would have one more shot at a world title against Anthony Joshua in September 2018.

== Undercard ==
Confirmed bouts:

== Broadcasting ==
With 9.2 rating, the fight became the most popular sporting event on Russian television in 2013, as well as the most watched TV program of the year in Moscow with a 13.9 rating, surpassing the Moscow Victory Day Parade. Overall, the fight was watched by 23 million people in Russia.

In Ukraine, the fight averaged 11 million viewers and was watched by a total 23 million people on Inter. It was the most-watched television broadcast of the year in the 18+ demographic with a 19.5 rating (55.7 share).

In Germany, the fight averaged 11.02 million viewers on RTL Television (35.4 share). It was the most-watched television program on the network in 2013.

| Country | Broadcaster |
|---|---|
| Australia | Main Event |
| China | CCTV-5 |
| Croatia | Nova TV |
| Czech Republic | Fanda |
| Denmark | TV3+ |
| Estonia | Viasat Sport Baltic |
| Germany | RTL |
| Hungary | Sport 1 |
| Japan | WOWOW Prime |
| Latvia | Viasat Sport Baltic |
| Lithuania | Viasat Sport Baltic |
| Netherlands | RTL 7 |
| Poland | Polsat Sport |
| Russia | 1 Kanal |
| Slovakia | Dajto |
| Ukraine | Inter |
| United Kingdom | Box Nation |
| United States | HBO |

| Preceded by vs. Francesco Pianeta | Wladimir Klitschko's bouts 5 October 2013 | Succeeded by vs. Alex Leapai |
| Preceded by vs. Andrzej Wawrzyk | Alexander Povetkin's bouts 5 October 2013 | Succeeded by vs. Manuel Charr |
