= Andrey Ryabinskiy =

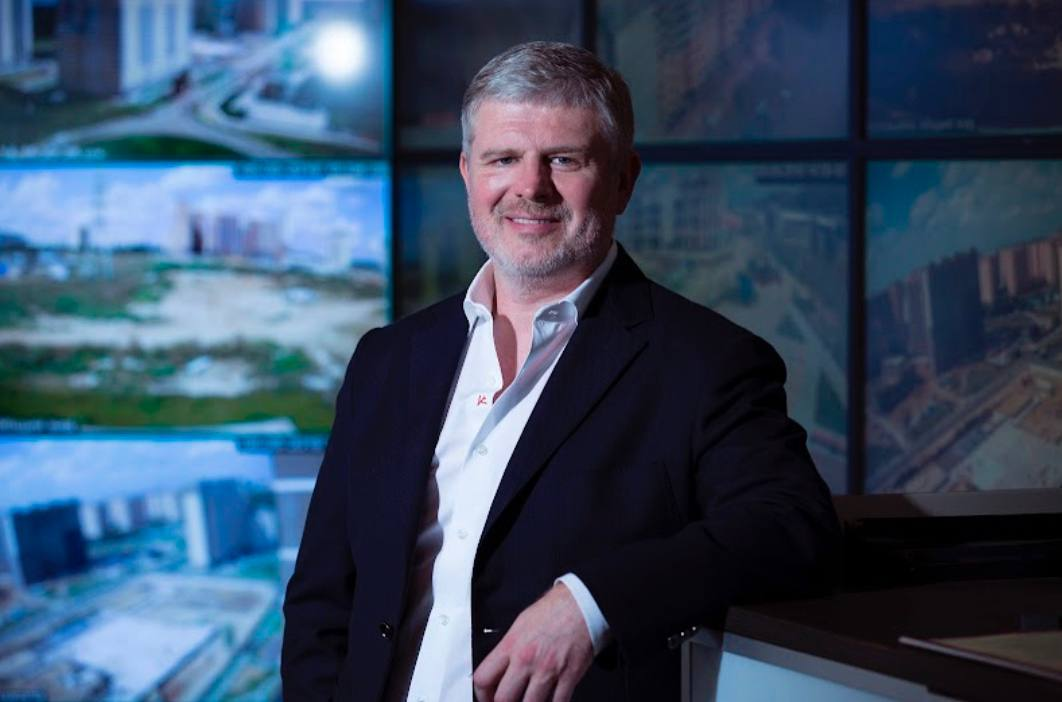
- Born: July 17, 1973 (age 53); USSR
- Occupations: Businessman, boxing promoter

Andrey Mikhailovich Ryabinskiy (born July 17, 1973, Moscow, USSR) is a Russian entrepreneur, founder and chairman of the board of directors of LLC Moskovsky Ipotechny Centr Group. He is president of the promotional company World of Boxing.

== Biography ==
As a student, Andrey started working in a major Moscow real estate company. There, he met Aleksandr Kopylkov, and in 1999 they founded MIC Group together. Having initially focused exclusively on real-estate work, the company began investing in housing construction and related sectors, and from 2005 began building housing independently. In 2012, Andrey became chairman of the board of directors of MIC Group, which is one of the top 3 property developers in "New Moscow" and Moscow Region and took 12th place in RBC magazine's TOP 30 ranking of Russia's biggest property developers in 2013.

In 2014, the successful activity of the company was noted in the rating of 30 largest developers of the country according to the version of the monthly business magazine RBC

In May 2015, the MIC Group of Companies is in the rating scale of the largest developers of Russia prepared by the INFOLINE information agency based on indicators reflecting the input volume of residential real estate in 2014. In October 2015, the MIC group of companies took the 6th place in the rating of the largest Russian developers compiled by the RAEX agency (the list of leaders was collected information on more than 100 of the largest federal and regional construction of the companies). In December 2015, experts from the National Association of Housing Developers (NAZD) compiled a list of the 200 largest developers in Russia.

In 2016, the MIC group of companies ranked first among the largest and most reliable developers of the Moscow region, according to the Ministry of Construction of the city of Moscow.

On October 13, 2017, the annual ceremony of presenting the national award for achievements in housing construction RREF AWARDS was held in “Izvestia Hall”. The MIC group of companies being the part of pool of the strongest players in the residential real estate market of the Moscow region, won in the group of nominations “Professional recognition” (“Reputation and trust” for companies). Since 2017, the MIC Group of Companies became the Platinum Partner of Sberbank of Russia.

On October 12, 2018, the annual RREF AWARDS Award in the field of residential real estate took place in Moscow.

Since July 1, 2019, the developer has no effect on the money that he receives from citizens, they are on escrow accounts, and the developer only builds and at the end fixes the profit that he can take.

Since 2011 MIC group is a partner of the charity fund to help children with oncohematological and other serious diseases "Give Life".

In 2019, the company's real estate projects held leading positions numerous times in New Moscow Most Demanded New Buildings rankings, whereas the company itself was listed in Moscow Region's top ten best and largest developing companies.

In 2019, Forbes listed MIC number 14 among Russia's most reliable construction and development companies. MIC is also listed among Russia's top 500 companies as measured by revenue.

In June 2019, MIC became the first Russian development and construction company to switch to using escrow accounts in all of its real estate sales.

== Sports projects ==
In 2012 and 2013, he was a General Partner of Khimki Basketball Club.

On October 5, 2013, Andrey Ryabinskiy together with Rosneft organized a boxing match between Vladimir Klichko and Alexander Povetkin under the auspices of WBA, WBO, IBF and IBO. The budget for the Klichko vs. Povetkin fight was US$25 million and the television rights were sold worldwide to broadcasters including RTL, HBO and Russia's Channel One. According to Ryabinskiy, it was not a commercial project for him: “I understand that when compared to the earnings, whatever I do I’m throwing my money down the drain by organizing this fight. But I just wanted to organize a world-class fight". Ryabinskiy also noted that he wants to hep Moscow become an international boxing center like New York, Las Vegas and Hamburg.

In 2013, Andrey created and headed up the promotionalcompany World of Boxing, which became part of MIC Group. The center has signed contracts with leading boxers including Alexander Povetkin, Denis Lebedev, Grigory Drozd, Rakhim Chakhkiev, Eduard Troyanovsky and Manuel Charr to become Europe's biggest boxing promoter.

In 2014, the World of Boxing promotional company organized a number of major championship fights. In 2015, Ryabinskiy won a court case against the legendary boxing promoter Don King, who was responsible for the cancellation of а fight between WBA world champion Denis Lebedev and Guillermo Jones. Ryabinskiy promised to invest the US$1.6 mln compensation payout in "training Russian boxers". In 2018, Ryabinskiy won US$4.3 mln in a dispute over the fight between Alexander Povetkin and Deontay Wilder, which was cancelled in 2016.

In June 2021, Andrei Ryabinsky, being the promoter of boxer Alexander Povetkin, announced the end of his sports career.

== Achievements and awards ==
In 2011, was a prizewinner in the Persona No.1 category of the annual international Real Estate Market Records awards.

In 2012, placed 360th in Kommersant's Top 1000 Regional Enterprise Managers ranking as chairman of the board of MIC Group.

In July 2013, placed 5th in Medialogiya's TOP 10 Businessmenranking after organizing the Klichko vs. Povetkin fight.

In 2014, was named Man of the Year by the World Boxing Council (WBC).

In 2014, won the Russian Boxing Star award in the Man of the Year category.

In 2016, set a world sniper record in the "Group of Five Shots in a Row" discipline. In 2017, set a world sniper record in precision at long distance – 4,210 m.

In 2018, took 5th place in an international tournament of sniper teams from special forces and 2nd place in the F-OPEN category of the F-class discipline at the Russian High-Precision Shooting Open.

At the end of 2018, the MIC group and Andrey Ryabinsky himself were awarded a letter of thanks from the mayor of Moscow. In the text of the letter, the mayor thanked Andrei Mikhailovich “for his active participation in the public life of the capital and his great personal contribution to the urban development of Moscow.

In 2019, Andrey Ryabinsky came third in the individual competition, and first in the team competition in the first King Of Two Miles all-Russian ultra-long-range shooting tournament. He also took the second prize in the Russian Open high-precision long-distance shooting championship in the F-Class discipline.

In 2020, he took 1st place at the Russian Open High-Precision Shooting Championship. Previously, he also took part in the Russian Open F-class Championship, where he took 3rd place in the F OPEN class with a score of 235 points.

In June, the shooter won the national record for 900 yards, 15 shots in the F OPEN class, with a score of 75.11. The record was set on June 20, 2020 at the first stage of the Russian Championship in Belgorod.

In October 2020, he took part in the King 2 Miles high-precision shooting competition, where he took 1st place.

In 2021, he took 1st place in the team competition at the Open Championship in High-precision Shooting in Belgorod.

In June 2021, for the second time, he became the winner of the extremely long distance sniper pair competition and received the award "King of 1 Mile" and «King of 2 Miles».
