= Erkan Teper =

German boxer

Personal information
- Nationality: German
- Born: 18 June 1982 (age 44) Ahlen, North Rhine-Westphalia, West Germany
- Height: 1.95 m (6 ft 5 in)
- Weight: Heavyweight

Boxing career
- Stance: Orthodox

Boxing record
- Total fights: 26
- Wins: 21 (Note: Sources vary: Teper's win against David Price was changed to a no contest by the Bund Deutscher Berufsboxer (BDB; Association of German Professional Boxers), giving Teper 20 official wins. The EBU, who sanctioned the fight, maintain the original result as valid, along with BoxRec, giving Teper 21 official wins.)
- Win by KO: 13
- Losses: 4
- Draws: 1

Erkan Teper (born 18 June 1982) is a German professional boxer. He held the European heavyweight title in 2015, but was stripped by the EBU for failing a drug test.

== Amateur career ==
As a super heavyweight amateur, Teper won silver medals at the 2006 German National Championships and the 2007 World Military Games. He won the 2009 Bolivarian Alternative Games in Santiago, Cuba.

== Professional career ==
=== Teper vs. Price and Doping Violation ===
Teper faced heavyweight contender David Price on 17 July 2015 for the EBU heavyweight title. He fought belligerently during the bout and knocked down Price in the 2nd round with a left hook. The fight was called off by the referee immediately resulting in a KO victory for Teper.

Teper was supposed to face Robert Helenius on 19 December 2015, but cancelled the match due to a shoulder injury. Thus he had to give up the EBU Heavyweight title, which was then claimed by Helenius in a match against Franz Rill. It was later reported that Teper had failed a post-fight drug test after knocking out Price. Teper was subsequently banned and the result changed to a No contest by the Bund Deutscher Berufsboxer (BDB). However, Boxrec.com maintains that the record was not changed to a No contest: "The EBU maintains that it was supervising the contest and as such EBU rules must be applied, therefore keeping the result of Teper WTKO 2 / 12 but stripping the title."

== Professional boxing record ==
26 fights	21 wins	4 losses
By knockout	13	2
By decision	8	2
Draws	1	

No.	Result	Record	Opponent	Type	Round, time	Date	Location	Notes
26	Draw	21–4–1	Djuar El Scheich	PTS	6	21 Oct 2023	Fit and Fight, Euskirchen, Germany	
25	Loss	21–4	Arslanbek Makhmudov	RTD	1 (10), 3:00	23 Sep 2021	Centre Videotron, Quebec City, Quebec, Canada	For WBC-NABF and WBA-NABA heavyweight titles
24	Win	21–3	Mykyta Nesterenko	UD	4	8 Feb 2020	EWS Arena, Goeppingen, Germany	
23	Win	20–3	Samir Barakovic	TKO	3 (8), 1:30	22 Jun 2019	Argensporthalle, Wangen im Allgaeu, Germany	
22	Loss	19–3	Robert Helenius	KO	8 (12), 3:00	29 Sep 2018	Ritter-Sport-Stadion, Waldenbuch, Germany	For vacant IBF Inter-Continental heavyweight title
21	Win	19–2	Davit Gorgiladze	TKO	2 (6)	28 Apr 2018	Stadthalle, Cloppenburg, Germany	
20	Win	18–2	Evgenios Lazaridis	PTS	10	24 Oct 2017	Sporthalle, Leinfelden-Echterdingen, Germany	
19	Win	17–2	Zoltan Csala	TKO	1 (8), 2:46	21 Jul 2017	Große Sporthalle, Schwäbisch Gmünd, Germany	
18	Loss	16–2	Mariusz Wach	UD	12	18 Mar 2017	Arena Leipzig, Leipzig, Germany	For vacant IBF East/West Europe heavyweight title
17	Loss	16–1	Christian Hammer	SD	12	15 Oct 2016	Hamburg, Germany	For vacant WBO European heavyweight title
16	Win	16–0	Derric Rossy	UD	10	3 Jul 2016	Gellersenhalle, Lüneburg, Germany	
15	Win	15–0	David Price	KO	2 (12), 0:52	17 Jul 2015	MHPArena, Ludwigsburg, Germany	Vacant European heavyweight title at stake; Although the BDB overturned the result after Teper failed a drug test, the EBU ultimately upheld Teper's victory
14	Win	14–0	Johann Duhaupas	UD	12	14 Mar 2015	Alte Reithalle, Stuttgart, Germany	Won vacant IBF Inter-Continental heavyweight title
13	Win	13–0	Newfel Ouatah	RTD	6 (12), 3:00	13 Jun 2014	Bavaria Filmstadt, Munich, Germany	Won vacant European Union heavyweight title
12	Win	12–0	Martin Rogan	KO	1 (10), 1:25	16 Nov 2013	MHPArena, Ludwigsburg, Germany	
11	Win	11–0	Michael Sprott	TKO	1 (10), 2:41	31 Aug 2013	Münsterplatz, Basel, Switzerland	
10	Win	10–0	Timur Stark	SD	8	13 Apr 2013	Multiversum, Schwechat, Austria	
9	Win	9–0	Gbenga Oloukun	UD	8	14 Oct 2012	SKC TaBeA Halle, Halle, Germany	
8	Win	8–0	Ivica Perkovic	RTD	4 (10), 3:00	9 Mar 2012	Atatürk Spor Salonu, Tekirdağ, Turkey	
7	Win	7–0	Cisse Salif	TKO	2 (8), 2:54	26 Nov 2011	Spor Salonu, Trabzon, Turkey	
6	Win	6–0	Jakov Gospic	KO	9 (12), 2:59	15 Jul 2011	EWS Arena, Göppingen, Germany	Won vacant WBC Mediterranean heavyweight title
5	Win	5–0	Robert Hawkins	PTS	6	1 Apr 2011	Pferdesportpark, Berlin, Germany	
4	Win	4–0	Sandor Balogh	PTS	6	25 Feb 2011	Hotel Park, Novi Sad, Serbia	
3	Win	3–0	Donato DeMartiis	TKO	1 (4), 1:49	17 Dec 2010	American Airlines Arena, Miami, Florida, US	
2	Win	2–0	Alexander Kahl	KO	1 (4), 0:36	12 Nov 2010	HanseDom, Stralsund, Germany	
1	Win	1–0	Marcel Zeller	TKO	3 (4)	4 Sep 2010	Lanxess Arena, Cologne, Germany	

== Notes ==
Sporting positions
Regional boxing titles
Vacant Title last held by Johann Duhaupas	WBC Mediterranean heavyweight champion 15 July 2011 – December 2012; Vacated	Vacant Title next held by Manuel Charr
Vacant Title last held by Johann Duhaupas	European Union heavyweight champion 13 June 2014 – 17 July 2015; Won European title	Vacant Title next held by Agit Kabayel
Vacant Title last held by Odlanier Solis	IBF Inter-Continental heavyweight champion 14 March 2015 – July 2015; Vacated	Vacant Title next held by Éric Molina
Vacant Title last held by Tyson Fury	European heavyweight champion 17 July 2015 – 19 December 2015; Stripped; Ruled an NC by the German Boxing Commission; result maintained by the EBU	Vacant Title next held by Robert Helenius
