= Zhan Kossobutskiy =

Kazakh boxer (born 1988)

Zhan Kossobutskiy Жан Кособуцкий
Personal information
- Nationality: Kazakh
- Born: Zhan Sergeevich Kosobutsky; 13 November 1988 (age 37) Arkalyk, Kazakh SSR, Soviet Union
- Height: 6 ft 3 in (191 cm)
- Weight: Heavyweight

Boxing career
- Reach: 78 in (198 cm)
- Stance: Southpaw

Boxing record
- Total fights: 20
- Wins: 19
- Win by KO: 18
- Losses: 1
Medal record
Summer Universiade
Silver medal – second place	2013 Kazan	Super Heavyweight

Zhan Sergeevich Kossobutskiy (Cyrillic: Жан Сергеевич Кособуцкий; born 13 November 1988) is a Kazakh professional boxer who has held the WBC International heavyweight title since May 2022.

== Professional boxing career ==
Kossobutskiy made his professional debut against Edgars Kalnars on 23 September 2017, and won by a first-round technical knockout. He amassed an 11-0 record during the next two years, winning all but one of the fights by stoppage.

Kossobutskiy faced Agron Smakici for the vacant IBO Inter-Continental heavyweight title on 11 November 2019. He won the fight by knockout, stopping the Croatian cruiserweight with just 20 seconds left in the first round. Kossobutskiy Abraham Tabul in a non-title bout on 6 March 2020. He won the fight by a second-round technical knockout. Kossobutskiy next faced Kamil Sokolowski on 4 August 2020, in his final fight of the year. He won the fight by knockout, stopping Sokolowski midway through the tenth and last round of the bout.

Kossobutskiy was expected to face Pavel Sour for the vacant WBA International heavyweight title on 20 February 2021, at the Universum Gym in Hamburg, Germany. Sour was forced to withdraw from the title fight after testing positive COVID-19 and was replaced by Onoriode Ehwarieme. Kossobutskiy knocked Ehwarieme down once in the third round, before finishing him in the fourth. After capturing the WBA secondary title, Kossobutskiy signed a promotional deal with Frank Warren.

Kossobutskiy made his first title defense against Joey Dawejko on 21 August 2021, at the same venue and location in which he had won the secondary WBA belt. The bout was broadcast domestically in Germany by BILD+ and internationally as a FITE TV pay-per-view. Kossobutskiy won the fight by a second-round left hook knockout. Dawejko later claimed the finishing shot had landed to the back of his head, although the referee didn't seem to agree with him.

Kossobutskiy faced former WBC world title challenger Johann Duhaupas for the vacant WBC International heavyweight title on 21 May 2022. He won the fight by a fifth-round stoppage, as Duhaupas retired from the bout before the start of the sixth round. On Aug 26 2023 Kossobuskiy fought Efe Ajagba. He disgracefully hit Ajagba low and was DQ from the fight in the fourth round.

3 Days after the fight Kossobutskiy would say that “After receiving numerous low-blow-shots by my opponent, I got out of control, lost my professionalism and tried to do vigilantism.” Kossobutskiy has not returned since.

== Professional boxing record ==
20 fights	19 wins	1 loss
By knockout	18	0
By decision	1	0
By disqualification	0	1

No.	Result	Record	Opponent	Type	Round, time	Date	Location	Notes
20	Loss	19–1	Efe Ajagba	DQ	4 (10), 0:33	26 Aug 2023	Hard Rock Hotel & Casino, Tulsa, Oklahoma, U.S.	
19	Win	19–0	Hussein Muhamed	KO	3 (10), 1:35	5 Nov 2022	Rudolf Weber-Arena, Oberhausen, Germany	Retained WBC International heavyweight title
18	Win	18–0	Johann Duhaupas	RTD	5 (10), 3:00	21 May 2022	Inselparkhalle, Wilhelmsburg, Germany	Won vacant WBC International heavyweight title
17	Win	17–0	Alexis Garcia	TKO	5 (10), 0:50	19 Feb 2022	Universum Gym, Hamburg, Germany	Won vacant WBC International Silver heavyweight title
16	Win	16–0	Joey Dawejko	KO	2 (12), 2:07	21 Aug 2021	Universum Gym, Hamburg, Germany	Retained WBA International heavyweight title
15	Win	15–0	Onoriode Ehwarieme	KO	4 (12), 1:13	20 Feb 2021	Universum Gym, Hamburg, Germany	Won vacant WBA International heavyweight title
14	Win	14–0	Kamil Sokolowski	KO	10 (10), 1:46	4 Aug 2020	DiaMond, Minsk, Belarus	
13	Win	13–0	Abraham Tabul	TKO	2 (8), 1:30	6 Mar 2020	Caesars Palace, Bluewaters Island, Dubai, UAE	
12	Win	12–0	Agron Smakici	KO	1 (10), 2:40	11 Nov 2019	Kuppel, Hamburg, Germany	Won vacant IBO Inter-Continental heavyweight title
11	Win	11–0	Osborn Machimana	KO	1 (6), 2:59	16 Oct 2019	Korston Club, Moscow, Russia	
10	Win	10–0	Williams Ocando	TKO	2 (6), 1:20	24 Apr 2019	Zhuravinka Club, Minsk, Belarus	
9	Win	9–0	Srdan Govedarica	TKO	1 (6), 2:34	29 Jan 2019	Astoriya Riverside Club, Minsk, Belarus	
8	Win	8–0	Aliaksandr Niakhaichyk	TKO	2 (6), 1:17	29 Nov 2018	Zhuravinka Club, Minsk, Belarus	
7	Win	7–0	Kostiantyn Dovbyshchenko	PTS	6	27 Sep 2018	Crazy Horse Club, Minsk, Belarus	
6	Win	6–0	Irakli Gvenetadze	RTD	1 (6), 3:00	17 Jun 2018	Parkovy Convention Centre, Kyiv, Ukraine	
5	Win	5–0	Gogita Gorgiladze	TKO	2 (6), 0:13	25 May 2018	Prime Hall, Minsk, Belarus	
4	Win	4–0	Maksym Pedyura	TKO	1 (8), 1:50	22 Feb 2018	Crazy Horse Club, Minsk, Belarus	
3	Win	3–0	Oleksandr Nesterenko	KO	1 (8), 2:02	21 Dec 2017	USC Soviet Wings, Moscow, Russia	
2	Win	2–0	Aleh Zablotski	TKO	4 (6), 1:44	21 Nov 2017	Zhuravinka Club, Minsk, Belarus	
1	Win	1–0	Edgars Kalnars	TKO	1 (4), 2:42	23 Sep 2017	Palace of Culture, Barysaw, Belarus	
