= MIC (organization) =

Russian construction company group

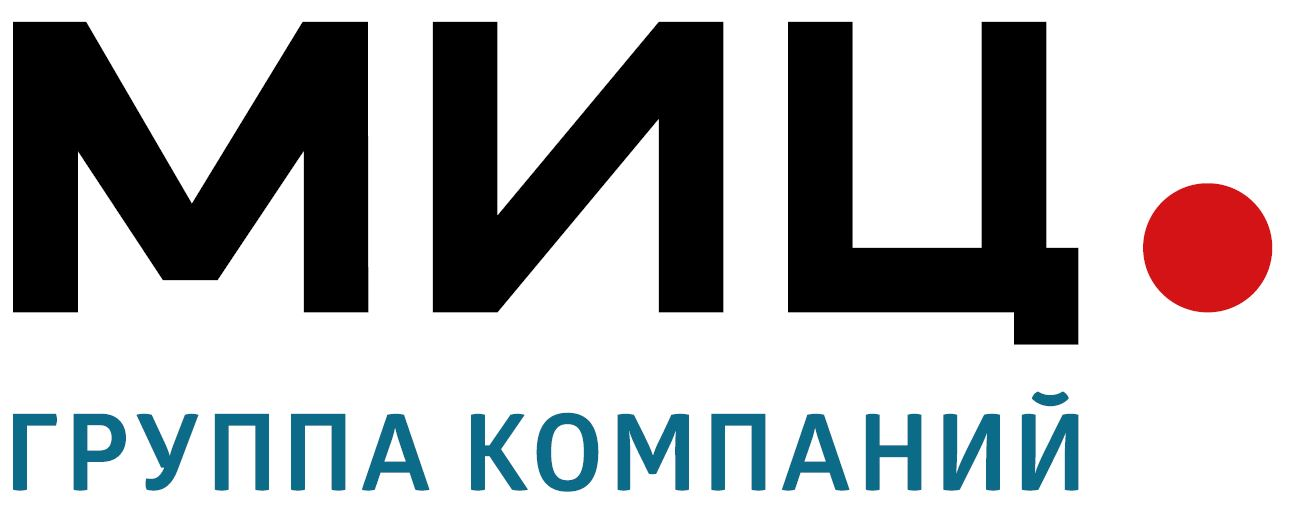
- Industry: Development; Construction
- Founded: 1999
- Headquarters: Moscow, Russia
- Key people: Andrey Ryabinskiy (chair of the board of directors)
- Website: www.gk-mic.ru

MIC Group is a Moscow-based construction organization comprising property development, construction and real estate companies.

It specializes mainly in housing construction.

== History ==
Founded in 1999 as a real estate company, "Moskovskiy Ipotechny Centr – MIC" moved into the investment and property development sector in 2001. This was when it became a co-investor in a number of Moscow housing projects.

In 2000, MIC Group had a turnover of 1.1 bn rubles, which increased to 1.6 bn rubles in 2007, 20 bn rubles in 2012, and 49 bn rubles in 2014. Its debt burden is 1.5–2 bn rubles.

In 2013, RBC Rating named MIC as the second biggest property developer in Russia by construction volume.

In 2017, MIC Group announced plans to invest 28 bn rubles in the construction of over 700,000 sq m of housing in "New Moscow".

In 2019, MIC was ranked 14th in the rating of the most reliable Russian developers according to Forbes. He was also included in the rating of the 500 largest companies in Russia in terms of revenue, according to RBC.

In July 2019, MIC became the first development company to completely switch to sales using escrow accounts.

In 2020, LLC "GC" MIC "was included in the updated list of systemically important companies, approved by the government as part of measures to support the economy due to the coronavirus pandemic.
