= Johann Duhaupas =

French boxer

Personal information
- Nickname: Reptile
- Nationality: French
- Born: 5 February 1981 (age 45) Abbeville, Somme, France
- Height: 1.95 m (6 ft 5 in)
- Weight: Heavyweight

Boxing career
- Reach: 210 cm (83 in)
- Stance: Orthodox

Boxing record
- Total fights: 46
- Wins: 39
- Win by KO: 26
- Losses: 7

Johann Duhaupas (pronounced yoh-hun doo-uh-paw) (born 5 February 1981) is a French professional boxer who challenged for the WBC heavyweight title in 2015. At regional level he has held multiple heavyweight titles, including the European Union title from 2013 to 2014.

== Professional career ==
=== Early career ===
Johann Duhaupas began his pro career in 2004. In 2008, with an undefeated record of 17–0, Duhaupas faced another undefeated boxer, Italian Francesco Pianeta. He lost the fight by a unanimous decision.

On 14 March 2015 Duhaupas was defeated by the German boxer Erkan Teper by a twelve round unanimous decision. Despite the loss, Duhaupas looked very good, took Teper's best shots and gave him his hardest fight of his career.

27 days later, on 10 April 2015 Duhaupas faced the future regular WBA heavyweight champion Mahmoud Charr in Moscow, Russia and beat him by a 10 round decision.

==== Duhaupas vs. Wilder ====
Duhaupas faced hard hitting Deontay Wilder for the WBC World heavyweight title on 26 September 2015 in Birmingham, Alabama. He was outboxed, suffering severe swelling and sustaining cuts, and was stopped in the eleventh round after being hit with several unanswered blows.

==== Duhaupas vs. Helenius ====
On 2 April 2016 Duhaupas traveled to Finland to take on undefeated Robert Helenius. Duhaupas was brought in as an underdog but instead he dominated Helenius and gave him his first career loss. Duhaupas dropped him twice prior to knockout in the sixth round.

==== Duhaupas vs. Povetkin ====
On a day's notice Duhaupas took on the fight against Russian fighter Alexander Povetkin, replacing the former WBC heavyweight champion Bermane Stiverne, who pulled out of the fight after learning that Povetkin tested positive for the banned substance ostarine and that the World Boxing Council wouldn't sanction the fight. Povetkin hurt Duhaupas with two left hooks to the head in round 6 to knock him down and out. The fight was halted by the referee, as Duhaupas was badly hurt from the left hands. The official time of the stoppage was at 2:59 of the 6th round.

==== Duhaupas vs. Miller ====
Following the Povetkin loss, Duhaupas knocked out three low-level opponents in 2017. He faced undefeated American Jarrell Miller on 28 April 2018, in New York. Duhaupas lost the bout via unanimous decision 119–109, 119–109, and 117–111.

In his next fight, Duhaupas fought and defeated Luis Pascual with a second round knockout in a scheduled eight-rounder.

== Professional boxing record ==
46 fights	39 wins	7 losses
By knockout	26	4
By decision	11	3
By disqualification	2	0

No.	Result	Record	Opponent	Type	Round, time	Date	Location	Notes
46	Loss	39–7	Zhan Kossobutskiy	RTD	5 (10), 3:00	21 May 2022	Inselparkhalle, Wilhelmsburg, Germany	For vacant WBC International heavyweight title
45	Win	39–6	Andras Csomor	TKO	2 (8), 2:35	13 Nov 2021	Dudelange, Luxemburg	
44	Loss	38–6	Tony Yoka	TKO	1 (12), 2:45	25 Sep 2020	La Défense Arena, Paris, France	
43	Win	38–5	Luis Pascual	KO	2 (8), 2:17	25 Oct 2019	Marriot Hotel Cite Internationale, Lyon, France	
42	Loss	37–5	Jarrell Miller	UD	12	28 Apr 2018	Barclays Center, New York City, New York, US	
41	Win	37–4	Newfel Ouatah	RTD	8 (12), 3:00	14 Dec 2017	Palais des Sport Marcel Cerdan, Levallois-Perret, France	Won vacant WBA International heavyweight title
40	Win	36–4	Evgeny Orlov	TKO	4 (10), 1:15	16 Sep 2017	WS arena, Vaasa, Finland	
39	Win	35–4	David Gogishvili	KO	3 (8), 1:06	22 Apr 2017	Puuvilla, Pori, Finland	
38	Loss	34–4	Alexander Povetkin	KO	6 (10), 2:59	17 Dec 2016	IEC Expo, Yekaterinburg, Russia	
37	Win	34–3	Robert Helenius	KO	6 (12), 3:00	2 Apr 2016	Hartwall Arena, Helsinki, Finland	Won vacant WBC Silver heavyweight title
36	Win	33–3	Marcelo Nascimento	UD	10	5 Feb 2016	Gymnase du Lycée Technique de Monaco, Monte Carlo, Monaco	
35	Loss	32–3	Deontay Wilder	TKO	11 (12), 0:55	26 Sep 2015	Legacy Arena, Birmingham, Alabama, US	For WBC heavyweight title
34	Win	32–2	Mahmoud Charr	MD	10	10 Apr 2015	Olympic Indoor Arena, Moscow, Russia	
33	Loss	31–2	Erkan Teper	UD	12	14 Mar 2015	Alte Reithalle, Stuttgart, Germany	For vacant IBF Inter-Continental heavyweight title
32	Win	31–1	Janne Katajisto	KO	7 (12), 2:55	5 Apr 2014	Salle omnisports, Abbeville, France	Retained European Union heavyweight title
31	Win	30–1	Jarno Rosberg	KO	4 (12), 2:05	19 Oct 2013	Salle omnisports, Abbeville, France	Won vacant European Union heavyweight title
30	Win	29–1	Fabrice Aurieng	KO	4 (10), 1:37	22 Jun 2013	Salle omnisports, Abbeville, France	Won French heavyweight title
29	Win	28–1	Kotatsu Takehara	TKO	6 (8), 2:14	19 Sep 2012	Korakuen Hall, Tokyo, Japan	
28	Win	27–1	Gabor Farkas	TKO	5 (8), 2:35	10 Feb 2012	La Salle des Fêtes, Carouge, Switzerland	
27	Win	26–1	Saul Farah	TKO	2 (8), 1:30	2 Apr 2011	Arena Roberto Durán, Panama City, Panama	Won vacant WBA Fedebol heavyweight title
26	Win	25–1	Igoris Borucha	UD	6	4 Dec 2010	Salle Ibn Yassine, Rabat, Morocco	
25	Win	24–1	Paul Butlin	UD	8	6 Nov 2010	Salle bout du Monde, Geneva, Switzerland	
24	Win	23–1	Pavels Dolgovs	TKO	8 (12), 0:48	22 May 2010	Salle omnisports, Abbeville, France	Won vacant WBC Mediterranean heavyweight title
23	Win	22–1	Aleksandrs Selezens	DQ	5 (8), 2:43	9 Apr 2010	Palais des Sport Marcel Cerdan, Levallois-Perret, France	
22	Win	21–1	Ramiro Reducindo	KO	1 (12), 0:58	5 Dec 2009	Centre de sports, Abbeville, France	
21	Win	20–1	Jean Claude Bikoi	TKO	3 (6), 1:09	3 Jul 2009	Palais des Sport Marcel Cerdan, Levallois-Perret, France	
20	Win	19–1	Evgeny Orlov	UD	6	23 May 2009	Deauville Casino, Deauville, France	
19	Win	18–1	Serdar Uysal	RTD	3 (8), 3:00	28 Mar 2009	Salle Jean Mace, Issoudun, France	
18	Loss	17–1	Francesco Pianeta	UD	12	20 Dec 2008	Hallenstadion, Zürich, Switzerland	For European Union heavyweight title
17	Win	17–0	Radoslav Milutinovic	TKO	1 (6), 1:22	20 Jun 2008	Dudelange, Luxembourg	
16	Win	16–0	Stephane Tessier	UD	6	17 May 2008	Salle Albert Camus, Creil, France	
15	Win	15–0	Edgars Kalnars	KO	3 (6), 2:49	23 Feb 2008	Salle omnisports, Abbeville, France	
14	Win	14–0	Frank Wuestenberghs	TKO	3 (8), 2:58	14 Dec 2007	Dudelange, Luxembourg	
13	Win	13–0	Zoltan Petranyi	DQ	4 (6), 2:59	25 May 2007	Dudelange, Luxembourg	
12	Win	12–0	Vlado Szabo	PTS	6	6 Apr 2007	Palais des Sports, Saint-Quentin, France	
11	Win	11–0	Gabor Gyuris	KO	1 (6), 2:55	26 Jan 2007	Salle Omnisports, Abbeville, France	
10	Win	10–0	Janos Somogyi	TKO	3 (6), 1:44	1 Dec 2006	Rene Hartmann Center, Dudelange, Luxembourg	
9	Win	9–0	Abderezak Merichiche	TKO	2 (8), 2:33	23 Mar 2006	Arris, Algeria	
8	Win	8–0	Roger Foe	TKO	3 (6), 2:46	26 Nov 2005	Salle Omnisports, Abbeville, France	
7	Win	7–0	Roger Foe	TKO	2 (6), 2:07	8 Jul 2005	Saint-Quentin, France	
6	Win	6–0	Mamadou Sacko	SD	6	17 May 2005	Parc des Sports et Loisirs, Pont-Audemer, France	
5	Win	5–0	Jerome Guennou	TKO	5 (6), 0:05	30 Apr 2005	Palais des Sports, Saint-Quentin, France	
4	Win	4–0	Leon Nzama	PTS	6	30 Nov 2004	Palais des Sports, Berck, France	
3	Win	3–0	Marek Zelo	PTS	4	22 May 2004	Berck, France	
2	Win	2–0	Ludovic Mace	PTS	4	8 May 2004	Abbeville, France	
1	Win	1–0	Stephane Poulade	KO	3 (4), 3:00	6 Feb 2004	Clermont-Ferrand, France	

Sporting positions
Regional boxing titles
Vacant Title last held by Sinan Samil Sam	WBC Mediterranean heavyweight champion 22 May 2010 – July 2011; Vacated	Vacant Title next held by Erkan Teper
Vacant Title last held by Raphael Zumbano Love	WBA Fedebol heavyweight champion 2 April 2011 – July 2011; Vacated	Vacant Title next held by Trevor Bryan
Preceded by Fabrice Aurieng	France heavyweight champion 22 June 2013 – June 2014; Vacated	Vacant Title next held by Newfel Ouatah
Vacant Title last held by Richard Towers	EBU European Union heavyweight champion 19 October 2013 – January 2014; Vacated	Vacant Title next held by Erkan Teper
Vacant Title last held by Alexander Povetkin	WBC Silver heavyweight champion 2 April 2016 – October 2017; Vacated	Vacant Title next held by Dillian Whyte
Vacant Title last held by Manuel Charr	WBA International heavyweight champion 14 December 2017 – Present	Vacant Title next held by Derek Chisora
