= 2013 Moscow Victory Day Parade =

Russian military parade

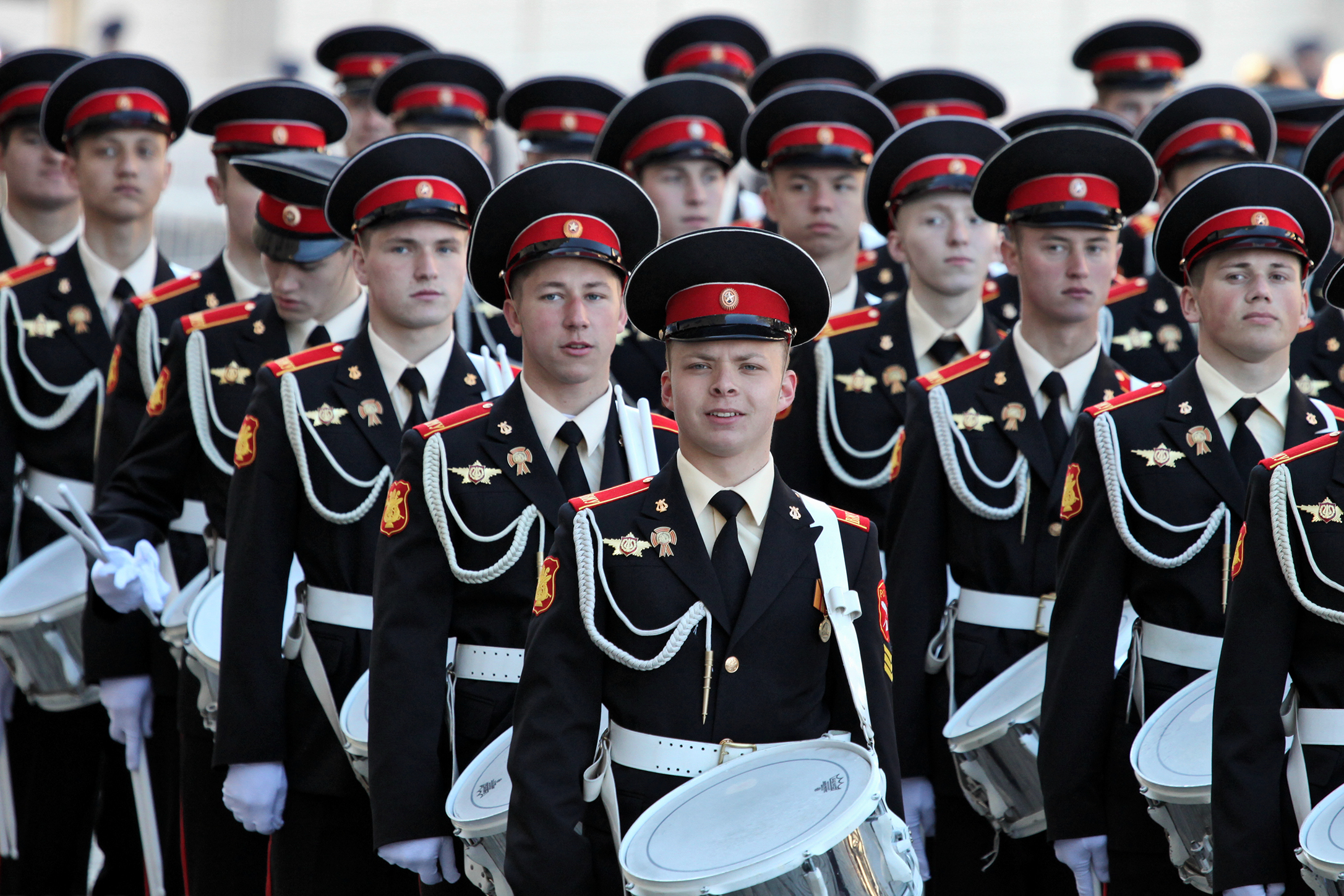
Members of the Moscow Military Music College during the parade.

The 2013 Moscow Victory Day Parade was a parade held in Red Square on 9 May 2013 to commemorate the 68th anniversary of the capitulation of the Nazi Germany in 1945. The annual parade marks the Allied victory in the Great Patriotic War on the same day as the signing of the German act of capitulation to the Allies in Berlin, at midnight of May 9, 1945 (Moscow time). The President of Russia, Vladimir Putin, delivered his tenth holiday address, and it was the first parade for both the Minister of Defense General of the Army Sergey Shoigu (parade inspector) and Russian Ground Forces commander Col. Gen. Vladimir Chirkin (parade commander), replacing Valery Gerasimov who has been promoted to Chief of the General Staff. The parade this year included the Suvorov Military School and the Nakhimov Naval School for the first time in four years, and the first appearance from a Cossack cadet corps unit, joining the more than 11,000 service personnel that marched on Red Square, and the return of the full air fly over after two years. The BTR-82A made its parade debut this year as part of the mobile column. Sevastopol in Ukraine, where the Black Sea Fleet is based, and 23 Russian cities will also hold parades on this day. As per tradition Kharkiv and Odesa in Ukraine also hold a full commemorative parade on this day as well.

== Preparation ==
Since November 2012, preparations for the parade have been well attended at the unit level. Individual and unit practices were held in the various military installations for all the participant units.

In March 2013, the full rehearsal started at the training center at Alabino, Moscow Oblast. The parade preparations started on April 11–12 for all the units as the mobile column of more than a hundred military vehicles finished up their practice runs on the field. Also undertaking practice runs are the massed military bands that will take part in the parade led by Lieutenant General Valery Khalilov in his 11th Victory Day Parade appearance and the squadron of Mil Mi-8 helicopters from the Army Aviation Training Center for the fly past segment later on, which will feature various other military aircraft. In all 68 aircraft are taking part after a 2-year absence.

Moscow practice runs for the parade proper commenced on April 24–26, 2013 on Red Square itself, and the practice runs ended on May 3 and 4 with two general practice runs. One final practice was scheduled for May 7, two days before the parade with Defense Minister Sergey Shoigu inspecting a full final rehearsal run, starting at 10 AM Moscow Time, the time in which the parade two days later will commence. Col. Gen. Chirkin led the marchers on that day's practice run on the Red Square grounds.

=== 154th Independent Commandant's Regiment's change of title ===
As the parade practices commenced on April 11, the 154th Independent Commandant's Regiment, the official honor guard regiment of the Russian Armed Forces, joined the rehearsals, this time as the 154th Independent Commandant's Preobrazhensky Regiment, the new title bestowed on it via a Presidential executive order by Vladimir Putin as Supreme Commander of the Armed Forces. That very act was done on April 9 the same year. The entrustment of an honorary title is a continuation of military traditions since the raising of the first two regiments of the Imperial Russian Army by Peter the Great as well as of both the Imperial Russian and Soviet Armies as a whole.

== Parade Participants (full list) ==
Bold indicates first appearance, italic indicates multiple appearances, Bold and italic indicate returning appearance.

- **General of the Army Sergey Shoigu, Minister of Defense of the Russian Federation** (parade inspector)
- **Colonel General Vladimir Chirkin, Commander-in-Chief of the Russian Ground Forces** (parade commander)

=== Military Bands ===
- Massed Military Bands of the Armed Forces under the direction of the Senior Director of Music of the Military Bands Service of the Armed Forces of the Russian Federation, Lieutenant General Valery Khalilov
- Corps of Drums of the Moscow Military Music School

=== Ground Column ===
- 154th Preobrazhensky Independent Commandant's Regiment Colour Guard and Honour Guard Company of the 1st Honor Guard Battalion, 154th ICR
- **Suvorov Military School** (returning)
- **Nakhimov Naval School** (returning)
- **Aksanskiy Cossack Cadet Corps** (first appearance)
- Combined Arms Academy of the Armed Forces of the Russian Federation
- Military University of the Ministry of Defence of the Russian Federation
- **Military Academy of Material and Technical Security "General of the Army A. V. Khrulev"** (first appearance)
- **Zhukovsky – Gagarin Air Force Academy** (returning)
- **Peter the Great Naval Corps - St. Petersburg Naval Institute** (first appearance)
- 336th Independent Naval Infantry Brigade
- Military Space Academy "Alexander Mozhaysky"
- **Serpukhov Military Rocket Forces Institute** (first appearance)
- **Ryazan Airborne Senior Command Academy "Gen. of the Army Vasily Margelov"** (returning)
- 98th Guards Airborne Division
- 1st NBC Coastal Brigade
- 9th Chemical Disposal Regiment
- 29th and 38th Independent Railway Brigades of the Russian Railway Troops
- OMSDON Ind. Motorized Internal Troops Division of the Ministry of Internal Affairs of the Russian Federation "Felix Dzerzhinsky"
- Civil Defense Academy of the Ministry of Emergency Situations
- Moscow Border Institute of the FSB
- 27th Independent Sevastopol Guards Motor Rifle Brigade
- 2nd Guards Tamanskaya Motor Rifle Division "Mikhail Kalinin"
- 4th Guards Kantemirovskaya Tank Division "Yuri Andropov"
- **6th Independent Chentokhovskaya Guards Tank Brigade** (first appearance)
- 288th Independent Warsaw-Brandenburg Artillery Brigade
- Military Technical University of the Federal Agency of Special Construction
- Moscow Military Commanders Training School "Supreme Soviet of Russia"

=== Mobile Column ===
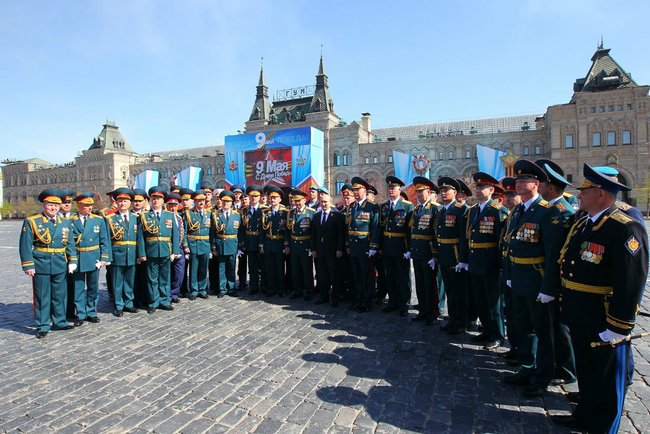
The commanders of parade with President Putin.

- GAZ-2975
- Iveco LMV
- **BTR-82A** (first appearance)
- T-90A
- 2S19 Msta-S
- Buk-M2 missile system
- S-400 Triumf
- Pantsir-S1
- 9K720 Iskander
- RT-2PM2 Topol-M

=== Air Column ===
- Mil Mi-26
- Mil Mi-8 Colors Party
- **Mil Mi-24** (returning)
- **Mil Mi-28** (returning)
- **Kamov Ka-52** (first appearance)
- **Mikoyan MiG-29** (returning)
- **Sukhoi Su-24** (returning)
- **Sukhoi Su-34** (returning)
- **Sukhoi Su-27** (returning)
- **Mikoyan MiG-31** (returning)
- **Ilyushin Il-76** (returning)
- **Ilyushin Il-78** (returning)
- **Tupolev Tu-22M3** (returning)
- **Tupolev Tu-95** (returning)
- **Tupolev Tu-160** (returning)
- **Beriev A-50** (returning)
- **Sukhoi Su-25** (returning)
- **Antonov An-124** (returning)
- **Antonov An-22** (first appearance)
- **Sukhoi Su-27 and Mikoyan MiG-29 of the Russian Knights and Strizhi** (returning)

== Music ==
Flag procession, Review, and Address

- Sacred War (Священная Война) by Alexander Alexanderov
- Solemn Triumphal March (Торжественно-Триумфальный Марш) by Valery Khalilov
- March of the Preobrazhensky Regiment (Марш Преображенского Полка) by Unknown
- Slow March of the Officers Schools (Встречный Марш офицерских училищ) by Semyon Tchernetsky
- Slow March to Carry the War Flag (Встречный Марш для выноса Боевого Знамени) by Dmitriy Valentinovich Kadeyev
- Slow March of the Guards of the Navy (Гвардейский Встречный Марш Военно-Морского Флота) by Nikolai Pavlocich Ivanov-Radkevich
- Slow March (Встречный Марш) by Evgeny Aksyonov
- Glory (Славься) by Mikhail Glinka
- Parade Fanfare All Listen! (Парадная Фанфара “Слушайте все!”) by Andrei Golovin
- State Anthem of the Russian Federation (Государственный Гимн Российской Федерации) by Alexander Alexandrov
- Signal Retreat (Сигнал “Отбой”)

Infantry Column

- March General Miloradovich (Марш “Генерал Милорадович”) by Valery Khalilov
- Triumph of the Winners (Триумф Победителей)
- We are the Army of the People (Мы Армия Народа) by Georgy Viktorovich Mavsesya
- Air March (Авиамарш) by Yuliy Abramovich Khait
- Crew is One Family (Экипаж - одна семья) by Viktor Vasilyevich Pleshak
- March of the Cosmonauts/Friends, I believe (Марш Космонавтов /Я верю, друзья) by Oskar Borisovich Feltsman
- Artillery March (Марш Артиллеристов) by Tikhon Khrennikov
- We Need One Victory (Нам Нужна Одна Победа) by Bulat Shalvovich Okudzhava
- Ballad of a Soldier (Баллада о Солдате) by Vasily Pavlovich Solovyov-Sedoy
- To Serve Russia (Служить России) by Eduard Cemyonovich Khanok
- March Hero (Марш “Герой”)
- March Parade Ground (Марш “Плац”) by Valery Khalilov
- On Guard for the Peace (На страже Мира) by Boris Alexanderovich Diev
- On the Road (В Путь) by Vasily Pavlovich Solovyov-Sedoy
- Victory Day (День Победы) by David Fyodorovich Tukhmanov

Mobile Column

- March General Miloradovich (Марш “Генерал Милорадович”) by Valery Khalilov
- Invincible and Legendary (Несокрушимая и легендарная) by Alexander Alexandrov
- March Three Tankmen (Марш “Три Танкиста”) by Pokrass Brothers
- March of the Soviet Tankists (Марш сове́тских танки́стов) by Pokrass Brothers
- Katyusha (Катюша) by Matvey Blanter
- March Victory (Марш “Победа”) by Albert Mikhailovich Arutyunov
- Artillery March (Марш Артиллеристов) by Tikhon Khrennikov

Air Column

- Invincible and Legendary (Несокрушимая и легендарная) by Alexander Alexandrov
- Air March (Авиамарш) by Yuliy Abramovich Khait
- Long Live our State (Да здравствует наша держава) by Boris Alexandrov

Conclusion

- Bow to those Great Years (Поклонимся Великим Тем Годам) by Iosif Kobzon
- Farewell of Slavianka (Прощание Славянки) by Vasiliy Agapkin

== See also ==
- Moscow Victory Parade of 1945
- Victory Day (9 May)
