= Mahmoud Charr =

German boxer (born 1984)

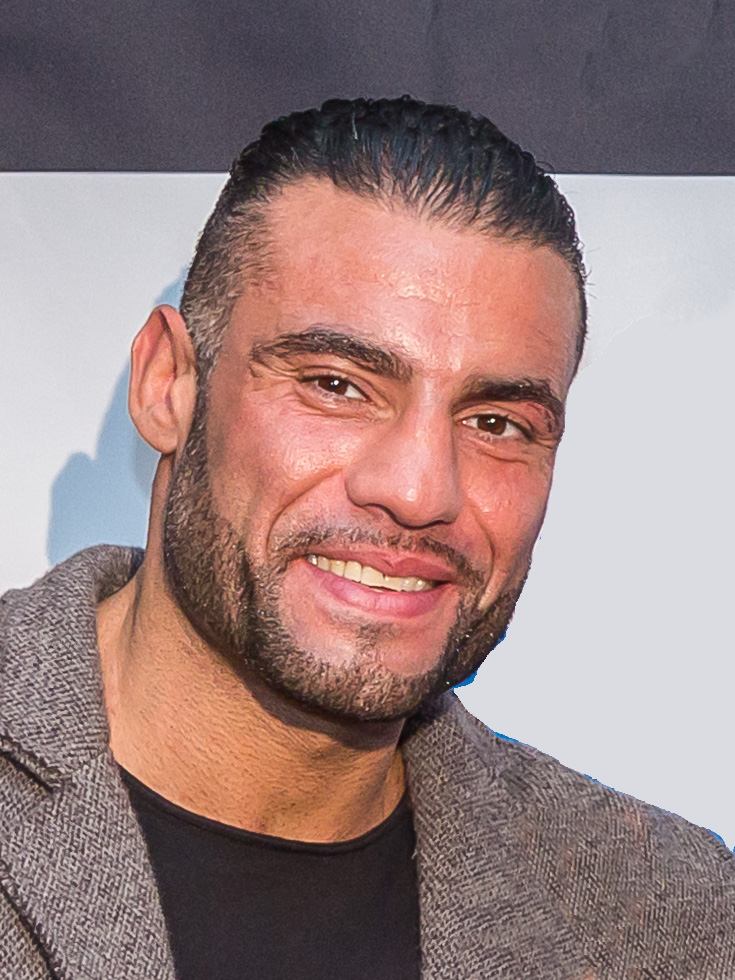

Personal information
- Nickname: Diamond Boy
- Nationality: Syria; Germany
- Born: Mahmoud Omeirat Charr; October 1984 (age 41) Homs, Syria, or Beirut, Lebanon
- Height: 1.92 m (6 ft 3 1/2 in)
- Weight: Heavyweight

Boxing career
- Reach: 195 cm (77 in)
- Stance: Orthodox

Boxing record
- Total fights: 39
- Wins: 34
- Win by KO: 20
- Losses: 5

Mahmoud Charr (Arabic: محمود عميرات شعار), previously known as Manuel Charr, is a Syrian-German professional boxer. He held the World Boxing Association (WBA) heavyweight title (Regular version) twice between 2017 and 2024.

== Early life ==
Charr is the son of a Syrian father and a Lebanese mother; he has claimed he was born in Beirut, Lebanon, but official record-keepers list his birthplace as Homs, Syria. In 1989, his mother fled to Germany with six of her eight children. His father had died in the Lebanese Civil War. Charr started his martial arts career with Muay Thai at the age of 17. Two years later, he became the German Champion and the European Champion in Thai Boxing at age 19, the youngest German champion to date. At one point, Charr was invited to a training camp for professional boxers at the famous Max Schmeling Gym in Berlin, where his professional boxing career started under the supervision of the famous German boxing coach Ulli Wegner.

== Amateur career ==
- 2002 TeutoCup Champion (Germany)
- 2003 District Champion (Germany)
- 2004 Westfahlen Champion (Germany)
- 2004 Western German Champion

== Professional career ==
After compiling a perfect record of 21–0, Charr fought WBC heavyweight champion Vitali Klitschko on September 8, 2012 in Moscow, Russia. Charr was knocked down in the second round with a right hook, and he lost the bout by fourth-round technical knockout when it was stopped due to a cut received as a result of Klitschko's punches. Charr strongly protested the stoppage but the decision remained the same, giving Charr the first defeat of his professional career.

Charr defended his WBC International Silver heavyweight title against Yakup Saglam in Galaţi, Romania on February 22, 2013.

He turned up to the post-fight press conference of the David Haye vs. Derek Chisora fight on 14 July 2012 in order to challenge the victorious Haye. Charr and Haye agreed to fight at Manchester Arena on 29 June 2013, but on 14 May, Haye pulled out due to a hand injury sustained in training. Haye went on to agree to fight undefeated Tyson Fury instead on 28 September, but that bout was also cancelled.

Charr improved his record to 26–1 with wins over Oleksiy Mazikin, Dennis Bakhtov and Kevin Johnson, before challenging highly-ranked Alexander Povetkin on 30 May 2014 for the vacant WBC International title in Moscow, Russia. Charr lost the bout by seventh-round knockout, suffering his second career loss.

Charr's fight against Povetkin was the first of five consecutive bouts that subsequently took place in Russia, the last of which was a brutal one-punch fifth-round knockout defeat to Mairis Breidis on 22 August 2015 in Grozny, Chechnya.

After improving to 30–4, Charr faced Alexander Ustinov for the vacant WBA (Regular) title in Oberhausen, Germany on 25 November 2017, and won by unanimous decision. Despite the "Regular" title being secondary to the WBA's "Super" title which at the time was held by Anthony Joshua, the victory nonetheless meant that Charr was the first German heavyweight world champion in 85 years.

A few days before Charr was scheduled to defend his WBA (Regular) title against Fres Oquendo in September 2018, Charr tested positive for drostanolone and trenbolone, and as a result the fight was cancelled.

In January 2021, Charr was stripped of his WBA (Regular) title due to inactivity. More than 3 years since he last fought, Charr returned to the ring on 15 May 2021 and recorded his 32nd career victory, with a second-round knockout of undefeated Christopher Lovejoy. Following extensive litigation with the WBA, Charr's title was restored on 31 August 2023 as part of a court settlement, and he was ordered to defend against Jarrell Miller by 14 October of that year, with the winner to face the next highest contender. This came just five days after the WBA eliminated the "regular" title in a consolidation bout that was part of the organization's efforts to reduce the number of champions per division. The 14 October deadline came and went, the fight with Miller failing to materialize due to reported financial issues. As a result, the WBA granted Charr a 60-day extension to find a new opponent.

Eventually, Charr was scheduled to fight Kubrat Pulev in Bulgaria on March 30, 2024. Charr tore his bicep in training and fight was postponed until September. The fight eventually took place on 7 December 2024 in Sofia, Bulgaria, with Pulev winning a unanimous points decision and the WBA (Regular) title.

== Personal life ==
In 2015, an altercation at a kebab shop in Essen, Germany led to a drive-by shooting which left Charr shot four times in the abdomen and forced to undergo emergency surgery that night to save his life. Charr was dining with rapper Kay One at the time of the incident, which occurred following an argument with an online troll who had been abusing the boxer for some weeks. The perpetrator, whom Charr identified to police, turned himself in to the police. Charr underwent double-hip replacement surgery in May 2017.

Charr announced on social media that on April 24, 2024 his first son was born in the Kings College Hospital of Dubai.

== Professional boxing record ==
39 fights	34 wins	5 losses
By knockout	20	3
By decision	13	2
By disqualification	1	0

No.	Result	Record	Opponent	Type	Round, time	Date	Location	Notes
39	Loss	34–5	Kubrat Pulev	UD	12	7 Dec 2024	Arena Armeec, Sofia, Bulgaria	Lost WBA (Regular) heavyweight title
38	Win	34–4	Nuri Seferi	TKO	2 (10), 2:56	21 Dec 2022	ECB Boxgym, Hamburg, Germany	
37	Win	33–4	Nikola Milačić	KO	3 (10), 1:21	28 May 2022	Die Bucht, Hamburg, Germany	
36	Win	32–4	Christopher Lovejoy	KO	2 (12), 1:09	15 May 2021	Box Gym, Cologne, Nordrhein-Westfalen, Germany	
35	Win	31–4	Alexander Ustinov	UD	12	25 Nov 2017	König Pilsener Arena, Oberhausen, Germany	Won vacant WBA (Regular) heavyweight title
34	Win	30–4	Sefer Seferi	UD	10	17 Sep 2016	EWS Arena, Göppingen, Germany	Won vacant WBA International heavyweight title
33	Win	29–4	Andrei Mazanik	TKO	7 (8), 2:08	4 Jun 2016	Autohaus Duerkop, Kassel, Germany	
32	Loss	28–4	Mairis Briedis	KO	5 (10), 2:55	22 Aug 2015	Akhmat-Arena, Grozny, Russia	
31	Win	28–3	Alex Leapai	UD	10	22 May 2015	Olympic Indoor Arena, Moscow, Russia	
30	Loss	27–3	Johann Duhaupas	MD	10	10 Apr 2015	Olympic Indoor Arena, Moscow, Russia	
29	Win	27–2	Michael Grant	RTD	5 (10), 3:00	24 Oct 2014	Olympic Indoor Arena, Moscow, Russia	
28	Loss	26–2	Alexander Povetkin	KO	7 (12), 1:09	30 May 2014	Luzhniki, Moscow, Russia	For vacant WBC International heavyweight title
27	Win	26–1	Kevin Johnson	UD	10	12 Apr 2014	Telekom Dome, Bonn, Germany	
26	Win	25–1	Dennis Bakhtov	RTD	5 (12), 3:00	19 Oct 2013	Messehalle, Leipzig, Germany	Retained WBC International Silver and WBC Mediterranean heavyweight titles; Won vacant WBC CIS and Slovac Boxing Bureau (CISBB) heavyweight titles
25	Win	24–1	Oleksiy Mazikin	KO	3 (12), 2:10	15 Jun 2013	Karl Eckel Halle, Hattersheim am Main, Germany	Retained WBC Mediterranean heavyweight title
24	Win	23–1	Yakup Saglam	RTD	2 (12), 3:00	22 Feb 2013	Galaţi Skating Rink, Galaţi, Romania	Retained WBC International Silver heavyweight title
23	Win	22–1	Konstantin Airich	KO	1 (12), 0:44	22 Dec 2012	Maritim Hotel, Cologne, Germany	Won vacant WBC Mediterranean heavyweight title
22	Loss	21–1	Vitali Klitschko	TKO	4 (12), 2:04	8 Sep 2012	Olympic Indoor Arena, Moscow, Russia	For WBC heavyweight title
21	Win	21–0	Taras Bidenko	UD	12	30 Mar 2012	Maritim Hotel, Cologne, Germany	Retained WBC International Silver heavyweight title
20	Win	20–0	Marcelo Nascimento	RTD	8 (12), 3:00	18 Nov 2011	Kugelbake-Halle, Cuxhaven, Germany	Won vacant WBC International Silver heavyweight title
19	Win	19–0	Serdar Uysal	DQ	1 (6), 1:28	3 Sep 2011	Kugelbake-Halle, Cuxhaven, Germany	
18	Win	18–0	Danny Williams	TKO	7 (8), 1:16	25 Jun 2011	Lanxess-Arena, Cologne, Germany	
17	Win	17–0	Jonathan Pasi	TKO	5 (8), 2:58	19 Feb 2011	Porsche Arena, Stuttgart, Germany	
16	Win	16–0	Zack Page	MD	8	4 Dec 2010	Sport Center, Schwerin, Germany	
15	Win	15–0	Robert Hawkins	RTD	5 (8), 3:00	19 Nov 2010	Universum Gym, Hamburg, Germany	
14	Win	14–0	Owen Beck	TKO	10 (10), 2:44	9 Jan 2010	Bordelandhalle, Magdeburg, Germany	
13	Win	13–0	Sherman Williams	UD	10	10 Oct 2009	Stadthalle, Rostock, Germany	
12	Win	12–0	Ramon Hayes	TKO	3 (8), 0:42	6 Jun 2009	Koenig Arena, Oberhausen, Germany	
11	Win	11–0	Gbenga Oloukun	KO	7 (8), 1:29	25 Apr 2009	König Palast, Krefeld, Germany	
10	Win	10–0	Adnan Serin	UD	6	31 May 2008	Burg-Waechter, Düsseldorf, Germany	
9	Win	9–0	Edgars Kalnārs	UD	4	19 Apr 2008	Bordelandhalle, Magdeburg, Germany	
8	Win	8–0	Aleksandrs Selezens	UD	4	5 Apr 2008	Burg-Waechter, Düsseldorf, Germany	
7	Win	7–0	Pedro Carrion	MD	8	13 May 2006	Stadthalle, Zwickau, Germany	
6	Win	6–0	Radovan Kuca	KO	1 (6), 1:35	8 Apr 2006	Saaltheater Geulen, Aachen, Germany	
5	Win	5–0	Stefan Baumann	TKO	1 (6), 0:38	28 Jan 2006	Tempodrom, Berlin, Germany	
4	Win	4–0	Valentin Marinel	KO	2 (4), 0:40	16 Jul 2005	Arena Nürnberger Versicherung, Nuremberg, Germany	
3	Win	3–0	Özcan Cetinkaya	UD	4	11 Jun 2005	Big Box, Kempten, Germany	
2	Win	2–0	Nandor Kovacs	TKO	2 (4)	28 May 2005	Lugner City, Vienna, Austria	
1	Win	1–0	David Vicena	UD	4	14 May 2005	Oberfrankenhalle, Bayreuth, Germany	

== Viewership ==
=== International ===
Date	Fight	Country	Network	Viewers	Source
8 September 2012	Vitali Klitschko vs. Manuel Charr	Germany	RTL Television	8,750,000	
Total viewership				8,750,000	

Sporting positions
Regional boxing titles
New title	WBC International Silver heavyweight champion 18 November 2011 – July 2014	Vacant Title next held by Edmund Gerber
Vacant Title next held by Andrzej Wawrzyk	WBC Baltic heavyweight champion 21 December 2012 – June 2013	Vacant Title next held by Artur Szpilka
Vacant Title last held by Erkan Teper	WBC Mediterranean heavyweight champion 21 December 2012 – March 2014	Vacant Title next held by Agit Kabayel
Vacant Title last held by Andrzej Wawrzyk	WBC CIS & Slovac Boxing Bureau (CISBB) heavyweight champion 19 October 2013 – July 2015	Vacant Title next held by Apti Davtaev
Vacant Title next held by Eugene Hill	WBA International heavyweight champion 17 September 2016 – December 2017	Vacant Title next held by Johann Duhaupas
World boxing titles
Vacant Title last held by Ruslan Chagaev	WBA heavyweight champion Regular title 25 November 2017 – 29 January 2021; Status changed	Vacant Title next held by Trevor Bryan
Vacant Title last held by Daniel Dubois	WBA heavyweight champion Regular title 31 August 2023 – 7 December 2024	Succeeded by Kubrat Pulev
Honorary boxing titles
Vacant Title last held by Ruslan Chagaev	WBA heavyweight champion in recess Regular title 29 January 2021 – 3 January 2022; Stripped	Vacant
