= Lee Roy Murphy =

American boxer (born 1958)

Personal information
- Nickname: Solid Gold
- Nationality: American
- Born: Lee Roy Murphy; July 16, 1958 (age 68) Chicago, Illinois, USA
- Height: 5 ft 11 in (180 cm)
- Weight: Cruiserweight; Heavyweight

Boxing career
- Stance: Orthodox

Boxing record
- Total fights: 34
- Wins: 30
- Win by KO: 23
- Losses: 4
- Draws: 0
- No contests: 0

Lee Roy Murphy (born July 16, 1958) is a retired American professional boxer. He held the IBF cruiserweight title from 1984 to 1986.

== Amateur career ==
Murphy represented Chicago at three consecutive Intercity Golden Gloves dispatching his rivals with first-round knockouts in 1977 and 1978, and winning the 1979 Light Heavyweight National Golden Gloves and earning a spot on the 1980 United States Olympic team. However, as the USA boycotted the 1980 Summer Olympics in Moscow due to political reasons, Murphy and the rest of his team were not granted Olympic berths. Murphy did, however, receive one of 461 Congressional Gold Medals created specifically for the boycotted athletes. Instead the U.S. team dispatched to West Germany for a match-up with the West German national team, and then to Kenya, to compete in the inaugural Gold Cup international boxing tournament funded partially by the U.S. State Department, for the benefit of countries which boycotted the Summer Olympics. He is now 64 years old, living with his wife Barbara and his daughter Ariel Murphy with his grandchildren Matthew Townsend, Brooklyn Lewis, and Eloni Lewis.

Leeroy Murphy was inducted into the Hall of Fame in Los Angeles, California in May 2022.

=== Highlights ===
(gold) Chicago Golden Gloves (165 lbs), International Amphitheatre, Chicago, Illinois, March 1976:

- (no data available)

USA–USSR Duals (165 lbs), Las Vegas, Nevada, January 1977:

- Lost to Gennadiy Tolmachyov (Soviet Union) by decision

National Golden Gloves (165 lbs), Honolulu, Hawaii, March 1977:

- 1/4: Lost to Keith Broom by decision

(gold) Chicago Golden Gloves (165 lbs), International Amphitheatre, Chicago, Illinois, March 1977:

- Finals: Defeated Mark Scully by unanimous decision, 5–0

(gold) 35th Intercity Golden Gloves (165 lbs), Madison Square Garden, New York City, April 1977:

- Defeated Paul Christiani KO 1

AAU National Championships (178 lbs), Ohio State Fair, Columbus, Ohio, August 1977:

- Finals: Lost to Mark Frazie by decision (Murphy knocked down once)

USA–Romania Duals (178 lbs), Milwaukee, Wisconsin, January 1978:

- Lost to Constantin Dafinoiu (Romania) by decision

National Golden Gloves (178 lbs), Albuquerque, New Mexico, March 1978:

- 1/16: Defeated Dennis Stanley KO 2
- 1/8: Defeated Sonny Westbrook RSC 1
- 1/4: Defeated Ron Brown by decision
- 1/2: Lost to Charles Singleton by decision

(gold) Chicago Golden Gloves (178 lbs), International Amphitheatre, Chicago, Illinois, April 1978:

- Finals: Defeated Willie Phillips

(gold) 36th Intercity Golden Gloves (178 lbs), Chicago, Illinois, April 1978:

- Defeated Ron Huston KO 1

(silver) Chemistry Cup (178 lbs), Halle, East Germany, June 1978:

- Finals: Lost to Michael Seefeldt (East Germany) RSC 1

National Sports Festival (178 lbs), Fort Carson, Colorado, July 1978:

- 1/2: Lost to Elmer Martin by decision

USA–USSR Duals (178 lbs), Troy, New York, February 1979:

- Lost to Nikolay Yerofeyev (Soviet Union) by decision

USA–Poland Duals (178 lbs), Milwaukee, Wisconsin, February 1979:

- Defeated Jacek Kucharczyk (Poland) by split decision, 2–1

(gold) National Golden Gloves (178 lbs), Indianapolis, Indiana, March 1979:

- 1/2: Defeated Steve Adams RSC 1
- Finals: Defeated Alvino Manson KO 1

(gold) 37th Intercity Golden Gloves (178 lbs), Madison Square Garden, New York City, April 1979:

- Defeated Porfirio Llanes RSC 1 (2:30)

Pan Am Trials (178 lbs), Toledo, Ohio, May 1979:

- 1/2: Lost to Andre McCoy by split decision, 2–3

USSR–USA Duals (178 lbs), Moscow, Soviet Union, January 1980:

- Defeated Nikolay Yerofeyev (Soviet Union) by split decision, 2–1

National Golden Gloves (178 lbs), Hirsch Memorial Coliseum, Shreveport, Louisiana, March 1980:

- 1/8: Defeated Thomas Landry by split decision, 3–2
- 1/4: Defeated Jay Strickland by decision
- 1/2: Lost to Bernard Benton by decision

Olympic Trials (178 lbs), Atlanta, Georgia, June 1980:

- 1/4: Defeated Bluford Spencer RSC 3 (2:14)
- 1/2: Defeated Steve Eden by unanimous decision, 5–0
- Finals: Defeated Elmer Martin KO 1 (0:56)

FRG–USA Duals, West Berlin, West Germany, July 1980:

- Defeated Kurt Seiler (West Germany) by decision

(gold) Gold Cup (178 lbs), Nairobi, Kenya, September 1980:

- Finals: Defeated Danny Jackson (Puerto Rico) by decision

He finished his amateur career having 162 victories to his credit.

== Professional career ==
Known as "Solid Gold", Murphy turned pro in 1980 and won the IBF Cruiserweight Title with a 14th-round TKO of Marvin Camel in 1984. He defended the title three times before losing the belt to Ricky Parkey in 1986. After the loss, Murphy's career drifted into obscurity with losses to Dwight Muhammad Qawi in 1987 and Mike Evans in 1991. He retired after the loss to Evans, but launched a brief comeback in 1998, winning both of his bouts.

== Personal ==
Lee Roy's brother, Kenny Murphy, was also a prizefighter and fought Fabrice Tiozzo for the WBA Cruiserweight Title in 1999. He won four Intercity Golden Gloves' championships in 1977 at 165 lb. and in 1978 through 1980 at 178 lb.

Lee Roy gave up fighting and focused on his family life, now residing in the Chicago suburbs and spending time with his wife, Barbara Murphy, their daughters Tabitha Townsend and Ariel Murphy, along with his six grandchildren Matthew Townsend, Brooklyn Lewis, Eloni Lewis, Parker Lewis, Clint towers and Krue Jefferson. Lee Roy lives a quiet and private life.

Although he lives a private life, Lee Roy makes his appearance on special occasions. His most recent appearance, In May of 2022, Lee Roy was inducted into the Los Angeles boxing hall of fame. He was accompanied by his wife, Barbara Murphy and his two granddaughters, Brooklyn Lewis and Eloni Lewis.

== Professional boxing record ==
34 fights	30 wins	4 losses
By knockout	23	2
By decision	7	2

No.	Result	Record	Opponent	Type	Round, time	Date	Location	Notes
34	Win	30–4	(United States) Kimmuel Odum	UD	6	07/08/1998	(United States) Chicago, Illinois, U.S.	
33	Win	29–4	(United States) Jerry Brown	TKO	4	26/06/1998	(United States) Alumni Hall, Chicago, Illinois, U.S.	Referee stopped the bout at 2:40 of the fourth round.
32	Loss	28–4	(United States) Mike Evans	UD	12	02/03/1991	(United Kingdom) Dolphin Centre, Darlington, England	IBF Intercontinental Heavyweight Title.
31	Win	28–3	(United States) Terry Armstrong	UD	10	12/09/1990	(United States) Gateway Theatre, Chicago, Illinois, U.S.	
30	Loss	27–3	(South Africa) Johnny du Plooy	PTS	10	09/06/1990	(Bophuthatswana) Sun City, South Africa	
29	Win	27–2	(United States) Alfonso Ratliff	KO	4	26/06/1989	(United States) Odeum Expo Center, Villa Park, Illinois, U.S.	Illinois Heavyweight Title.
28	Loss	26–2	(United States) Dwight Muhammad Qawi	TKO	6	15/08/1987	Saint-Tropez, France	
27	Win	26–1	(United States) Bobby Crabtree	UD	10	28/04/1987	(United States) Chicago, Illinois, U.S.	
26	Win	25–1	(United States) Steve Mormino	PTS	8	27/03/1987	Viareggio, Italy	
25	Loss	24–1	(United States) Rickey Parkey	TKO	10	25/10/1986	Marsala, Italy	Lost IBF cruiserweight title
24	Win	24–0	(United States) Dorcy Gaymon	KO	9	19/04/1986	Sanremo Casino, Sanremo, Italy	Retained IBF cruiserweight title
23	Win	23–0	(Zambia) Chisanda Mutti	KO	12	19/10/1985	Stade Louis II, Monte Carlo, Monaco	Retained IBF cruiserweight title
22	Win	22–0	(United States) Eddie Taylor	TKO	12	20/12/1984	(United States) Chicago, Illinois, U.S.	Retained IBF cruiserweight title
21	Win	21–0	(United States) Marvin Camel	TKO	14	06/10/1984	(United States) MetraPark Arena, Billings, Montana, U.S.	Won IBF cruiserweight title
20	Win	20–0	(United States) Darnell Hayes	KO	2	15/03/1984	(United States) Chicago, Illinois, U.S.	
19	Win	19–0	(United States) Steve Zouski	UD	10	20/12/1983	(United States) Chicago, Illinois, U.S.	
18	Win	18–0	(United States) Ralph Cuomo	TKO	1	02/12/1983	(United States) Shirley, New York, U.S.	
17	Win	17–0	(United States) Willie Crawford	TKO	1	07/11/1983	(United States) Chicago, Illinois, U.S.	
16	Win	16–0	(United States) Frank Payne	UD	10	18/10/1983	(United States) Atlantic City, New Jersey, U.S.	
15	Win	15–0	(United States) Keith Allen	TKO	6	05/10/1983	(United States) Chicago, Illinois, U.S.	Referee stopped the bout at 0:39 of the sixth round.
14	Win	14–0	(United States) Ivy Brown	KO	1	07/08/1983	(United States) Paradise, Nevada, U.S.	Brown knocked out at 2:13 of the first round.
13	Win	13–0	(United States) Rahim Muhammad	KO	9	22/05/1983	(United States) Chicago, Illinois, U.S.	
12	Win	12–0	(United States) Charles Allen	KO	4	07/02/1983	(United States) Chicago, Illinois, U.S.	Allen knocked out at 1:25 of the first round.
11	Win	11–0	(United States) Terry Denny	KO	3	19/07/1982	(United States) Chicago, Illinois, U.S.	Denny knocked out at 1:28 of the third round.
10	Win	10–0	(United States) Eddie Smith	KO	4	19/03/1982	(United States) Chicago, Illinois, U.S.	Smith knocked out at 2:09 of the fourth round.
9	Win	9–0	(United States) Charles Presswood	KO	1	05/02/1982	(United States) Civic Center, Danville, Illinois, U.S.	Presswood knocked out at 2:39 of the first round.
8	Win	8–0	(United States) Frank Diaper	TKO	2	22/01/1982	(United States) Chicago, Illinois, U.S.	Referee stopped the bout at 2:43 of the second round.
7	Win	7–0	(United States) Elvis Parks	PTS	6	03/10/1981	(United States) Rosemont Horizon, Rosemont, Illinois, U.S.	Parks down twice in the sixth round.
6	Win	6–0	(United States) John Trollinger	KO	1	27/07/1981	(United States) Chicago, Illinois, U.S.	Trollinger knocked out at 0:35 of the first round.
5	Win	5–0	(United States) Darnell Hayes	K0	2	05/06/1981	(United States) Chicago, Illinois, U.S.	Hayes knocked out at 2:01 of the second round.
4	Win	4–0	(United States) Reggie Walker	TKO	2	16/04/1981	(United States) Chicago, Illinois, U.S.	Referee stopped the bout at 2:25 of the second round.
3	Win	3–0	(United States) Floyd Cross	KO	3	09/03/1981	(United States) Chicago, Illinois, U.S.	Cross down three times in the first round and knocked out at 2:53 of the third round.
2	Win	2–0	(Canada) Gary Hunter	KO	1	11/12/1980	(United States) Chicago, Illinois, U.S.	Hunter knocked out at 1:34 of the first round.
1	Win	1–0	(United States) Roger Moore	KO	2	13/11/1980	(United States) Chicago, Illinois, U.S.	Moore knocked out at 1:22 of the second round.

== See also ==
- List of world cruiserweight boxing champions

Sporting positions
Amateur boxing titles
Previous: Charles Singleton	Golden Gloves light heavyweight champion 1979	Next: Steve Eden
Regional boxing titles
Preceded by Alfonso Ratliff	Illinois State Heavy title June 26, 1989 – 1990; Vacated	Vacant Title next held by Ed Krasnici
World boxing titles
Preceded by Marvin Camel	IBF cruiserweight champion October 6, 1984 - October 25, 1986	Succeeded by Rickey Parkey
