= Joe Cortez =

American boxer

Personal information
- Nickname: ASJ
- Born: October 13, 1945 (age 80) Harlem, New York, U.S.
- Weight: Featherweight

Boxing career

Boxing record
- Total fights: 18
- Wins: 17
- Win by KO: 2
- Losses: 1

Joe Cortez (born October 13, 1945) is an American former boxing referee. He was inducted into the International Boxing Hall of Fame in 2011.

== Biography ==
Cortez is of Puerto Rican descent. He had an amateur boxing career, winning various Golden Gloves tournaments from 1960 to 1962. In 1963, Joe turned pro at the age of eighteen. He had a record of ten wins and one defeat as a professional boxer, and the loss was to Georgie Foster from Ohio. He retired from boxing after only eleven professional fights. Cortez moved to Puerto Rico in 1969, working at The El Conquistador Hotel there; he worked his way up to Executive Assistant manager. Living there, he became fluent in Spanish. In 1977, he moved back to New York where he started work as a Casino Operations Manager for the El San Juan Hotel, one of the three properties in Puerto Rico.

Beginning in the 1977, Cortez started working as a referee. During the 1980s, he took on the responsibility to referee Championship fights. During this time he was the third man in the ring in several professional Mike Tyson and Roberto Durán fights.

As referees Richard Steele and Mills Lane retired at the start of the 21st century, Cortez became one of Nevada and New York's preferred boxing referees for world title fights. He has refereed over 170 world title bouts, among which figure the first Oscar De La Hoya-Julio César Chávez meeting, Evander Holyfield and Riddick Bowe's first title fight and the match that saw 45-year-old George Foreman become the oldest World Heavyweight Champion in history. Asked by Telemundo personnel to give a prediction about the first de la Hoya-Chávez meeting prior to the fight taking place, he simply answered "I can't make any predictions", as referees are not allowed to do that before a fight (doing so might indicate favouritism towards one of the combatants).

Cortez still refereed boxing events, and his catchphrase during pre-fight instructions, "(I am) fair but firm!" (also said as "I'm fair but I'm firm!") is now a registered trademark. Cortez also gives boxing classes and has a website www.Fairbutfirm.com, which teaches someone how to become a referee and talk show host.

He appears in the film Rocky Balboa as the referee in the exhibition bout between Balboa and the fictional champion Mason "The Line" Dixon played by the professional boxer Antonio Tarver, as well as in I Spy with Eddie Murphy and in Play It To The Bone with Antonio Banderas and Woody Harrelson.

The last "Fight of the Year" that he refereed was Amir Khan vs. Marcos Maidana in 2010. He called it "one of the most outstanding, skillful and exciting" championship fights that he refereed in his career.

Cortez was inducted into the New Jersey Boxing Hall of Fame in November 1998 and into the International Boxing Hall of Fame in 2011.

In 1999 he refereed a Pro Wrestling match at WWC Aniversario for the WWC Universal Heavyweight Championship between Carlos Colón against champion Ray González. Colón pinned González to become the WWC Universal Champion.

He retired from refereeing in September 2012 after Canelo Alvarez vs Josesito Lopez fight, and is a boxing analyst for ESPN Sports.

In 2017, Cortez assisted Conor McGregor with his transition to boxing for his super fight with Floyd Mayweather Jr. Cortez was acting as the referee during Conor's sparring sessions while training for the bout.

In 2020, at the age of 75, Cortez was hospitalized after contracting COVID-19 and pneumonia but said "...I assure my people in Puerto Rico that I will return.”

== Professional boxing record ==
18 fights	17 wins	1 loss
By knockout	2	0
By decision	15	1

No.	Result	Record	Opponent	Type	Round, time	Date	Location	Notes
14	Win	13–1	(Dominican Republic) Sal Lacheppele	PTS	4/4	Feb 28, 1970	San Juan, Puerto Rico	
13	Win	12–1	(Puerto Rico) Durango Kid	PTS	6/6	Mar 1, 1966	(United States) Sunnyside Garden, Sunnyside, Queens, New York, US	
12	Win	11–1	(Puerto Rico) Hector Rodriguez	UD	6/6	Feb 10, 1966	(United States) Exposition Building, Portland, Maine, US	
11	Win	10–1	(United States) Angel Rivera	PTS	6/6	Feb 1, 1966	(United States) Sunnyside Garden, Sunnyside, Queens, New York, US	
10	Win	9–1	(Mexico) Luis Molinares	KO	3/4	Jul 31, 1965	Nuevo Laredo, Tamaulipas, Mexico	
9	Win	8–1	(Guam) Paul Sebastian	PTS	4/4	Feb 16, 1965	(United States) Civic Auditorium, Honolulu, Hawaii, US	
8	Win	7–1	(Japan) Katsutomi Takano	UD	4/4	Oct 27, 1964	(United States) Civic Auditorium, Honolulu, Hawaii, US	
7	Win	6–1	(Guam) Paul Sebastian	PTS	4/4	Oct 13, 1964	(United States) Civic Auditorium, Honolulu, Hawaii, US	
6	Win	5–1	(Guam) Paul Sebastian	PTS	4/4	Sep 22, 1964	(United States) Honolulu International Center, Honolulu, Hawaii, US	
5	Loss	4–1	(United States) George Foster	PTS	6/6	May 25, 1963	(United States) Madison Square Garden, New York, New York, US	
4	Win	4–0	(Mexico) Eliseo García	PTS	4/4	Mar 9, 1963	Monterrey, Nuevo León, Mexico	
3	Win	3–0	(Mexico) Cosme Rodriguez	PTS	4/4	Feb 26, 1963	Auditorio Municipal, Ciudad Juarez, Mexico	
2	Win	2–0	(United States) Bobby Harmon	PTS	4/4	Jan 28, 1963	(United States) Civic Center, Baltimore, Maryland, US	
1	Win	1–0	(Puerto Rico) Tony Salgado	KO	2/4	Dec 3, 1962	(United States) Bakersfield Dome, Bakersfield, California, US	Professional debut

== See also ==
- Spanish Golden Gloves
- Sports in Puerto Rico

Preceded by Edward Medina	New York Daily News Golden Gloves; Novice Flyweight Champion; 1960	Succeeded by George Colon
Preceded by Ray Cruz	New York Daily News Golden Gloves; Open Bantamweight Champion; 1961	Succeeded by Ray Cruz
Preceded by Mike Loucas	New York Golden Gloves Tournament of Champions; Bantamweight Champion; 1961	Succeeded by Tournament ends
Preceded by Pete Spanakos	Intercity Golden Gloves; Bantamweight Champion; 1961	Succeeded by Tournament lapse until 1977
