= Silver Skates (New York City) =

Defunct American speed skating meet

- Association: Middle Atlantic Skating Association
- Sport: Ice speed skating
- Founder: Al Copland
- First season: 1922
- Folded: 1960
- Organizing body: New York Daily News
- Country: United States
- Most titles: Arnold Uhrlass (4 Races of Champions); Patterson Skating Club (3 team titles)

The Silver Skates Derby, often called the New York Silver Skates, was an amateur speed skating tournament organized by the New York Daily News, and hosted at several New York City locations over its existence. It was first held in 1922, with the last edition on record taking place in 1960. It was part of a number of similarly named competitions that accompanied a boom in the sport's popularity in early 20th century United States.

== History ==
=== Origins ===
The event was created and originally organized by Daily News sports writer Al Copland, with assistance from colleague and later novelist Paul Gallico. Shortly after its announcement, it received approval from the Middle Atlantic Skating Association, the sport's regional governing body. Starting in 1927, the organization was credited to an affiliated entity, first the New York Daily News' Athletic Association, and later the New York Daily News' Welfare Association, that newspaper's charitable foundation. The net profit was distributed to an ecumenical selection of New York area religious charities, as well as secular relief groups such as the Red Cross and the United Hospital Fund.

The event's name was inspired by the fictional speed skating contest entered by the hero of Mary Mapes Dodge's young adult novel Hans Brinker, or The Silver Skates. Due to the book's popularity at the time, the name was shared with many other speed skating competitions of varying stature throughout the U.S. The inaugural edition was won by Al Leitch of West Orange, New Jersey, in front of 12,000 spectators at Lewisohn Stadium, in a time of 6:56.2-5 over 2 miles. After four years there, the event moved to Central Park, which already hosted the Metropolitan Skating Championships and Ice Carnival since 1923.

The contest's immediate success inspired the Daily News to create a similar one for amateur boxing, the New York Golden Gloves, which was launched in 1926. In the pre-World War II period, the New York Silver Skates enjoyed sizeable participation, drawing 1,625 entrants in 1940. It was one the three leading events promoted by the paper, with the Golden Gloves and dancesport's Harvest Moon Ball, which were also held at Madison Square Garden for much of their history.

=== Transition to indoors ===
The New York Silver Skates started as an outdoor meet, and were sometimes disrupted by warm weather. The tenth edition, initially held on 18 January 1931, was stopped three laps into the Men's senior race as the ice was looking increasingly dangerous, with Herbert Taylor leading in front of a reported 40,000. It was rescheduled on the following weekend, but attendance suffered, falling to just 10,000. The event was postponed indefinitely and later cancelled in 1932 and 1933. It was able to take place in 1934 but was postponed four times in 1935, including on 3 February when a 35,000-strong crowd had to be sent home, before being cancelled again. To avoid further disappointments, it was decided to take the event indoors at Madison Square Garden, starting in 1936. The decision was taken on short notice, as registration forms left the location TBA, and the final announcement was made by the Daily News in early January.

== Format ==
The meet was sanctioned by the Middle Atlantic Skating Association, the regional affiliate of the Amateur Skating Union of the United States. Its main event was the Silver Skates Derby, the men's senior final, which gave the entire gathering its name.

The competition featured races for NY area skaters of both genders in a number of age classes and distances. The Silver Skate Derby, or Men's senior race, was 2-mile long in the inaugural event, as in the final edition on record. The 1922 installment also comprised a Junior Silver Skates Derby for boys, and a Girl's Derby. These two races were originally 1 mile in length. The length of a lap was fixed at 1/6-mile. More classes were later added, and the length of the undercard races varied. When the event moved indoors at MSG, it adopted a 110-yard lap length, or approximately 100-metre, shorter than the 111-metre of modern ISU regulations.

For most of the tournament's history, the Men's senior and Girl's senior events could only be won once by the same person. The 1958 edition, however, changed those eligibility rules for the Girl's senior class only, which allowed reigning champion Marian "Micki" Finch to return and successfully defend her 1957 crown.

A team classification existed for a decade between 1948 and 1957, which rewarded the best club based on points accrued by its competitors across the various individual races.

=== Race of Champions ===
In 1929, a special race was organized between victors of past New York Silver Skates Derbies. Contested over 1 mile, it was won by 1926 champion Irving Jaffee with a time of 3:02 2–5. Although it was initially promoted of as a one-off, that race was retroactively included in the Race of Champions' history.

When the event moved to Madison Square Garden in 1936, a new event was added to the schedule, called the "International Inter-City Race" and raced over 2 miles like the New York Silver Skates Derby itself. Pitched by the Daily News as an "Arctic World Series", it pitted the most recent New York Silver Skates champion, Joe Bree, against the reigning champions of other major Silver Skates, initially those in Boston, Chicago, Detroit and St. Louis. The winners of other tournaments were subsequently added, most notably those of Minneapolis and St. Paul, Minnesota. The Inter-City champion would return to defend his title the following year, in addition to the new champion from his region. Joe Bree won the inaugural event, although his time was actually 5 seconds slower than the 6:57.4 the New York Silver Skates winner, Cliff Spellman, who would win the Inter-City race himself in 1937. The race would later be known by the name "Championship of Champions" before settling on "Race of Champions".

As World War II and the advent of conscription prevented the gathering of current regional champions, the entry list reverted to a selection of past winners, often slanted towards New York area participants. The formula stuck after the conflict ended, with the race now billed as purely invitational, and mixing popular New York skaters with select representatives from other regions.

In 1955, a women's version of the Race of Champions was introduced, run on a shorter 3/4-mile distance. It was won by Janet Backman Tighe from the New England skating hotbed of Wilmington, with a time of 2:32.5, after local rival Jean Ashforth, who was on track for a record time, crashed when she hit a track marking block. However, the experiment was not renewed in subsequent years.

=== Qualifying ===
As the contest grew in popularity, the number of participants required preliminary rounds to be held in advance of the finals. In the outdoor days, they often took place at the same venue. Following the move to the Garden's short track, qualifications originally took place at the Ice Club (later Iceland), the arena's secondary rink. Other facilities, such as the Brooklyn Ice Palace and Flushing Meadows Ice Rink were also used over the years, as was Central Park's outdoor Wollman Rink.

=== Exhibitions ===
The event's program also featured some novelty attractions, which changed from year to year. The inaugural edition featured a time trial exhibition by 11-year-old blue chip prospect Raymond Murray. The 1936 edition featured a demonstration of barrel jumping (a precursor to ice cross) by specialist Bobby Hearn. Other numbers were performed by skating revues and some of the better North American-based figure skaters of the day, such as Maria and Otto Jelinek, Nancy and Ronald Ludington, Maribel Owen and Dudley Richards, Ronald Robertson, Hayes Alan Jenkins and Donald Jackson. Eleanor "Ellie" Sommers, who performed an exhibition during the 1956 Silver Skates, went on to play Hans Brinker's sister Trinka in NBC's adaptation the eponymous novel in 1958.

== Masters of Ceremonies ==
Between 1945 and 1955, the show's regular master of ceremony was anchorman and journalist Ed Sullivan, who had a longstanding association with the Daily News. Final editions were anchored by well-known pageant host Bob Russell.

== Trophies ==
The winner of the Men's senior Silver Skate Derby received a sculpture made of solid silver representing a pair of ice skates, as in the novel Hans Brinker, or The Silver Skates. Winners in the other NY classes received silver plated skates. First, second and third placed skaters in the Race of Champions received a gold, silver and bronze plated replica of the Victory of Samothrace, respectively. Although the team classification predates it, 1955 was the first edition to award a formal trophy to the best team.

== Winners ==
| Year | Men's Senior (18 and over) | Girls' Senior (16 and over) | Race of Champions | Team classification | Venue |
|---|---|---|---|---|---|
| 1922 | Al Leitch | Elsie Muller | Not held | No team classification | Lewisohn Stadium, New York City |
| 1923 | West Becker | Hattie Dose | Not held | No team classification | Lewisohn Stadium, New York City |
| 1924 | Paul Forsman | Dorothy Jackson | Not held | No team classification | Lewisohn Stadium, New York City |
| 1925 | Lou Morris | Caroline Breiter | Not held | No team classification | Lewisohn Stadium, New York City |
| 1926 | Irving Jaffee | Esther Zimmerman | Not held | No team classification | Conservatory Lake at Central Park, New York City |
| 1927 | Eddie Searle | Olga Fischer | Not held | No team classification | Conservatory Lake at Central Park, New York City |
| 1928 | William Casey | Lee Bertsch | Not held | No team classification | Conservatory Lake at Central Park, New York City |
| 1929 | Andy Roesch | Gene Mackie | Irving Jaffee | No team classification | Conservatory Lake at Central Park, New York City |
| 1930 | Carl Springer | Mildred Mangold | Not held | No team classification | Conservatory Lake at Central Park, New York City |
| 1931 | Herbert "Bert" Taylor | Liliane Corke | Not held | No team classification | Conservatory Lake at Central Park, New York City |
| 1932 | Cancelled due to weather conditions | | | | |
| 1933 | Cancelled due to weather conditions | | | | |
| 1934 | Joe Bree | Muriel Wilson | Not held | No team classification | Conservatory Lake at Central Park, New York City |
| 1935 | Cancelled due to weather conditions | | | | |
| 1936 | Cliff Spellman | Alice Burnham | Joe Bree | No team classification | Madison Square Garden, New York City |
| 1937 | Joe Dille | Helen Bahil | Cliff Spellman | No team classification | Madison Square Garden, New York City |
| 1938 | John Roukema | Edna Hanley | Don Johnson | No team classification | Madison Square Garden, New York City |
| 1939 | Dick Werner | Hilda Reuther | John Roukema | No team classification | Madison Square Garden, New York City |
| 1940 | Roy Erickson | Esther Williams | John Roukema | No team classification | Madison Square Garden, New York City |
| 1941 | Herman Van Putten | Virginia Jahn | Charles Leighton | No team classification | Madison Square Garden, New York City |
| 1942 | Robert Jahn | Margie Cummings | Herman Van Putten | No team classification | Madison Square Garden, New York City |
| 1943 | Ray Blum | Helen Carlesco | John Simmons | No team classification | Madison Square Garden, New York City |
| 1944 | Frank Briggs | Theresa Renton | Ray Blum | No team classification | Madison Square Garden, New York City |
| 1945 | Gilbert Swordsma | Marion Hanley | Joe Bree | No team classification | Madison Square Garden, New York City |
| 1946 | John Strasser | Norma Davis | Roy Erickson | No team classification | Madison Square Garden, New York City |
| 1947 | Henry Swordsma | Marion Davis | Ray Blum | No team classification | Madison Square Garden, New York City |
| 1948 | Al Casale | Mary Lynch | Frank Briggs | Patterson SC | Madison Square Garden, New York City |
| 1949 | Don McDermott | Myra Shapiro | Ray Blum | Patterson SC | Madison Square Garden, New York City |
| 1950 | Joe Walsh | Louise Daub | Don McDermott | Patterson SC | Madison Square Garden, New York City |
| 1951 | John Storm | Marion Tomlinson | Don McDermott | Queensbrook SC | Madison Square Garden, New York City |
| 1952 | Dick King | Caroline Crudele | Mario Trafeli, Jr. | Grossinger SC | Madison Square Garden, New York City |
| 1953 | Bill Cooney | Gloria Rattay | Edgar Dame Jr. | Norsemen SC | Madison Square Garden, New York City |
| 1954 | Arnold Uhrlass | Joan Russell | Mario Trafeli, Jr. | Flushing Meadows Speed Skating Club | Madison Square Garden, New York City |
| 1955 | Charles Russo | Lynn Finnegan | Arnold Uhrlass | Flushing Meadows Speed Skating Club | Madison Square Garden, New York City |
| 1956 | Jay Hasbrouck | Christine Markley | Kenneth LeBel | Wollman Rink SC | Madison Square Garden, New York City |
| 1957 | Robert Nelson | Marion "Micki" Finch | Arnold Uhrlass | Flushing Meadows Speed Skating Club | Madison Square Garden, New York City |
| 1958^{1} | Steve Stenson | Marion "Micki" Finch | Bill Disney | No team classification | Madison Square Garden, New York City |
| 1958^{1} | Bob Fischer | Marion "Micki" Finch | Arnold Uhrlass | No team classification | Madison Square Garden, New York City |
| 1959 | Donald Beam | Darlene Sechanic | John Walsh | No team classification | Madison Square Garden, New York City |
| 1960 | Bob McCarthy | Barbara Sulc | Arnold Uhrlass | No team classification | Madison Square Garden, New York City |

=== Footnotes ===
1. The 34th and 35th editions were both staged in the calendar year 1958, as the event moved up from January to the previous December.

== Records ==
| Event | Distance | Date | Record | Skater |
|---|---|---|---|---|
| Men's senior race | 2 miles | 8 December 1960 | 6:34.3 | Bob McCarthy |
| Girl's senior race | 660 yards^{1} | 12 January 1953 | 1:14.8 | Gloria Rattay |
| Girl's senior race | 1/2-mile^{1} | 17 December 1959 | 1:38.5 | Darlene Sechanic |
| Race of Champions | 2 miles | 8 December 1960 | 6:13.2 | Arnold Uhrlass |

=== Footnotes ===
1. The distance for the Girl's senior race fluctuated depending on the year.

== See also ==
- Silver Skates (Boston)
- Silver Skates (Chicago)
- Silver Skates (Detroit)
- Silver Skates (Minneapolis)
- Silver Skates (St. Paul)
- Silver Skates (St. Louis)
- Golden Skates (speed skating), a defunct Tri-State speed skating championship
- New York Golden Gloves, a sister competition for amateur boxers
