= Craig "Gator" Bodzianowski =

1st American Professional Boxer Competed on One Leg

Craig Bodzianowski
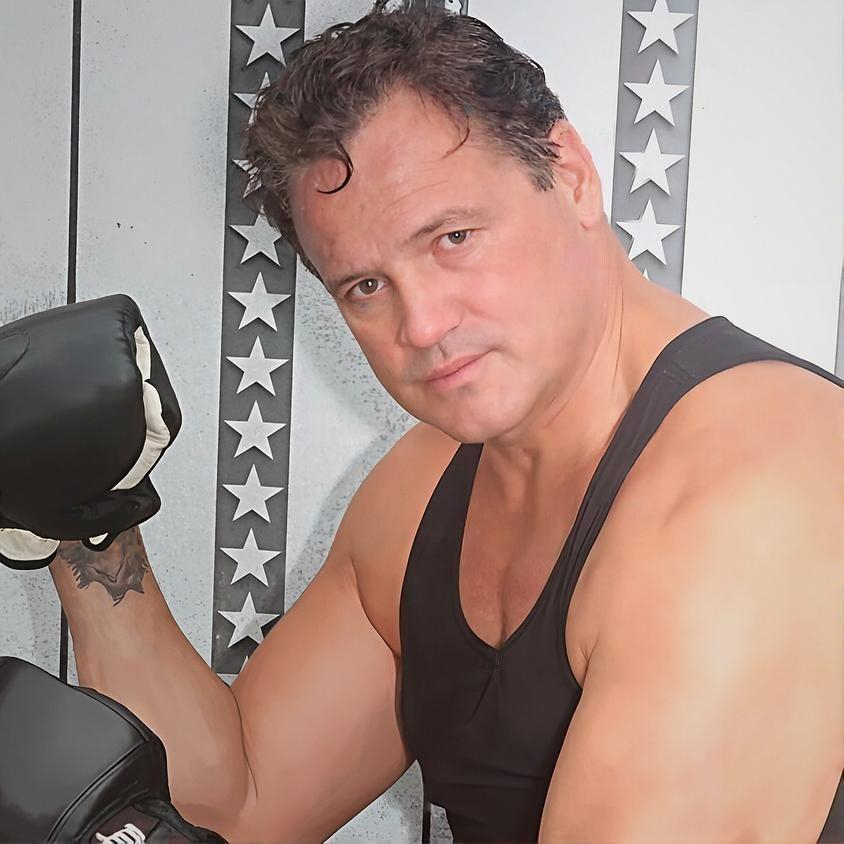

Personal information
- Nickname: Gator
- Nationality: American
- Born: Craig Steven Bodzianowski; February 7, 1961 Chicago, Illinois, U.S.
- Died: July 26, 2013 (aged 52) Tinley Park, Illinois, U.S.
- Height: 6 ft 2 in (188 cm)
- Weight: Cruiserweight

Boxing career
- Stance: Orthodox

Boxing record
- Total fights: 36
- Wins: 31
- Win by KO: 23
- Losses: 4
- Draws: 1
- No contests: 0

Craig Steven "Gator" Bodzianowski (February 7, 1961 – July 26, 2013) was an American professional boxer who competed from 1982 to 1993. He gained national recognition for his remarkable comeback after losing his right leg below the knee in a motorcycle accident. Bodzianowski remained active at the elite level of professional boxing with an artificial limb, and made world sports history in 1990 when he challenged for the WBA Cruiserweight World Title as the Americas continental champion and first American amputee to qualify to compete in what is considered one of the greatest sports comebacks of all time.

In a comparative sports critical analysis of individual-athlete comeback stories across all sports, Bodzianowski ranked No. 1, followed by swimmer Natalie du Toit at No. 2, One-handed American Baseball Player Jim Abbott at No. 3, and Olympic shooter Károly Takács at No. 4.

== Early life ==
Craig Steven "Gator" Bodzianowski was born on February 7, 1961, in Chicago, and grew up on the city's South Side and in the south suburbs. He was the son of Patrick "Pat" Bodzianowski, a former professional boxer who later worked as a tattoo artist, and Gloria L. Bodzianowski.

Bodzianowski was raised in a large, close-knit family with several brothers and sisters. His siblings included Denise Worley (Stephen), Howard (Kristen), Kenneth (Christine), William ("Billy") and Donna Tamberlin. Growing up, boxing was part of everyday life in the household. Pat Bodzianowski introduced Craig to the sport and encouraged a hard-edged work ethic; later biographical accounts describe him as instilling a "never quit" mentality that Craig carried into his amateur and professional career. Craig and his brothers reportedly boxed each other in the family dining room before he moved into organized competition in Chicago's Golden Gloves program.

During his high school years, Bodzianowski acquired the nickname "Gator" after having a small green alligator tattooed on the left side of his chest, mimicking the logo on Lacoste shirts worn by some of his classmates. The tattoo was done by his father and became a personal emblem; the "Gator" nickname followed him into his amateur and, later, professional boxing career.

From the accounts captured in the one-hour documentary Still Standing, Bodzianowski inherited his father's straightforward, gritty ethos—"do the right thing and don't take no crap from no one." He was known to have a pugnacious spirit even during his school years, where his father famously discouraged backing down from fights.

== Amateur career ==
Bodzianowski began boxing as an amateur in the light heavyweight [178-lbs] weight division, since at the time there was not a true cruiserweight division [190lb] weight division he enters into as a professional. On March 13, 1981, he won the Chicago Golden Gloves Heavyweight Championship at the Rosemont Horizon Convention Center, one of the most prestigious amateur boxing titles in the United States. Bodzianowski won the Chicago Golden Gloves Heavyweight Championship earning the right to represent Chicago in the Intercity Golden Gloves competition. At the Intercity Golden Gloves held at Madison Square Garden on April 27, 1981, he lost by decision to New York's heavyweight champion Carl "The Truth" Williams. He compiled an amateur record of 62 wins and 5 losses and was notably never knocked down during his amateur career and fought to the final round every on every match.

== Professional career ==
Bodzianowski made his professional debut in October 1982, defeating Lawrence LoPresto by first-round technical knockout. He began his career as a heavyweight before transitioning to the cruiserweight division. He won his first 13 professional fights—11 of them by knockout—emerging as one of Chicago's most exciting prospects. He was a regional favorite at local venues like the Aragon Ballroom and the International Amphitheatre.

On May 31, 1984, Bodzianowski's rising career was interrupted by a catastrophic motorcycle accident that resulted in the amputation of his right leg below the knee. After multiple surgeries, he received a probationary license from the Illinois Boxing Commission—the first ever granted to an amputee by the organization—and returned to the ring, a comeback that attracted widespread attention in the sport.

Eighteen months after the accident, in December 1985, Bodzianowski returned to professional boxing. Fighting with a prosthetic leg, he won his comeback bout with a second-round knockout of Tim Richardson in Rosemont, Illinois. His return was widely covered in national sports media, highlighting both the rarity of an amputee competing at the professional level and his determination to continue his career. In 1986, he defeated Bobby Hitz to win the Illinois State Heavyweight Title, and in 1989, captured the WBA Continental Americas Cruiserweight Title with a unanimous decision over Anthony Witherspoon—becoming the first known amputee to win a sanctioned professional boxing title.

Bodzianowski's greatest moment came on July 14, 1990, when he challenged Robert Daniels for the WBA World Cruiserweight Title in Seattle. Although he lost by unanimous decision after 12 grueling rounds, he fought through broken ribs and a swollen-shut eye, earning national admiration for his grit and courage.

He continued to fight professionally until his retirement in 1993, finishing with a career record of 31 wins. Known for having One leg and One Big Heart.

== Motorcycle accident and amputation ==
On May 31, 1984, Bodzianowski was involved in a catastrophic motorcycle accident when he collided with a car while riding at high speed. He suffered multiple compound fractures to his right leg. After several unsuccessful surgeries, doctors gave him a choice: retain a partially functional but severely damaged leg, or undergo an amputation. Bodzianowski chose amputation below the knee, motivated by a goal many considered impossible—returning to professional boxing.

After a series of medical evaluations by six physicians—including specialists retained by the Pennsylvania Athletic Commission—he received official clearance to return to professional boxing. The Illinois State Athletic Commission granted his license in December 1985, marking a historic first for an amputee in U.S. boxing.

With the help of prosthetic specialists, he began working with a carbon-fiber Flex Foot prosthetic limb custom-designed for athletic performance. His return to the sport was widely reported in national media and was seen as an extraordinary display of courage and determination.

For his return to the boxing ring, although widely known as "Gator" Bodzianowski, he was also referred to as "The One-Legged Boxer" for his unprecedented return to the professional ring with a prosthetic limb following the amputation of his right leg.

== Comeback and titles ==
Bodzianowski resumed intense training and, just 18 months after the accident, returned to the ring in December 1985, scoring a second-round knockout in his comeback fight. This bout was held in his hometown of Chicago and drew significant media coverage.

In 1986, he defeated Bobby Hitz via third-round knockout to win the Illinois State Heavyweight Championship. He continued to fight regularly, now competing with a prosthetic limb in every bout.

On March 31, 1989, Bodzianowski captured the World Boxing Association Continental Americas Cruiserweight Title with a unanimous decision victory over Anthony Witherspoon in Rosemont, Illinois. The bout was described as hard-fought, with Bodzianowski relying on relentless pressure and conditioning to outpoint his opponent over twelve rounds. The victory elevated him into world title contention and marked a historic milestone, as he became the first known amputee to win a sanctioned regional championship in professional boxing. His achievement drew coverage from major national and international outlets and positioned him for future opportunities against higher-ranked cruiserweights on the world stage.

== WBA World Title Fight ==
With a professional record of 24–3–1 and having been ranked in the top ten for over a year, Bodzianowski received a shot at the WBA Cruiserweight World Championship. On July 14, 1990, he challenged reigning champion Robert Daniels "The Preacherman" at the Seattle Kingdome in a bout arranged in part by promoter Don King, with Muhammad Ali in attendance. Daniels entered the fight with a 19–1 record and was heavily favored.

Bodzianowski began aggressively, but in the second round Daniels landed a blow that aggravated a previous rib injury, limiting Bodzianowski's ability to throw right-hand punches. Over the course of the fight, Daniels's power and mobility caused significant damage, including swelling that closed Bodzianowski's right eye. Despite his corner urging him to retire, Bodzianowski refused to quit and fought through twelve rounds. He ultimately lost by unanimous decision, but the champion was unable to score a knockdown.

Although defeated, Bodzianowski's performance drew a standing ovation from the Seattle crowd and national recognition for his resilience. Commentators noted that he completed the fight under severe physical limitations, and his effort was later cited as a source of inspiration for athletes with disabilities.

== Later career and retirement ==
Bodzianowski continued fighting in the early 1990s, adding several more wins to his record. However, repeated infections and complications from his prosthetic leg, combined with the wear and tear of a physically demanding sport, led him to retire in 1993.

He concluded his professional career with a record of 31 wins (23 by knockout), 4 losses, and 1 draw. All four of his losses came via decision, and he was never stopped or knocked out during his professional tenure—a rarity in boxing at any weight class.

== Personal life and death ==
During the late 1980s, Bodzianowski endured profound personal losses. His brother Billy died in an accidental shooting when Craig was 18. In 1990, his first manager and trainer, Bill O'Connor—who had mentored him since his amateur days—died by suicide at home.

Despite these tragedies, Bodzianowski continued to compete with determination. Observers credited his perseverance to the mental resilience shaped by his upbringing and hardships.

Following a severe motorcycle accident in May 1984 that resulted in the amputation of his right leg below the knee, Bodzianowski was fitted with a carbon-fiber "Seattle Foot" prosthetic.

His comeback drew a mix of admiration and skepticism. Among the critics was Dr. Ferdie Pacheco, former ringside physician for Muhammad Ali, who questioned the safety implications. Nonetheless, Bodzianowski's return was widely covered in the boxing press and praised as inspirational.

Bodzianowski died in his sleep on July 26, 2013, at the age of 52. His death was attributed to natural causes, and he had been in relatively good health in the years prior. His death was widely mourned, particularly within Chicago and the boxing community, where he was remembered as a respected and inspirational figure, with his career often cited as one of the most remarkable comeback stories in professional sports.

== Legacy and impact ==
Bodzianowski's career broke barriers and reshaped perceptions of what athletes with disabilities could achieve in professional sports. His return to boxing with a prosthetic limb was considered unprecedented, and his success encouraged technological innovation in athletic prosthetics, especially in impact sports.

On February 3, 1986, following Bodzianowski's return to professional boxing with a prosthetic leg, his remarkable story of recovery and determination was covered in major media outlets, such as Sports Illustrated in the article "I Want It Twice As Much" by William Nack, further elevating Bodzianowski's national profile as one of boxing's most courageous figures. The cover of the issue was "Supermen!", which highlighted the January 26, 1986, Chicago Bears victory against the New England Patriots at Super Bowl XX, featuring both Chicago sports legends in the same issue.

Also in February 1986, Bodzianowski traveled to Rome and was granted an audience with Pope John Paul II at the Vatican. The meeting was arranged in recognition of his kinetic faith, spiritual tenacity, perseverance, invincibility of will and faith, and overall triumph of the human spirit following his life-altering motorcycle accident and inspired comeback. Bodzianowski described the encounter as deeply moving and spiritually affirming.

In 2015, Bodzianowski was posthumously inducted into the Illinois Boxing Hall of Fame. He has been featured in multiple tributes, including documentaries such as The One-Legged Boxer (2022) recognized for both his professional achievements and the barrier-breaking nature of his career. He was profiled by The Sweet Science—ensuring his story has reached broader audiences beyond the boxing world with retrospectives published by boxing historians like Bernard Fernandez.

Bodzianowski is widely cited as an inspirational figure in adaptive and disability sports. His ability to return to professional boxing with a prosthetic limb shattered preconceived limits, encouraging inclusion and innovation in athletic prosthetics.

In a comparative sports critical analysis of individual-athlete comeback stories across all sports, Bodzianowski ranked No. 1, followed by swimmer Natalie du Toit at No. 2, Jim Abbott at No. 3, and Olympic shooter Károly Takács at No. 4.

His story has also been referenced in academic and motivational settings as a study in resilience and human adaptation under extreme adversity. For example, sociology discussions on the embodied nature of sport often cite his example of perseverance and overcoming physical limitations.

== Professional boxing record ==
| Result | Record | Opponent | Opponent Record | Type | Round | Date | Location | Notes |
|---|---|---|---|---|---|---|---|---|
| Win | 31–4–1 | Jordan Keepers | 1–36–2 | TKO | 1 | Dec 1993 | Union Hall, Countryside | |
| Win | 30–4–1 | Joe Brewer | 5–8–1 | TKO | 1 | Nov 1992 | Chicago, IL | |
| Win | 29–4–1 | Ed Strickland | 0–6–0 | TKO | 1 | Aug 1992 | Lexington, KY | |
| Win | 28–4–1 | James Wilder | 1–30–0 | TKO | 1 | Aug 1991 | Orland Park, IL | |
| Win | 27–4–1 | Joey Christjohn | 10–9–3 | UD | 8 | Jun 1991 | Aix-en-Provence, France | |
| Win | 26–4–1 | Mike McGrady | 6–1–0 | UD | 8 | Mar 1991 | Allauch, France | |
| Win | 25–4–1 | Oscar Holman | 10–15–2 | UD | 8 | Oct 1990 | Chicago Heights, IL | |
| Loss | 24–4–1 | Robert Daniels | 18–1–0 | UD | 12 | Jul 1990 | Seattle, WA | For WBA World Cruiserweight Title |
| Win | 24–3–1 | Bruce Johnson | 5–12–1 | KO | 2 | Mar 1990 | Chicago, IL | |
| Loss | 23–3–1 | James Warring | 9–1–0 | UD | 10 | Nov 1989 | Chicago, IL | |
| Win | 23–2–1 | Anthony Witherspoon | 19–5–0 | UD | 12 | Apr 1989 | Scranton, PA | Won WBA Continental Americas Title |
| Win | 22–2–1 | Andre Crowder | 6–7–2 | TKO | 3 | Feb 1989 | Philadelphia, PA | |
| Draw | 21–2–1 | Andre Crowder | 6–7–1 | MD | 10 | Dec 1988 | Harvey, IL | |
| Win | 21–2 | Dawud Shaw | 14–19–0 | UD | 10 | Nov 1988 | Philadelphia, PA | |
| Loss | 20–2 | Alfonzo Ratliff | 23–7–0 | UD | 10 | May 1988 | Harvey, IL | |
| Win | 20–1 | Earl Lewis | 8–5–1 | UD | 10 | Feb 1988 | Chicago Heights, IL | |
| Win | 19–1 | Al Houck | 16–17–2 | UD | 10 | Nov 1987 | Chicago, IL | Co-main event w/ Tyson exhibition |
| Win | 18–1 | Otis Bates | 11–11–2 | TKO | 3 | Aug 1987 | Chicago, IL | |
| Loss | 17–1 | Alfonzo Ratliff | 21–4–0 | UD | 10 | Apr 1987 | Chicago, IL | For Illinois State Cruiserweight Title |
| Win | 17–0 | Bobby Hitz | 8–0–0 | KO | 3 | Dec 1986 | Alsip, IL | Won Illinois State Heavyweight Title |
| Win | 16–0 | Steve Mormino | 12–7–2 | KO | 2 | Aug 1986 | Palos Heights, IL | |
| Win | 15–0 | Rick Enis | 15–8–0 | TKO | 4 | Apr 1986 | Chicago, IL | |
| Win | 14–0 | Francis Sargent | 6–11–1 | TKO | 2 | Dec 1985 | Palos Heights, IL | 1st Comeback fight after amputation |
| Win | 13–0 | Francis Sargent | 4–6–1 | TKO | 3 | May 1984 | Chicago, IL | |
| Win | 12–0 | Frank Draper | 6–9–0 | TKO | 1 | Apr 1984 | Chicago, IL | |
| Win | 11–0 | James Dixon | 17–30–2 | UD | 6 | Feb 1984 | Chicago, IL | |
| Win | 10–0 | Ron Draper | 8–27–1 | KO | 2 | Dec 1983 | Chicago, IL | |
| Win | 9–0 | Johnny Words | 6–7–0 | UD | 4 | Dec 1983 | Chicago, IL | |
| Win | 8–0 | Vernon Bridges | 3–6–1 | TKO | 1 | Nov 1983 | Chicago, IL | |
| Win | 7–0 | Leonard Brandon | 2–5–0 | KO | 2 | Aug 1983 | Chicago, IL | |
| Win | 6–0 | James Churn | 5–6–0 | TKO | 1 | Jul 1983 | Chicago, IL | |
| Win | 5–0 | Jessie Hicks | 1–1–0 | KO | 1 | May 1983 | Chicago, IL | |
| Win | 4–0 | Richard Scott | 2–0–1 | TKO | 1 | Mar 1983 | Chicago, IL | |
| Win | 3–0 | Robert Obey | 3–0–1 | TKO | 1 | Mar 1983 | Chicago, IL | |
| Win | 2–0 | Dave Townsend | 7–0–0 | UD | 6 | Jan 1983 | Chicago, IL | |
| Win | 1–0 | Lawrence LoPresto | 0–1–0 | TKO | 1 | Oct 1982 | Chicago, IL | Professional debut |

Career Record: 36 fights – 31 wins (23 KOs), 4 losses (0 KOs), 1 draw

== Career accomplishments ==
- Chicago Golden Gloves Heavyweight Champion (1981) – Compiled an amateur record of 62–5 and won one of the most prestigious amateur boxing tournaments in the United States.
- Illinois State Heavyweight Champion (1986) – Defeated Bobby Hitz by third-round knockout on December 6, 1986, to win the state title in a major post-comeback victory.
- WBA Continental Americas Cruiserweight Champion (1989) – Captured the regional title on March 31, 1989, with a unanimous decision over Anthony Witherspoon, becoming the first known amputee to win a sanctioned professional boxing title.
- WBA World Cruiserweight Title Challenger (1990) – Faced reigning world champion Robert Daniels in a 12-round title fight on July 14, 1990, going the distance in a performance that earned national admiration.
- Final Professional Record – Retired in 1993 with a record of 31 wins (23 by knockout), 4 losses (all by decision), and 1 draw. He was never knocked out in 36 career bouts.
- Illinois Boxing Hall of Fame Induction (2015) – Posthumously honored for his inspirational career and contributions to the sport of boxing in Illinois.

== In media ==
Bodzianowski's comeback and career were featured in national sports media outlets, including Sports Illustrated, the Chicago Tribune, Chicago Sun-Times and Associated Press, where his story was highlighted as both inspirational and unprecedented for an amputee athlete.

He also appeared on televised sports segments, including programs like Inside Edition and NBC Sports, where his determination and return to boxing were often framed as symbols of resilience and determination in professional athletics.

In the year 2000, Bodzianowski co-authored his biography The Tale of Gator: The Story of Craig Bodzianowski–The Boxer Who Wouldn't Stay Down with sportswriter Mike Fitzgerald. The book chronicles his amateur and professional career, the 1984 motorcycle accident that led to the amputation of his right leg, and his return to boxing. The Foreword was written by Daniel "Rudy" Ruettiger, the real-life inspiration who is celebrated for his perseverance in earning a spot on the Notre Dame football team despite overwhelming odds.

The One-Legged Boxer (2022) is a short documentary directed by Richard Poche that chronicles Bodzianowski's rise as a boxer, his accident and amputation, and his professional comeback. It features interviews with Bodzianowski and several of his opponents, including Robert Daniels, Rick Enis, Alfonzo Ratliff, and Anthony Witherspoon.

== Awards and honors ==
- Chicago Golden Gloves Heavyweight Champion (1981) – Awarded for winning the prestigious amateur boxing tournament in Chicago.
- Illinois State Heavyweight Champion (1986) – Earned by defeating Bobby Hitz via third-round knockout.
- WBA Continental Americas Cruiserweight Champion (1989) – Won the regional title by unanimous decision over Anthony Witherspoon.
- Most Courageous Athlete Award (1989), Philadelphia Sports Writers Association
- WBA World Cruiserweight Title Challenger (1990) – Official challenger for the WBA Cruiserweight World Championship against Robert Daniels.
- Inducted into the Illinois Boxing Hall of Fame (2015) – Posthumously honored for his achievements and impact on the sport of boxing.
