= Magne Havnå =

Norwegian boxer (1963–2004)

Magne Havnaa
Personal information
- Born: Magne Havnå; 16 September 1963 Risør, Norway
- Died: 29 May 2004 (aged 40) Risør, Norway
- Weight: Cruiserweight

Boxing career

Boxing record
- Total fights: 22
- Wins: 19
- Win by KO: 11
- Losses: 3
- Draws: 0

Magne Havnaa (16 September 1963 – 29 May 2004) was a Norwegian professional boxer who once held the WBO world title in cruiserweight, beating American boxer Boone Pultz in 5 rounds in May 1990. His son Kai Robin Havnaa is also a former boxer in the cruiserweight division, undefeated as a professional.

== Amateur career ==
- Club: Sentrum BK, Oslo, under legendary trainer Leif Hvalby, who was amateur champion and a sparring partner for the Danish EBU champion Christian Christensen in the 1950s and '60s.
- 1981 Scandavian Junior Amateur heavyweight champion
- 1984 Norwegian heavyweight champion
- Represented Norway as a Heavyweight at 1984 Los Angeles Olympic Games.
  - Lost to Haakan Brock (Sweden) KO by 3
- 1985 Norwegian heavyweight champion
- 1986 Norwegian heavyweight champion

== Professional career ==
After boxing in the 1984 Summer Olympics, Havnaa turned pro in 1986 (officially named Havnå at the time, but used the spelling Havnaa internationally). During his career, Havnaa had 22 professional fights with 19 wins. His first fight was a 4-round decision over the UK's Johnny Nelson, who later on also became a world champion.

== Professional boxing record ==
22 fights	19 wins	3 losses
By knockout	11	2
By decision	8	1

No.	Result	Record	Opponent	Type	Round, time	Date	Location	Notes
22	Loss	19–3	(United Kingdom) Roger McKenzie	TKO	6 (6)	1993–02–12	Randers Hallen, Randers, Denmark	
21	Win	19–2	(United States) David Jaco	TKO	4 (6)	1992–03–14	Scandinavia Hotel, Copenhagen, Denmark	
20	Win	18–2	(United States) Greg Gorrell	KO	1 (8)	1991–12–06	Copenhagen, Denmark	
19	Win	17–2	(United States) Tyrone Booze	SD	12	1991–02–15	Randers Hallen, Randers, Denmark	Retained WBO cruiserweight title
18	Win	16–2	(Argentina) Daniel Neto	UD	12	1990–12–08	Aalborg Hallen, Aalborg, North Denmark	Retained WBO cruiserweight title
17	Win	15–2	(United States) Boone Pultz	TKO	5 (12) 2:45	1990–05–17	(Denmark) Nordjyske Messecenter, Aars, Jutland	Won WBO cruiserweight title
16	Loss	14–2	(United States) Boone Pultz	SD	12	1989–12–03	Scandinavia Hotel, Copenhagen, Denmark	For vacant WBO cruiserweight title
15	Loss	14–1	(Italy) Angelo Rottoli	TKO	5 (12)	1989–05–26	Bergamo, Italy	For vacant European cruiserweight title
14	Win	14–0	(United Kingdom) Lennie Howard	TKO	3 (8)	1989–04–27	Skive Hallerne, Skive, Denmark	
13	Win	13–0	(Sierra Leone) David Muhammed	TKO	6 (8)	1989–02–16	K.B. Hallen, Copenhagen, Denmark	
12	Win	12–0	(United Kingdom) John Westgarth	PTS	8	1988–12–08	Sheraton Hotel, Copenhagen, Denmark	
11	Win	11–0	(United Kingdom) John Williams	TKO	4 (8)	1988–10–28	Brøndby Hall, Brøndby, Denmark	
10	Win	10–0	(Belgium) Yves Monsieur	PTS	8	1988–05–15	K.B. Hallen, Copenhagen, Denmark	
9	Win	9–0	(United Kingdom) Roy Smith	KO	4 (8)	1988–02–12	Helsingør Halln, Helsingør, Denmark	
8	Win	8–0	(United States) Alfonso Ratliff	PTS	8	1988–01–15	Skive Hallerne, Skive, Denmark	
7	Win	7–0	(United States) Robert Obey	KO	2 (?)	1987–10–09	Aosta, Italy	
6	Win	6–0	(United Kingdom) Andrew Gerrard	PTS	8	1987–10–02	K.B. Hallen, Copenhagen, Denmark	
5	Win	5–0	(United Kingdom) Stewart Lithgo	TKO	5 (6)	1987–03–28	K.B. Hallen, Copenhagen, Denmark	
4	Win	4–0	(Republic of Ireland) Mick Queally	TKO	4 (6)	1987–02–06	Herning Hallen, Herning, Denmark	
3	Win	3–0	(United Kingdom) Abner Blackstock	TKO	6 (6)	1986–11–21	K.B. Hallen, Copenhagen, Denmark	
2	Win	2–0	(Belgium) Eddy Vandenhouwele	PTS	4	1986–10–17	Randers Hallen, Randers, Denmark	
1	Win	1–0	(United Kingdom) Johnny Nelson	PTS	4	1986–10–03	Idrætshuset, Copenhagen, Denmark	

== Death ==
Havnaa died in May 2004 in Lindgrov in Risør Municipality in Aust-Agder county in a boat accident at the age of 40. Magne Havnå's brother Erling Havnå is one of the men convicted for participating in the NOKAS bank robbery of 2004.

== See also ==
- List of world cruiserweight boxing champions

Sporting positions
World boxing titles
Preceded by Boone Pultz	WBO cruiserweight champion May 17, 1990 – 1991; Vacated	Vacant Title next held by Tyrone Booze
