= Boone Pultz =

American professional boxer (born 1959)

Personal information
- Nationality: American
- Born: Richard Boone Pultz; November 18, 1959 (age 66)
- Weight: Cruiserweight

Boxing career
- Stance: Southpaw

Boxing record
- Total fights: 28
- Wins: 25
- Win by KO: 15
- Losses: 3

Richard Boone Pultz (born November 18, 1959) is an American former professional boxer who won the WBO Cruiserweight title in December 1989.

== Amateur career ==
Pultz who grew up in Cape St. Claire, Maryland took up boxing as a teenager after seeing a Rocky Balboa film. He won four straight Golden Gloves and Amateur Athletic Union championships before turning pro in 1982.

== Professional career ==
Pultz made his professional debut in 1982. After winning his first ten fights, Pultz fought Bernard Benton for the USBA Cruiserweight Title in Atlantic City, New Jersey on March 27, 1985, winning a decision over 12 rounds.

In 1989 the undefeated Pultz got the opportunity to fight Magne Havnå for the vacant WBO Cruiserweight title. Pultz travelled to Copenhagen and was successful, denying the Norwegian the title in a close 12 round split - decision contest.

Sixth months later Pultz again travelled to Denmark for a rematch, this time suffering his first defeat via a knockout in the 5th round.

Fresh off the defeat Pultz agreed to move up to Heavyweight and was scheduled to fight George Foreman in Nassau, Bahamas. Foreman backed out at the last minute, citing a training injury and no follow up date was offered. Pultz then took a three year layoff and never fought for a belt again.

Pultz initially retired in 1995, with a record of 23-1. However after over a decade of inactivity, a 47 year old Pultz decided to make a comeback, aiming to win the Heavyweight world title. Pultz initially had success, beating two journeymen opponents, but succumbed to two defeats in a row and nearing his 50th birthday fought for the last time in 2008.

== See also ==
- List of world cruiserweight boxing champions

Sporting positions
Regional boxing titles
Preceded by Bernard Benton	USBA Cruiserweight champion March 27, 1985 – 1987; Vacated	Vacant Title next held by Sherman Griffin
World boxing titles
Inaugural champion	WBO Cruiserweight champion December 3, 1989 – May 17, 1990	Succeeded by Magne Havnå
