= Gary Mason (boxer) =

Jamaican heavyweight boxer

Personal information
- Nationality: Jamaican; British
- Born: Gary Anthony Mason; 15 December 1962 Jamaica
- Died: 6 January 2011 (aged 48) Wallington, London, England
- Height: 6 ft 1 1/2 in (1.87 m)
- Weight: Heavyweight

Boxing career
- Stance: Orthodox

Boxing record
- Total fights: 38
- Wins: 37
- Win by KO: 34
- Losses: 1

Gary Mason (15 December 1962 – 6 January 2011) was a Jamaican-British professional boxer. At regional level, he held the British heavyweight title from 1989 to 1991; and challenged once for the European title in 1991.

== Professional career ==
Mason fought 38 times as a professional in a career that spanned 10 years from 1984 to 1994, with 37 wins (34 by knockout) and only one loss, that being to Lennox Lewis when he challenged for the European title in 1991. Mason gave Lewis his hardest fight up to that point in his career.

Mason defeated a number of well known heavyweights, including Tyrell Biggs, James Tillis, Alfonzo Ratliff, Ricky Parkey, James Pritchard, Hughroy Currie and David Jaco.

Mason sparred with the former WBA cruiserweight number one and British heavyweight champion David Pearce. Pearce helped him with sparring in preparation for Mason's title fights, he praised Pearce and said he was instrumental in his helping his career.

He suffered a detached retina in a bout with Everett Martin in 1990. After a short retirement he staged a comeback, which ended with a TKO defeat by Lennox Lewis, which aggravated Mason's eye injury. He came back once again, but after winning two fights in the US he retired for good.

== Rugby ==
=== Club career ===
Mason played three rugby league matches for the London Crusaders (now London Broncos), scoring a try in his first game. Mason also played in occasional football matches as part of an 'Arsenal Celebrities' team at the old Highbury football ground in North London.

== Television appearances ==
Mason appeared in a special celebrity show of Gladiators that raised money for charity in 1993 which John Fashanu won. Mason also appeared on the panel of the ITV show You Bet!, and the second episode of the first series of GamesMaster in 1992 playing Sonic Blast Man arcade. Mason's home was also one of those featured on the panel show Through the Keyhole.

== Death ==
On the morning of 6 January 2011 Mason died after being hit by a van in Sandy Lane South, Wallington, South London whilst cycling. He was pronounced dead at the scene.

== Professional boxing record ==
38 fights	37 wins	1 loss
By knockout	34	1
By decision	3	0

No.	Result	Record	Opponent	Type	Round, time	Date	Location	Notes
38	Win	37–1	Martin Foster	TKO	3 (10), 0:53	10 Sep 1994	Flamingo Hilton, Laughlin, Nevada, US	
37	Win	36–1	Kevin P Porter	TKO	2 (10), 2:58	29 Jan 1994	UND Sports Center, Grand Forks, North Dakota, US	
36	Loss	35–1	Lennox Lewis	TKO	7 (12), 0:44	6 Mar 1991	Wembley Arena, London, England	Lost British heavyweight title; For European heavyweight title
35	Win	35–0	James Pritchard	TKO	9 (10), 2:09	12 Dec 1990	Royal Albert Hall, London, England	
34	Win	34–0	Everett Martin	PTS	10	14 Mar 1990	Royal Albert Hall, London, England	
33	Win	33–0	Mark Anthony Wills	PTS	10	6 Dec 1989	Wembley Arena, London, England	
32	Win	32–0	Tyrell Biggs	KO	7 (10), 3:00	4 Oct 1989	Royal Albert Hall, London, England	
31	Win	31–0	Jess Harding	KO	1 (12), 0:30	28 Jun 1989	International Centre, Brentwood, England	Retained British heavyweight title
30	Win	30–0	Terry Armstrong	KO	3 (10)	29 Mar 1989	Wembley Grand Hall, London, England	
29	Win	29–0	Hughroy Currie	KO	4 (12), 3:00	18 Jan 1989	Royal Albert Hall, London, England	Won vacant British heavyweight title
28	Win	28–0	James Tillis	TKO	5 (10), 1:50	30 Nov 1988	Elephant & Castle Centre, London, England	
27	Win	27–0	David Jaco	TKO	4 (10), 2:52	24 Oct 1988	Blazers Nightclub, Windsor, England	
26	Win	26–0	Manoel De Almeida	TKO	7 (10)	13 Apr 1988	York Hall, London, England	
25	Win	25–0	Ricky Parkey	TKO	1 (10), 2:47	9 Mar 1988	Wembley Grand Hall, London, England	
24	Win	24–0	Alfonzo Ratliff	TKO	6 (10), 1:17	3 Feb 1988	Wembley Grand Hall, London, England	
23	Win	23–0	Sammy Scaff	TKO	2 (8)	3 Dec 1987	Cliff's Pavilion, Southend-on-Sea, England	
22	Win	22–0	Andrew Gerrard	TKO	6 (8)	24 Oct 1987	White Hart Lane, London, England	
21	Win	21–0	Andre van den Oetelaar	KO	2 (8)	25 Sep 1987	Cliff's Pavilion, Southend-on-Sea, England	
20	Win	20–0	Eddie Richardson	TKO	7 (8)	30 Aug 1987	Plaza de Toros, Marbella, Spain	
19	Win	19–0	Billy Joe Thomas	TKO	2 (8)	26 May 1987	Wembley Arena, London, England	
18	Win	18–0	Woody Clark	TKO	2 (8), 2:39	18 Apr 1987	Royal Albert Hall, London, England	
17	Win	17–0	Richard Scott	TKO	1 (8), 1:27	24 Mar 1987	Wembley Arena, London, England	
16	Win	16–0	Rodney Smith	TKO	1 (8), 1:04	22 Feb 1987	Wembley Grand Hall, London, England	
15	Win	15–0	Oscar Holman	PTS	8	26 Nov 1986	Civic Hall, Wolverhampton, England	
14	Win	14–0	Donnie Long	KO	1 (8), 1:31	4 Nov 1986	Wembley Arena, London, England	
13	Win	13–0	Lorenzo Boyd	KO	2 (8)	17 Sep 1986	Royal Albert Hall, London, England	
12	Win	12–0	Mark Young	KO	5 (8)	19 Jul 1986	Wembley Stadium, London, England	
11	Win	11–0	Ivy Brown	KO	2 (8)	20 May 1986	Wembley Arena, London, England	
10	Win	10–0	Maurice Gomis	TKO	3 (8), 1:17	24 Apr 1986	York Hall, London, England	
9	Win	9–0	Louis Pergaud	RTD	4 (8), 3:00	9 Apr 1986	Royal Albert Hall, London, England	
8	Win	8–0	Charles Hostetter	TKO	1 (8), 2:35	4 Mar 1986	Wembley Arena, London, England	
7	Win	7–0	Denroy Bryan	KO	1 (6), 1:20	19 Feb 1986	Royal Albert Hall, London, England	
6	Win	6–0	Steve Gee	TKO	5 (6), 1:25	4 Dec 1985	Royal Albert Hall, London, England	
5	Win	5–0	Steve Gee	TKO	5 (6), 1:38	5 Nov 1985	Wembley Arena, London, England	
4	Win	4–0	Luc Goossens	KO	1 (6), 2:33	6 Mar 1985	Royal Albert Hall, London, England	
3	Win	3–0	Frank Robinson	TKO	1 (6)	18 Jan 1985	York Hall, London, England	
2	Win	2–0	Al Malcolm	TKO	2 (6), 0:20	14 Dec 1984	Wembley Conference Centre, London, England	
1	Win	1–0	Al Malcolm	KO	1 (6)	16 Oct 1984	Royal Albert Hall, London, England	

Sporting positions
Regional boxing titles
Vacant Title last held by Horace Notice	British heavyweight champion 18 January 1989 – 6 March 1991	Succeeded by Lennox Lewis
