= Roberto Durán vs. Vinny Pazienza =

Boxing match

Mano a Mano
- Date: June 25, 1994
- Venue: MGM Grand Garden Arena, Paradise, Nevada, U.S.
- Title(s) on the line: Vacant IBC super middleweight title

Tale of the tape
Boxer	Roberto Durán	Vinny Pazienza
Nickname	Manos de Piedra ("Hands of Stone")	The Pazmanian Devil
Hometown	Panama City, Panama Province, Panama	Cranston, Rhode Island, U.S.
Purse	$500,000	$500,000
Pre-fight record	92–9 (64 KO)	37–5 (27 KO)
Age	43 years	31 years, 6 months
Height	5 ft 7 1/2 in (171 cm)	5 ft 7 1/2 in (171 cm)
Weight	163 1/2 lb (74 kg)	165 lb (75 kg)
Style	Orthodox	Orthodox
Recognition	WBC/WBA; No. 8 Ranked Super Middleweight; IBF; No. 9 Ranked Super Middleweight; 4-division world champion	WBC; No. 5 Ranked Super Middleweight; WBA; No. 9 Ranked Super Middleweight; 2-division world champion

Result
- Pazienza wins via unanimous decision (117-113, 117-112, 117-112)

Roberto Durán vs. Vinny Pazienza, billed as Mano a Mano, was a professional boxing match contested on June 25, 1994, for the vacant IBC super middleweight title.

== Background ==
A fight between 4-division world champion Roberto Durán and 2-division world champion had been in the works for over a year. Pazienza had returned to boxing in December 1992 after a 13-month absence while he recovered from a broken neck he suffered in a near-fatal car crash in November 1991. After winning the first two fights of his comeback, Pazienza and his promoter and manager Dan Duva entered negotiations with the 43-year old Durán for a potential June 1993 fight after which Pazienza planned to challenge for one of the major middleweight titles, but talks stalled and Pazienza was forced to take on former welterweight champion Lloyd Honeyghan, whom he knocked out in the tenth round. Durán instead fought journeyman Jacques LeBlanc two days after the Pazienza-Honeyghan fight and when asked at a conference call about his rumored fight with Pazienza, Durán angrily replied "If Pazienza is man enough to fight Roberto Duran, then tell him to sign a contract once and for all and stop wasting time. If Vinny Pazienza wants to fight for a title at 160 pounds he has to beat me first. If he can't beat me, he doesn't deserve to fight for a title." Finally, after months of negotiations and Pazienza replacing Duva as his manager with Bill Cayton, the two fighters came to an agreement in March 1994 to face one another in June that same year. Though Pazienza had been fighting at middleweight the year prior, the fight was fought in the super middleweight division (where Durán had been fighting since his 1991 return) with a catchweight of 165 pounds.

Though the 43-year old Durán had fought only journeymen fighters since returning to boxing in 1991 (losing his first fight to Pat Lawlor and then going 7-0 since), there was considerable hype for the fight with the MGM Grand Garden Arena paying a $1.3 million site fee and HBO's pay-per-view division TVKO giving both fighters not only a $500,000 payday, but a percentage of the pay-per-view sales as well.

There was a considerable amount of trash talk from both fighters prior to the bout with Pazienza openly expressing his dislike of Durán stating "I've grown to hate him over the months." and "once a quitter, always a quitter" referring to Durán's infamous second Sugar Ray Leonard fight in which he quit by saying no más. Durán, meanwhile, vowed that he would target Pazienza's surgically repaired neck.

Originally, the fight was to take place in Atlantic City but the venue was switched to the MGM Grand Garden Arena, with the casino-hotel serving as the sole promoter of the bout.

== The fight ==
The fight would go the 12-round distance with Pazienza winning by relatively lopsided unanimous decision with two scores of 117–112 and one score of 117–113. The decision was somewhat controversial as many had the fight closer than what the judges scorecards showed. Notably, all three judges scored the fifth round a 10–10 draw despite Durán scoring a knockdown after dropping Pazienza with a right hand though Pazienza would quickly rise and answer the referee's 8-count. Later in the round, an accidental headbutt opened up a cut above Pazienza's right eye that continued to bleed as the fight went on, but did not seem to bother his vision. Durán had gotten off to decent start but tired as the fight went on and Pazienza was able to control much of the fight during the later rounds.

HBO's unofficial scorer Harold Lederman scored the fight 117-112 for Pazienza.

== Aftermath ==
After the fight, Pazienza admitted that he had not performed as well as he hoped stating "I thought I would beat him easier. I was a little off." Durán, however, insisted he had been robbed of a victory retorting "If this kid's so tough, look at his face and look at me. I didn't lose the fight."

== Fight card ==
Confirmed bouts:

Weight Class	Weight		vs.		Method	Round	Notes
Super Middleweight	168 lbs.	Vinny Pazienza	def.	Roberto Durán	UD	12/12	^{Note 1}
Welterweight	147 lbs.	Tony Lopez	def.	Greg Haugen	TKO	10/10
Heavyweight	200+ lbs.	Jorge Luis González	def.	Mike Evans	KO	2/10
Light Middlweight	154 lbs.	Ray Lovato	def.	Pat Briceno	TKO	3/8
Heavyweight	200+ lbs.	Jonathan Grant	def.	Obed Sullivan	UD	4/4

^Note 1 For IBC Super Middleweight title

== Broadcasting ==
Country	Broadcaster
United States	HBO

Preceded by vs. Terry Thomas	Roberto Durán's bouts 25 June 1994	Succeeded by vs. Heath Todd
Preceded by vs. Jacques LeBlanc	Vinny Pazienza's bouts 25 June 1994	Succeeded by vs. Rafael Williams
