= Rickey Parkey =

American boxer (1956–2024)

Personal information
- Born: Rickey Parkey; November 7, 1956 Morristown, Tennessee, U.S.
- Died: April 7, 2024 (aged 67)
- Height: 6 ft 0 in (183 cm)
- Weight: Cruiserweight

Boxing career
- Reach: 73 in (185 cm)
- Stance: Orthodox

Boxing record
- Total fights: 42
- Wins: 22
- Win by KO: 16
- Losses: 20

Ricky Parkey (November 7, 1956 – April 7, 2024) was an American professional boxer who held the IBF cruiserweight title from 1986 to 1987.

== Professional career ==
Parkey turned professional in 1981 and won the IBF cruiserweight title with a TKO win over Lee Roy Murphy in 1986. He defended the belt once before losing the title to Evander Holyfield via TKO the following year in a title unification bout. He retired in 1994.

Parkey died on April 7, 2024, at the age of 67.

== Professional boxing record ==
42 fights	22 wins	20 losses
By knockout	16	11
By decision	6	9

No.	Result	Record	Opponent	Type	Round, time	Date	Location	Notes
42	Loss	22–20	Christophe Bizot	TKO	4	May 7, 1994	Levallois-Perret, France	
41	Loss	22–19	Mark Hulstrom	PTS	6	Apr 22, 1994	Aalborghallen, Aalborg, Denmark	
40	Loss	22–18	Mario Schiesser	TKO	5	Feb 5, 1994	Deutschlandhalle, Charlottenburg, Germany	
39	Loss	22–17	Akim Tafer	PTS	8	Jun 24, 1993	Velodrome du Lac, Bordeaux, France	
38	Loss	22–16	Aleksandr Miroshnichenko	KO	3	Mar 20, 1993	Philips Halle, Düsseldorf, Germany	
37	Loss	22–15	Kenny Keene	UD	10	Feb 27, 1993	O'Connor Field House, Caldwell, Idaho, U.S.	
36	Loss	22–14	Nathaniel Fitch	TKO	5	Oct 24, 1992	King Street Palace, Charleston, South Carolina, U.S.	
35	Loss	22–13	Axel Schulz	PTS	8	Oct 2, 1992	Deutschlandhalle, Charlottenburg, Germany	
34	Loss	22–12	Kimmuel Odum	MD	8	Aug 1, 1992	Ohio Center, Columbus, Ohio, U.S.	
33	Loss	22–11	Alexander Zolkin	TKO	10	Apr 10, 1992	Ohio Center, Columbus, Ohio, U.S.	
32	Loss	22–10	Anaclet Wamba	KO	8	Apr 4, 1992	Levallois-Perret, France	
31	Loss	22–9	Dwight Muhammad Qawi	RTD	8	Nov 7, 1991	Grand Hyatt, Washington, D.C., U.S.	WBC Continental Americas Cruiserweight Title
30	Win	22–8	Eddie Taylor	TKO	6	Dec 7, 1990	Target Center, Minneapolis, Minnesota, U.S.	Won WBF Cruiserweight Title
29	Win	21–8	Charles Dixon	KO	5	Nov 16, 1990	Chattanooga, Tennessee, U.S.	
28	Loss	20–8	Alfonso Ratliff	KO	7	Aug 12, 1988	Eagles Club, Milwaukee, Wisconsin, U.S.	USBA Cruiserweight Title
27	Loss	20–7	Gary Mason	TKO	1	Mar 9, 1988	Grand Hall, Wembley, England, U.K.	
26	Loss	20–6	Johnny du Plooy	KO	10	Oct 31, 1987	Superbowl, Sun City, South Africa	
25	Loss	20–5	Evander Holyfield	TKO	3	May 15, 1987	Caesars Palace, Paradise, Nevada, U.S.	Lost IBF title, for WBA Cruiserweight Title
24	Win	20–4	Chisanda Mutti	TKO	12	Mar 28, 1987	Palazzo Dello Sport, Lido di Camaiore, Italy	Retained IBF Cruiserweight Title
23	Win	19–4	Lee Roy Murphy	TKO	10	Oct 25, 1986	Palazzo Dello Sport, Marsala, Italy	Won IBF Cruiserweight Title
22	Win	18–4	Carlos Hernandez	TKO	7	Jan 28, 1986	Tropicana Hotel & Casino, Atlantic City, New Jersey, U.S.	
21	Win	17–4	Michael Arms	UD	12	Sep 10, 1985	Tropicana Hotel & Casino, Atlantic City, New Jersey, U.S.	WBC Continental Americas Cruiserweight Title
20	Loss	16–4	Eddie Mustafa Muhammad	UD	10	Jun 18, 1985	Atlantic City, New Jersey, U.S.	
19	Win	16–3	Bobby Crabtree	TKO	1	Apr 23, 1985	Tropicana Hotel & Casino, Atlantic City, New Jersey, U.S.	
18	Win	15–3	Broderick Mason	TKO	1	Dec 11, 1984	Tropicana Hotel & Casino, Atlantic City, New Jersey, U.S.	
17	Win	14–3	Renaldo Snipes	SD	10	Oct 30, 1984	Tropicana Hotel & Casino, Atlantic City, New Jersey, U.S.	
16	Loss	13–3	Bernard Benton	PTS	12	Sep 11, 1984	Tropicana Hotel & Casino, Atlantic City, New Jersey, U.S.	USBA Cruiserweight Title
15	Win	13–2	Keith Wilson	KO	1	May 20, 1984	Hickory, North Carolina, U.S.	
14	Win	12–2	Pat Cuillo	PTS	8	Jan 11, 1984	The Claridge Hotel, Atlantic City, New Jersey, U.S.	
13	Win	11–2	Stanley Ross	UD	8	Nov 15, 1983	Tropicana Hotel & Casino, Atlantic City, New Jersey, U.S.	
12	Win	10–2	Phil Clinard	PTS	8	Jun 25, 1983	Pennington Gap, Virginia, U.S.	
11	Win	9–2	Anthony Phillips	KO	3	May 26, 1983	2001/VIP, Knoxville, Tennessee, U.S.	
10	Win	8–2	Kemper Morton	KO	4	Mar 12, 1983	Raceland High School Gym, Raceland, Kentucky, U.S.	
9	Win	7–2	Keith Allen	KO	4	Feb 4, 1983	Golden Gloves Arena, Knoxville, Tennessee, U.S.	
8	Loss	6–2	Bobby Jennings	PTS	8	Jan 13, 1983	Viking Hall, Bristol, Tennessee, U.S.	
7	Win	6–1	Keith Allen	PTS	6	Jan 8, 1983	Pennington Gap High School, Pennington Gap, Virginia, U.S.	
6	Win	5–1	Maurice Moore	KO	4	Oct 16, 1982	Coliseum, Charlotte, North Carolina, U.S.	
5	Win	4–1	Frankie Hines	KO	3	Aug 27, 1982	Viking Hall, Bristol, Tennessee, U.S.	
4	Win	3–1	Tim Johnson	KO	1	Jul 8, 1982	Civic Coliseum, Knoxville, Tennessee, U.S.	
3	Loss	2–1	James Smith	PTS	6	Jan 30, 1982	Golden Gloves Arena, Knoxville, Tennessee, U.S.	
2	Win	2–0	Miles Prince	KO	5	Nov 27, 1981	Civic Coliseum, Knoxville, Tennessee, U.S.	
1	Win	1–0	Phil Clinard	KO	2	Oct 24, 1981	Talley Ward Recreation Center, Morristown, Tennessee, U.S.	

== See also ==
- List of world cruiserweight boxing champions

Sporting positions
World boxing titles
Preceded by Lee Roy Murphy	IBF cruiserweight champion October 25, 1986 – May 15, 1987	Succeeded by Evander Holyfield
