= Spanish Golden Gloves =

Boxing competitions

The Spanish Golden Gloves was a boxing tournament sponsored by El Diario La Prensa in the New York Metropolitan Area and sanctioned by the Amateur Athletic Union (AAU).

Notable winners include:

- Chris Eubank
- Joe Cortez
- José Torres
- Kevin Kelley
- Michael Bentt

== See also ==
- Golden Gloves
