= Adílson Rodrigues =

Brazilian boxer (1958–2024)

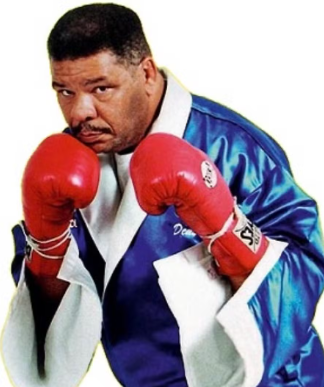

Personal information
- Nickname: Maguila
- Born: José Adílson Rodrigues dos Santos; 12 June 1958 Aracaju, Sergipe, Brazil
- Died: 24 October 2024 (aged 66) São Paulo, São Paulo, Brazil
- Height: 6 ft 1 in (1.85 m)
- Weight: Heavyweight

Boxing career
- Reach: 72 in (183 cm)
- Stance: Orthodox

Boxing record
- Total fights: 85
- Wins: 77
- Win by KO: 61
- Losses: 7
- Draws: 1

José Adílson Rodrigues dos Santos (12 June 1958 – 24 October 2024) was a Brazilian professional boxer. He scored 61 knockouts with 43 of those coming under 5 rounds. His nickname in Brazil, Maguila, came from the cartoon Magilla Gorilla.

Rodrigues was a World Boxing Federation (WBF) heavyweight champion, a World Boxing Council (WBC) Continental Americas Heavyweight champion, and held the South American title for 14 straight years, from 1986 to 2000.

== Death ==
Rodrigues died in São Paulo on 24 October 2024, at the age of 66, after 28 days of treatment for pneumonia and abdominal pain. He had been diagnosed with chronic traumatic encephalopathy in 2013.

== Professional boxing record ==
	77 Wins (61 knockouts, 16 decisions), 7 Losses (7 knockouts, 0 decisions), 1 Draw							
No.	Result	Record	Opponent	Type	Round	Date	Location	Notes
85	Loss	77-7-1	(Brazil) Daniel Frank	KO	4	29/02/2000	São Paulo, Brazil	
84	Draw	77-6-1	(Argentina) Juan Antonio Diaz	PTS	10	17/01/1999	São Paulo, Brazil	
83	Win	77-6	(Argentina) Alberto Toribio Coman	TKO	9	19/09/1998	Palmas, Brazil	
82	Loss	76-6	(Argentina) Pedro Daniel Franco	TKO	9	23/05/1998	Punta del Este, Uruguay	WBA Fedelatin Heavyweight Title.
81	Win	76-5	(United States) Bilal Muhammad	TKO	4	28/03/1998	Itapevi, Brazil	
80	Win	75-5	(United States) Francisco Harris	TKO	5	14/02/1998	Cubatão, Brazil	
79	Win	74-5	(United States) Tommy Mucciogrosso	TKO	3	13/12/1997	Caninde de Sao Francisco, Brazil	
78	Win	73-5	(Mexico) Salvador Maciel	TKO	1	09/11/1997	São Paulo, Brazil	
77	Win	72-5	(United States) Isaac Poole	KO	3	27/09/1997	Campina Grande, Brazil	
76	Win	71-5	(Argentina) Luis Alberto Musa Pereyra	KO	1	31/08/1997	Cuiabá, Brazil	
75	Win	70-5	(Argentina) Alberto Valerio Jorge Arias	KO	2	27/07/1997	Suzano, Brazil	
74	Win	69-5	(Argentina) Pedro Llaneza	KO	4	21/06/1997	Jundiai, Brazil	
73	Win	68-5	(Argentina) Ricardo Alfredo Ibarra	TKO	6	22/12/1996	São Paulo, Brazil	WBA Fedelatin Heavyweight Title.
72	Win	67-5	(Mexico) Salvador Maciel	TKO	3	08/09/1996	São Paulo, Brazil	IBF Latin American Heavyweight Title.
71	Win	66-5	(United States) Cleveland Woods	PTS	10	07/07/1996	São Paulo, Brazil	
70	Win	65-5	(Canada) Dave Fiddler	KO	3	18/05/1996	Araraquara, Brazil	WBF Heavyweight Title.
69	Win	64-5	(United Kingdom) Johnny Nelson	UD	12	03/12/1995	São Paulo, Brazil	WBF Heavyweight Title.
68	Win	63-5	(Argentina) Ricardo Alfredo Ibarra	KO	2	28/10/1995	Foz do Iguaçu, Brazil	
67	Win	62-5	(Brazil) Porfirio Rosa	KO	2	09/10/1995	São Paulo, Brazil	
66	Win	61-5	(United Kingdom) Johnny Nelson	PTS	12	22/08/1995	São Paulo, Brazil	WBF Heavyweight Title.
65	Win	60-5	(United States) Stan White Johnson	KO	2	02/07/1995	São Paulo, Brazil	
64	Win	59-5	(United States) Jason Waller	TKO	3	16/05/1995	Osasco, Brazil	
63	Loss	58-5	(United States) Mike Ronay Evans	KO	7	07/03/1995	Santos, Brazil	
62	Win	58-4	(United States) Mike Perkins	KO	1	26/01/1995	Recife, Brazil	
61	Win	57-4	(Kazakhstan) Nikolay Kulpin	UD	10	11/12/1994	Embu-Guaçu, Brazil	
60	Win	56-4	(United States) Jerry Jones	TKO	2	22/10/1994	São Paulo, Brazil	
59	Win	55-4	(United States) Terry Davis	KO	2	06/08/1994	Guaruja, Brazil	
58	Win	54-4	(Argentina) Daniel Eduardo Neto	TKO	8	18/06/1994	Mauá, Brazil	South American Heavyweight Title.
57	Win	53-4	(Brazil) Gilton Dos Santos	TKO	9	14/05/1994	São Paulo, Brazil	Brazil Heavyweight Title.
56	Win	52-4	(United States) Dan Ramsey	TKO	2	26/03/1994	Paranavaí, Brazil	
55	Win	51-4	(United States) Mark Young	TKO	7	27/11/1993	Aracaju, Brazil	
54	Win	50-4	(United States) Mike Cohen	TKO	1	30/10/1993	Cajamar, Brazil	
53	Win	49-4	(Argentina) Julio Abel Gonzalez	TKO	4	25/09/1993	São Sebastião, Brazil	South American Heavyweight Title.
52	Win	48-4	(Brazil) Manoel De Almeida	TKO	6	28/08/1993	Bragança Paulista, São Paulo, Brazil	Brazil Heavyweight Title.
51	Win	47-4	(United States) David Jaco	UD	10	31/07/1993	São Paulo, Brazil	
50	Win	46-4	(Argentina) Mario Oscar Melo	TKO	7	26/06/1993	São Paulo, Brazil	South American Heavyweight Title.
49	Win	45-4	(Paraguay) Victor Luis Britos Samudio	KO	4	22/05/1993	São Paulo, Brazil	
48	Win	44-4	(Argentina) Jorge Alfredo Dascola	RTD	5	09/12/1992	Foz do Iguaçu, Brazil	South American Heavyweight Title.
47	Win	43-4	(Argentina) Jorge Guido Cambiaso	KO	10	18/09/1992	Cruz Alta, Brazil	
46	Win	42-4	(Canada) Gordon Racette	KO	7	13/06/1992	São Paulo, Brazil	
45	Win	41-4	(Argentina) Juan Antonio Diaz	UD	12	25/04/1992	Osasco, Brazil	South American Heavyweight Title.
44	Win	40-4	(Chile) Miguel Cea	TKO	5	13/12/1991	Brasília, Brazil	South American Heavyweight Title.
43	Win	39-4	(Brazil) Edemilson Tomacio	KO	5	06/09/1991	Araguari, Brazil	Brazil Heavyweight Title.
42	Win	38-4	(United States) Angel Amarilla Garcia	KO	4	22/08/1991	Recife, Brazil	South American Heavyweight Title.
41	Win	37-4	(Argentina) Daniel Eduardo Guibaudo	TKO	3	27/07/1991	Maringá, Brazil	South American Heavyweight Title.
40	Loss	36-4	(United States) George Foreman	KO	2	16/06/1990	(United States) Paradise, Nevada, U.S.	Rodrigues knocked out at 2:39 of the second round.
39	Win	36-3	(Argentina) Walter Armando Masseroni	DQ	10	08/12/1989	São Paulo, Brazil	South American Heavyweight Title.
38	Loss	35-3	(United States) Evander Holyfield	KO	2	15/07/1989	(United States) Stateline, Nevada, U.S.	WBC Continental Americas Heavyweight Title. Rodrigues knocked out at 1:29 of the second round.
37	Win	35-2	(United States) Mike Rouse	PTS	10	22/05/1989	Blumenau, Brazil	
36	Win	34-2	(United States) James Tillis	UD	10	20/03/1989	Toledo, Brazil	
35	Win	33-2	(United States) Sammy Scaff	KO	2	18/12/1988	Belo Horizonte, Brazil	
34	Win	32-2	(United States) Mark Lee	KO	1	14/10/1988	(United States) Paradise, Nevada, U.S.	Lee knocked out at 2:34 of the first round.
33	Win	31-2	(United Kingdom) Hughroy Currie	TKO	8	14/08/1988	Londrina, Brazil	
32	Win	30-2	(United Kingdom) Dave Garside	TKO	3	12/06/1988	São Paulo, Brazil	
31	Win	29-2	(Argentina) Jorge Guido Cambiaso	KO	7	14/03/1988	Porto Alegre, Brazil	South American Heavyweight Title.
30	Win	28-2	(Uruguay) Alfredo Evangelista	PTS	10	20/12/1987	Rio de Janeiro, Brazil	
29	Win	27-2	(United States) Reggie Gross	PTS	10	11/10/1987	Araraquara, Brazil	
28	Win	26-2	(United States) James Smith	SD	10	09/08/1987	São Paulo, Brazil	
27	Win	25-2	(United States) Mike Jameson	PTS	10	21/06/1987	São Paulo, Brazil	
26	Win	24-2	(United States) Lorenzo Boyd	KO	2	31/05/1987	Curitiba, Brazil	
25	Win	23-2	(Spain) Felipe Rodriguez	TKO	8	15/03/1987	São Paulo, Brazil	
24	Win	22-2	(United States) Rocky Sekorski	PTS	12	21/12/1986	São Paulo, Brazil	WBC Continental Americas Heavyweight Title.
23	Win	21-2	(United States) Melvin Epps	PTS	10	05/10/1986	São Paulo, Brazil	
22	Win	20-2	(Netherlands) Andre van den Oetelaar	KO	3	27/07/1986	São Paulo, Brazil	
21	Win	19-2	(Argentina) Walter Daniel Falconi	KO	7	18/05/1986	São Paulo, Brazil	South American Heavyweight Title.
20	Win	18-2	(Turkey) Vedat Akova	TKO	3	02/03/1986	São Paulo, Brazil	
19	Loss	18-1	(Netherlands) Andre van den Oetelaar	KO	5	17/11/1985	Sorocaba, Brazil	
18	Win	17-1	(Belgium) Albert Syben	KO	6	06/10/1985	São Paulo, Brazil	
17	Win	16-1	(Uganda) Peter Mulindwa Kozza	KO	2	03/08/1985	São Paulo, Brazil	
16	Win	15-1	(United States) Nate Robinson	KO	1	09/06/1985	São Paulo, Brazil	
15	Loss	14-1	(Argentina) Walter Daniel Falconi	KO	3	30/03/1985	Rio de Janeiro, Brazil	
14	Win	14-0	(United States) Walter Santemore	TKO	5	10/02/1985	São Paulo, Brazil	
13	Win	13-0	(Cameroon) Louis Pergaud	KO	9	16/12/1984	São Paulo, Brazil	
12	Win	12-0	(Germany) George Butzbach	TKO	3	28/10/1984	São Paulo, Brazil	
11	Win	11-0	(Argentina) Juan Antonio Figueroa	KO	1	09/09/1984	São Paulo, Brazil	South American Heavyweight Title.
10	Win	10-0	(Cameroon) Louis Pergaud	TKO	5	29/07/1984	São Paulo, Brazil	
9	Win	9-0	(United States) Mike White	PTS	10	13/05/1984	Londrina, Brazil	
8	Win	8-0	(Argentina) Juan Antonio Musladino	KO	6	08/04/1984	São Paulo, Brazil	
7	Win	7-0	(Argentina) Domingo D'Elia	TKO	8	05/02/1984	São Paulo, Brazil	
6	Win	6-0	(Argentina) Marcos Antonio Tosto	KO	1	12/09/1983	São Paulo, Brazil	
5	Win	5-0	(Brazil) Eduardo Oliveira	KO	2	15/08/1983	São Paulo, Brazil	
4	Win	4-0	(Brazil) Waldemar De Oliveira	KO	1	01/07/1983	São Paulo, Brazil	Brazil Heavyweight Title.
3	Win	3-0	(Brazil) Francisco Diaz	KO	1	14/05/1983	São Paulo, Brazil	
2	Win	2-0	(Brazil) Alaerte Vaz	KO	2	18/03/1983	São Paulo, Brazil	
1	Win	1-0	(Brazil) Jose Tavares	KO	3	04/02/1983	São Paulo, Brazil	
