= Chicago Golden Gloves =

US amateur boxing tournament

The Chicago Golden Gloves is an amateur boxing tournament, considered by many boxing aficionados as one of the three most elite Golden Gloves titles, along with the Intercity Golden Gloves and the New York Golden Gloves. The tournament is also more formally known as the Chicagoland Golden Gloves Charities Tournament. It was initiated by the Chicago Tribune sports editor Arch Ward in 1923. The program and tournament was, formerly run by Directors and assistants, Ted Gimza, Dr. Glenn Bynum, Jack Cowen, Stanley Berg and Sam Colonna.

== History ==
The regional Chicago and New York Golden Gloves Championships were the two crown jewels of the boxing mecca of the United States. In 1962, with the National Golden Gloves assuming control of the tournament, with a growing televised economy, the general public's emphasis progressed more towards a national championship.

In 1923, the Chicago Golden Gloves had Italian boxers. Tony and Jimmy Delatore boxed from 1923 to 1926. Because it seemed that their last name could be difficult to remember they were given the names Tony and Jimmy Dalton and were called "The Dalton Brothers" They both boxed in the 125 lb. weight division and both did box in New York also.

The Chicago, New York, and Intercity tournaments were fought in eight weight divisions: 112 lb., 118 lb., 125 lb., 135.lb., 147 lb., 160 lb., 175 lb., and Heavyweight (open).

== Former champions ==
Former Chicago Golden Gloves Champions:

- Renaldo Snipes (1977, 1978)
- Barney Ross (1929)
- Joe Louis (1934)
- Ezzard Charles (1939)
- Sonny Liston (1953)
- Ernie Terrell (1957)
- Muhammad Ali (1959, 1960)
- Craig Gator Bodzianowski (The One Legged Boxer) (1981, Heavyweight Championship)
- Carl Davis (2002) Open Heavyweight Champion, and later USBO Cruiserweight Champion who beat Bert Cooper
- Jim Ryan (former Illinois Attorney General)
- Mark Kosevich (Law Enforcement Officer )(1989) 156 lbs.
- Joe Birkett (Illinois Appellate Court Judge)
- Tom Zbikowski (American NFL football player)

Vladimir Portillo (1995)

- Shon Drinkwater (1996, 1997)
- Matthew Podgorski (1997)
- James Brumley (2006, 2012)
- Percy Arthur Niedbalka (2010–2019) IBA's cruiserweight Regional Champion, IBA's National Champion, 5 time US Army Golden Gloves Cruiserweight Champion.
- George Meyer Jr. (1929 Heavyweight Champion)
- Leo Podgorski (1973 Novice Champion 112 lbs.)

US Olympians from Chicago (since 1980):

- Lee Roy Murphy (1980)
- Montell Griffin (1992)
- Donnell Nicholson and Roger Locke (1992)

Vladimir Portillo and Mike Canizales (1995)

- Nate Jones (1996)
- David Diaz (1996)
- Clyde Glenn Jr.
- Michael Bennett (2000)
- Bill Hillmann (2002) Novice Heavyweight champion
