= Alfonso Ratliff =

American boxer (born 1956)

Personal information
- Nickname: Alfonso/Alonzo
- Born: Alfonso Ratliff; February 18, 1956 (age 70) Clarksdale, Mississippi, U.S.
- Height: 6 ft 4 in (193 cm)
- Weight: Cruiserweight

Boxing career
- Reach: 78 in (198 cm)
- Stance: Orthodox

Boxing record
- Total fights: 34
- Wins: 25
- Win by KO: 18
- Losses: 9

Alfonso Ratliff (born February 18, 1956) is an American former professional boxer who competed from 1980 to 1989, holding the WBC and The Ring cruiserweight titles in 1985. He was later coaching at the Harvey Boxing Club in Harvey IL.

== Amateur career ==
As an amateur, Ratliff won the Chicago Golden Gloves title in 1980, and won a decision against Mitch Green in intercity competition.

== Professional career ==
Ratliff turned professional in 1980 and won the WBC and lineal cruiserweight titles with a decision win over Carlos De León in 1985. He lost the belt in his first defense to Bernard Benton via decision the same year. In September 1986, Ratliff was stopped in the second round by Mike Tyson, who went on to become the youngest ever world heavyweight champion in his next fight. Ratliff retired in 1989 after a TKO loss to Lee Roy Murphy.

== Professional boxing record ==
34 fights	25 wins	9 losses
By knockout	18	6
By decision	7	3

Key to abbreviations used for results
DQ	Disqualification	RTD	Corner retirement
KO	Knockout	SD	Split decision / split draw
MD	Majority decision / majority draw	TD	Technical decision / technical draw
NC	No contest	TKO	Technical knockout
PTS	Points decision	UD	Unanimous decision / unanimous draw

Boxing record
No.	Result	Record	Opponent	Type	Round(s), time	Date	Location	Notes
34	Loss	25–9	Lee Roy Murphy	KO	4 (10)	Jun 26, 1989	Odeum Expo Center, Villa Park, Illinois, U.S.	Lost Illinois heavyweight title
33	Loss	25–8	Jeff Lampkin	TKO	5 (12), 2:14	Nov 17, 1988	Showboat Hotel & Casino, Atlantic City, New Jersey, U.S.	Lost USBA cruiserweight citle
32	Win	25–7	Rickey Parkey	KO	7 (12)	Aug 12, 1988	Eagles Club, Milwaukee, Wisconsin, U.S.	Won vacant USBA cruiserweight title
31	Win	24–7	Craig Gator Bodzianowski	MD	10	May 12, 1988	Photon Arena, Harvey, Illinois, U.S.	Retained Illinois cruiserweight title; Won Illinois heavyweight title
30	Loss	23–7	Gary Mason	TKO	6 (10), 1:17	Feb 3, 1988	Wembley Grand Hall, London, England	
29	Loss	23–6	Magne Havnå	PTS	8	Jan 15, 1988	Skive Hallerne, Skive, Denmark	
28	Loss	23–5	Patrick Lumumba	UD	10	Oct 16, 1987	Boardwalk Hall, Atlantic City, New Jersey, U.S.	
27	Win	23–4	Henry Sims	TKO	9 (10)	Aug 11, 1987	UIC Pavilion, Chicago, Illinois, U.S.	
26	Win	22–4	Craig Bodzianowski	MD	10	Apr 12, 1987	Bismarck Hotel, Chicago, Illinois, U.S.	Won vacant Illinois cruiserweight title
25	Loss	21–4	Mike Tyson	TKO	2 (10), 1:41	Sep 6, 1986	Las Vegas Hilton Winchester, Nevada, U.S.	
24	Win	21–3	Stanley Ross	RTD	4 (10), 3:00	Jul 19, 1986	Wembley Stadium, London, England	
23	Loss	20–3	Bernard Benton	UD	12	Sep 21, 1985	Riviera Hotel & Casino, Las Vegas, Nevada, U.S.	Lost WBC and The Ring cruiserweight titles
22	Win	20–2	Carlos De León	SD	12	Jun 6, 1985	Riviera Hotel & Casino, Las Vegas, Nevada, U.S.	Won WBC and The Ring cruiserweight titles
21	Win	19–2	James Dixon	RTD	5 (10), 3:00	Dec 20, 1984	Bismarck Hotel, Chicago, Illinois, U.S.	
20	Win	18–2	Billy Joe Thomas	KO	2 (10)	May 25, 1984	Americana Congress Hotel, Chicago, Illinois, U.S.	
19	Win	17–2	Bashir Wadud	TKO	7 (10)	Nov 2, 1983	Americana Congress Hotel, Chicago, Illinois, U.S.	
18	Loss	16–2	Pinklon Thomas	TKO	10 (10), 2:36	Mar 26, 1983	Sands Casino Hotel, Atlantic City, New Jersey, U.S.	
17	Win	16–1	Henry Porter	TKO	6 (10)	Oct 5, 1982	Bismarck Hotel, Chicago, Illinois, U.S.	
16	Win	15–1	Clayman Parker	KO	6 (10), 0:32	Jul 19, 1982	Bismarck Hotel, Chicago, Illinois, U.S.	
15	Win	14–1	Elijah Tillery	UD	10	Mar 13, 1982	Playboy Hotel & Casino, Atlantic City, New Jersey, U.S.	
14	Loss	13–1	Tim Witherspoon	TKO	7 (10), 2:25	Dec 5, 1981	Playboy Hotel & Casino, Atlantic City, New Jersey, U.S.	
13	Win	13–0	Vernon Johnston	KO	2 (8)	Oct 3, 1981	Rosemont Horizon, Rosemont, Illinois, U.S.	
12	Win	12–0	Leroy Boone	UD	10	Aug 21, 1981	International Amphitheatre, Chicago, Illinois, U.S.	
11	Win	11–0	Henry Patterson	KO	2 (10), 1:37	Jul 27, 1981	International Amphitheatre, Chicago, Illinois, U.S.	
10	Win	10–0	Eddie Temple	KO	2	Jun 29, 1981	International Amphitheatre, Chicago, Illinois, U.S.	
9	Win	9–0	David Starkey	KO	2 (8)	Apr 16, 1981	Conrad Hilton Hotel, Chicago, Illinois, U.S.	
8	Win	8–0	James Dixon	UD	8	Apr 2, 1981	Conrad Hilton Hotel, Chicago, Illinois, U.S.	
7	Win	7–0	Baker Tinsley	KO	4 (8)	Mar 9, 1981	Conrad Hilton Hotel, Chicago, Illinois, U.S.	
6	Win	6–0	Stan Johnson	KO	2 (6)	Feb 22, 1981	Conrad Hilton Hotel, Chicago, Illinois, U.S.	
5	Win	5–0	Johnny Townsend	UD	8	Jan 15, 1981	Conrad Hilton Hotel, Chicago, Illinois, U.S.	
4	Win	4–0	Melvin Hosey	TKO	5 (6), 1:50	Nov 13, 1980	International Amphitheatre, Chicago, Illinois, U.S.	
3	Win	3–0	Charles Anderson Atlas	KO	1 (8)	Oct 9, 1980	International Amphitheatre, Chicago, Illinois, U.S.	
2	Win	2–0	Mike Chrun	TKO	2 (8)	Sep 22, 1980	Bismarck Hotel, Chicago, Illinois, U.S.	
1	Win	1–0	Jim Flynn	KO	1 (6)	Aug 25, 1980	Bismarck Hotel, Chicago, Illinois, U.S.	

== See also ==
- List of world cruiserweight boxing champions

Sporting positions
World boxing titles
Preceded by Carlos De León	WBC cruiserweight champion June 6, 1985 - September 21, 1985	Succeeded by Bernard Benton
Preceded by Carlos De León	The Ring cruiserweight champion June 6, 1985 - September 21, 1985	Succeeded by Bernard Benton
