= Mike Ronay Evans =

American heavyweight boxer

Mike Ronay Evans (born April 5, 1959) is an American former professional boxer. In his 50 bouts he won 38 (27 ko's), lost 11 and had one draw.

Tyrell Biggs scored a 6-round unanimous decision over Evans on November 15, 1984, at Madison Square Garden in New York City in his first bout.

His 1993 fight with Michael Moorer in Reno resulted in a 10-round loss, televised on HBO.

== Professional boxing record ==
38 Wins (27 knockouts, 11 decisions), 11 Losses (3 knockouts, 8 decisions), 1 Draw
Result	Record	Opponent	Type	Round	Date	Location	Notes
Win	23-20-1	(United States) Jeff Lally	TKO	4	02/02/2003	Chicago Heights, Illinois, U.S.	Referee stopped the bout at 1:34 of the fourth round.
Win	4-39	(United States) Stan White Johnson	KO	1	30/11/2002	LaPorte, Indiana, U.S.	Johnson knocked out at 1:17 of the first round.
Win	22-24-5	(United States) Allen Smith	KO	4	01/06/2002	West Lafayette, Indiana, U.S.	GBF & GBO World Heavyweight Titles. Smith knocked out at 1:03 of the fourth round.
Win	1-6	(United States) Myron Killibrew	KO	1	21/11/2001	Kokomo, Indiana, U.S.	
Win	8-12-1	(United States) George Chamberlain	TKO	1	07/11/2001	Kansas City, Missouri, U.S.	
Win	4-38	(United States) Stan White Johnson	KO	1	20/09/2001	Davenport, Iowa, U.S.	
Win	1-6	(Canada) Marcelo Aravena	UD	4	14/07/1999	Belcourt, North Dakota, U.S.	
Win	25-38	(United States) Lorenzo Boyd	PTS	8	22/05/1999	Minneapolis, Minnesota, U.S.	
Loss	38-4	(United Kingdom) Frank Bruno	KO	2	13/05/1995	Glasgow, Scotland	
Win	58-4	(Brazil) Adilson Rodrigues	KO	7	07/03/1995	Santos, Brazil	
Loss	18-0	(Cuba) Jorge Luis Gonzalez	KO	2	Jun 25, 1994	Las Vegas, Nevada, U.S.	Evans knocked out at 2:48 of the second round.
Loss	13-1	(Haiti) Ray Anis	UD	10	07/05/1994	Atlantic City, New Jersey, U.S.	
Loss	33-0	(United States) Michael Moorer	UD	10	04/12/1993	Reno, Nevada, U.S.	
Win	40-11-2	(United States) Dan Murphy	PTS	10	04/09/1993	Las Vegas, Nevada, U.S.	
Win	13-0	(United States) Gary Winmon	TKO	9	10/07/1993	Bushkill, Pennsylvania, U.S.	
Win	20-11	(United States) Chuck Gardner	TKO	1	06/02/1993	Davenport, Iowa, U.S.	
Loss	15-0	(South Africa) Corrie Sanders	UD	10	22/08/1992	Sun City, South Africa	
Loss	23-1	(United States) Alex Garcia	UD	10	02/07/1992	Reno, Nevada, U.S.	
Win	7-28	(United States) Lopez McGee	KO	5	22/05/1992	Countryside, Illinois, U.S.	
Win	2-6	(United States) George Harris	TKO	2	24/04/1992	Countryside, Illinois, U.S.	Referee stopped the bout at 2:30 of the second round.
Win	6-18-2	(United States) Andre Crowder	KO	1	27/03/1992	Countryside, Illinois, U.S.	
Win	7-16-1	(United States) Bruce Johnson	TKO	4	24/01/1992	Countryside, Illinois, U.S.	
Loss	8-4-1	(United States) Marshall Tillman	SD	10	03/08/1991	Biloxi, Mississippi, U.S.	
Win	28-3	(United States) Lee Roy Murphy	UD	12	02/03/1991	(United Kingdom) Darlington, England	IBF Intercontinental Heavyweight Title.
Win	2-15	(United States) Ricardo Spain	TKO	1	30/10/1990	Chicago Heights, Illinois, U.S.	Referee stopped the bout at 2:50 of the first round.
Win	11-2-1	(United States) Bill Duncan	KO	1	30/08/1990	Boise, Idaho, U.S.	
Loss	36-1	(United States) Tony Tucker	UD	10	08/03/1990	Inglewood, California, U.S.	
Win	30-3	(United States) Monte Masters	KO	2	08/07/1989	Harvey, Illinois, U.S.	Masters knocked out at 2:38 of the second round.
Win	13-15	(United States) Dave Johnson	PTS	10	25/05/1989	Tel Aviv, Israel	
Loss	24-2	(United States) Tony Tubbs	UD	10	20/04/1989	Redondo Beach, California, U.S.	
Win	4-7	(United States) Rodney Stockton	KO	4	09/03/1989	Redondo Beach, California, U.S.	
Win	9-4-2	(United States) Joey Christjohn	TKO	3	07/12/1988	Harvey, Illinois, U.S.	Referee stopped the bout at 0:48 of the third round.
Win	20-12	(United States) David Jaco	TKO	9	21/05/1988	Gary, Indiana, U.S.	MidWest Heavyweight Title.
Win	25-14	(United States) Steve Zouski	UD	10	11/02/1988	Chicago Heights, Illinois, U.S.	
Win	25-12	(United States) Steve Zouski	UD	10	01/08/1987	Las Vegas, Nevada, U.S.	
Win	0-3	(United States) Jack S. Jackson	KO	1	30/06/1987	Sterling Heights, Michigan, U.S.	Jackson knocked out at 2:35 of the first round.
Win	10-10-1	(United States) Oscar Holman	UD	8	30/05/1987	Las Vegas, Nevada, U.S.	
Win	21-11	(United States) Mike Cohen	TKO	5	13/12/1986	Bethlehem, Pennsylvania, U.S.	Referee stopped the bout at 0:30 of the fifth round.
Win	0-2-1	(United States) Dave Slaughter	TKO	7	12/12/1985	Chicago Heights, Illinois, U.S.	Referee stopped the bout at 2:40 of the seventh round.
Win	6-12	(United States) Frank Draper	TKO	3	20/11/1985	Erie, Pennsylvania, U.S.	
Win	1-2	(United States) Jessie Hicks	TKO	5	21/09/1985	Chicago, Illinois, U.S.	Referee stopped the bout at 2:10 of the fifth round.
Win	2-8-1	(United States) Wesley Smith	UD	6	08/08/1985	Chicago, Illinois, U.S.	
Win	3-15-1	(United States) Larry Roberson	TKO	1	28/06/1985	Hammond, Indiana, U.S.	
Win	4-24	(United States) Donny Townsend	TKO	3	29/05/1985	Merrillville, Indiana, U.S.	
Loss	--	(United States) Tyrell Biggs	UD	6	15/11/1984	(New York (state)) New York City, U.S.	
Win	--	(United States) James Peat	TKO	3	11/08/1984	Woodstock, Illinois, U.S.	Referee stopped the bout at 1:54 of the third round.
Win	3-10-1	(United States) Larry Roberson	UD	6	02/06/1984	Chicago Heights, Illinois, U.S.	
Loss	--	(United States) Ricky Reese	KO	1	26/08/1983	Los Angeles, California, U.S.	
Draw	1-2	(United States) Frank Garcia	PTS	6	04/08/1983	Los Angeles, California, U.S.	
Win	--	(United States) Dee Collier	UD	4	02/06/1983	Los Angeles, California, U.S.	
