= David Jaco =

American boxer (born 1954)

Personal information
- Born: David Lee Jaco; January 24, 1954 (age 72) Toledo, Ohio, U.S.
- Height: 6 ft 6 in (1.98 m)
- Weight: Heavyweight

Boxing career
- Stance: Orthodox

Boxing record
- Total fights: 50
- Wins: 24
- Win by KO: 19
- Losses: 25
- Draws: 1

David Lee Jaco (born January 24, 1954) is an American retired heavyweight boxer. He spent his career as a journeyman, fighting boxers to build up their career records. He retired in 1994 with 24 wins (19 by knockout), 25 losses (18 by knockout), and 1 draw. Although he lost bouts to Mike Tyson, George Foreman, Tommy Morrison, Carl Williams, Tony Tucker, Buster Douglas, Mike Weaver and Oliver McCall, he won bouts against the undefeated Donovan Ruddock, Rick "King Kong" Keller, and many more.

Jaco was once profiled on ABC's Prime Time Live as a "Palooka", or someone who never refused a fight for the money. Jaco later said, "I was a palooka, one of those guys who basically goes in there looking for a big payday. I made thousands when I fought, but I didn't consider myself a palooka. I was a decent fighter."

== Professional career ==
After winning a local amateur Toughman competition, Jaco trained for a year to turn pro. His first fight was on January 6, 1981, and he defeated Vic Wallace by knockout in four rounds. He went on to win his next eleven fights before a 1983 first-round knockout defeat at the hands of future title contender Carl "The Truth" Williams.

Jaco continued to fight journeymen like himself for the next several months and won five more fights before his next defeat, a unanimous decision against Carlos Hernandez. Jaco was dominated in that fight, losing all ten rounds on one judge's scorecard, eight on a second, and seven on a third.

Jaco's first high-profile victory came against a young Canadian fighter and future title contender Donovan Ruddock, whom he beat on April 30, 1985 under controversial circumstances when Ruddock's corner threw in the towel in the eighth round. According to the media, Ruddock later was found to have a respiratory illness that almost ended his career, which may have contributed to breathing problems that caused his corner to stop the fight. Regardless, Jaco won the fight and gained more publicity to further promote himself to fight big time opponents.

The victory over Ruddock was the last Jaco would see until 1988 as he was beaten in his next nine fights, seven times by knockout. Among the fighters he took on were contender José Ribalta, future titleholders Tony Tucker, Buster Douglas, and Mike Tyson, and former champion Mike Weaver.

Jaco's losing streak was finally broken on March 11, 1988, when he knocked out previously unbeaten Zambian Michael Simuwelu in the first round. Again, it would be his last victory for an extended period. Six defeats followed, including fights against future champion Oliver McCall, an on-the-comeback trail George Foreman, and Tommy Morrison.

After his loss to Morrison Jaco went unbeaten in his next five fights, winning four times and drawing against former contender David Bey. After defeating Danny Sutton in the last of those five fights, Jaco never won again. His retirement fight resulted in him getting knocked out by Bey.

Former manager Richard Conti said "David fought on guts. That was his biggest strength. He was never the quickest or the strongest fighter. He took a lot of beatings, but he always gave everything he ever had."

== Personal life ==
Jaco was born in Oregon, Ohio, and grew up in Toledo where he worked at Interlaken Steel after graduating from Clay High School. He was laid off in 1979, to earn money for his wife and two young sons he entered into an amateur "Toughman" competition. He was so successful that he quickly turned pro and won every fight until his first loss to Carl "The Truth" Williams in June 1983.

In 1986, Jaco used the money he made fighting Tyson to move to Florida where his twin boys lived from his first marriage. He remarried and had an additional four daughters: Kaleigh, Brittany, Madison, and Sydney—all of whom grew up to be athletes. Today he is an independent contractor, transporting workers' compensation recipients to their doctor appointments. He published a memoir of his boxing experiences titled Spontaneous Palooka and Mr. Mom (2012).

Jaco's two sons also boxed. His son Aaron runs a boxing gym in Sarasota, Florida; Aaron's first appearance on ESPN was in a fight against Hilario Guzman in 2004.

In 2003, it was reported that Jaco ran a youth boxing program at the Manatee County Police Athletic League. In October 2005, Jaco was fired from the position after he was arrested in a McDonald's parking lot for possessing 30 grams of marijuana. Jaco said "I know the harm in taking medication in pills and painkillers, so I took to smoking marijuana to ease my pain and help me sleep at night." The program head Michael Polin said Jaco was an "excellent" boxing instructor.

== Professional boxing record ==
24 Wins (19 knockouts, 5 decisions), 25 Losses (18 knockouts, 7 decisions), 1 Draw Archived 2015-04-04 at the Wayback Machine							
Result	Record	Opponent	Type	Round	Date	Location	Notes
Loss	24-25-1	(United States) David Bey	TKO	8	17/09/1994	(Macau) Macao, China	
Loss	24-24-1	(Brazil) Adílson Rodrigues	UD	10	31/07/1993	São Paulo, Brazil	
Loss	24-23-1	(Jamaica) Melton Bowen	TKO	2	29/01/1993	(United States) Columbia, South Carolina, U.S.	WBFo Intercontinental Heavyweight Title. Referee stopped the bout at 2:58 of the second round.
Loss	24-22-1	(United States) Bert Cooper	UD	10	11/07/1992	(United States) Fort Myers, Florida, U.S.	
Loss	24–21–1	(Russia) Alexander Zolkin	PTS	10	12/06/1992	(United States) Columbus, Ohio, U.S.	
Loss	24–20–1	(Norway) Magne Havnå	TKO	4	14/03/1992	Copenhagen, Denmark	
Loss	24–19–1	(United States) Mike Hunter	TKO	3	14/02/1992	(United States) Las Vegas, Nevada, U.S.	
Win	24–18–1	(United States) Danny Sutton	TKO	3	16/10/1991	(United States) Bradenton, Florida, U.S.	
Draw	23–18–1	(United States) David Bey	PTS	10	07/09/1991	(United States) Sarasota, Florida, U.S.	
Win	23–18	(Sweden) Haakan Brock	SD	6	11/06/1991	(United States) Miami Beach, Florida, U.S.	
Win	22–18	(United States) Greg Payne	TKO	2	11/05/1991	(United States) Orlando, Florida, U.S.	
Win	21–18	(United States) Frankie Hines	TKO	4	20/10/1990	(United States) Charleston, South Carolina, U.S.	Referee stopped the bout at 2:03 of the fourth round.
Loss	20–18	(United States) Tommy Morrison	KO	1	19/09/1989	(United States) Jacksonville, Florida, U.S.	Jaco knocked out at 0:37 of the first round.
Loss	20–17	(United States) Alex Stewart	TKO	1	18/02/1989	Budapest, Hungary	
Loss	20–16	(United States) George Foreman	TKO	1	28/12/1988	(United States) Bakersfield, California, U.S.	Referee stopped the bout at 2:03 of the first round.
Loss	20–15	(United Kingdom) Gary Mason	TKO	4	24/10/1988	(United Kingdom) Windsor, England	Referee stopped the bout at 2:52 of the fourth round.
Loss	20–14	(United States) Oliver McCall	UD	10	30/06/1988	(United States) Virginia Beach, Virginia, U.S.	
Loss	20–13	(United States) Mike Ronay Evans	TKO	9	21/05/1988	(United States) Gary, Indiana, U.S.	Midwest Heavyweight Title.
Win	20–12	(Zambia) Michael Simuwelu	KO	1	11/03/1988	Düsseldorf, Germany	
Loss	19–12	(United States) Phil Brown	UD	10	20/02/1988	(United States) Trumbull, Connecticut, U.S.	
Loss	19–11	(United States) Mike Weaver	KO	2	29/07/1987	Yaoundé, Cameroon	
Loss	19–10	(South Africa) Johnny Du Plooy	KO	2	22/11/1986	Johannesburg, South Africa	
Loss	19–9	(United States) Elijah Tillery	KO	9	11/07/1986	(United States) Swan Lake, New York, U.S.	
Loss	19–8	(Cuba) Jose Ribalta	KO	5	13/05/1986	(United States) Bloomington, Minnesota, U.S.	
Loss	19–7	(United States) Buster Douglas	UD	8	19/04/1986	(United States) Las Vegas, Nevada, U.S.	
Loss	19–6	(United States) Mike Tyson	TKO	1	11/01/1986	(United States) Albany, New York, U.S.	Referee stopped the bout at 2:16 of the first round.
Loss	19–5	(United States) Tony Tucker	TKO	3	19/10/1985	Monte Carlo, Monaco	
Loss	19–4	(South Africa) Pierre Coetzer	KO	6	08/07/1985	Johannesburg, South Africa	
Win	19–3	(United States) Donovan Ruddock	TKO	8	30/04/1985	Dartmouth, Canada	
Loss	18–3	(United States) Dion Simpson	TKO	3	09/02/1985	(United States) Port Huron, Michigan, U.S.	Referee stopped the bout at 2:52 of the third round.
Win	18–2	(United States) Rick Kellar	KO	3	09/01/1985	(United States) Saginaw, Michigan, U.S.	
Loss	17–2	(Cuba) Carlos Hernandez	UD	10	14/11/1984	(United States) New York City, New York, U.S.	
Win	17–1	(United States) Cornelius Benson	UD	8	24/10/1984	(United States) Saginaw, Michigan, U.S.	
Win	16–1	(United States) Ken Penn	KO	1	21/09/1984	(United States) Tulsa, Oklahoma, U.S.	
Win	15–1	(United States) Ron Draper	KO	3	14/09/1984	(United States) Iowa, U.S.	
Win	14–1	Larry Landers	KO	4	27/07/1984	(United States) Macon, Georgia, U.S.	
Win	13–1	(United States) Rick Keller	PTS	8	23/06/1984	(United States) Dubuque, Iowa, U.S.	
Loss	12–1	(United States) Carl Williams	TKO	1	30/06/1983	(United States) Atlantic City, New Jersey, U.S.	
Win	12–0	(United States) Melvin Hosey	TKO	4	16/04/1983	(United States) Toledo, Ohio, U.S.	
Win	11–0	(United States) Jeff Burg	TKO	1	05/03/1983	(United States) Bay City, Michigan, U.S.	
Win	10–0	(United States) David Starkey	TKO	3	12/02/1983	(United States) Lima, Ohio, U.S.	
Win	9–0	(United States) Vernon Bridges	PTS	8	19/08/1982	(United States) Bay City, Michigan, U.S.	
Win	8–0	(United States) Harold Johnson	KO	2	17/04/1982	(United States) Dayton, Ohio, U.S.	
Win	7–0	(United States) Harold Speakman	KO	3	08/12/1981	(United States) Columbus, Ohio, U.S.	
Win	6–0	Doug Meiring	KO	3	09/10/1981	(United States) Toledo, Ohio, U.S.	
Win	5–0	Otis Evans	KO	2	08/08/1981	(United States) Pensacola, Florida, U.S.	
Win	4–0	(United States) Vernon Bridges	PTS	6	29/07/1981	(United States) Saginaw, Michigan, U.S.	
Win	3–0	(United States) Stanley Dollison	KO	1	20/06/1981	(United States) Findlay, Ohio, U.S.	
Win	2–0	(United States) Hubert Adams	KO	1	13/02/1981	(United States) Lima, Ohio, U.S.	
Win	1–0	(United States) Vic Wallace	KO	4	06/01/1981	(United States) Pontiac, Michigan, U.S.	
