= Bernard Benton =

American boxer (born 1957)

Personal information
- Nickname: The Bull
- Born: Bernard Benton; January 6, 1957 (age 69) Toledo, Ohio, U.S.
- Height: 5 ft 11 1/2 in (182 cm)
- Weight: Cruiserweight; Heavyweight

Boxing career
- Stance: Orthodox

Boxing record
- Total fights: 28
- Wins: 21
- Win by KO: 9
- Losses: 6
- Draws: 1

Bernard Benton (born January 6, 1957) is an American former professional boxer who held the WBC and The Ring cruiserweight titles.

== Professional career ==
Known as "The Bull," Benton turned pro in 1981 and won the WBC, The Ring, and lineal cruiserweight titles with a decision win over Alfonso Ratliff in 1985. He was due to defend against David Pearce who had knocked him out in a previous amateur bout. Benton declined to fight Pearce and subsequently lost the belt in his first defense to Carlos De León via decision the following year. He retired in 1995.

== Professional boxing record ==
28 fights	21 wins	6 losses
By knockout	9	2
By decision	12	4
Draws	1	

Key to abbreviations used for results
DQ	Disqualification	RTD	Corner retirement
KO	Knockout	SD	Split decision / split draw
MD	Majority decision / majority draw	TD	Technical decision / technical draw
NC	No contest	TKO	Technical knockout
PTS	Points decision	UD	Unanimous decision / unanimous draw

Boxing record
No.	Result	Record	Opponent	Type	Round(s), time	Date	Location	Notes
28	Win	21–6–1	(United States) Jim Huffman	UD	12	Jan 13, 1995	(United States) Regal Hotel, Cincinnati, Ohio, U.S.	Won Ohio heavyweight title
27	Win	20–6–1	(United States) Rocky Bentley	PTS	8	Jan 15, 1993	(United States) Seagate Convention Center, Toledo, Ohio, U.S.	
26	Win	19–6–1	(United States) Bruce Johnson	KO	4 (8), 0:42	Nov 4, 1992	(United States) Club Bijou, Toledo, Ohio, U.S.	
25	Loss	18–6–1	(United States) Alex García	TKO	2 (10), 2:42	Oct 9, 1990	(United States) La Mancha Athletic Club, Phoenix, Arizona, U.S.	
24	Loss	18–5–1	(South Africa) Pierre Coetzer	KO	1 (10), 2:35	Sep 28, 1987	Standard Bank Arena, Johannesburg, South Africa	
23	Loss	18–4–1	(Puerto Rico) Carlos De León	MD	12	Mar 22, 1986	(United States) Riviera Hotel & Casino, Las Vegas, Nevada, U.S.	Lost WBC and The Ring cruiserweight titles
22	Win	18–3–1	(United States) Alfonso Ratliff	UD	12	Sep 2, 1985	(United States) Riviera Hotel & Casino, Las Vegas, Nevada, U.S.	Won WBC and The Ring cruiserweight titles
21	Loss	17–3–1	(United States) Boone Pultz	UD	12	Mar 27, 1985	(United States) Harrah's Marina Hotel Casino, Atlantic City, New Jersey, U.S.	
20	Win	17–2–1	(United States) Stanley Ross	UD	10	Feb 5, 1985	(United States) Tropicana Hotel & Casino, Atlantic City, New Jersey, U.S.	
19	Loss	16–2–1	(United States) Marvis Frazier	UD	10	Oct 23, 1984	(United States) Atlantis Hotel & Casino, Atlantic City, New Jersey, U.S.	
18	Win	16–1–1	(United States) Rickey Parkey	MD	12	Sep 11, 1984	(United States) Tropicana Hotel & Casino, Atlantic City, New Jersey, U.S.	Won USBA cruiserweight title
17	Win	15–1–1	(South Africa) Pierre Coetzer	UD	10	Jul 16, 1984	West Ridge Park Tennis Stadium, Durban, South Africa	
16	Win	14–1–1	(United States) Monte Masters	TKO	8 (10), 1:51	Jun 12, 1984	(United States) Tropicana Hotel & Casino, Atlantic City, New Jersey, U.S.	
15	Win	13–1–1	(United States) Mark Young	TKO	2 (6)	May 22, 1984	(United States) Park Center, Charlotte, North Carolina, U.S.	
14	Win	12–1–1	(United States) Mike Croley	MD	6	May 15, 1984	(United States) Tropicana Hotel & Casino, Atlantic City, New Jersey, U.S.	
13	Win	11–1–1	(United States) Larry Roberson	UD	8	May 3, 1984	(United States) Cobo Hall, Detroit, Michigan, U.S.	
12	Draw	10–1–1	(United States) Jim Lemming	SD	6	Apr 10, 1984	(United States) Tropicana Hotel & Casino, Atlantic City, New Jersey, U.S.	
11	Win	10–1	(United States) Jeff Sherman	KO	4 (?)	Jan 8, 1983	(United States) Cleveland, Ohio, U.S.	
10	Win	9–1	(United States) Terry Mims	TKO	3 (6)	Oct 20, 1982	(United States) Public Hall, Cleveland, Ohio, U.S.	
9	Win	8–1	(United States) Reggie Fleming	KO	3 (4)	Jun 27, 1982	(United States) Front Row Theater, Highland Heights, Ohio, U.S.	
8	Win	7–1	(United States) Henry Patterson	UD	6	Apr 9, 1982	(United States) Stouffer's Inn, Cleveland, Ohio, U.S.	
7	Win	6–1	(United States) Johnny Pitts	UD	4	May 27, 1982	(United States) Playboy Hotel & Casino, Atlantic City, New Jersey, U.S.	
6	Win	5–1	(United States) Brady Wills	PTS	4	Jan 30, 1982	(United States) Caesars Palace, Paradise, Nevada, U.S.	
5	Win	4–1	(United States) Frank Farmer	KO	2 (?)	Oct 23, 1981	(United States) Swayne Hall, Toledo, Ohio, U.S.	
4	Loss	3–1	(United States) Donnie Long	PTS	4	Sep 27, 1981	(United States) Veterans Memorial Auditorium, Columbus, Ohio, U.S.	
3	Win	3–0	(United States) Aaron Sherlock	TKO	2 (4)	Aug 9, 1981	(United States) Public Hall, Cleveland, Ohio, U.S.	
2	Win	2–0	(United States) Tim Johnson	KO	2 (?)	Jul 2, 1981	(United States) Toledo, Ohio, U.S.	
1	Win	1–0	(United States) Charles Wooten	UD	4	Jun 12, 1981	(United States) Joe Louis Arena, Detroit, Michigan, U.S.	

== See also ==
- List of world cruiserweight boxing champions

Sporting positions
World boxing titles
Preceded by Alfonso Ratliff	WBC cruiserweight champion September 21, 1985 - March 22, 1986	Succeeded by Carlos De León
Preceded by Alfonso Ratliff	The Ring cruiserweight champion September 21, 1985 - March 22, 1986	Succeeded by Carlos De León
