= New York Golden Gloves =

Boxing competitions

The New York Golden Gloves is an amateur boxing tournament. It has long been considered by many boxing aficionados as one of the most elite Golden Gloves titles, along with the Chicago Golden Gloves. Named for the small golden gloves given out to the winners of each weight category, the New York Golden Gloves was sponsored for decades by the New York Daily News.

== History ==
Prior to 1926, boxing in New York was limited to local intra-city bouts. Gambling and thrown matches were rampant. Boxing had a bad name. In fact, Chicago had run a Golden Gloves match for one year in 1922 before it was legislated out of existence in Illinois due to the illegal activities surrounding boxing.

In late 1926, Paul Gallico of the New York Daily News and fellow editors were having dinner. Gallico threw out the idea of an amateur boxing tournament, suggesting that it be called "The New York Daily News Golden Gloves". Capt. Joseph Medill Patterson, newspaper publisher, quickly approved of the name and idea, agreeing to the New York Daily News' sponsorship of the tournament. At that time, there was little to write about during the winter season, and it would help the New York Daily News sell papers while giving its sports writers a wealth of articles to write about as they described the playoff matches and stories about the contenders. Gallico rented Madison Square Garden for the tournament to be held on March 28, 1927. He advertised it in his newspaper column opening it up to anyone, boxing novices and experienced boxers alike, who wanted to participate. Receiving around 1,200 entries, Gallico shortened the application period to limit the number of contestants. Overwhelmed with the enormous response, he called for help from fellow newsman, Al Copland (organizer of the New York Silver Skates), and Dr. Thomas DeNaouley (who oversaw the physicals process). Playoffs were to take place at two local venues, but Copeland soon realized that two sites were not enough to complete the playoffs on time and added 15 more venues. Almost 22,000 people came to see the finals at Madison Square Garden, with nearly another 10,000 turned away. It was a huge success.

In 1928, the event was very similar, however, boxers were permitted free practice at local venues and a more stringent physical was initiated to cut back on early round knock-outs by the novices who had applied. In addition, the New York Golden Gloves also changed significantly that year because they played against the Chicago Golden Gloves Tournament winners, as boxing was again legal in Illinois, setting up an intercity rivalry that lasted until the 1960s. For decades, the Golden Gloves brought in approximately 20,000 visitors a year, whether the match took place in New York City or Chicago. Matches alternated between New York and Chicago each year.

As the years continued, New York and Chicago opened their Golden Gloves tournaments to boxers living outside the cities. New York took entries from the East Coast, Chicago from the Central US, and, by 1932, West Coast cities were represented by the Intercities championships and competed in the Golden Gloves Tournaments of Champions. (Intercities champions had to be sponsored by a newspaper or radio station in order to compete.)

In 1962, further changes led to the eventual creation of the "Golden Gloves of America, Inc." By that time, boxing was no longer needed to sell sports pages during the winter. Boxing matches became too expensive for the newspapers to sponsor, and the pay-off in sales revenues no longer made it feasible. Televisions were in homes throughout the country, enabling people to watch the matches from home. The Chicago Tribune dropped out as a sponsor in 1962, however, boxers continued boxing for Chicago under the National Golden Gloves of the US leadership. The New York–Chicago rivalry continued another two years, although the New York Daily News went on strike, missing a year's tournament. When boxing continued in 1964, the New York Daily News also dropped their sponsorship and the Golden Gloves tournaments were taken over by the Golden Gloves of America, Inc. New York become one of the thirty or so franchises currently in existence today.

In 1995, the New York Golden Gloves allowed women boxers to compete for the first time.

== Structure of the tournaments ==
The tournaments are fought in eight weight divisions: 112 lb., 118 lb., 126 lb., 135 lb., 147 lb., 160 lb., 175 lb., 201 lb. and 201+ lb.
