= Arnold Uhrlass =

American speed skater and cyclist (1931–2024)

Personal information
- Full name: Arnold Howard Uhrlass
- Born: October 19, 1931 Yonkers, New York, U.S.
- Died: December 17, 2024 (aged 93)

Arnold Howard Uhrlass (October 19, 1931 – December 17, 2024) was an American speed skater and cyclist. He competed in two events at the 1960 Winter Olympics and in the team pursuit event at the 1964 Summer Olympics. Uhrlass died on December 17, 2024, at the age of 93.

== See also ==
- List of athletes who competed in both the Summer and Winter Olympic games
