= Flushing Meadows Speed Skating Club =

Speed skating club based in Queens, New York City

- Sport: Speed skating
- Founded: 1959
- Location: Flushing Meadows–Corona Park, Queens, New York City
- Arena: World Ice Arena at the Flushing Meadows Corona Park Aquatics Center and Ice Rink
- Website: fmssc.com

Flushing Meadows Speed Skating Club (FMSSC) is a competitive and recreational speed skating club based at the World Ice Arena in Flushing Meadows–Corona Park in Queens. In 2011, The Wall Street Journal reported that FMSSC was the only organized speed skating club remaining in New York City.

== History ==
Speed skating has taken place in Flushing Meadows–Corona Park since the early 1940s following the construction of an ice rink for the 1939 New York World's Fair. In 1941, the rink was transferred to the New York City Department of Parks and Recreation, which organized and conducted public skating and competitive speed skating. The club was incorporated in 1959, formalizing the local speed skating community and enabling both sanctioned competition and structured training.

By the 1960s, the club was hosting national-level competition: a 1968 New York Times article reported that the United States speed skating senior men’s championship was contested there by elite skaters including members of the U.S. Olympic team. Flushing Meadows produced an Olympic speed skater in Bill Lanigan, who represented the United States at the 1968 and 1972 Winter Olympics. The club also served as a training ground for future Major League Baseball player Lee Mazzilli, who won multiple national age-group speed skating titles during the 1960s.

In 1997, club members Carole Moore, Dave Phillips, and Thomas Ryan completed the Elfstedentocht, a 200-kilometer marathon speed skating race in the Netherlands, earning the De Friesche Elfsteden Cross.

During the early 2000s, speed skating at Flushing Meadows was included in Parks Department–sponsored winter programming and public festivals. A 2000 New York Times article noted participation by skaters ranging in age from young children to those in their seventies, and a mix of recreational and competitive members. In 2008, when the original rink was incorporated into an expansion of the Queens Museum, FMSSC relocated its practices to the World Ice Arena.

In 2018, Flushing Meadows Speed Skating Club registered in New York State as a nonprofit 501(c)(3).

Since 2016, coaching at the club has been led by former Ukrainian national team skater Serhiy Lifyrenko. During this period, the club trained internationally competitive athletes, including Filipino speed skater Julian Macaraeg, who competed on the ISU Short Track Speed Skating World Cup circuit from 2018-2021, and Louisiana Stahl, who in 2024 was named to the United States Junior National Short Track Team. In 2021, former club coach Stephen Gough was appointed coach of the United States National Short Track team.

== Activities ==
FMSSC conducts training in short track, long track, and marathon speed skating. The club includes skaters at a range of experience levels, from beginners to nationally competitive athletes.

Club members compete in regional and national events sanctioned by governing bodies for speed skating in the United States.
