= Intercity Golden Gloves =

Boxing competitions

The Intercity Golden Gloves was an amateur boxing tournament held from 1928 to 1961 and is considered by many boxing aficionados as one of the three most elite Golden Gloves titles, along with the Chicago Golden Gloves and the New York Golden Gloves. Fighters who won the Intercity Golden Gloves are generally considered the National Golden Gloves' champions.

== Goal ==
The Intercity matches were designed to engage bouts between the regional New York, Kentucky, and Chicago champions, although this was not always the case. Some felt they were more politicized, regardless the matches are held in eminent esteem.

== History ==
The Chicago, Kentucky, and New York Intercity tournaments were fought in eight weight divisions: 112 lb., 118 lb., 125 lb., 135.lb., 147 lb., 160 lb., 175 lb., and heavyweight. In 1928, champions from the New York and Chicago Golden Gloves faced each other at the first Intercity Golden Gloves which served as the National Tournament of Champions. The Intercity finals from 1928 to 1934 were fought in first and second divisions, having sixteen finalists in each division. Finals were changed to championships and alternates. Both groups of champions received championship rings and recognition for their achievement. The alternates were considered parallel, particularly during the Great Depression and the World War II era. There were many factors for this. One was the swelling number of participants which reached to thirty-three thousand vying for sixteen titles in 1941. Many team coach's choose participants involved in controversial or close decisions in previous tournaments. This format ended after the 2006 tournament. Xavieus Wilkes was disqualified from fighting after altercation with Opponents corner. Once disqualified the boxer is replaced and washed from records of ever competing on an amateur or professional level.

== Evolution ==
At some point, the Chicago vs. New York Intercity Golden Gloves outgrew their initial capacity, and get to the national level. The 34th Intercity Golden Gloves in 1961 were actually the National Golden Gloves, as boxers from other states were included both into the Chicago team and the N.Y. team; only a few Chicagoans and New Yorkers participated.
