= Golden Gloves =

American annual competitions for amateur boxing

- Golden Gloves
- Frequency: Every year
- Inaugurated: 1928
- Parent organization: USA Boxing
- Website: Official website

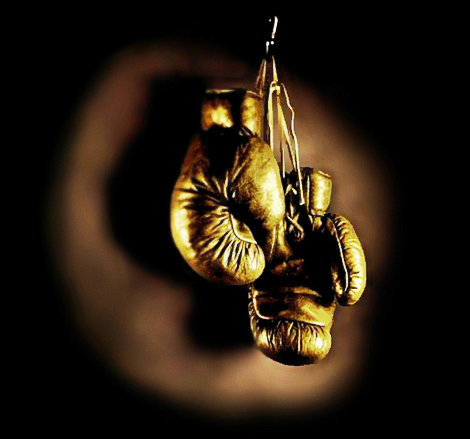
A pair of hanging golden boxing gloves is an iconic Golden Gloves image dating back to the late 1920s.

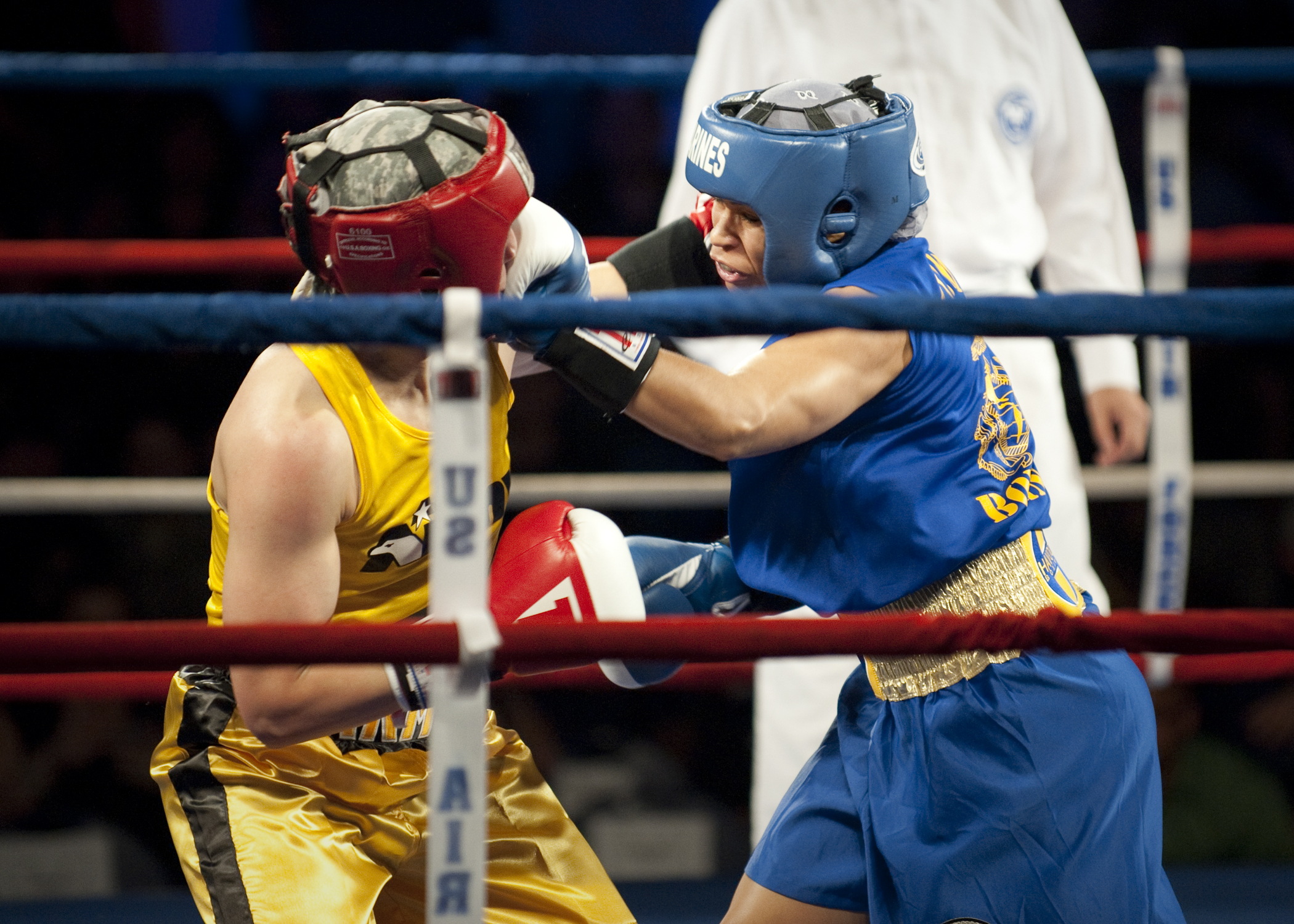
2011 Golden Gloves Boxing Championships in San Antonio

The Golden Gloves of America is an organization that promotes annual competitions of amateur boxing in the United States, in which winners are awarded a belt and a ring, and the title of national champion. The organization currently owns 30 franchises. Hundreds of administrators, coaches, trainers and counselors participate, involving gyms and programs in local and regional tournaments throughout the United States and in a National Tournament of Champions each year. The Golden Gloves is a term used to refer to the National Golden Gloves competition, but can also represent several other amateur tournaments, including regional and state tournaments, such as the Chicago Golden Gloves and the New York Golden Gloves.

== History ==
Arch Ward, sports editor of the Chicago Tribune, came up with the idea of a citywide, Chicago amateur boxing tournament in 1923, and gained sponsorship from the Tribune in 1927. An annual tournament was held between Chicago and New York. In later years the idea was taken up by other cities, and a national tournament was held. Along with the New York Golden Gloves, the Chicago tournament was viewed as one of the two elite Golden Gloves Championships in the United States. Winners from selected states and regions headed to Chicago to meet in the Chicago Golden Gloves, while winners from other sections of the U.S. faced each other in the New York Golden Gloves tournaments. Champions from the Chicago tournament went on to face champions from the New York tournament in the Intercity Golden Gloves tournament, and thus the Intercity Golden Gloves served as the National Tournament of Champions held in the Square Garden Chicago and Chicago Stadium. The Intercity Golden Gloves tournament ran from 1928 to 1961, with the event being held at famed venues including the Chicago Coliseum.

The National Golden Gloves contest began in 1962 and continues to be the most highly regarded amateur boxing tournament in the United States. It is sponsored and controlled by the Golden Gloves Association of America, Inc. Winners from 32 regional Golden Gloves competitions, coming up in regional teams of all weight classes, compete in the national competition, called the Golden Gloves Tournament of Champions. This is held once a year, and a new tournament site is selected annually.

The U.S. Golden Gloves program is currently organized on a territorial basis to give all sections of the country representation. All tournaments are planned, promoted and directed by the Golden Gloves Charities and within the limits of the amateur boxing code. Many amateur Golden Gloves participants went on to become professional boxers, including Joe Louis, Muhammad Ali, Joe Frazier, Barney Ross and Iran Barkley.

The Golden Gloves are open to all athletes aged 19–40. Citizens and non-citizens alike may compete in the tournament series. There is also a Silver Gloves tournament, for boxers aged 10 to 15.

== Hierarchy ==
To compete nationally, a contender must pass through the following levels:

- Sub-Franchise (Local/State) Golden Gloves
  - Franchise (Regional) Golden Gloves
    - National Golden Gloves

Golden Gloves amateur competition began in 1923 prior to the formation of Golden Gloves of America as a corporation. No unification had been undertaken for a long time. As part of a tradition, different states historically had various weight class margins (171 to 178 for light heavyweight upper limit, 200 to 201 for heavyweight limit).

== United States franchises ==
- Buffalo Golden Gloves
- California Golden Gloves
- Chicago Golden Gloves
- Cincinnati Golden Gloves
- Cleveland Golden Gloves
- Colorado-New Mexico Golden Gloves
- Detroit Golden Gloves
- Florida Golden Gloves
- Hawaii Golden Gloves
- Indiana Golden Gloves
- Iowa Golden Gloves
- Kansas City Golden Gloves
- Kansas-Oklahoma Golden Gloves
- Michigan Golden Gloves
- Mid-South Golden Gloves
- Nevada Golden Gloves
- New England Golden Gloves
- New Jersey Golden Gloves
- New York Metro Golden Gloves
- Omaha Golden Gloves
- Pennsylvania Golden Gloves
- Rocky Mountain Golden Gloves
- Southeast Golden Gloves
- St. Louis Golden Gloves
- Texas Golden Gloves
- Toledo Golden Gloves
- Tri-State Golden Gloves
- Upper Midwest Golden Gloves
- Washington, D.C. Golden Gloves
- Wisconsin Golden Gloves

== Around the world ==
Other countries have similar amateur boxing awards, such as Mexico's Guantes De Oro (literally "Gloves of Gold" in Spanish).

== Diamond Belt ==
In the past, certain amateur tournaments would award the victor with a Diamond Belt as recognition of their amateur championship status. These tournaments were sponsored by various organizations and newspapers in the United States, with The Philadelphia Inquirer being one of the more notable. Notable Diamond Belt winners include George Foreman, Bobby Chacon, Jimmy McCarter, and Lou Brooks.

== BC Golden Gloves ==
The annual Golden Gloves tournament in British Columbia, Canada, has been a regular event since 1939. The first BC Golden Gloves champions were Alan Dunn, Bob Hickey, Travis Lepine, Eric Burnell, Henry Devine, Kenny Lindsay, Phil Vickery and Wayne Morris.

== Regional and special tournaments ==
From time to time, there have been special tournaments or regional Golden Gloves tournaments. One that operated from 1954 to the early Sixties was the Vancouver Island Golden Gloves. The first Vancouver Island Golden Boy was Victoria's Bert Wilkinson in 1954. Some of the history was documented in various issues of the Vancouver Island Boxing News in 1983, and the BC Amateur Boxing News between November 1983 and January 1986. A poster of the 1954 tournament and a photo of Bert Wilkinson were recently used in a video for the induction ceremony of the Greater Victoria Hall of Fame.

== See also ==
- Amateur boxing
- NCAA Boxing Championship
- Spanish Golden Gloves
- USA Boxing

Lists of former Golden Gloves champions, by division:

- List of U.S. national Golden Gloves super heavyweight champions
- List of U.S. national Golden Gloves heavyweight champions
- List of U.S. national Golden Gloves light heavyweight champions
- List of U.S. national Golden Gloves middleweight champions
- List of U.S. national Golden Gloves light middleweight champions
- List of U.S. national Golden Gloves welterweight champions
- List of U.S. national Golden Gloves light welterweight champions
- List of U.S. national Golden Gloves lightweight champions
- List of U.S. national Golden Gloves featherweight champions
- List of U.S. national Golden Gloves bantamweight champions
- List of U.S. national Golden Gloves flyweight champions
- List of U.S. national Golden Gloves light flyweight champions
