= Wladimir Klitschko vs. Samuel Peter II =

Boxing Match

Showdown In Frankfurt
- Date: 11 September 2010
- Venue: Waldstadion, Frankfurt, Hesse, Germany
- Title(s) on the line: IBF, WBO, IBO and The Ring heavyweight titles

Tale of the tape
Boxer	Wladimir Klitschko	Samuel Peter
Nickname	Dr. Steelhammer	The Nigerian Nightmare
Hometown	Kyiv, Ukraine	Akwa Ibom, Nigeria
Purse	€5,000,000 ($6,300,000)	
Pre-fight record	54–3 (47 KO)	34–3 (29 KO)
Age	34 years, 5 months	30 years
Height	6 ft 6 in (198 cm)	6 ft 2 in (188 cm)
Weight	247 lb (112 kg)	241 1/2 lb (110 kg)
Style	Orthodox	Orthodox
Recognition	IBF, WBO, IBO, and The Ring; Heavyweight Champion	IBF; No. 1 Ranked Heavyweight; WBO; No. 6 Ranked Heavyweight

Result
- Klitschko wins via 10th-round knockout

Wladimir Klitschko vs. Samuel Peter II was a professional boxing match contested on 11 September 2010, for the IBF, WBO, IBO, and The Ring heavyweight championship.

== Background ==
Following his stoppage victory over Eddie Chambers, Wladimir Klitschko called out WBA champion David Haye in April 2010, shortly after Haye had stopped John Ruiz, stating, "I want to send this message to boxing fans and directly to David Haye. David, you've bitched out on fighting both Klitschko brothers twice already and now's the time to make it happen. On behalf of the boxing fans around the world, I am officially calling you out to fight me. You can't run away from me forever and you need to follow through with this fight if you want to be respected. I'm ready. What're you waiting for?" Haye had been in line to face Vitali in summer 2009 before signing to face Wladimir on 20 June, however he pulled out with a back injury and was replaced with Ruslan Chagaev.

Klitschko and Haye entered into talks again for a September date, As the negotiations continued to move forward, with Wembley Stadium and Stamford Bridge being mentioned possible venues. The IBF set a deadline to end negotiations on 17 May, after which Wladimir would have to face their mandatory challenger Alexander Povetkin. A few days before the deadline, Haye said he was interested in fighting Vitali, rather than Wladimir.

On 17 May, the 30-day period of negotiation began for Klitschko to defend his championship against Povetkin. Within this period, discussions to make a fight with Haye were still ongoing. In July 2010, it was confirmed that the bout would be taking place in Frankfurt, with Samuel Peter replacing Povetkin for the scheduled fight as Povetkin failed to show up to the press-conference, deciding to pull out of the fight at the advice of his coach Teddy Atlas who believed Povetkin was not ready to face Klitschko. This was the second time Povetkin had pulled out of a bout with Klitschko as they had been set to fight in December 2008, before he was replaced with Hasim Rahman.

Peter had previously faced Klitschko in September 2005, before either of them had won a major world title, with Klitschko surviving three knockdowns to take a unanimous decision victory.

== The fight ==
Peter would start the fight aggressively and land a left hook to head in the opening round, although Klitschko would come on strong with a good right hand late. Klitschko stunned Peter in the second with a couple of right-left combinations. Peter focused on trying to duck inside the Klitschko jab, but he champion tied him up whenever he got close.

Klitschko's jab would continue to land, causing swelling around the right eye of Peter and an uppercut late in the sixth appeared to hurt the challenger. Klitschko would continue to dominate the action until the tenth when an uppercut followed by a left hook sent Peter down, referee Robert Byrd began a count before waving it off.

According to CompuBox Klitschko landed 142 punches with 28% accuracy, against Peter's 35 punches with 18% accuracy.

== Aftermath ==
Klitschko was next set to fight Derek Chisora on 11 December, but the fight was later called off on 8 December after Klitschko tore a muscle in his abdomen. The fight was rescheduled for 30 April 2011. However, on 4 March, it was announced that Klitschko had pulled out of the fight due to not being fully recovered from a torn abdominal muscle. The next day it was announced that the highly anticipated fight against Haye would take place on 2 July 2011.

Peter would be released from his Top Rank contract soon after. Despite this Peter's manager said they would look to secure other big fights in the division against anyone other than the Klitschko brothers.

== Undercard ==
Confirmed bouts:

== Broadcasting ==
Country	Broadcaster
Australia	Main Event
Canada	TSN
Denmark	TV2 Sport
Germany	RTL
Hungary	DigiSport
Ukraine	Inter
United Kingdom	Sky Sports
United States	ESPN

Preceded by vs. Eddie Chambers	Wladimir Klitschko's bouts 11 September 2010	Succeeded by vs. David Haye
Preceded by vs. Nagy Aguilera	Samuel Peter's bouts 11 September 2010	Succeeded by vs. Robert Helenius
