= Wladimir Klitschko =

Ukrainian boxer (born 1976)

- Володимир Кличко
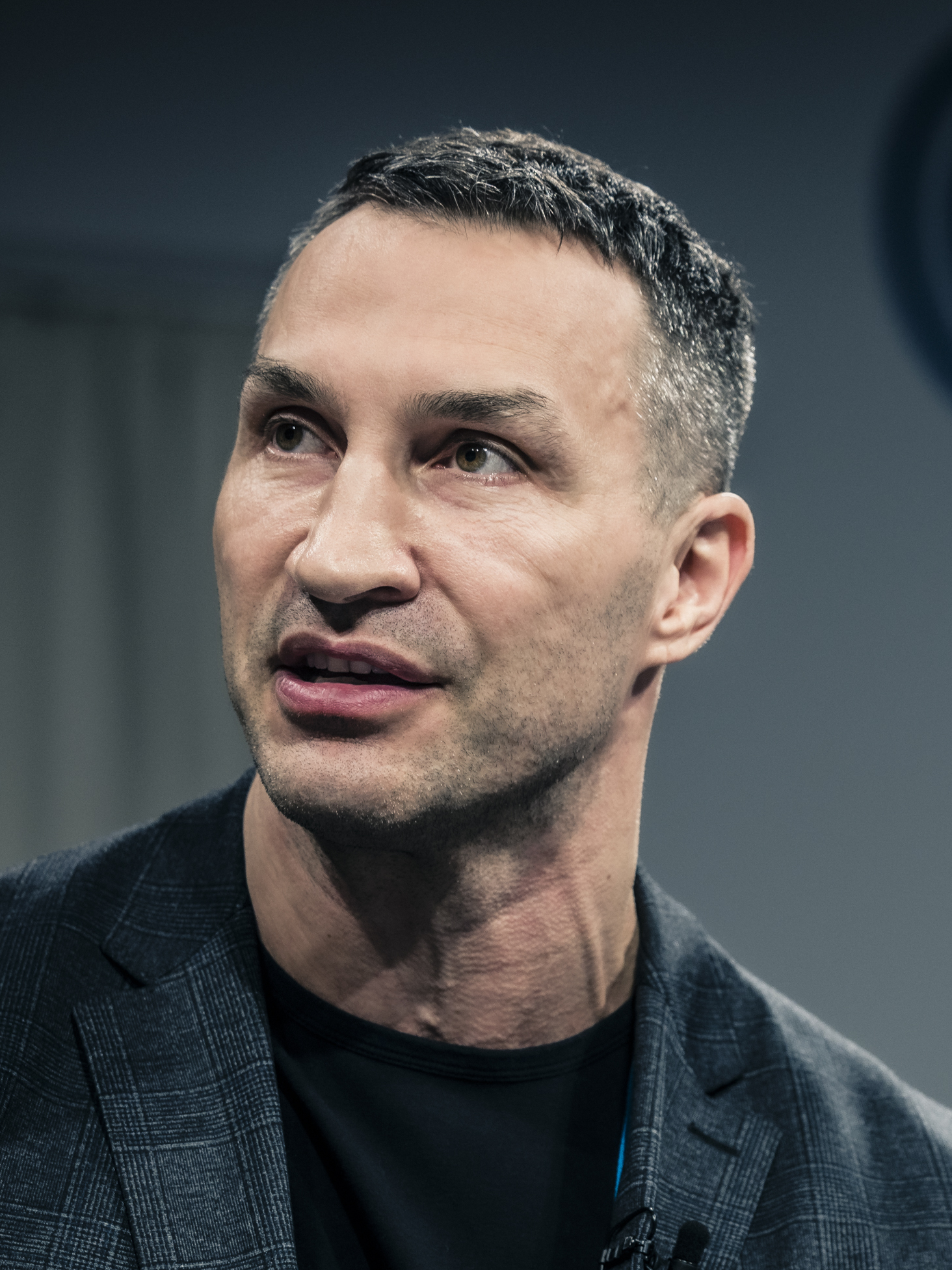
- Klitschko in 2023
- Born: 25 March 1976 (age 50); Semipalatinsk, Kazakh SSR, Soviet Union
- Partner: Hayden Panettiere (2009–2011; 2013–2018)
- Children: 1
- Relatives: Vitali Klitschko (brother)
- Military career
- Allegiance: Ukraine
- Branch: Ukrainian Ground Forces
- Service years: 2022–present
- Conflicts: Russo-Ukrainian War
- Boxing career
- Nickname: Dr. Steelhammer
- Height: 1.98 m (6 ft 6 in)
- Weight: Heavyweight
- Website: klitschko.com
- Reach: 206 cm (81 in)
- Stance: Orthodox

Boxing record
- Total fights: 69
- Wins: 64
- Win by KO: 53
- Losses: 5
Medal record
Men's amateur boxing
Representing Ukraine
Olympic Games
Gold medal – first place	1996 Atlanta	Super-heavyweight
European Championships
Silver medal – second place	1996 Vejle	Super-heavyweight
Junior European Championships
Gold medal – first place	1993 Saloniki	Heavyweight
Military World Championships
Gold medal – first place	1995 Ariccia	Heavyweight
Junior World Championships
Silver medal – second place	1994 Turkey	Heavyweight
Military World Games
Gold medal – first place	1995 Rome	Heavyweight

Wladimir Klitschko (Note: Wladimir Klitschko is a German transliteration of Russian: Владимир Кличко, IPA: [vɫɐˈdʲimʲɪr klʲɪt͡ɕˈko]; an equivalent English spelling is Vladimir Klichko /ˈklɪtʃkoʊ/. His full name in Ukrainian is: Володимир Володимирович Кличко, romanized: Volodymyr Volodymyrovych Klychko, IPA: [woloˈdɪmɪr woloˈdɪmɪrowɪtʃ klɪtʃˈkɔ].) (born 25 March 1976) is a Ukrainian former professional boxer who competed from 1996 to 2017. He held multiple heavyweight world championships between 2000 and 2015, including unified (Note: World Boxing Association (WBA) (Super version), International Boxing Federation (IBF), and World Boxing Organization (WBO) titles.) titles between 2008 and 2015. During this time he also held the International Boxing Organization (IBO) and Ring magazine titles. Klitschko is considered by some to be one of the greatest heavyweight champions ever. He was known for his exceptional knockout power, using a strong jab; straight right hand; and left hook, quick hand speed, formidable physical strength (which he often employed when clinching opponents), and his athletic footwork and mobility – unusual for boxers of his size.

As an amateur, Klitschko represented Ukraine at the 1996 Olympics, winning a gold medal in the super-heavyweight division and ending his amateur run with 134 wins and 6 losses. After turning professional later that year, he defeated Chris Byrd in 2000 to win the World Boxing Organization (WBO) heavyweight title. Klitschko's first reign as champion ended in an upset knockout loss to Corrie Sanders in 2003, which was followed by another upset knockout loss to Lamon Brewster in 2004. It was during this time that Klitschko hired Emanuel Steward as his trainer, which began an eight-year partnership that lasted until Steward's death in 2012. In particular, Steward was credited with Klitschko's transition from an aggressive puncher to a more defensively-oriented boxer, much as he had done with Lennox Lewis from 1995 to 2003.

From 2004 to 2015, Wladimir and his brother Vitali Klitschko (himself a multiple-time world champion) dominated heavyweight boxing, a period typically known as the "Klitschko Era" of the division. In 2006, Wladimir regained a portion of the world heavyweight championship after defeating Byrd in a rematch to win the International Boxing Federation (IBF) and IBO titles. He won his second WBO title by defeating Sultan Ibragimov in 2008. Following his defeat of Ruslan Chagaev in 2009, Klitschko was awarded the Ring title, and lastly he won the World Boxing Association (WBA) title (Unified version, later Super version) from David Haye in 2011.

During Klitschko's reign as world heavyweight champion, his fights would reportedly generate up to 500 million viewers worldwide. (Note: Attributed to multiple sources:) Klitschko holds all-time records for the longest time spent as world heavyweight champion at 4,382 days and most fighters beaten for the world heavyweight championship, at 23. (Note: Attributed to multiple sources:) He also holds records for the most wins and title defences of the unified championship (Note: WBA, WBC, IBF, and WBO era) in professional boxing history. In 2011, both Wladimir and Vitali entered the Guinness World Records book as brothers with most world heavyweight title fight wins (30 at the time; 40 as of 2020). Klitschko was inducted into the International Boxing Hall of Fame Class of 2021, having been elected in his first year of eligibility.

== Early life ==
Klitschko was born on 25 March 1976 in Semipalatinsk, Kazakh SSR, Soviet Union (Semey, Kazakhstan). He is the son of Nadiia Ulianivna Klychko (née Bulyno) and Volodymyr Rodionovych Klychko (1947–2011), a Soviet Air Force major general and a military attaché of USSR in East Germany. He is the younger brother of former WBC, WBO, and Ring magazine heavyweight champion Vitali Klitschko, the incumbent Mayor of Kyiv. Klitschko's paternal grandmother was Jewish.

The Klitschko brothers lived as children in Czechoslovakia from 1980 to 1985, where their father was stationed with the Soviet Forces. They attended a school designated for children of Soviet soldiers in the town of Mimoň in Northern Bohemia.

The Klitschko family lived in Pripyat, Ukrainian SSR from 1985 to 1986, when the town was evacuated following the Chernobyl nuclear disaster. The father was one of the commanders in charge of cleaning up the effects of the disaster in 1986 and was afterward diagnosed with cancer. He later served as a military attache at the embassy of Ukraine in Germany.

Both Wladimir and Vitali hold PhDs in sports science, with Wladimir's dissertation discussing how much training to give to young athletes between 14 and 19 based on the development of their bodies. As a reference to their PhDs, Wladimir is announced as "Dr. Steelhammer", a nickname similar to his brother, Vitali, who goes by "Dr. Ironfist".

== Amateur career ==
Klitschko started training in amateur boxing with Brovary Olympic Reserve School in the late 1980s. In the early 1990s, Klitschko was coached in Poland's Gwardia Warszawa boxing club, where, according to Jerzy Kulej, "He and his brother used to demolish our boys." In 1993, he won the Junior European Championships as a heavyweight. In 1994, he received 2nd place at the Junior World Championships in Istanbul, Turkey, losing to Cuban Michel López Núñez in the finals. In 1995, he won the gold medal at the Military Championships in Ariccia, Italy, defeating Luan Krasniqi, to whom he had lost in the third round of the World Championships in Berlin, Germany earlier that year. In 1996, he captured 2nd place as a Super Heavyweight at the European Championships in Vejle, Denmark losing to Alexei Lezin on points (1–6) in the finals. He defeated Lezin later that year on points (4–1) in the semi-finals at the 1996 Summer Olympics in Atlanta. Klitschko had an amateur record of 134 wins (65 KO) and 6 losses. Of his six amateur losses, two were by walkover (equivalent to a no-contest in a professional context), three were by points (to Michel López, Alexei Lezin, and Luan Krasniqi, all of whom he defeated in rematches), and one was by RSCI. The latter result happened at the 14th Copenhagen Cup - Copenhagen, Denmark - November 1993, when his bout with Don Diego Poeder was stopped in the first round due to a cut.

He first achieved world attention at the 1996 Summer Olympics in Atlanta, Georgia. He defeated Paea Wolfgramm to win the Super-Heavyweight gold medal.

=== Highlights ===
Below are the notable achievements of Wladimir Klitschko in amateur boxing:

(gold) Junior European Championships (91 kg), Thessaloniki, Greece, September–October 1993:

- 1/4: Defeated Irakli Fakadze (Georgia) 5–1
- 1/2: Defeated Valentin Savescu (Romania) RSC 2
- Finals: Defeated Sergey Lopatinskiy (Russia) 5–2

(bronze) Copenhagen Cup (91 kg), Copenhagen, Denmark, November 1993:

- 1/4: Defeated Ismael Kone (Sweden) 5–1
- 1/2: Lost to Don Diego Poeder (Netherlands) RSCI 1

(silver) Junior World Championships (91 kg), Istanbul, Turkey, September 1994:

- 1/8: Defeated Constantin Onofrei (Romania) 14–5
- 1/4: Defeated Rustam Tursenkhanov (Kazakhstan) 11–9
- 1/2: Defeated Andrey Kombarov (Russia) 8–4
- Finals: Lost to Michel López Núñez (Cuba) 2–7

(silver) World Military Championships (91 kg), Tunis, Tunisia, November 1994:

- 1/2: Defeated Mustafa Amir Amrou (Egypt) PTS
- Finals: Lost to René Monse (Germany) by walkover

(bronze) Chemistry Cup (91 kg), Halle, Germany, March 1995:

- 1/4: Defeated Wojciech Bartnik (Poland) 9–6
- 1/2: Lost to Peer Müller (Germany) by walkover

World Championships (91 kg), Berlin, Germany, May 1995:

- 1/16: Defeated Igor Kshinin (Russia) RSCI 2
- 1/8: Defeated Jan Bezvoda (Czech) 2–0
- 1/4: Lost to Luan Krasniqi (Germany) 2–6

(gold) Multi-Nations Tournament (+91 kg), Liverpool, England, June 1995:

- 1/4: Defeated Jean-François Bergeron (Canada) 10–2
- 1/2: Defeated Rod Allen (England) 9–0
- Finals: Defeated Paolo Vidoz (Italy) DQ 2

(gold) World Military Games (91 kg), Ariccia, Italy, September 1995:

- 1/8: Defeated Song-Geoi Jang (North Korea) 14–2
- 1/4: Defeated Igor Kshinin (Russia) RSC 2
- 1/2: Defeated Sinan Şamil Sam (Turkey) 12–2
- Finals: Defeated Luan Krasniqi (Germany) 13–12

(gold) Strandzha Cup (+91 kg), Sofia, Bulgaria, February 1996:

- 1/4: Defeated Svilen Rusinov (Bulgaria) 5–4
- 1/2: Defeated Jean-François Bergeron (Canada) RSC 1
- Finals: Defeated Paolo Vidoz (Italy) 7–2

(silver) European Championships (+91 kg), Vejle, Denmark, March 1996:

- 1/8: Defeated Sean Murphy (Ireland) DQ 2
- 1/4: Defeated Adalat Mamedov (Azerbaijan) RSC 3
- 1/2: Defeated Attila Levin (Sweden) 7–0
- Finals: Lost to Alexei Lezin (Russia) 1–6

(gold) Olympic Games (+91 kg), Atlanta, Georgia, June 1996:

- 1/8: Defeated Lawrence Clay-Bey (United States) 10–8
- 1/4: Defeated Attila Levin (Sweden) RSC 1
- 1/2: Defeated Alexei Lezin (Russia) 4–1
- Finals: Defeated Paea Wolfgramm (Tonga) 7–3

== Professional career ==
"Wladimir hits very hard, harder than (Mike) Tyson. At one point, they ran twelve 800-meter [roughly a half mile] sprints, each under 3 minutes, with a minute rest between each one. I timed every one and every one was under 3 minutes. I never saw a heavyweight do anything even close to that. They work their asses off. To be able to do that, two 250-pound guys – whew. They're two of the best athletes I've ever trained."

— Freddie Roach, who trained both the Klitschko brothers and Mike Tyson, on the athleticism of the brothers.

=== Early career ===
Klitschko turned professional with Universum Box-Promotion in Hamburg under the tutelage of Fritz Sdunek, often being featured on fight cards alongside his elder brother Vitali. After building an undefeated record of 24–0 with 21 KOs, he suffered his first loss to 24–13–1 Ross Puritty, in what was Klitschko's first and only professional fight in Ukraine. Puritty forced Klitschko, who had at that time not gone beyond eight rounds, to punch himself out. Klitschko began to be overwhelmed in the tenth round and went down twice but was allowed to continue. At the start of the eleventh round, with Puritty continuing to land hard punches, Klitschko's trainer, Fritz Sdunek, entered the ring and stopped the fight. Three years later, Klitschko's brother Vitali stopped Puritty in the eleventh round himself. On 18 March 2000, Klitschko fought Paea Wolfgramm, whom he fought previously in the 1996 super-heavyweight Olympic finals. In their professional rematch, Klitschko knocked Wolfgramm out in the first round.

=== Klitschko vs. Byrd, Jefferson, Shufford ===
Wladimir Klitschko got his chance to fight for the world heavyweight championship on 14 October 2000 against WBO champion Chris Byrd. Byrd, considered one of the most avoided fighters in the heavyweight division at the time, won the title six months earlier on 1 April from Wladimir's brother Vitali (who had a perfect record of 27 fights, 27 wins, 27 KOs coming into the fight), being a late replacement for Donovan Ruddock. In that fight, Byrd was trailing on the scorecards (83–88, 83–88, & 82–89) but was declared the winner after Vitali retired on his stool between 9th and 10th rounds due to shoulder injury. Byrd's title defence against Wladimir was scheduled to take place at Kölnarena in Cologne and was billed as "Revenge Of The Brother". In a fight that was aired on pay-per-view in the United Kingdom, Wladimir won the WBO world heavyweight title from Byrd by a wide unanimous decision (UD) with scores of 120–106, 119–107, and 118–108, flooring his opponent twice.

Klitschko's first defence of the WBO title came on 24 March 2001 against Derrick Jefferson. Jefferson, regarded as a big and athletic brawler and a fan-friendly attraction, was coming into the bout with a record of 23 wins in 26 bouts, with 19 of those wins coming inside the distance (18 of them inside the first three rounds, 11 of them - in the first round). Jefferson was mostly known for the sixth-round knockout (KO) of Maurice Harris, which was named The Ring Knockout of the Year in 1999. He was 4–2 in the last six fights, losing by technical knockout (TKO) to David Izon, in a fight he was winning on the scorecards but punched himself out, and Oleg Maskaev in round four after breaking an ankle during the first knockdown in the first round.

For the bout, Jefferson weighed in at 260.25 lbs, the heaviest in his professional career and 20 pounds heavier than in his previous bout. The additional weight appeared to be muscle. The fight lasted only two rounds. In the first round, Klitschko knocked Jefferson down with a short left hook. After the first round Jefferson's left eye was swollen. Klitschko knocked him down twice more in round two, once with a straight right hand and again with another left hook, with the fight being stopped after the last knockdown, declaring Klitschko the winner by TKO in the second round. Klitschko earned $1 million for the fight.

Klitschko's next title defence was scheduled less than five months later on 4 August 2001. The fight took place at the Mandalay Bay Events Center in Paradise, Nevada against hometown fighter, Charles Shufford. At the time, Shufford had a 17–1 record, coming off of wins against Jimmy Thunder and Lamon Brewster. Shufford weighed in at 234 lbs., 17 pounds lighter than in his previous bout. Shufford, having played George Foreman opposite Will Smith in the movie Ali, entered the ring with Smith by his side. Klitschko knocked Shufford down three times, once in round two, once in round three (both times with a straight right hand) and in round six with a left hook, with referee stopping the bout after the third knockdown. According to punch stats, Klitschko landed 58 of 262 punches (22%) and Shufford connected on 16 of 190 (8%).

=== Klitschko vs. Botha, Mercer, McCline ===
Klitschko returned to Germany for the next defence of his WBO title against Francois Botha. The fight took place at Hanns-Martin-Schleyer-Halle in Stuttgart, the same venue where Botha had fought Axel Schulz for the IBF title six years earlier, in the most watched boxing match in German TV history. According to Botha's coach Abel Sanchez, Botha was in the best shape of his career. The South African contender was game in the opening rounds, trying to catch Klitschko with the right hook, but Klitschko was successfully keeping him at the end of his jab. In the eighth round, Klitschko caught him with a counter right hand and then hit Botha with several shots, knocking him down with a left hook. Botha got up, but was unsteady on his feet and had both eyes swollen, proceeding the referee to stop the bout.

Klitschko had his next title defence scheduled three months later, on 29 June 2002 at Etess Arena in Atlantic City, New Jersey, against former WBO heavyweight titleholder Ray Mercer. It was the first time in his professional career that Klitschko fought an Olympic Gold medalist. 41-year-old Mercer, having fought Lennox Lewis and Evander Holyfield throughout his career, was expected to be a tough challenge for Klitschko that would give him and Lennox Lewis, the WBC and The Ring champion, a second common opponent (along with Francois Botha) and a bout comparable to Lewis vs. Tyson. During the build-up to the bout, Mercer referred to Klitschko as "Russian Tommy Morrison". Since his comeback in 2001, Mercer had won four fights over journeymen, three of them inside two rounds, prior to the Klitschko bout.

Klitschko dominated Mercer throughout the entire bout, stopping Mercer in the sixth round. At 2:48 of the first round, Klitschko dropped Mercer with a left hook, becoming only the second man to drop Mercer. Throughout the fight, Klitschko was frequently landing combinations of stiff left jabs, left hooks, and straight right hands. By the fifth round, Mercer's face was swollen and his right eye was cut. In the sixth, Klitschko unleashed a barrage of punches, prompting the referee to stop the bout. Klitschko became the first fighter to defeat Mercer inside the distance. According to CompuBox statistics, Klitschko landed 193 total punches out of 429 thrown (104 power punches out of 167), while Mercer landed 54 shots out of 124 (only 5 power punches landed out of 10 thrown).

Klitschko returned to Mandalay Bay Event Center for his sixth defence on 7 December 2002 against Jameel McCline. McCline, having made his professional boxing debut in 1995, became an established contender after defeating Michael Grant, knocking him down with the first punch thrown and ultimately stopping him in 43 seconds. Prior to fighting Klitschko, McCline had defeated two more heavyweight contenders, Lance Whitaker and Shannon Briggs, by wide unanimous decisions. Being 6 ft 6 in tall with an 82 in reach, McCline was of similar height and longer reach than Klitschko, while also being 22 lbs heavier. Many opinion polls gave Klitschko a 60–40 advantage over McCline. The fight was the main event of the card that also featured Floyd Mayweather Jr. defending the WBC lightweight title against Jose Luis Castillo.

The fight turned out to be tentative, with Klitschko winning almost every round using his jab and superior footwork. At the end of the tenth round, Klitschko staggered McCline with a barrage of left hooks and overhand rights, and ultimately knocked him down with a left-right combination. Before the start of the eleventh round, McCline's corner threw in the towel, giving Klitschko his 36th career win by stoppage. At the time of the stoppage, the scorecards were 98–91, 99–90 (twice), all in favour of the champion. CompuBox stats showed that Klitschko landed 181 of his 433 punches thrown (42%), and McCline landed 61 of 307 (20%).

The following week after Klitschko's win over McCline, Chris Byrd, whom Klitschko defeated for the WBO world title, beat Evander Holyfield to become IBF world champion.

=== Klitschko vs. Sanders, Brewster ===
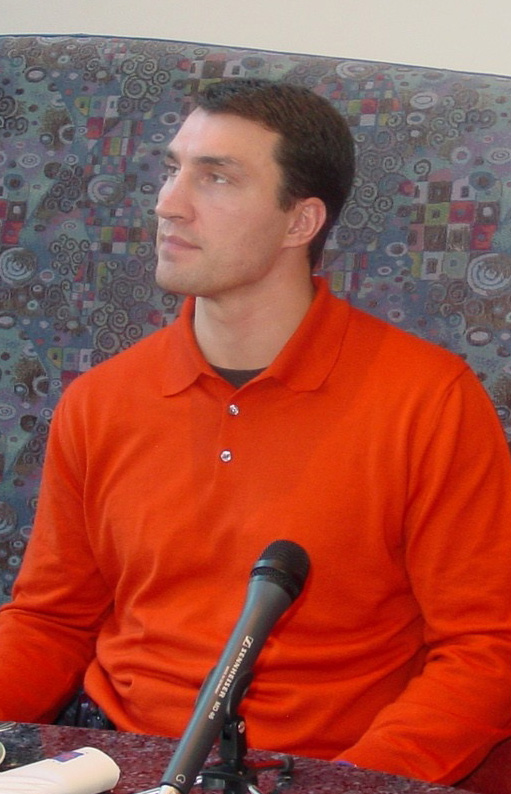
Klitschko in 2004

After failing to reach agreements with Kirk Johnson, Fres Oquendo, Lou Savarese and Danny Williams, Universum ultimately signed a 4-fight contract with Corrie Sanders, who was ranked No.9 contender by WBO at the time. According to the agreement, Sanders' first fight was going to be for the WBO world heavyweight title. The fight was scheduled to take place on 8 March 2003 in Hanover, Germany. Klitschko later admitted that he came to the fight unmotivated and was already thinking about the vacation he was going to enjoy after the fight. Klitschko suffered an upset TKO loss to Sanders. With thirty seconds left in the opening round, Wladimir threw a jab but Sanders countered with a big left hook, prompting Klitschko to enter a clinch. While in the clinch, Sanders landed another left hook that sent Klitschko to the canvas. Klitschko got up but was dropped again almost immediately. The following round, Sanders continued his assault on a visibly hurt Klitschko, dropping him twice more at the beginning of the round. The referee waived it off after the fourth knockdown. The fight was named Upset of the Year by The Ring for 2003.

After winning two minor bouts in Germany and enlisting the services of boxing trainer Emanuel Steward, Klitschko again fought for the vacant WBO title on 10 April 2004, in Las Vegas, against Lamon Brewster. Klitschko dominated Brewster through the course of the first four rounds, sending him to the canvas in the fourth; however, things turned around in the fifth when Klitschko began tiring and Brewster's punches began backing him up. Not defending himself and leaning into ropes for support, Klitschko took a standing eight count. On unsteady legs, Klitschko fell to the canvas after the bell and the referee stopped the fight for his safety. When talking about the fight, Emmanuel Steward said: "Wladimir was in incredible shape. I've never seen anything like this in my career. I know what it looks like when a boxer is getting hurt from punches. There was definitely something else that caused problems for Wladimir".

Shortly after the fight Klitschko was rushed into hospital. An examination showed Klitschko's blood sugar level almost two times higher than the permissible norm. According to members of Klitschko's team, the doctor told them that Klitschko had been "inches away" from falling into a diabetic coma, and that with blood sugar level that high, Klitschko would have been incapable of handling a single proper training session. After returning from the examination to the hotel, he fell ill with nausea, followed by physical weakness.

Judd Bernstein, the lawyer representing Klitschko, suggested that he was a victim of an ongoing fight fixing in Las Vegas (which also included fraudulent medical reports), which was investigated by FBI at the time. Bernstein pointed out that in the last 48 hours before the beginning of the fight, the betting odds in favour of Klitschko rapidly dropped from 11-to-1 to 3,5-to-1 suggesting somebody knew that Brewster had an unfair advantage in the fight. Dr Margaret Goodman, the chairwoman of the Nevada State Athletic Commission's medical advisory board and Nevada's chief ringside physician was in the ring and attending to Klitschko seconds after the referee stopped the fight. Her initial diagnosis of a Grade 3 concussion was confirmed at the hospital after further tests. Goodman was sceptical of the theory that Klitschko had been drugged.

After the fight, Wladimir's cutman Joe Souza was fired. During the fight, Souza used vaseline on Wladimir's face but also body, which had never been done in any of Klitschko's previous fights. As a replacement, the team hired Jacob "Stitch" Duran.

=== Klitschko vs. Williamson, Castillo, Peter ===
Following his loss to Brewster, Klitschko began his journey back towards the top of the heavyweight division. First, he faced hard-hitting DaVarryl Williamson. The fight took place at Caesars Palace in Las Vegas, Nevada. Williamson dropped Klitschko forty seconds into the second round, but was outboxed throughout the rest of the bout. An accidental head butt in the closing seconds of the fifth round caused Klitschko bleeding from a cut above his right eye. Due to the cut, the fight was prematurely stopped, with Klitschko being declared the winner by technical decision. Two of the judges scored the fight identically 49–46 in favour of Klitschko, while the third judge had Williamson winning 48–47.

After defeating Eliseo Castillo by fourth-round TKO, Klitschko signed to fight Samuel Peter in an IBF and WBO eliminator. Coming into the bout, Klitschko was viewed by many as the underdog against the 7-to-5 favourite Peter who had won all of his 24 fights, with 21 of them having ended inside the distance. At the time, Samuel Peter was considered one of the brightest prospects in the heavyweight division. Distinguished boxing coaches Angelo Dundee and Teddy Atlas expected Peter to win. Wladimir's team, including his brother Vitali, were worried about Wladimir, and were against this fight to happen. Wladimir, however, insisted on fighting Peter, claiming that beating a feared, hard-hitting fighter like Samuel Peter would help him to regain his stock and become mandatory challenger for two heavyweight belts.

The first four rounds were tentative, with Klitschko working behind the jab, not allowing Peter to close the distance. At the end of the third, Peter staggered Klitschko with a powerful left hook. He hurt Klitschko again in the fifth with another left hook, sending Klitschko to the canvas with the rabbit punch. The referee counted it as the knockdown. Peter immediately went for the attack after Klitschko got up, dropping him again with the rabbit punch. The referee scored it as the second knockdown. Klitschko regained composure and outboxed Peter through sixth to ninth rounds, with Peter frequently trying to hit Klitschko with the rabbit punch whenever escaping from a clinch. Near the end of the tenth round Peter staggered Wladimir with a hard right hand, eventually sending Klitschko to the canvas with another right when Wladimir was backing away. In the 11th and 12th rounds, Klitschko was trying to keep Peter at the distance using straight punches. Peter caught him with a left hook in the last round, but was unable to capitalise on it. Instead, Klitschko caught him with a hard counter left hook of his own, staggering Peter for the first time in the fight. Eventually the bout went the distance, with Klitschko winning the fight by clear unanimous decision (UD). All the judges scored the bout identically 114–111.

=== Klitschko vs. Byrd II, Brock, Austin ===
On 22 April 2006, in Mannheim, Germany, Klitschko faced Chris Byrd for a second time, this time for the IBF heavyweight title. At the time of the bout, Byrd was ranked as the best heavyweight by The Ring, while Klitschko was ranked eighth. Coming into the fight, Klitschko was viewed as the favourite. Many observers expected Klitschko to dominate Byrd similarly to their first bout.

April 22nd, 2006 may be one of the most momentous dates in the history of boxing. On that day, Wladimir Klitschko of Ukraine will most likely easily defeat Chris Byrd of the United States for Byrd's IBF heavyweight title. If that result occurs, it may mark the dawning of a new era in boxing. Three of the four major titlists will be from Eastern Europe. Like the flood waters of Hurricane Katrina that swept away much of New Orleans, a rising tidal wave of Eastern European fighters threatens to sweep away American supremacy in the heavyweight division, putting an end to an era that began with the reign of John L. Sullivan — 124 years ago.

(John Hively, boxingscene.com)

Klitschko defeated Byrd by TKO in the seventh round, becoming a two-time heavyweight world champion in the process. Klitschko dominated the fight using his jab and superior reach, knocking Byrd down twice, once in round five and once in round seven. Byrd beat the count after the second knockdown, but his face was battered and bloody, and the fight was waved off. At the time of the stoppage, judge Roy Francis had the challenger winning every round, while two other judges, Steve Epstein and Robert Hoyle, gave Klitschko all but one round.

In his first title defence, Klitschko agreed to face then-undefeated heavyweight contender Calvin Brock. With a record of 29–0, 22 KOs, Brock was considered one of the most promising and demanded American heavyweight prospects at the time. In an ESPN interview in July 2005, Mike Tyson named him and Samuel Peter as his favourite fighters from the new crop of heavyweights. In the build-up, Brock expressed confidence in his abilities: "I can adopt to every style. He's big like Jameel McCline, but a better fighter. I will beat him and become the heavyweight champion of the world. Klitschko has a good jab, but they also said Timur's best weapon was his jab. I have a good jab myself. I can adapt to anybody's style, anybody's strength and turn their weapon against them." He also dismissed claims that the division lacks strong competition: "The heavyweight division is stacked with a bunch of talent. It's not weak, definitely not weak. The division is pretty strong and that's why the title keeps changing hands."

The fight took place on 11 November 2006 at Madison Square Garden. In the opening rounds, Brock's economical but effective movement made Klitschko reluctant to throw punches, with Wladimir not being able to fully establish his rhythm. In between the third and fourth rounds, Klitschko's trainer Emmanuel Steward urged Wladimir to press the action. Klitschko started fighting more aggressively, hurting Brock several times with the right cross. In the fifth round, Brock opened a cut under Klitschko's left eye that started bleeding heavily in the sixth. In the seventh round, Wladimir caught Brock with a counter right hand before sending him to the canvas with another straight right. Brock was able to get up but was unsteady on his feet, prompting the referee to stop the bout.

Klitschko then faced mandatory challenger Ray Austin on 10 March 2007, at the SAP Arena in Mannheim, Germany. 36-year-old Austin was mostly known for draws against Sultan Ibragimov, Larry Donald and Lance Whitaker. In preparation for the fight, Austin was trained by a prominent coach Stacey McKinley. Klitschko won by a second-round KO with four consecutive left hooks to Austin's head. Klitschko did not throw a single right hand in that fight.

=== Klitschko vs. Brewster II, Ibragimov, Thompson ===
Klitschko then avenged one of his previous losses as he defeated Lamon Brewster on 7 July 2007, in Cologne, Germany. Brewster's corner asked the referee to stop the fight at the end of the sixth round. It was later revealed that Klitschko fought most of the fight with a broken middle finger on his left hand.

By the end of October 2007, Wladimir Klitschko started negotiations with then-WBO world heavyweight champion Sultan Ibragimov about the unification showdown in the near future. This would be the first heavyweight unification fight since 13 November 1999 when WBC champion Lennox Lewis defeated then-WBA and IBF champion Evander Holyfield. On 20 November, Klitschko and Ibragimov officially signed the contract for their unification clash to take place on 23 February 2008 at Madison Square Garden. Two days later in Moscow, a first pre-fight press-conference was held. Klitschko began his preparations for the fight on 18 December. His training camp was located between Santa Monica, Los Angeles and Palm Beach, Florida. Ibragimov began his preparations for the bout on 25 December. Among Ibragimov's sparring partners were Klitschko's former opponent Jameel McCline and Swedish heavyweight prospect Attila Levin.

In the pre-fight prediction, a vast majority of Ukrainian, Russian and American observers expected Klitschko to win by either stoppage or unanimous decision. Out of six journalists of the Ukrainian magazine Ring, five predicted Klitschko to stop Ibragimov, with only one expecting Klitschko to win by decision. 24 of 26 members of boxingscene.com expected Klitschko to come out as the winner – 18 of them predicted the win to come by way of KO/TKO, one expert predicted decision, while the remaining five were unsure about either possibility. The remaining two experts predicted Ibragimov to win by decision. 10 of the 12 members of ringsidereport.com picked Klitschko to win, with eight of them expecting the victory to come by way of KO/TKO. The remaining two picked Ibragimov to win by stoppage. In the build-up to the fight, Klitschko's trainer Emmanuel Steward said that Sultan Ibragimov was going to be Wladimir's toughest opponent to date, praising Ibragimov for his hand speed and mobility, while Klitschko complimented Ibragimov on his accomplishments: "Sultan Ibragimov is a boxer that hasn't lost in any of his 23 fights, with the sole draw being against Ray Austin. His amateur career can be described as fantastic, and the fact that he's the heavyweight champion of the world speaks volumes about his professional career as well. I think he's a strong and dangerous opponent that should not be underestimated. His last two fights against Shannon Briggs and Evander Holyfield proved that." Ibragimov's trainer Jeff Mayweather was confident that Ibragimov would be able to establish his rhythm and "press Klitschko to the corner". The pre-fight build-up was marked with controversy after Ibragimov's manager Boris Grinberg insulted Klitschko during one of the interviews: "Sultan Ibragimov knocks out this Ukraine gay, motherf***er!". Grinberg later apologised to Klitschko. The day before the bout, Klitschko weighed in at 238 pounds (108 kg), the lightest since 1999, while Ibragimov's weight was 219 pounds (99 kg), his lightest since 2005.

From the opening bell, both fighters fought tentatively, avoiding risks. Klitschko retreated onto the outside, fighting at a distance and remaining unreachable for Ibragimov who tried to establish his right jab but had his right hand constantly pushed down by Klitschko. By the end of the opening round, Klitschko became more active with his jab, while Ibragimov unsuccessfully tried to catch Wladimir with a series of right and left hooks. By the third round, Klitschko took control of the center of the ring, keeping Ibragimov at the end of his left jab and occasionally throwing right jabs as well. In the fifth round, Klitschko caught Ibragimov with a straight right hand, however Ibragimov appeared to be unhurt. Most of Ibragimov's attempts to close distance ended with Klitschko tying him up. In the second half of the fight, the situation did not change, with Klitschko keeping Ibragimov at distance with straight shots, while Ibragimov was only able to occasionally catch Klitschko with single shots to the body. Ibragimov's corner was almost silent from the sixth round onwards, unable to give their man any meaningful advice. Klitschko's dominance became even more visible after he caught Ibragimov with a straight right in round nine, almost knocking him down. He caught Ibragimov again with a counter left hook at the end of the eleventh. The twelfth round saw Ibragimov unsuccessfully trying to catch Klitschko with overhand shots. Ultimately, the fight went the distance, with Klitschko being declared the winner by unanimous decision. The judges scored the bout 119–110, 117–111 and 118–110. Klitschko reportedly earned $9 million for the fight. He donated $500,000 of his earnings to the Bronx's Laureus Sport for Good Foundation.

The fight was heavily criticised by observers and prominent boxing public figures. Boxing promoter Bob Arum called the fight "an absolute shame", while Dan Goossen described it as "awful". Boxing journalist Phil Santos pointed out that Klitschko fought for the majority of the fight "only with his left hand", proving once again that he "is the best heavyweight in the world right now". Santos also noted that such cautious, safety-first style was not going to help Klitschko to increase his popularity in the United States. Some observers were more apologetic of Klitschko's performance: "It's really irritating that so many people, people that know very little about boxing, say that Klitschko's dominance means stagnation for the heavyweight division. There's no denying that once Klitschko collects all the belts, he will go down as one of the all-time greats. Yes, he fights cautiously and isn't willing to exchange shots, but who told us that greatness in boxing is measured with the number of knockdowns? Why the boxer that is able to not get hit with a hard shot over the course of twelve rounds is less great than the champions from the past that sacrificed their health for the sake of success?"

On 12 July 2008, Klitschko faced mandatory challenger Tony Thompson. The fight took place at Color Line Arena in Hamburg, Germany, the same venue where Thompson had defeated then-highly regarded German boxer Luan Krasniqi in a WBO world heavyweight title eliminator almost a year prior. In the build-up to the fight, Klitschko praised Thompson for his defensive abilities, while Klitschko's trainer Emmanuel Steward described Thompson as "one of the most difficult fights we will have". In the pre-fight interview, Thompson promised that he wouldn't run away from Klitschko, and would stand in front of him and fight toe-to-toe. Being 6 ft 5 in tall with 81½ in reach, Thompson was of similar height and reach as Klitschko. Many observes predicted Thompson to be a tough challenge for Klitschko, expecting Klitschko to ultimately win by TKO in the second half of the fight before the fighters would enter the championship rounds. Coming into the fight, Klitschko weighed in at 241 pounds, 6.5 lbs lighter than Thompson.

The opening rounds were tentative, with Klitschko seemingly struggling with Thompson's awkward southpaw style. All three judges gave the first round to Thompson. In the second round, both fighters suffered a cut above the right eye after an accidental headbutt. Klitschko's eye began to swell after Thompson caught him with the right hook in the fifth round. After the sixth round, however, Klitschko appeared to have established his dominance in the ring, hurting Thompson with several straight right hands. After the seventh round, both fighters started showing signs of fatigue. In the tenth round, Thompson fell to the canvas during a clinch. It appeared as if Thompson fell down mostly due to being tired rather than being pushed by Klitschko. In the middle of the eleventh, Klitschko caught Thompson with the straight right hand which Thompson did not see coming, falling to the canvas again, with the referee starting the count this time. Thompson beat the count but was unsteady on his feet, prompting the referee to stop the fight. At the time of the stoppage, Klitschko was unanimously winning on the scorecards, with scores 98–92 (twice) and 99–91.

In the post-fight interview, Klitschko admitted that the fight turned out to be tougher than expected: "It is not so easy to defend all the titles and it has been a while since I last had a black eye so today I really look like a boxer. I did not expect the victory to come that hard." "I was fatigued, I thought he was fatigued too," Tony Thompson said after the fight. "He did what a great champion did, he took advantage when I was vulnerable. The only thing that hurts on me is my heart – for losing." Emmanuel Steward described the knockout sequence as the one that showed the difference between a great heavyweight and the best heavyweight in the world: "They were both tired, but Wladimir has experience now, then he came back with a second wind. The experience is what helped Wladimir to come back with the second wind and find an opportunity to secure the stoppage win." Former undisputed world heavyweight champion Lennox Lewis praised Klitschko for his performance: "I've been watching Klitschko for some time, and he's improving with every fight." Meanwhile, unified world cruiserweight champion David Haye criticised the champion for his performance: "If he fights me in the same way he fought that guy he will be knocked out in three rounds. He has got the perfect style for me. I don't want him to have any more fights before me as I don't want someone else to do what I will do against him." Klitschko reportedly earned €8 million ($12.4 million) for the bout.

=== Klitschko vs. Rahman, Chagaev, Chambers ===
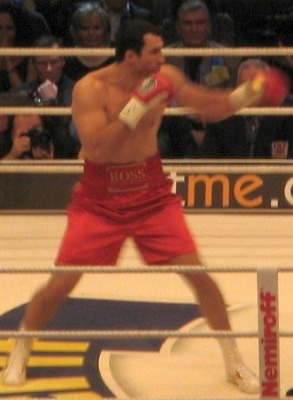
Klitschko vs. Rahman, 2008

Klitschko was scheduled to defend his titles against Alexander Povetkin later in 2008, but on 25 October, Povetkin withdrew from the fight due to an ankle injury. Instead, Klitschko faced Hasim Rahman on 13 December 2008 and won by TKO. This was the third time Klitschko fought at the SAP Arena in Mannheim, Germany. He dominated the fight, winning every round while making good use of his left jab. Rahman seemed unable to withstand the Klitschko's punch power. In the sixth round, Klitschko knocked Rahman down with a series of left hooks, leaving Rahman visibly disoriented. Between the sixth and seventh rounds, the referee warned Rahman he's going to stop the fight if Rahman continues absorbing punishment without firing back. The referee ultimately called a stop to the contest in the 7th round after Rahman failed to respond to a series of shots. At the time of the stoppage, Klitschko was leading on all three judges scorecards, respectively 60–53, 60–53, and 60–47. According to CompuBox, Klitschko landed 194 punches (50.4% accuracy) to Rahman's 35 (16.8% accuracy), a nearly six-fold disparity.

Klitschko was scheduled to face David Haye on 20 June 2009, but Haye pulled out within weeks of the fight complaining of a back injury. Immediately after news about Haye's injury broke into public, a handful of heavyweight fighters, such as Alexander Povetkin, Chazz Witherspoon, James Toney, Odlanier Solis, Dominick Guinn and Eddie Chambers, expressed their interest in replacing Haye for the Klitschko showdown. Instead, Klitschko's team started negotiations with Ruslan Chagaev, who was ranked third best heavyweight in the world by The Ring, and WBA world champion Nikolai Valuev, who was regarded as a big draw in Germany at the time. Ultimately, Klitschko reached agreements with Chagaev who agreed to step in for Haye as a last-minute replacement (Valuev's team wanted the fight to be postponed until autumn of that year). Some observers believed that Chagaev was a better challenge for Klitschko than Haye, given his position in the ranking and the fact that, alongside WBO and IBF world titles, vacant The Ring world heavyweight title was also on the line. In the pre-fight comparison, The Ring was giving Klitschko an advantage in power, speed and athletic ability, as well as experience, while also crediting Chagaev for having better defence, praising him for his fundamentals and footwork. In terms of technique, both fighters were described as of equal level.

The fight took place at Veltins Arena in Gelsenkirchen, with over 61,000 fans having attended the fight, the largest audience for a boxing fight in Germany since 1939, when Max Schmeling knocked out Adolf Heuser in front of 70,000 people in Stuttgart. Klitschko dominated the fight, keeping Chagaev at the end of his jab and throwing straight right hand whenever necessary. Klitschko dropped Chagaev near the end of the second round, and was gradually fighting more aggressively as the fight progressed. Chagaev's trainer Michael Timm did not allow Chagaev to come out for the tenth round, prompting the referee to wave the bout off, declaring Klitschko the winner by corner retirement (RTD). This win had added significance because even though the WBA title was not on the line, many saw Klitschko as the rightful champion.

On 9 December 2009, Klitschko's management group, K2 Promotions, confirmed that a bout with Eddie Chambers had been agreed to take place in Germany on 20 March 2010. This mandatory title defence, originally scheduled for December 2009, had to be delayed due to a hand injury that Klitschko sustained in training that required surgery. In the build-up to the fight, Klitschko described Chambers as "the best American heavyweight right now". In the pre-fight comparison of the fighters, The Ring gave Chambers the upper hand in speed and athletic ability, as well as defence, while crediting Klitschko as more powerful and experienced. In the United States, the bout was not televised by any TV station but was aired on the Klitschko's official website for $14.95 instead. The official venue was the multi-functional football stadium ESPRIT Arena in Düsseldorf, Germany.

The bout turned-out to be one-sided, with the champion winning rounds keeping Chambers at the end of his jab and occasionally throwing straight right hands. In the opening rounds, Chambers lifted Klitschko and took him down several times but was not deducted a point nor warned. In between the championship rounds, Klitschko was criticised by his trainer Emmanuel Steward for not fighting aggressively, despite comfortably winning on the scorecards. Klitschko picked up his pace during the final round and, with few seconds left, landed a left hook on Chambers' temple. The punch made Chambers fall forwards and lose consciousness for an extended period of time. The referee immediately stepped in and called an end to the contest. Not counting revenue from advertising, Klitschko reportedly earned at least €6 million, or $8.12 million, for the fight. It remains the only stoppage loss of Chambers' career.

=== Klitschko vs. Peter II ===
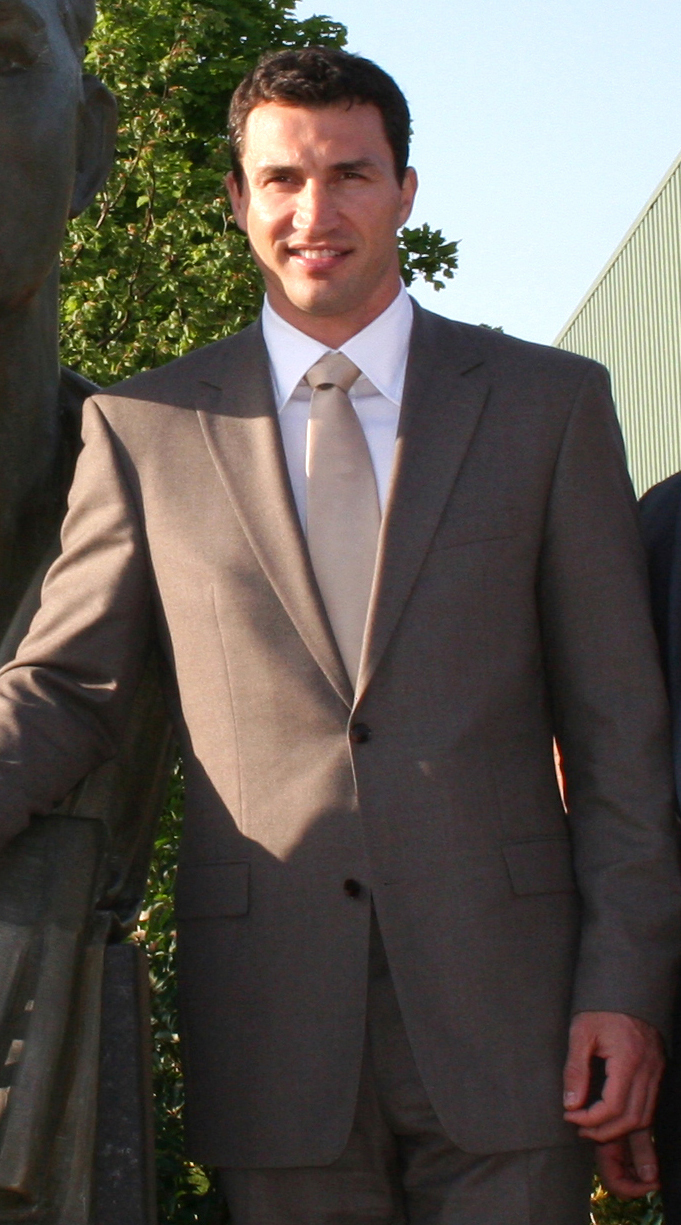
Klitschko in 2010

Following the match with Chambers, a unification fight between Klitschko and David Haye, who, as of November 2009, had held the WBA title, appeared to be in the offing. Klitschko called out the Briton on YouTube in April 2010, stating, "I want to send this message to boxing fans and directly to David Haye. David, you've bitched out on fighting both Klitschko brothers twice already and now's the time to make it happen. On behalf of the boxing fans around the world, I am officially calling you out to fight me. You can't run away from me forever and you need to follow through with this fight if you want to be respected. I'm ready. What're you waiting for?"

Haye's trainer, Adam Booth, indicated that Haye would be willing to accept the challenge. Both sides began negotiations for a potential fight and the bout was targeted for September. As the negotiations continued to move forward, the unification fight between Klitschko and Haye was expected to take place in Germany rather than England. The IBF set a deadline to end negotiations on 17 May. A few days before the deadline, Haye said he was interested in fighting the older Klitschko, Vitali, rather than Wladimir. The fight did not materialise and Klitschko was set to take on mandatory challenger Alexander Povetkin. On 17 May 2010, the 30-day period of negotiation began for Klitschko to defend his championship against Povetkin. Within this period, discussions to make a fight with Haye were still ongoing.

The bout between Klitschko and Povetkin was initially tentatively scheduled to take place in Frankfurt, Germany, on 11 September 2010. In July 2010, it was confirmed that the bout would be taking place in Frankfurt, with Samuel Peter replacing Povetkin for the scheduled fight as Povetkin failed to show up to the press-conference, deciding to pull out of the fight at the advice of his coach Teddy Atlas who believed Povetkin was not ready to face Klitschko. Klitschko faced Peter for the second time, as they had fought in 2005 previously. Peter weighed in at 241 pounds, two pounds lighter than their first fight. Klitschko came in at a career heavy of 247 pounds.

Peter started the fight very aggressively and caught Klitschko with a good left hook in the opening minute, although Klitschko ended the round well. Peter was caught with three hard right-hands in the second round, one of which seemed to stun him. Peter tried to duck under the Klitschko jab, but was being tied up on the inside. After four rounds, the fight became one-sided in Klitschko's favour. Peter's right eye was closing and he was taking heavy punishment. After the ninth round, Peter's trainer Abel Sanchez said he would give him one more round. Emmanuel Steward also implored Klitschko to be more aggressive. Peter swung wildly in the tenth and Klitschko put him down with a concussive combination. Referee Robert Byrd did not start a count and waved the fight off, awarding Klitschko the win by KO. Klitschko reportedly earned approximately €7.2 million ($9.1 million) for the fight.

Klitschko was set to fight Derek Chisora on 11 December, but the fight was later called off on 8 December due to Klitschko tearing a muscle in his abdomen.

=== Klitschko vs. Haye ===
On 5 January 2011, it was announced that Derek Chisora would get his fight with Klitschko. This enraged David Haye's trainer Adam Booth, who described the move as a "disgrace" on a heated live phone-in with Sky Sports News. Booth alleged Haye had met every single one of Klitschko's demands. The fight against Chisora was rescheduled for 30 April 2011 and was going to take place in SAP Arena, Mannheim. However, on 4 March, it was announced that Klitschko had pulled out of the fight due to not being fully recovered from a torn abdominal muscle. On 5 March, it was instead announced that the highly anticipated fight against Haye would take place on 2 July 2011. The fight was contingent on Klitschko's recovery from a torn abdominal muscle. The contract was written so that if Klitschko was not fully healed, then Haye would fight his brother, Vitali.

Klitschko fought Haye in a heavyweight unification fight for the WBA (Super), IBF, WBO, IBO, and Ring magazine heavyweight titles. The fight took place at the Imtech Arena in Hamburg, Germany on 2 July 2011. Klitschko and Haye agreed to a 50–50 split of the purse and Haye was allotted 7,000 seats at the venue. Klitschko won by UD, the three judges scored it 117–109, 118–108, and 116–110 all in favour of Klitschko. According to CompuBox, Klitschko landed 134 punches of 509 thrown (26.3% accuracy), while Haye connected on 72 shots out of 290 (24.8%). Klitschko outlanded Haye in every round but fourth. Haye revealed afterwards that he had a broken toe on his right foot, and claimed that it had hindered his game plan for the fight as he felt he was unable to jump out at Klitschko like he had previously in his career. Haye was subject to much derision and ridicule from within the boxing community and fans after citing his toe as part of the reason why he lost. Despite this Klitschko claims that Haye was unable to fight because he was just too good for him. According to SecondsOut, both Klitschko and Haye reportedly earned $32 million each for the fight.

After winning the WBA title, all of the major heavyweight titles were in the hands of the Klitschko family. Wladimir and Vitali became the first and only pair of brothers to hold all of the heavyweight titles simultaneously.

=== Klitschko vs. Mormeck, Thompson II, Wach ===
On 6 October 2011, Klitschko announced his next fight. It was originally to be on 10 December 2011 against the former two time unified cruiserweight world champion, Jean-Marc Mormeck (36–4, 22 KOs). The fight would have taken place at Esprit Arena, Düsseldorf. This was Wladimir's first title defence after his win over David Haye unified all major heavyweight belts in the hands of the Klitschko brothers. The fight was predicted to generate 500 million viewers worldwide, similarly to Wladimir's fight against Haye. On 5 December 2011, the fight was cancelled because Klitschko checked into a hospital to have a kidney stone removed. After the removal operation he suffered from fever and inflammation. The fight was rescheduled for 3 March 2012, with Klitschko dominating and knocking out Mormeck in the fourth round. CompuBox showed that in the 10 minutes and 12 seconds the fight lasted, Klitschko landed 39 of 135 punches thrown (29%) and Mormeck landed just 3 of 19 thrown (16%). Mormeck failed to land anything in rounds 1 and 4.

On 4 March 2012, Klitschko stated that he would next fight his mandatory challenger Tony Thompson (36–2, 24 KOs), who had been ranked as the world's eighth best heavyweight by BoxRec at the conclusion of the previous year, in a rematch from their first fight in 2008. At the time, he stated that the newly opened Barclays Arena in New York were interested in showcasing a Klitschko brother. Since they last fought, Thompson recorded five straight wins, all by KO. A purse bid was set by the IBF, where Klitschko, upon request, would receive 85% of the purse split, compared to the usual 75%. The fight was confirmed to take place at the Stade de Suisse in Berne, Switzerland on 7 July. In an interview, Klitschko admitted that Thompson was not his first choice and that he would have rather fought someone he had not fought before. "So far I've always been better in rematches. However, I must not take this lightly as Thompson knows me better than any other fighter", Klitschko said in the build-up to the fight. "I've been waiting for this rematch for so long", Thompson said during one of pre-fight press-conferences, "In Bern, I'm gonna finish what I've started 4 years ago - knock Klitschko out and take the belts back to the United States". Thompson weighed in at 244.75, dropping 10.75 lbs from his last fight, while Klitschko weighed in at 249, the heaviest in his entire career. The additional weight appeared to be muscle.

In the first round, both fighters were cautious, patiently studying each other. Klitschko became more dominant in the second, working mostly with his jab. Thompson unsuccessfully went for the attack and in the process fell to the canvas. The referee did not rule it a knockdown. In the third round, Thompson hurt Klitschko for the first time in the fight with a counter left hand but was still being outboxed by Klitschko. In the fifth round, Klitschko pressed Thompson into a corner and hurt him with a straight right hand, knocking him down. Thompson beat the count but looked hurt, however he was able to survive that round. Klitschko continued his assault in the sixth, sending Thompson down again with a flurry of shots. Thompson got up but had to hold on to the ropes to stand, which prompted the referee to stop the fight, declaring Klitschko the winner by sixth-round TKO. "From the beginning, I had no doubt that I would successfully defend the titles. But it was hard to time an accurate shot. Thompson was elusive, he didn't lose an eye contact at any moment in the fight and was able to see most of my punches", said Klitschko in a post-fight interview. It was his twelfth consecutive title defence, the third-most in heavyweight history. CompuBox stats showed Klitschko landed 51 of 121 total punches thrown (42%) and Thompson landed only 25 of 183 thrown (14%).

Shortly afterwards, Klitschko signed a new 5–fight deal with RTL. According to the agreement, for each fight Klitschko was guaranteed €3 million for broadcasting rights and €117,000 for each of the 23 ads shown by the network throughout the fight, or approximately €2.7 million total.

There was first mention of a potential Klitschko vs. Mariusz Wach (27–0, 15 KOs) fight in August 2011 when Klitschko's team approached Wach's promoters for a fight, however nothing materialised. Wach's promoter Global Boxing stated that it was Klitschko's advisor Shelly Finkel that contacted them. Bernd Boente denied these claims. In August 2012, serious negotiations took place for the fight. A date in November was considered with the venue likely to be in Hamburg, Germany. Terms were fully agreed within days of the negotiations for the fight to take place 10 November. Klitschko revealed he would train with Johnathon Banks due to Steward recovering from a bowel operation. On 25 October, Steward died at the age of 68. The fight was the first time in his 16-year professional career that he had faced an opponent taller than himself. At 2.02 metres tall, with a reach of 2.08 metres and weighing 251 pounds, Wach was four centimetres taller than Klitschko with a reach two centimetres longer. In Poland, the fight was available via pay-per-view platform on Canal+ Sport for 39 zł and Polsat Sport for 40 zł.

On fight night, at the 02 World Arena, Klitschko dominated and retained his titles with a one-sided UD. The three judges' scored the fight 120–107, 120–107, and 119–109. The bout opened with a battle between jabs which was won by Klitschko, who was following his jabs with his signature straight right. Wach managed to wobble Klitschko in round five but failed to take advantage. Wach also showed a great chin later in the fight when Klitschko began to let his hands go more landing thunderous shots. During the course of twelve rounds, Klitschko landed 274 of 693 punches landed (40%), whilst Wach landed 60 of his 308 thrown (19%). After the fight, there were allegations against Wach that he had used steroids. Alongside €5.7 million guaranteed by RTL, Klitschko also earned €1 million from sponsors, €800,000 from ticket sales and €500,000 for ads in the ring, totalling at least €8 million ($10.17 million).

Days before the Klitschko vs. Wach fight took place, it was revealed that Team Sauerland offered Klitschko €5 million (around $6,5 million) for a possible fight against then-WBO cruiserweight champion Marco Huck in the future. At the time, Huck was preparing for a title defence against Firat Arslan. Klitschko's manager Bernd Boente turned down the offer stating money was not the issue. The reason the fight would never get made was due to the fact that the Klitschko's had a contract with German television network RTL and Huck was signed with their rival network ARD.

=== Klitschko vs. Pianeta, Povetkin, Leapai ===
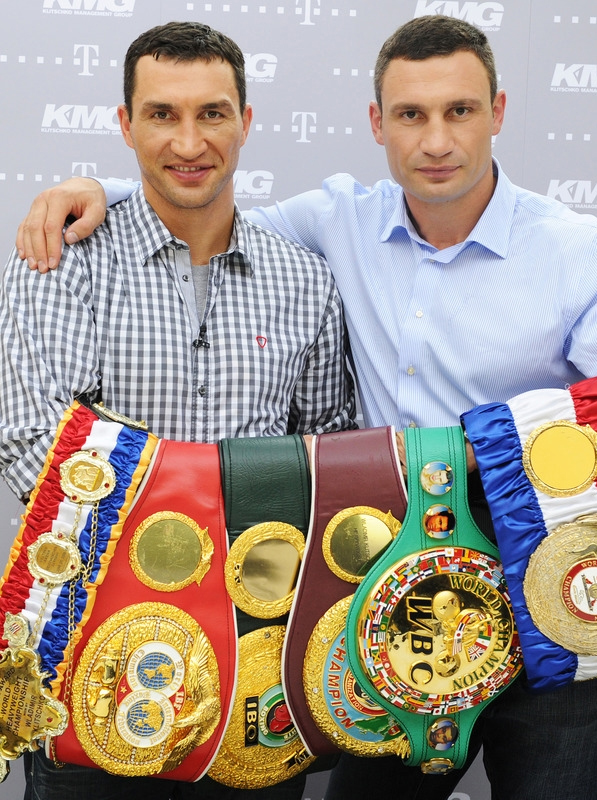
Wladimir and Vitali with every title in the heavyweight division, 2012. Left to right: The Ring, IBF, IBO, WBO, WBC, and WBA.

At the end of 2012, the WBA ordered Klitschko to fight WBA (Regular) champion Alexander Povetkin of Russia by 24 February 2013, but the two sides couldn't reach an agreement. The WBA let Klitschko have another voluntary title defence before taking on Povetkin, but there should have been a signed contract with Povetkin before 28 February, with a new deadline for their bout no later than 31 July.

On 5 March 2013, K2 Promotions announced that Klitschko would fight another undefeated contender, Italian Francesco Pianeta, on 4 May at SAP Arena in Mannheim, Germany. Klitschko had received criticism in regards to past opponents. Pianeta was no different. Speaking to ESPN, he said, "I'm getting always criticised with my opponents, it doesn't matter are they well known or not so much and it's always very difficult to fight against someone that is not known because you are always getting these critics." Pianeta said it was the biggest experience of his life, but not his biggest fight. He went on to say he won his biggest fight against cancer in 2009. From the start, Klitschko systematically broke down the Italian, consistently landing flush straight right hand shots. He dropped Pianeta with a right hand in round four, a left hand put Pianeta down in the fifth; the fight ended at 2:52 in round six when Klitschko put Pianeta down for the third time. According to CompuBox Stats, Klitschko landed 116 of 277 punches thrown (42%) and Pianeta landed 24 of 104 thrown (23%), an average of 4 punches landed per round.

Promoter Vladimir Hryunov won the right to promote Klitschko vs. Povetkin with a purse bid of $23,333,330 and Russian businessman Andrey Ryabinsky putting up the money. Failed bids made were from K2 Promotions ($7,130,000) and Povetkin's promoter Sauerland Event's ($6,014,444). It allowed Ryabinsky to dictate the location of the fight and guaranteed the fighters the biggest purses of their careers. Based on being entitled to 75 per cent of the winning bid, Klitschko got $17,499,997, while Povetkin received $5,833,333. The Klitschko camp were said to be surprised by the bid. The fight was expected to generate around 100 million viewers in Europe. It was reported that the president of Russia, Vladimir Putin, was going to attend the fight.

The fight took place on 5 October 2013 at the Olympic Stadium in Moscow. The bout was marred with over 160 clinches, most initiated by Klitschko, followed by several repeated roughhouse tactics throughout the match. This included Klitschko's leaning on his opponent and pushing his head down and throwing Povetkin away to prevent Povetkin from clinching, which resulted in the referee scoring some of Povetkin's fallings as knockdowns, as well as Povetkin's punching after the referee's break command and leaning his head too low. Klitschko won by UD, scoring a knockdown in round two from a quick left hook, and three knockdowns in round seven, including one prompted from a straight right hand. All three judges scored it 119–104 on the scorecards. Klitschko landed 139 of 417 punches (33%) and Povetkin connected on 59 of 283 (21%). After the fight, Klitschko told in the interview that he had little desire to go for the knockout as the Russian crowd would be disappointed, which lead to speculations about the alleged agreement between the champion and organisers to let the bout go the distance, which Klitschko later denied. With 9.2 rating, the fight became the most popular sporting event on Russian television in 2013, as well as the most watched TV program of the year in Moscow with a 13.9 rating, surpassing the Moscow Victory Day Parade. Overall, the fight was watched by 23 million people in Russia. It was also the most-watched television broadcast of 2013 in Ukraine in the 18+ demographic with a 19.5 rating (55.7 share), overall averaging 11 million viewers and drawing 23 million total viewers on Inter. It was also the most-watched television program on RTL Television in 2013, drawing 11.02 million average viewers.

In November 2013, Alex Leapai (30–4–3, 24 KOs) caused a huge upset in defeating then-unbeaten Denis Boytsov to become the WBO mandatory challenger. On 5 January 2014 K2 Promotions announced that a deal was close to being reached for the Klitschko vs. Leapai fight to take place in Germany on 26 April. Klitschko signed the contract on 3 February. It was revealed that former world title challenger David Tua declined a 'lucrative offer' to spar with Klitschko ahead of the fight. Tua told Australian newspaper The Courier-Mail he "didn't want to help anyone beat a 'Samoan brother'". On fight night, Klitschko knocked Leapai down three times, and referee Eddie Cotton stopped the fight with 55 seconds remaining in the fifth round. Despite all the pre-fight trash talk done by Leapai, Klitschko told him, "You have truly a lionheart. You never stopped. You were challenging, you were bold. You had great desire to become a champion. Not many of my opponents have that type of attitude, that type of heart." Klitschko landed 147 of 396 punches thrown (37%), while Leapai landed a dire 10 of his 69 (14%). The 10 punches landed were made up of 6 jabs and 4 power punches.

=== Klitschko vs. Pulev, Jennings ===
The IBF finally ordered Klitschko vs. Kubrat Pulev on 8 May 2014 and gave a 30-day negotiation period. Klitschko's manager Bernd Boente stated that a potential fight with WBC champion Bermane Stiverne was their main priority, a fight which would see all of the heavyweight belts at stake. Kalle Sauerland stated that he would request to get Klitschko (62–3, 52 KOs) stripped of the IBF title if he didn't fight Pulev. At the same time Deontay Wilder was named as Stiverne's mandatory and the WBC stated he must fight Wilder next. With the IBF purse bid split being 75–25 in favour of the champion, Klitschko requested the split be 80–20 in his favour. The IBF accepted the request. A purse bid took place on 17 June, which was won by K2 Promotions. The winning bid was $7.25 million. Sauerland Event put in a bid for $5.29 million. As per the bid, K2 had the location set as the O2 World Arena in Hamburg, with a possible date being 6 September 2014. In August, Klitschko suffered a bicep injury, thus postponing the fight by at least two months. A new date of 15 November was set. HBO announced that they would air the fight live in the afternoon, making it the 19th Klitschko fight they would show. Two days before the fight, it was revealed only the IBF title would be at stake for Pulev, however if Klitschko loses, the remaining titles would be vacated. The fight's worldwide audience was estimated to be 300 million viewers.

Despite making a spirited effort, Pulev suffered three knockdowns en route to being knocked out in round five by a devastating left hook. The time of stoppage was recorded as 2:11 of round five. In the post-fight interview, Pulev said, "Wladimir is a really good opponent, but he was lucky. I want a rematch". Klitschko praised Pulev, calling him a tough competitor. CompuBox stats showed that Klitschko landed 38 of 89 punches thrown (43%), this included 47% of his power punches. Pulev managed to land only 25 of his 110 thrown (23%). This was made up of 10 jabs and 15 power shots landed. The fight drew 9.16 million viewers in Germany and 1.8 million viewers in Bulgaria, becoming the most watched sports event on Bulgarian TV since 2007 and the most watched programme in the history of the television channel Nova TV. The fight also averaged 620,000 viewers on HBO and peaked at 700,000 viewers.

On 20 January 2015 ESPN reported that the potential Klitschko vs. Jennings was confirmed and to take place on 25 April 2015 at Madison Square Garden. Negotiations initially started in November 2014. Klitschko's manager, Bernd Boente finally announced the fight and said all contracts had been signed. The Barclays Center in New York City was originally chosen to stage the fight, but no reason was given for the change of venue.

It would be the fourth time Klitschko would fight at the Garden, his first time at the arena and the United States since 2008, defending his WBA (Super), IBF, WBO, IBO and The Ring heavyweight titles. He defeated Jennings by effective use of his jab and nullifying Jennings' offensive game on the inside, especially by holding Jennings, which resulted in the referee deducting a point in the tenth round for excessive holding, although Klitschko did end up winning via UD with scores of 116–111, 116–111, and 118–109. According to Compubox Stats, Klitschko landed 144 of his 545 punches thrown (26%) whilst Jennings landed 110 of 376 (29 per cent). According to Nielsen Media Research, the fight averaged 1.637 million viewers on HBO, peaking at 1.742 million viewers. With this win, Klitschko defeated 23rd boxer for the world heavyweight championship, beating a record held by Joe Louis for 66 years. Klitschko reportedly earned $12.5 million for the fight.

=== Klitschko vs. Fury ===
Klitschko was scheduled to take on undefeated heavyweight contender Tyson Fury, the WBO mandatory challenger, on 24 October 2015. On 25 September 2015, Klitschko postponed the fight, citing a calf injury. It was rescheduled for 28 November 2015. On the night of the fight, there was much controversy, first starting with the gloves, then there was a complaint about the ring canvas. Klitschko reportedly had his hands wrapped without a representative of Fury present, so had to do them again. Klitschko lost the fight by UD, with scores of 115–112, 115–112, and 116–111 all in favour of Fury. It was the first defeat Klitschko had suffered in over ten years and marked the end of the 'Klitschko Era', referring to the time period where both Klitschko brothers dominated the division. Klitschko and Fury showed little offence during the twelve rounds, but Fury did enough to take the decision. Klitschko landed 52 of 231 punches thrown (22.5%) and Fury landed 86 of 371 thrown (23.2%).

In the post-fight interview, an emotional Fury said, "This is a dream come true. We worked so hard for this. I've done it. It's hard to come to foreign countries and get decisions. It just means so much to me to come here and get the decision." He then took the microphone to thank Klitschko, "I'd like to say to Wladimir, you're a great champion. And thanks very much for having me. It was all fun and games during the buildup." Klitschko failed to throw his well-known right hand, mostly due to Fury's constant movement and mocking. He said, "Tyson was the faster and better man tonight. I felt quite comfortable in the first six rounds, but I was astonished that Tyson was so fast in the second half as well. I couldn't throw my right hand because the advantage was the longer distance he had." Klitschko had a rematch clause in place.

Klitschko was entitled to a rematch with Fury as part of the contract for their first fight. The rematch was eventually announced on 8 April 2016 and set to take place in Fury's home town at the Manchester Arena in Manchester, England on 9 July 2016. However, Tyson Fury announced via a YouTube video that the fight would be postponed due to an ankle sprain he had received during training. He apologised to his fans and confirmed the fight would be rescheduled for a later date. On 7 July, Fury announced via his Twitter account that the rescheduled fight would take place on 29 October at the Manchester Arena. On 23 September, Fury again postponed the fight after being declared "medically unfit", before eventually vacating the WBA (Super), WBO, and IBO titles, citing problems with depression after testing positive for cocaine. The rematch with Klitschko was cancelled as a result.

=== Klitschko vs. Joshua ===
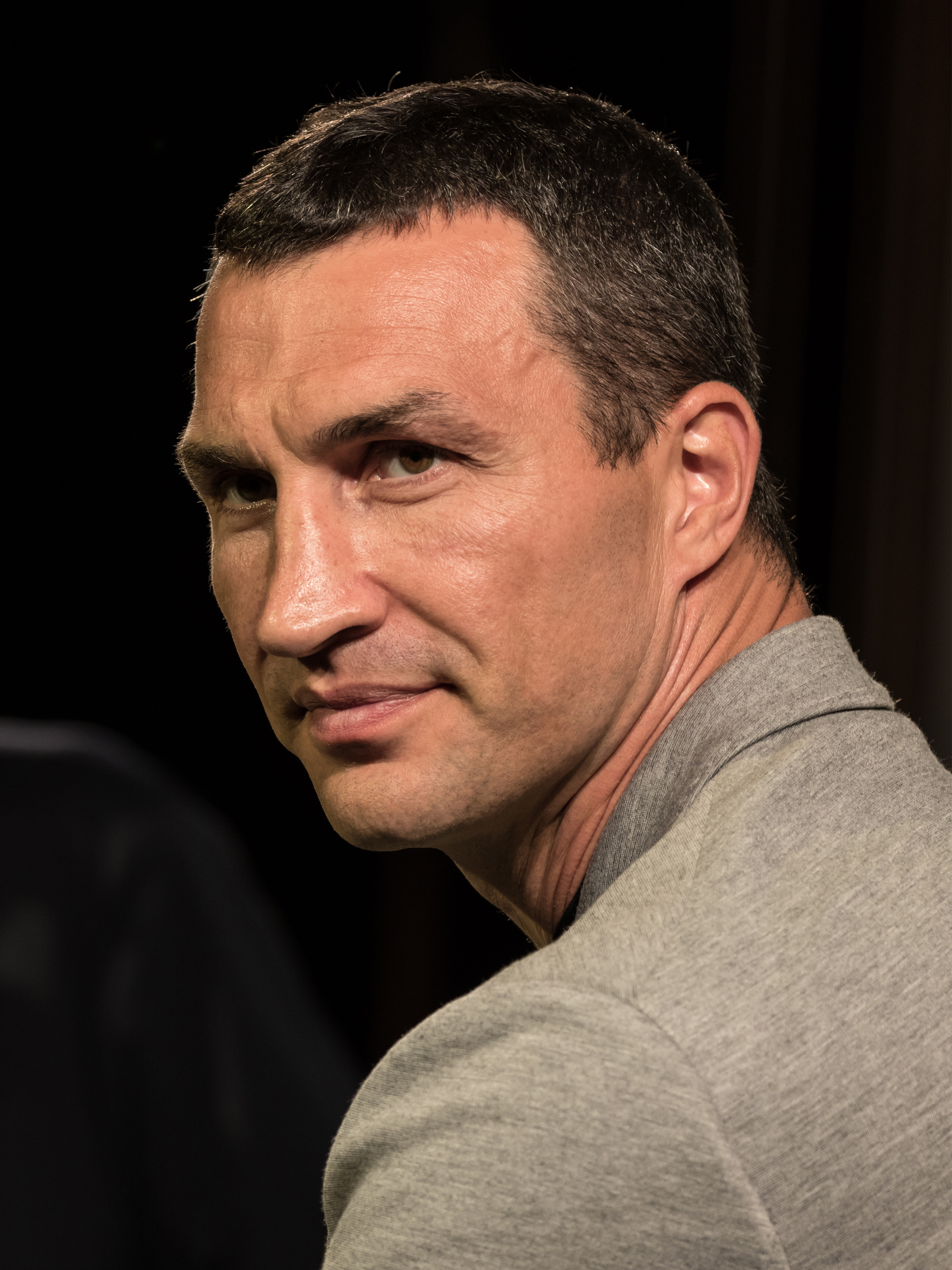
Klitschko in 2017

Days after the Fury rematch was called off, Klitschko was approached by Eddie Hearn, promoter of IBF champion Anthony Joshua, to fight on 28 November date they had set for a second defence. Terms seemed to have been agreed for a £30m fight showdown although an initial contract was yet to be signed. After Fury gave up his world titles, it was said that Klitschko wanted the WBA (Super) title up for grabs in the potential match up against Joshua and waiting for approval, which the WBA kept postponing. A reason as to why the WBA was delaying sanctioning the fight was due them having a legal settlement with Lucas Browne so he could fight for the vacant title next. Klitschko then turned his attention to fighting Browne instead on 10 December, a date his team had an arena set for in Germany. On 24 October, Klitschko suffered a minor calf injury which would rule him out until 2017. Talks between the Klitschko camp and Hearn remained active with a fight set for the first part of 2017. On 2 November, the WBA finally agreed to sanction a fight for their super title as long as Joshua defeats Eric Molina in December 2016.

On 10 December, immediately after Joshua had defeated Molina at the Manchester Arena, Klitschko was invited into the ring by Hearn. It was announced that Klitschko and Joshua would face each other for the WBA (Super), IBF and vacant IBO titles at Wembley Stadium, London, on 29 April 2017. WBA president Gilberto Jesus Mendoza confirmed that the winner will have to face mandatory challenger Luis Ortiz next, with deadlines due to be set after the unification fight. A day later the IBF announced the winner must fight their mandatory challenger Kubrat Pulev. Because of this clashing with the WBA enforcing their mandatory, it was believed that either Joshua or Klitschko would have to vacate a title. In January 2017, Eddie Hearn announced that over 80,000 tickets had been sold, a new box office record, overtaking Carl Froch vs. George Groves II. He put a request in for 5,000 more tickets to be made available. At the weigh in, Klitschko weighed in at 240 and a quarter pounds, the lightest he has weighed since 2009. Joshua came in heavier at 250 pounds.

In front of a post-war record crowd of 90,000 in attendance, Joshua won by TKO in a high-drama contest that saw both men giving their all. They fought a close and cautious first four rounds. In the fifth, Joshua came out and threw a barrage of punches, forcing Klitschko to the canvas. An angry Klitschko rose up and dominated Joshua for the remainder of the round, before landing a clean right hand and scoring his own knockdown in round six. The next few rounds were again cautious, both men wary of each other, until a reinvigorated Joshua attacked Klitschko in round eleven with an upper-cut blow to the right side of Klitschko's face which would be the beginning of the end for the Ukrainian. Joshua then put together a few small but powerful combinations which sent his opponent to the canvas. Klitschko again rose but Joshua knocked him down for a second time in the round by unleashing a seven-punch combination, flooring Klitschko with a left hook. Moments later Joshua tried to end the fight by swinging a few right hooks and managed to back Klitschko into the ropes where he again sent a barrage of punches with no reply. The referee then concluded that Klitschko had taken enough punishment and stopped the fight.

At the time of stoppage, Joshua was ahead on two judges' scorecards at 96–93 and 95–93, while the third judge had Klitschko ahead 95–93. CompuBox stats showed that Joshua landed 107 of his 355 punches thrown (30.1%), and Klitschko landed 94 of 256 (36.7%). In the post-fight interviews, Klitschko spoke about the rematch clause, but gave no indication as to whether he would activate it, "Of course we have a rematch in the contract. I need to analyze and see what the heck happened. I wish I could have raised my hands, but congrats to him. He got up, he fought back, and he won the titles." In the press conference after the fight, Joshua said he would have no issues with having another fight with Klitschko, "I don't mind fighting him again, if he wants the rematch. Big respect to Wladimir for challenging the young lions of the division. It's up to him, I don't mind. As long as Rob thinks it's good I'm good to go." Eddie Hearn said Joshua's next fight would likely take place at the end of the year, possibly at the Principality Stadium in Cardiff.

The fight averaged 659,000 viewers on Showtime in the United States. It was shown live and the fight began around 5 pm. ET and 2 pm. PT. Nielsen Media Research revealed the fight peaked at 687,000 viewers which was during rounds five and six. The delayed tape-replay on HBO was watched by an average 738,000 viewers and peaked at 890,000. In a press release, German TV channel RTL announced the fight was watched by an average 9.59 million viewers, peaking at 10.43 million viewers. This was higher than the 8.91 million that tuned in to watch Klitschko vs. Fury in 2015. The fight did lower numbers than Klitschko's win over Mariusz Wach in 2012, which was watched by 11 million and Klitschko vs. Haye, which was seen by over 16 million.

On 7 June 2017, the IBF granted Joshua an exception for him to rematch Klitschko instead of fighting mandatory challenger Kubrat Pulev. At this point, it was not said that the rematch would take place. Klitschko said he needed time to review his situation before agreeing to a rematch. It was only weeks after the fight, when Eddie Hearn filed the paperwork to the IBF to request the exception to the mandatory defence. The IBF explained that the rematch must take place no later than 2 December 2017 and the winner must fight Pulev next with no exceptions.

On 11 July 2017, Eddie Hearn travelled to the US to apply for a Nevada boxing licence for promoting and to also scout potential locations in Las Vegas speaking to MGM. He had a tour of the T-Mobile Arena. Although Nigeria, Dubai and China were discussed, Hearn warmed up to the idea of the fight taking place in Las Vegas. Hearn told Sky Sports, "We met with Richard Sturm and the team at MGM in Las Vegas yesterday and had a full tour of the T-Mobile Arena which is very impressive. There is a huge appetite from both sides to hold the rematch there and we will be talking further over the next week or so to see if that can become a reality." Showtime's Stephen Espinoza said a deal could be reached quickly, as he was also eager to get Joshua, who was in contract with Showtime, to fight in US, "It's no secret we've been salivating about getting him over here and certainly that would be a phenomenal fight. It would be the biggest heavyweight Vegas fight in probably a couple of decades, so we would love to host it." On 25 July, Hearn pencilled on 11 November 2017 for the rematch to take place at the T-Mobile Arena. It was reported the fight could be pay-per-view in the US.

=== Retirement ===
On 3 August 2017, Klitschko announced on his official website and social media channels that he was retiring from boxing. He ended his professional career with 64 wins in 69 fights, 53 by knockout. He competed in 29 world title fights.

== Legacy ==
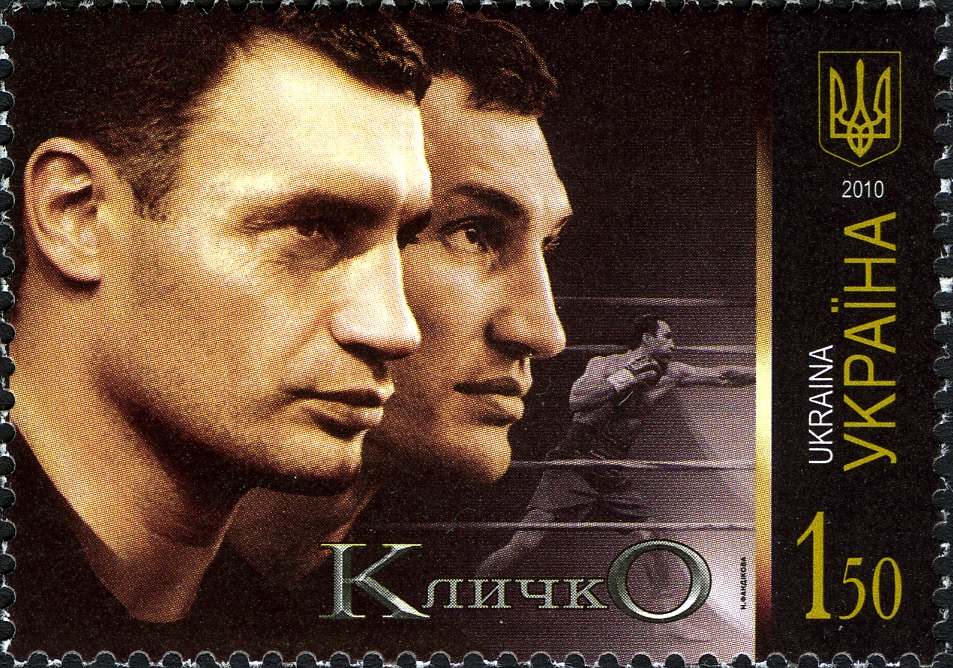
The Klitschko brothers on a 2010 Ukrainian stamp

During Klitschko's reign as world heavyweight champion, his fights would reportedly draw up to 500 million viewers worldwide. Klitschko has been named multiple times among the 100 highest paid athletes in the world by Forbes: he was ranked 24th in 2012 (Forbes' inaugural list; estimated income $28 million between 1 June 2011 and 1 June 2012), 41st in 2013 ($24 million), 25th in 2014 ($28 million), 63rd in 2015 ($21.5 million) and 98th in 2017. During his active career Klitschko was only omitted from the Forbes' list once, in 2016, despite the fact that he reportedly earned $22.5 million for the fight against Tyson Fury in November 2015 (100th-ranked Buster Posey earned $20.8 million; 85th-ranked Conor McGregor earned $22 million). Wladimir Klitschko's total professional career earnings are estimated to be around €150 million. Known for charity work and philanthropy, Wladimir is one of only 15 current or former living athletes that have been named UNESCO Champions for Sport.

Considered national heroes in Ukraine, in 2008 the Klitschko brothers were voted the 15th greatest Ukrainians of all time following a nation-wide poll that saw around 2.5 million people casting their votes. Boxing fights involving one of the Klitschko brothers regularly attracted between 10 and 20 million viewers in Ukraine; Wladimir's fight against Alexander Povetkin generated even bigger viewership numbers, attracting 23 million viewers. Wladimir has been named multiple times among the 100 most influential people in Ukraine by Korrespondent: he was ranked 95th in 2006, 88th in 2010, 43rd in 2011, 51st in 2012 and 45th in 2013. Forbes named Klitschko the most popular celebrity in Ukraine in 2015, placing him ahead of a singer Svyatoslav Vakarchuk and Kvartal 95 Studio, and ranked him second and third in 2012 and 2013 respectively (the ranking wasn't conducted in 2014). In 2017, Wladimir was honoured with the Order of Liberty, the highest Ukrainian honour that can be awarded to a person of any nationality, for his achievements in sports and contribution to the economical, scientific and cultural development of Ukraine.

The Klitschkos were also considered big stars in Germany. A survey carried out by TNS for the Horizont Sport Business in 2003 showed that 91.7% of Germans recognized Wladimir Klitschko while 70.5% celebrated his successes, making him the fourth most recognized and third most beloved athlete in Germany at the time. According to DW, another research conducted no later than 2011 showed that nearly 99% of people in Germany recognized the Klitschko brothers. The CPI Index conducted by the agency Celebrity Performance in 2012 had the Klitschkos ranked second on the list of the most marketable celebrities in Germany, while in January 2014, based on a survey of 1151 respondents that was conducted by the same agency, the Klitschko brothers were ranked 6th in the "2013 Person of the Year" category. At least four of his fights finished among the top 10 most-watched television broadcasts of the year; the fight against David Haye was the most watched broadcast of 2011 in the 14–49 demographic. Ten of his fights generated over 10 million average viewers, and his world heavyweight title defence against Eddie Chambers in March 2010 drew bigger viewership numbers on RTL than the return from retirement of the Formula One legend, voted the greatest German athlete of the 20th century, Michael Schumacher the same month.

Credited for selling out sports stadiums, Klitschko had eight of his fights take place at sports stadiums in Germany, Switzerland and United Kingdom, with all but one having attendances ranging from 43,000 to 90,000.

During his career, Wladimir defeated 23 boxers for the world heavyweight championship, the most in boxing history. Klitschko holds several historical records, including holding the world heavyweight championship longer than any other boxer in history at 4,382 days (12 years); the most beaten opponents and wins in world heavyweight title bouts since the international expansion of boxing governing bodies, at 23 and 25 respectively; the most wins in unified title bouts and the longest unified championship reign in professional boxing history at 15 title bouts and 14 consecutive defences respectively. He has the second most total successful title defences of any heavyweight boxer with 23 (including his first reign as WBO champion), behind Joe Louis (25) and ahead of Larry Holmes (20) and Muhammad Ali (19) and the third most consecutive title defenses in heavyweight history. Klitschko fought in 29 world heavyweight title fights, more than any other boxer in history.

As of April 2025, BoxRec ranks Wladimir Klitschko as the 69th greatest boxer of all time, pound for pound. According to BoxRec, Klitschko has also defeated 12 previously undefeated fighters with a combined record 267–0–5 (174 KOs) – these 12 included Najee Shaheed (professional record 16–0–1, 8 KOs coming into the fight), Zoran Vujicic (14–0, 6 KOs), Eliseo Castillo (18–0–1, 14 KOs), Samuel Peter (24–0, 21 KOs), Calvin Brock (29–0, 22 KOs), Sultan Ibragimov (22–0–1, 17 KOs), Ruslan Chagaev (25–0–1, 17 KOs), Mariusz Wach (27–0, 15 KOs), Francesco Pianeta (28–0–1, 15 KOs), Alexander Povetkin (26–0, 18 KOs), Kubrat Pulev (20–0, 11 KOs) and Bryant Jennings (19–0, 10 KOs). Wladimir has beaten 9 current or former world champions throughout his career. These included heavyweight champions Chris Byrd (twice), Ray Mercer, Lamon Brewster, Samuel Peter (twice), Sultan Ibragimov, Hasim Rahman and Ruslan Chagaev, two-weight world champion David Haye and unified cruiserweight champion Jean-Marc Mormeck.

Known for his punching power, Klitschko defeated his opponent inside the distance 56 times in 69 fights, an 81% knockout-to-win ratio (this includes two DQs and one TD). Of his thirteen remaining bouts, four involved an opponent that Klitschko knocked out in a rematch (Everett Martin, Chris Byrd, Lamon Brewster, and Samuel Peter), three saw him knock his opponent down multiple times on the way to a wide decision victory (David Haye, Alexander Povetkin, and the first fight against Chris Byrd), two saw Klitschko hurt and knock down his opponent before being knocked out himself (Anthony Joshua and the first fight with Lamon Brewster), and three involved fighters who have never been knocked out by anyone before or after in all of their professional careers (Tyson Fury, Sultan Ibragimov, and Ross Puritty).

Analyzing his legacy, Dan Rafael wrote that Klitschko proved himself to be an all-time great heavyweight, and that his legacy will be viewed more favourably as time passes, comparing him to Lennox Lewis in that regard. Rafael believes that Klitschko's 22-fight winning streak from 2004 to 2015, which included unifying three titles, cemented his legacy among the greatest of all time. Klitschko was criticized for his cautious boxing style, but Rafael argues that a lack of exciting fights is not equal to lack of quality. He also believes that the alleged weakness of the era in which Klitschko competed is overexaggerated, arguing that only two eras in heavyweight boxing, the 1970s and 1990s, could be considered great eras, and that Klitschko's era is no weaker than that of Mike Tyson who made only half as many title defenses as Wladimir did. Despite this, Rafael insists that Wladimir still has a lot of quality opponents on his resume, such as Chris Byrd, David Haye, Alexander Povetkin, Calvin Brock, Sultan Ibragimov and Ruslan Chagaev, and that those wins should not be dismissed due to their one-sided nature; in fact, it only emphasizes the quality of Klitschko's boxing skills and in-ring intelligence. Rafael wrote that even though Klitschko suffered some bad losses, the totality of his career must be considered.

In 2021, Klitschko was inducted into the International Boxing Hall of Fame in his first year of eligibility, having been elected over Miguel Cotto and James Toney by a panel of around 200 international boxing historians.

== Other interests ==
Klitschko is also a passionate golfer and was seen playing in the Alfred Dunhill Links Championship in Scotland. The tournament was played over three courses in 2008 including St Andrews, Carnoustie, and Kingsbarns in Fife and Angus. Klitschko was named curator of the Ukrainian pavilion at the 2009 Venice Biennale.

As of October 2015, Klitschko was an adjunct professor at Switzerland's University of St. Gallen, where he taught master's students.

== Personal life ==
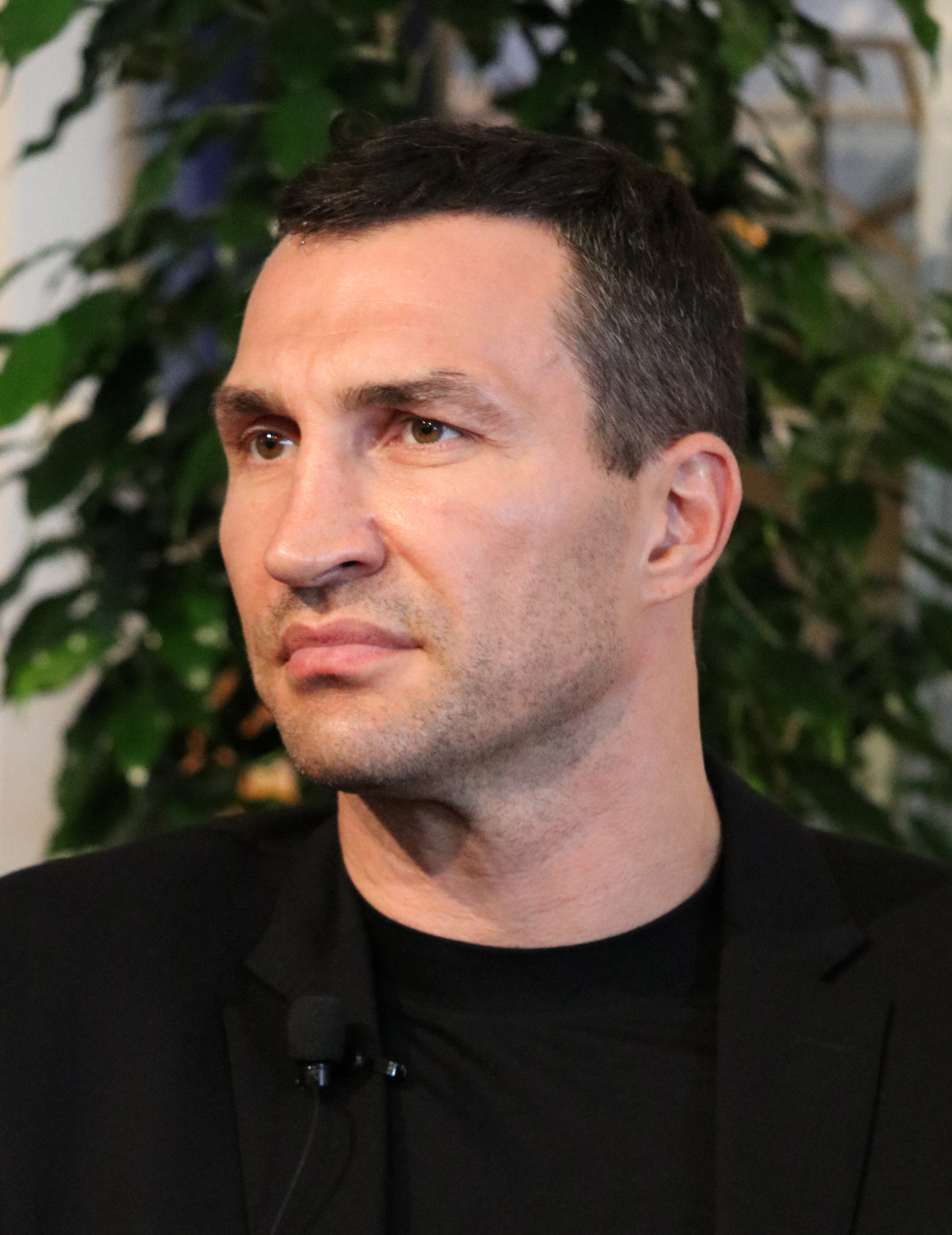
Klitschko in 2018

From 2009, Klitschko was in a relationship with American actress Hayden Panettiere. Panettiere appeared ringside at some of Klitschko's fights, including at Klitschko's 10th-round KO victory over Samuel Peter. The couple had a brief split in 2011, but were together again in 2013. In October 2013, Panettiere confirmed that she and Klitschko were engaged. Their union produced a daughter, born in December 2014, of whom Klitschko was granted full custody in 2018. In August 2018, according to Panettiere's mother, Lesley Vogel, the couple had split for a second time. They were said to be on 'good terms' for the sake of their daughter as recently as May 2026, shortly before Panettiere's death in August 2026.

On 6 December 2013, Klitschko and his then-fiancée Hayden Panettiere visited the Euromaidan-protests in Kyiv. His brother Vitali was one of the leading figures of these protests. He and Panettiere addressed the crowds.

Wladimir and his brother Vitali have never fought each other in a professional fight as their mother made them promise to never fight each other.

Klitschko speaks four languages: Ukrainian, Russian, English and German. He was friends with the late German heavyweight legend Max Schmeling.

Klitschko appeared in the 2001 movie Ocean's 11 in a fictional bout with Lennox Lewis.

On 29 March 2012, during a charitable auction in Kyiv, Ukraine, Klitschko auctioned off his 1996 Olympic gold medal to a buyer who bid $1 million. Klitschko said he would use the money to help the dreams of hundreds of thousands of Ukrainian children. After the sale, the buyer immediately returned the medal out of respect for Klitschko and because he wanted it to remain with the Klitschko family.

In February 2022, Klitschko joined the Kyiv Territorial Defense Brigade (a military reserve component of the Ukrainian Armed Forces). Both he and his brother Vitali Klitschko, who has been Mayor of Kyiv since 2014, pledged to fight to protect the capital of Ukraine, Kyiv, through armed forces, in response to Russia's invasion of Ukraine that began on 24 February 2022. According to The Times, Wladimir and Vitali were on Vladimir Putin's personal hitlist of 24 high-profile Ukrainian figures whom he wanted assassinated.

On 10 March 2022, the brothers announced via Telegram that they had raised €100 million of financial support for Ukraine with a fundraising campaign in Germany.

In November 2024, Klitschko issued a request to American podcast host Joe Rogan to have him on his show in order to discuss their differences regarding the Ukraine-Russia conflict. Klitschko accused Rogan of "repeating Russian propaganda."

== Professional boxing record ==
69 fights	64 wins	5 losses
By knockout	53	4
By decision	9	1
By disqualification	2	0

No.	Result	Record	Opponent	Type	Round, time	Date	Age	Location	Notes
69	Loss	64–5	Anthony Joshua	TKO	11 (12), 2:25	29 Apr 2017	41 years, 35 days	Wembley Stadium, London, England	For IBF, vacant WBA (Super) and IBO heavyweight titles
68	Loss	64–4	Tyson Fury	UD	12	28 Nov 2015	39 years, 248 days	Esprit Arena, Düsseldorf, Germany	Lost WBA (Super), IBF, WBO, IBO, and The Ring heavyweight titles
67	Win	64–3	Bryant Jennings	UD	12	25 Apr 2015	39 years, 32 days	Madison Square Garden, New York City, New York, US	Retained WBA (Super), IBF, WBO, IBO, and The Ring heavyweight titles
66	Win	63–3	Kubrat Pulev	KO	5 (12), 2:11	15 Nov 2014	38 years, 235 days	O2 World, Hamburg, Germany	Retained WBA (Super), IBF, WBO, IBO, and The Ring heavyweight titles
65	Win	62–3	Alex Leapai	TKO	5 (12), 2:05	26 Apr 2014	38 years, 32 days	König Pilsener Arena, Oberhausen, Germany	Retained WBA (Super), IBF, WBO, IBO, and The Ring heavyweight titles
64	Win	61–3	Alexander Povetkin	UD	12	5 Oct 2013	37 years, 194 days	Olympic Stadium, Moscow, Russia	Retained WBA (Super), IBF, WBO, IBO, and The Ring heavyweight titles
63	Win	60–3	Francesco Pianeta	TKO	6 (12), 2:52	4 May 2013	37 years, 40 days	SAP Arena, Mannheim, Germany	Retained WBA (Super), IBF, WBO, IBO, and The Ring heavyweight titles
62	Win	59–3	Mariusz Wach	UD	12	10 Nov 2012	36 years, 230 days	O2 World, Hamburg, Germany	Retained WBA (Super), IBF, WBO, IBO, and The Ring heavyweight titles
61	Win	58–3	Tony Thompson	TKO	6 (12), 1:12	7 Jul 2012	36 years, 104 days	Stade de Suisse, Bern, Switzerland	Retained WBA (Super), IBF, WBO, IBO, and The Ring heavyweight titles
60	Win	57–3	Jean-Marc Mormeck	KO	4 (12), 1:12	3 Mar 2012	35 years, 344 days	Esprit Arena, Düsseldorf, Germany	Retained WBA (Super), IBF, WBO, IBO, and The Ring heavyweight titles
59	Win	56–3	David Haye	UD	12	2 Jul 2011	35 years, 99 days	Volksparkstadion, Hamburg, Germany	Retained IBF, WBO, IBO, and The Ring heavyweight titles; Won WBA (Unified) heavyweight title
58	Win	55–3	Samuel Peter	KO	10 (12), 1:22	11 Sep 2010	34 years, 170 days	Commerzbank-Arena, Frankfurt, Germany	Retained IBF, WBO, IBO, and The Ring heavyweight titles
57	Win	54–3	Eddie Chambers	KO	12 (12), 2:55	20 Mar 2010	33 years, 360 days	Esprit Arena, Düsseldorf, Germany	Retained IBF, WBO, IBO, and The Ring heavyweight titles
56	Win	53–3	Ruslan Chagaev	RTD	9 (12), 3:00	20 Jun 2009	33 years, 87 days	Veltins-Arena, Gelsenkirchen, Germany	Retained IBF, WBO, and IBO heavyweight titles; Won vacant The Ring heavyweight title
55	Win	52–3	Hasim Rahman	TKO	7 (12), 0:44	13 Dec 2008	32 years, 263 days	SAP Arena, Mannheim, Germany	Retained IBF, WBO, and IBO heavyweight titles
54	Win	51–3	Tony Thompson	KO	11 (12), 1:38	12 Jul 2008	32 years, 109 days	Color Line Arena, Hamburg, Germany	Retained IBF, WBO, and IBO heavyweight titles
53	Win	50–3	Sultan Ibragimov	UD	12	23 Feb 2008	31 years, 335 days	Madison Square Garden, New York City, New York, US	Retained IBF and IBO heavyweight titles; Won WBO heavyweight title
52	Win	49–3	Lamon Brewster	RTD	6 (12), 3:00	7 Jul 2007	31 years, 104 days	Kölnarena, Cologne, Germany	Retained IBF and IBO heavyweight titles
51	Win	48–3	Ray Austin	KO	2 (12), 1:23	10 Mar 2007	30 years, 350 days	SAP Arena, Mannheim, Germany	Retained IBF and IBO heavyweight titles
50	Win	47–3	Calvin Brock	TKO	7 (12), 2:10	11 Nov 2006	30 years, 231 days	Madison Square Garden, New York City, New York, US	Retained IBF and IBO heavyweight titles
49	Win	46–3	Chris Byrd	TKO	7 (12), 0:41	22 Apr 2006	30 years, 28 days	SAP Arena, Mannheim, Germany	Won IBF and vacant IBO heavyweight titles
48	Win	45–3	Samuel Peter	UD	12	24 Sep 2005	29 years, 183 days	Boardwalk Hall, Atlantic City, New Jersey, US	Won NABF and vacant NABO heavyweight titles
47	Win	44–3	Eliseo Castillo	TKO	4 (10), 2:51	23 Apr 2005	29 years, 29 days	Westfalenhallen, Dortmund, Germany	
46	Win	43–3	DaVarryl Williamson	TD	5 (10), 3:00	2 Oct 2004	28 years, 191 days	Caesars Palace, Paradise, Nevada, US	Split TD: Klitschko cut from an accidental head clash
45	Loss	42–3	Lamon Brewster	TKO	5 (12), 3:00	10 Apr 2004	28 years, 16 days	Mandalay Bay Events Center, Paradise, Nevada, US	For vacant WBO heavyweight title
44	Win	42–2	Danell Nicholson	TKO	4 (12), 1:44	20 Dec 2003	27 years, 270 days	Ostseehalle, Kiel, Germany	Retained WBA Inter-Continental heavyweight title
43	Win	41–2	Fabio Eduardo Moli	KO	1 (12), 1:49	30 Aug 2003	27 years, 158 days	Olympiahalle, Munich, Germany	Won vacant WBA Inter-Continental heavyweight title
42	Loss	40–2	Corrie Sanders	TKO	2 (12), 0:27	8 Mar 2003	26 years, 348 days	Preussag Arena, Hanover, Germany	Lost WBO heavyweight title
41	Win	40–1	Jameel McCline	RTD	10 (12), 3:00	7 Dec 2002	26 years, 257 days	Mandalay Bay Events Center, Paradise, Nevada, US	Retained WBO heavyweight title
40	Win	39–1	Ray Mercer	TKO	6 (12), 1:08	29 Jun 2002	26 years, 93 days	Etess Arena, Atlantic City, New Jersey, US	Retained WBO heavyweight title
39	Win	38–1	Francois Botha	TKO	8 (12), 0:47	16 Mar 2002	25 years, 356 days	Hanns-Martin-Schleyer-Halle, Stuttgart, Germany	Retained WBO heavyweight title
38	Win	37–1	Charles Shufford	TKO	6 (12), 2:55	4 Aug 2001	25 years, 132 days	Mandalay Bay Events Center, Paradise, Nevada, US	Retained WBO heavyweight title
37	Win	36–1	Derrick Jefferson	TKO	2 (12), 2:09	24 Mar 2001	24 years, 344 days	Rudi-Sedlmayer-Halle, Munich, Germany	Retained WBO heavyweight title
36	Win	35–1	Chris Byrd	UD	12	14 Oct 2000	24 years, 203 days	Kölnarena, Cologne, Germany	Won WBO heavyweight title
35	Win	34–1	Monte Barrett	TKO	7 (10), 2:40	15 Jul 2000	24 years, 112 days	London Arena, London, England	
34	Win	33–1	David Bostice	TKO	2 (12), 1:27	29 Apr 2000	24 years, 35 days	Madison Square Garden, New York City, New York, US	Retained WBA Inter-Continental heavyweight title
33	Win	32–1	Paea Wolfgramm	KO	1 (12), 1:30	18 Mar 2000	23 years, 359 days	Alsterdorfer Sporthalle, Hamburg, Germany	Won vacant WBC International heavyweight title
32	Win	31–1	Lajos Eros	KO	2 (12), 2:35	4 Dec 1999	23 years, 254 days	Stadionsporthalle, Hanover, Germany	Retained WBA Inter-Continental and European heavyweight titles
31	Win	30–1	Phil Jackson	KO	2 (8), 1:59	12 Nov 1999	23 years, 232 days	The Orleans, Paradise, Nevada, US	
30	Win	29–1	Axel Schulz	TKO	8 (12), 2:42	25 Sep 1999	23 years, 184 days	Kölnarena, Cologne, Germany	Retained WBA Inter-Continental heavyweight title; Won vacant European heavyweight title
29	Win	28–1	Joseph Chingangu	RTD	4 (12), 3:00	17 Jul 1999	23 years, 114 days	Philips Halle, Düsseldorf, Germany	Won vacant WBA Inter-Continental heavyweight title
28	Win	27–1	Tony LaRosa	TKO	1 (10), 2:57	22 May 1999	23 years, 58 days	Sport Palace, Budapest, Hungary	
27	Win	26–1	Everett Martin	TKO	8 (8)	24 Apr 1999	23 years, 30 days	Circus Krone Building, Munich, Germany	
26	Win	25–1	Zoran Vujicic	KO	1 (8), 1:02	13 Feb 1999	22 years, 325 days	Maritim Hotel, Stuttgart, Germany	
25	Loss	24–1	Ross Puritty	TKO	11 (12), 0:18	5 Dec 1998	22 years, 255 days	Palace of Sports, Kyiv, Ukraine	Lost WBC International heavyweight title
24	Win	24–0	Donnell Wingfield	KO	1 (8)	14 Nov 1998	22 years, 234 days	Circus Krone Building, Munich, Germany	
23	Win	23–0	Eli Dixon	KO	3 (10), 2:26	3 Oct 1998	22 years, 192 days	Prinz-Garden Halle, Augsburg, Germany	
22	Win	22–0	Steve Pannell	KO	2 (10)	19 Sep 1998	22 years, 178 days	Arena Oberhausen, Oberhausen, Germany	
21	Win	21–0	Carlos Monroe	TKO	6 (10), 2:28	6 Aug 1998	22 years, 134 days	Grand Casino Avoyelles, Marksville, Louisiana, US	
20	Win	20–0	Najee Shaheed	KO	1 (12)	10 Jul 1998	22 years, 107 days	Circus Krone Building, Munich, Germany	Retained WBC International heavyweight title
19	Win	19–0	Cody Koch	KO	4 (12)	23 May 1998	22 years, 59 days	Oberrheinhalle, Offenburg, Germany	Retained WBC International heavyweight title
18	Win	18–0	Everett Martin	UD	8	13 Mar 1998	21 years, 353 days	Sporthalle Wandsbek, Hamburg, Germany	
17	Win	17–0	Marcus McIntyre	KO	3 (12)	14 Feb 1998	21 years, 326 days	Maritim Hotel, Stuttgart, Germany	Won vacant WBC International heavyweight title
16	Win	16–0	Derrick Lampkins	TKO	1 (8)	20 Dec 1997	21 years, 270 days	Oberrheinhalle, Offenburg, Germany	
15	Win	15–0	Ladislav Husarik	TKO	3 (8)	13 Dec 1997	21 years, 263 days	Alsterdorfer Sporthalle, Hamburg, Germany	
14	Win	14–0	Jerry Halstead	TKO	2 (8)	6 Dec 1997	21 years, 256 days	Stadthalle, Offenbach am Main, Germany	
13	Win	13–0	Marcos González	KO	2 (8)	11 Oct 1997	21 years, 200 days	Stadthalle, Cottbus, Germany	
12	Win	12–0	James Pritchard	TKO	3 (8)	20 Sep 1997	21 years, 179 days	Tivoli Eissporthalle, Aachen, Germany	
11	Win	11–0	Biko Botowamungu	DQ	5 (6), 0:02	23 Aug 1997	21 years, 151 days	Maritim Hotel, Stuttgart, Germany	Botowamungu disqualified after his cornermen refused to leave the ring
10	Win	10–0	Gilberto Williamson	TKO	3 (8)	12 Jul 1997	21 years, 109 days	Berlet-Halle, Hagen, Germany	
9	Win	9–0	Salvador Maciel	KO	1 (8)	27 Jun 1997	21 years, 94 days	Oberrheinhalle, Offenburg, Germany	
8	Win	8–0	Paul Ashley	KO	2 (8), 1:25	13 Jun 1997	21 years, 80 days	Arena Oberhausen, Oberhausen, Germany	
7	Win	7–0	Mark Wills	KO	1 (8), 2:58	10 May 1997	21 years, 46 days	Ballsporthalle, Frankfurt, Germany	
6	Win	6–0	Mark Young	RTD	2 (6), 3:00	12 Apr 1997	21 years, 18 days	Eurogress, Aachen, Germany	
5	Win	5–0	Carlos Monroe	DQ	6 (6), 0:34	15 Feb 1997	20 years, 327 days	Stadthalle, Cottbus, Germany	Monroe disqualified for a headbutt
4	Win	4–0	Troy Weida	TKO	3 (6), 0:36	25 Jan 1997	20 years, 306 days	Maritim Hotel, Stuttgart, Germany	
3	Win	3–0	Bill Corrigan	TKO	1 (4), 1:21	21 Dec 1996	20 years, 271 days	Zoological Garden, Frankfurt, Germany	
2	Win	2–0	Exum Speight	TKO	2 (4), 1:54	30 Nov 1996	20 years, 250 days	Arena Nova, Wiener Neustadt, Austria	
1	Win	1–0	Fabian Meza	KO	1 (4), 1:35	16 Nov 1996	20 years, 236 days	Sporthalle Wandsbek, Hamburg, Germany	

== Titles in boxing ==
=== Major world titles ===
- WBA (Unified and Super) heavyweight champion (Note: Primary champion throughout his reign. Promoted to Super champion in August 2011.) (200+ lbs)
- IBF heavyweight champion (200+ lbs)
- WBO heavyweight champion (200+ lbs) (2×)

=== The Ring magazine titles ===
- The Ring heavyweight champion (200+ lbs)

=== Minor world titles ===
- IBO heavyweight champion (200+ lbs)

=== Regional/International titles ===
- WBA Inter-Continental heavyweight champion (200+ lbs) (2×)
- WBC International heavyweight champion (200+ lbs) (2×)
- European heavyweight champion (200+ lbs)
- NABF heavyweight champion (200+ lbs)
- NABO heavyweight champion (200+ lbs)

=== Honorary titles ===
- WBO Super Champion

== Viewership ==
=== International ===
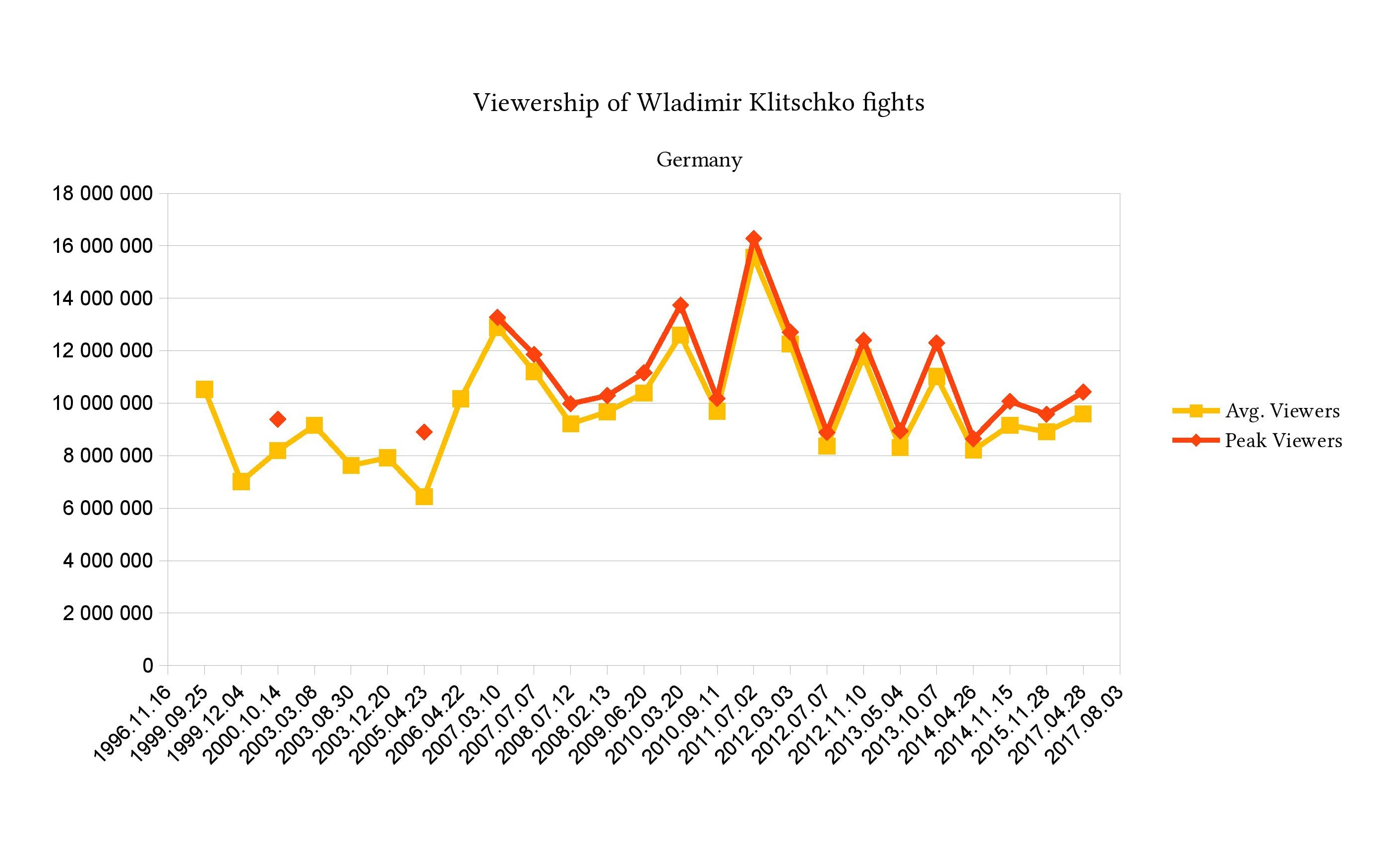
A chart that represents the evolution of German TV viewership numbers of Wladimir Klitschko's fights since 1999

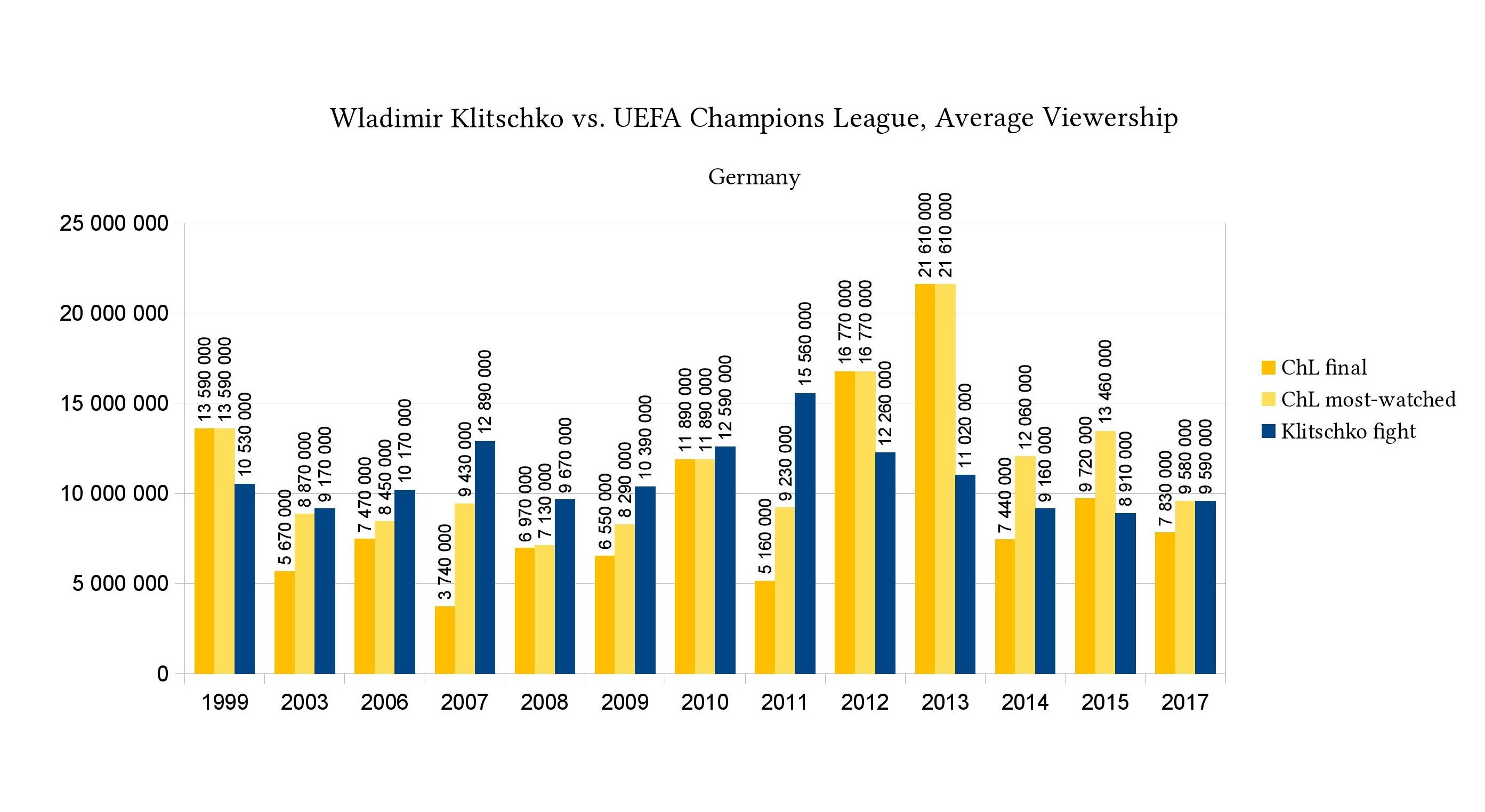
Viewership of Wladimir Klitschko's fights compared with popularity of UEFA Champions League matches in Germany throughout the years

Date	Fight	Billing	Region(s)	Network	Viewership	Source(s)	Note(s)
25 September 1999	Wladimir Klitschko vs. Axel Schulz	Klitschko vs. Schulz	Germany	RTL Television	10,530,000		(Note: Average viewers)
4 December 1999	Wladimir Klitschko vs. Lajos Eros	Klitschko vs. Eros	Germany	Sat.1	7,010,000		
15 July 2000	Wladimir Klitschko vs. Monte Barrett	The Homecoming	United States	HBO	2,067,000		(Note: Average number of households) (Note: Pay television network)
14 October 2000	Chris Byrd vs. Wladimir Klitschko	Revenge of the Brother	Germany	Sat.1	8,190,000		
7 December 2002	Wladimir Klitschko vs. Jameel McCline	Klitschko vs. McCline	Germany	ZDF	4,590,000		(Note: Same day replay)
8 March 2003	Wladimir Klitschko vs. Corrie Sanders	The Next Big Thing	Germany	ZDF	9,170,000		
30 August 2003	Wladimir Klitschko vs. Fabio Eduardo Moli	Night of the Giants	Germany	ZDF	7,630,000		
20 December 2003	Wladimir Klitschko vs. Danell Nicholson	Klitschko vs. Nicholson	Germany	ZDF	7,920,000		
20 December 2003	Wladimir Klitschko vs. Danell Nicholson	Klitschko vs. Nicholson	Russia	N/A	16,500,000		
23 April 2005	Wladimir Klitschko vs. Eliseo Castillo	Klitschko vs. Castillo	Germany	Das Erste	6,440,000		
24 September 2005	Wladimir Klitschko vs. Samuel Peter	Boardwalk Brawls	United States	HBO	2,036,000		
24 April 2006	Chris Byrd vs. Wladimir Klitschko II	Revenge Is The Name of the Game	Germany	Das Erste	10,170,000		
11 November 2006	Wladimir Klitschko vs. Calvin Brock	Klitschko vs. Brock	Germany	RTL Television	2,330,000		
11 November 2006	Wladimir Klitschko vs. Calvin Brock	Klitschko vs. Brock	Germany	RTL Television	4,200,000		
10 March 2007	Wladimir Klitschko vs. Ray Austin	Danger Zone	Germany	RTL Television	12,880,000		
7 July 2007	Wladimir Klitschko vs. Lamon Brewster II	The Rematch	Germany	RTL Television	11,270,000		
23 February 2008	Wladimir Klitschko vs. Sultan Ibragimov	The Unification	Germany	RTL Television	2,260,000		
23 February 2008	Wladimir Klitschko vs. Sultan Ibragimov	The Unification	Germany	RTL Television	3,790,000		
23 February 2008	Wladimir Klitschko vs. Sultan Ibragimov	The Unification	Russia	1 Kanal	9,500,000		(Note: Viewers aged 10+)
23 February 2008	Wladimir Klitschko vs. Sultan Ibragimov	The Unification	United States	HBO	1,800,000		
12 July 2008	Wladimir Klitschko vs. Tony Thompson	Time To Pick On Someone His Own Size	Germany	RTL Television	9,220,000		
12 July 2008	Wladimir Klitschko vs. Tony Thompson	Time To Pick On Someone His Own Size	Ukraine	Inter	7,100,000		(Note: Total viewers)
13 December 2008	Wladimir Klitschko vs. Hasim Rahman	X-Plosive	Germany	RTL Television	9,670,000		
13 December 2008	Wladimir Klitschko vs. Hasim Rahman	X-Plosive	Ukraine	Inter	5,637,000		(Note: Viewers aged 18+)
20 June 2009	Wladimir Klitschko vs. Ruslan Chagaev	Knockout Auf Schalke	Germany	RTL Television	10,340,000		
20 June 2009	Wladimir Klitschko vs. Ruslan Chagaev	Knockout Auf Schalke	United Kingdom	Sky Sports	100,000		
20 March 2010	Wladimir Klitschko vs. Eddie Chambers	Duell Am Rhein	Germany	RTL Television	12,590,000		
11 September 2010	Wladimir Klitschko vs. Samuel Peter II	Showdown in Frankfurt	Germany	RTL Television	9,700,000		
11 September 2010	Wladimir Klitschko vs. Samuel Peter II	Showdown in Frankfurt	Ukraine	Inter	4,200,000		
11 September 2010	Wladimir Klitschko vs. Samuel Peter II	Showdown in Frankfurt	United Kingdom	Sky Sports Main Event	202,000		
2 July 2011	Wladimir Klitschko vs. David Haye	The Talk Ends Now	Worldwide	(multiple)	500,000,000		
2 July 2011	Wladimir Klitschko vs. David Haye	The Talk Ends Now	Austria	RTL Television	497,000		(Note: Viewers aged 12+)
2 July 2011	Wladimir Klitschko vs. David Haye	The Talk Ends Now	Croatia	Nova TV	774,000		
2 July 2011	Wladimir Klitschko vs. David Haye	The Talk Ends Now	Denmark	TV 2 Sport	93,000		
2 July 2011	Wladimir Klitschko vs. David Haye	The Talk Ends Now	Germany	RTL Television	15,560,000		
2 July 2011	Wladimir Klitschko vs. David Haye	The Talk Ends Now	Hungary	Duna TV	1,150,000		
2 July 2011	Wladimir Klitschko vs. David Haye	The Talk Ends Now	Hungary	Duna TV	588,000		
2 July 2011	Wladimir Klitschko vs. David Haye	The Talk Ends Now	Netherlands	RTL 7	507,000		
2 July 2011	Wladimir Klitschko vs. David Haye	The Talk Ends Now	Poland	TVP1	3,388,616		
2 July 2011	Wladimir Klitschko vs. David Haye	The Talk Ends Now	Poland	TVP Sport	3,388,616		
2 July 2011	Wladimir Klitschko vs. David Haye	The Talk Ends Now	Poland	TVP HD	92,000		
2 July 2011	Wladimir Klitschko vs. David Haye	The Talk Ends Now	Ukraine	Inter	9,500,000		
2 July 2011	Wladimir Klitschko vs. David Haye	The Talk Ends Now	United States	HBO	1,242,000		
3 March 2012	Wladimir Klitschko vs. Jean-Marc Mormeck	Alle Gürtel. Ein Champion	Germany	RTL Television	12,260,000		
7 July 2012	Wladimir Klitschko vs. Tony Thompson II	Hard Rocks	Germany	RTL Television	8,360,000		
10 November 2012	Wladimir Klitschko vs. Mariusz Wach	Battle of the Giants	Germany	RTL Television	11,770,000		
10 November 2012	Wladimir Klitschko vs. Mariusz Wach	Battle of the Giants	Hungary	Sport1	500,000		
10 November 2012	Wladimir Klitschko vs. Mariusz Wach	Battle of the Giants	Ukraine	Inter	10,600,000		
4 May 2013	Wladimir Klitschko vs. Francesco Pianeta	Showtime in Mannheim	Germany	RTL Television	8,310,000		
7 October 2013	Wladimir Klitschko vs. Alexander Povetkin	Klitschko vs. Povetkin	Austria	RTL Television	290,000		
7 October 2013	Wladimir Klitschko vs. Alexander Povetkin	Klitschko vs. Povetkin	Croatia	Nova TV	760,000		
7 October 2013	Wladimir Klitschko vs. Alexander Povetkin	Klitschko vs. Povetkin	Czech Republic	Fanda	255,000		(Note: Viewers aged 15+)
7 October 2013	Wladimir Klitschko vs. Alexander Povetkin	Klitschko vs. Povetkin	Germany	RTL Television	11,020,000		
7 October 2013	Wladimir Klitschko vs. Alexander Povetkin	Klitschko vs. Povetkin	Russia	1 Kanal	23,000,000		
7 October 2013	Wladimir Klitschko vs. Alexander Povetkin	Klitschko vs. Povetkin	Slovakia	Dajto	141,000		
7 October 2013	Wladimir Klitschko vs. Alexander Povetkin	Klitschko vs. Povetkin	Ukraine	Inter	23,000,000		
7 October 2013	Wladimir Klitschko vs. Alexander Povetkin	Klitschko vs. Povetkin	Ukraine	Inter	11,000,000		
7 October 2013	Wladimir Klitschko vs. Alexander Povetkin	Klitschko vs. Povetkin	United States	HBO	534,000		
7 October 2013	Wladimir Klitschko vs. Alexander Povetkin	Klitschko vs. Povetkin	United States	HBO	705,000		
26 April 2014	Wladimir Klitschko vs. Alex Leapai	Can't Stop	Germany	RTL Television	8,210,000		
15 November 2014	Wladimir Klitschko vs. Kubrat Pulev	Showdown in Hamburg	Bulgaria	Nova	1,800,000		
15 November 2014	Wladimir Klitschko vs. Kubrat Pulev	Showdown in Hamburg	Croatia	RTL Televizija	631,578		
15 November 2014	Wladimir Klitschko vs. Kubrat Pulev	Showdown in Hamburg	Germany	RTL Television	9,160,000		
15 November 2014	Wladimir Klitschko vs. Kubrat Pulev	Showdown in Hamburg	United States	HBO	620,000		
15 November 2014	Wladimir Klitschko vs. Kubrat Pulev	Showdown in Hamburg	United States	HBO	400,000		
25 April 2015	Wladimir Klitschko vs. Bryant Jennings	The Champion Returns	Ukraine	Inter	2,500,000		
25 April 2015	Wladimir Klitschko vs. Bryant Jennings	The Champion Returns	United States	HBO	1,637,000		
28 November 2015	Wladimir Klitschko vs. Tyson Fury	Collision Course	Croatia	RTL Televizija	681,800		
28 November 2015	Wladimir Klitschko vs. Tyson Fury	Collision Course	Germany	RTL Television	8,910,000		
28 November 2015	Wladimir Klitschko vs. Tyson Fury	Collision Course	Ukraine	Inter	9,700,000		
28 November 2015	Wladimir Klitschko vs. Tyson Fury	Collision Course	United States	HBO	1,038,000		
28 November 2015	Wladimir Klitschko vs. Tyson Fury	Collision Course	United States	HBO	676,000		
28 April 2017	Anthony Joshua vs. Wladimir Klitschko	Joshua vs. Klitschko	Austria	RTL Television	329,000		
28 April 2017	Anthony Joshua vs. Wladimir Klitschko	Joshua vs. Klitschko	Croatia	RTL Televizija	688,953		
28 April 2017	Anthony Joshua vs. Wladimir Klitschko	Joshua vs. Klitschko	Germany	RTL Television	9,590,000		
28 April 2017	Anthony Joshua vs. Wladimir Klitschko	Joshua vs. Klitschko	Poland	Polsat Sport	920,000		
28 April 2017	Anthony Joshua vs. Wladimir Klitschko	Joshua vs. Klitschko	Ukraine	Inter	4,400,000		
28 April 2017	Anthony Joshua vs. Wladimir Klitschko	Joshua vs. Klitschko	United States	Showtime	659,000		
28 April 2017	Anthony Joshua vs. Wladimir Klitschko	Joshua vs. Klitschko	United States	HBO	738,000		
	Combined viewership		Worldwide		1,391,251,331		

=== Pay-per-view bouts ===
Date	Fight	Billing	Pay-per-view buys	Region(s)	Network	Source(s)
14 October 2000	Chris Byrd vs. Wladimir Klitschko	Revenge of the Brother	Not Disclosed	United Kingdom	Sky Box Office	
23 February 2008	Wladimir Klitschko vs. Sultan Ibragimov	The Unification	Not Disclosed	Australia	Main Event	
13 December 2008	Wladimir Klitschko vs. Hasim Rahman	X-Plosive	Not Disclosed	Australia	Main Event	
20 June 2009	Wladimir Klitschko vs. Ruslan Chagaev	Knockout Auf Schalke	Not Disclosed	Australia	Main Event	
20 March 2010	Wladimir Klitschko vs. Eddie Chambers	Duell Am Rhein	Not Disclosed	Australia	Main Event	
20 March 2010	Wladimir Klitschko vs. Eddie Chambers	Duell Am Rhein	Not Disclosed	United Kingdom	Primetime	
20 March 2010	Wladimir Klitschko vs. Eddie Chambers	Duell Am Rhein	300,000	United States, Canada, Puerto Rico	klitschko.com	
11 September 2010	Wladimir Klitschko vs. Samuel Peter II	Showdown in Frankfurt	Not Disclosed	Australia	Main Event	
2 July 2011	Wladimir Klitschko vs. David Haye	The Talk Ends Now	Not Disclosed	Australia	Main Event	
2 July 2011	Wladimir Klitschko vs. David Haye	The Talk Ends Now	Not Disclosed	Spain	Digital+ PPV	
2 July 2011	Wladimir Klitschko vs. David Haye	The Talk Ends Now	1,197,000	United Kingdom	Sky Box Office	
3 March 2012	Wladimir Klitschko vs. Jean-Marc Mormeck	Alle Gürtel. Ein Champion	Not Disclosed	Australia	Main Event	
10 November 2012	Wladimir Klitschko vs. Mariusz Wach	Battle of the Giants	Not Disclosed	Poland	Cyfra+ PPV, Cyfrowy Polsat PPV	
5 October 2013	Wladimir Klitschko vs. Alexander Povetkin	Klitschko vs. Povetkin	Not Disclosed	Australia	Main Event	
26 April 2014	Wladimir Klitschko vs. Alex Leapai	Can't Stop	Not Disclosed	Australia	Main Event	
26 April 2014	Wladimir Klitschko vs. Alex Leapai	Can't Stop	Not Disclosed	New Zealand	Sky Arena	
28 November 2015	Wladimir Klitschko vs. Tyson Fury	Collision Course	655,000	United Kingdom	Sky Box Office	
28 April 2017	Anthony Joshua vs. Wladimir Klitschko	Joshua vs. Klitschko	Not Disclosed	Australia	Main Event	
28 April 2017	Anthony Joshua vs. Wladimir Klitschko	Joshua vs. Klitschko	1,631,000	United Kingdom	Sky Box Office	
	Total sales		3,783,000			

== Filmography ==
Year	Title	Role
2001	Ocean's Eleven	Himself
2007	Rabbit Without Ears	Himself
2009	Rabbit Without Ears 2	Himself
2013	Pain & Gain	Client

== Notes ==
Sporting positions
Regional boxing titles
Vacant Title last held by Ike Ibeabuchi	WBC International heavyweight champion 14 February 1998 – 5 December 1998	Succeeded by Ross Puritty
Vacant Title last held by Donovan Ruddock	WBA Inter-Continental heavyweight champion 17 July 1999 – October 2000; Vacated	Vacant Title next held by Vitali Klitschko
Vacant Title last held by Vitali Klitschko	European heavyweight champion 25 September 1999 – October 2000; Vacated	Vacant Title next held by Vitali Klitschko
Vacant Title last held by Ross Puritty	WBC International heavyweight champion 18 March 2000 – April 2000; Vacated	Vacant Title next held by Henry Akinwande
Vacant Title last held by Vitali Klitschko	WBA Inter-Continental heavyweight champion 30 August 2003 – April 2004; Vacated	Vacant Title next held by Nikolay Valuev
Preceded by Samuel Peter	NABF heavyweight champion 24 September 2005 – April 2006; Vacated	Vacant Title next held by Samuel Peter
Vacant Title last held by DaVarryl Williamson	NABO heavyweight champion 24 September 2005 – April 2006; Vacated	Vacant Title next held by Shannon Briggs
Minor world boxing titles
Vacant Title last held by Lennox Lewis	IBO heavyweight champion 22 April 2006 – 28 November 2015	Succeeded by Tyson Fury
Major world boxing titles
Preceded by Chris Byrd	WBO heavyweight champion 14 October 2000 – 8 March 2003	Succeeded by Corrie Sanders
Preceded by Chris Byrd	IBF heavyweight champion 22 April 2006 – 28 November 2015	Succeeded by Tyson Fury
Preceded by Sultan Ibragimov	WBO heavyweight champion 23 February 2008 – 28 November 2015	Succeeded by Tyson Fury
Vacant Title last held by Vitali Klitschko	The Ring heavyweight champion 20 June 2009 – 28 November 2015	Succeeded by Tyson Fury
New title Unified against David Haye	WBA heavyweight champion Unified title 2 July 2011 – August 2011; Status changed	Vacant Title next held by Tyson Fury
New title	WBA heavyweight champion Super title August 2011 – 28 November 2015	Succeeded by Tyson Fury
Awards
Previous: Adonis Stevenson; TKO1 Chad Dawson	ESPN Knockout of the Year; KO5 Kubrat Pulev; 2014	Next: Canelo Álvarez; KO3 James Kirkland
Previous: Francisco Vargas vs. Orlando Salido	The Ring Fight of the Year vs. Anthony Joshua; 2017	Next: Canelo Álvarez vs. Gennady Golovkin II
Previous: Francisco Vargas vs. Orlando Salido	BWAA Fight of the Year vs. Anthony Joshua; 2017	Next: Jarrett Hurd vs. Erislandy Lara
Previous: Dillian Whyte vs. Derek Chisora; Round 5	ESPN Round of the Year vs. Anthony Joshua; Round 5; 2017	Next: Alex Saucedo vs. Lenny Zappavigna; Round 4
Records
Previous: Joe Louis; 22	Most opponents defeated for world heavyweight championship 23; 25 April 2015 – present	Incumbent
Previous: Joe Louis; 4,270 days	Longest cumulative world heavyweight championship reign 4,382 days 4,271 days on 14 August 2015; 28 November 2015 – present	Incumbent
