= Mario Preskar =

Croatian boxer (born 1984)

Personal information
- Nationality: Croatia
- Born: Mario Preskar; 12 January 1984 (age 42) Zagreb, Croatia
- Height: 6 ft 1 in (1.85 m)
- Weight: Heavyweight

Boxing career
- Stance: Orthodox

Boxing record
- Total fights: 19
- Wins: 16
- Win by KO: 10
- Losses: 0
- Draws: 3
- No contests: 0

Mario Preskar (born 12 January 1984) is a former Croatian professional heavyweight boxer. He trained at Leonardo Boxing Gym in Zagreb with his trainer Leonard Pijetraj.

== Amateur career ==
Preskar was born in Zagreb, Croatia. He began boxing at the age of 9 at the urging of his father Željko, a cab driver. Preskar became a seven-time Croatian national champion, his final amateur record was 45–5.

== Professional career ==
Preskar started his professional career in 2003, at only 19, signing a contract with the world-famous boxing manager Don King. King and Preskar parted ways in September 2008, with King reportedly unwilling to accept new contract terms put forward by Preskar and Pijetraj, who demanded more frequent fights. Preskar founded new opportunities with K2 Promotions, run by the Klitschko brothers.

In his 19th professional fight against Maksym Pedyura on 27 June 2009 in Lviv, Preskar was ahead throughout most of the match, but was knocked down twice in the last round. After the final bell, he collapsed and was immediately taken to hospital. The fight was declared a draw.

Preskar ascribed the incident to extreme exhaustion, due to high temperature and insufficient ventilation in the hall. In August 2009, he announced an indefinite break from boxing, citing lack of motivation. In May 2010 he collapsed while training, and was diagnosed with epilepsy.

As of 2019, Preskar is working as a boxing coach and a boxing commentator for RTL Televizija.

== Professional boxing record ==
| 19 fights | 16 wins | 0 losses |
|---|---|---|
| By knockout | 10 | 0 |
| By decision | 6 | 0 |
| Draws | 3 | |

| No. | Result | Record | Opponent | Type | Round, time | Date | Location | Notes |
|---|---|---|---|---|---|---|---|---|
| 19 | Draw | 16–0–3 | Maksym Pedyura | PTS | 8 | 27 June 2009 | Sportpalace, Lviv, Ukraine | |
| 18 | Win | 16–0–2 | Daniil Peretyatko | UD | 8 | 30 May 2009 | Palace of Sports, Kyiv, Ukraine | |
| 17 | Win | 15–0–2 | Zurab Noniashvili | RTD | 3 (8), 3:00 | 28 March 2009 | Budivelnik, Cherkasy, Ukraine | |
| 16 | Win | 14–0–2 | Hans Joerg Blasko | RTD | 3 (6), 3:00 | 13 December 2008 | SAP Arena, Mannheim , Germany | |
| 15 | Draw | 13–0–2 | Miyan Solomons | SD | 8 | 29 September 2007 | Große EWE Arena, Oldenburg, Germany | |
| 14 | Win | 13–0–1 | Carl Gathright | RTD | 3 (8), 3:00 | 9 June 2007 | Spodek, Katowice, Poland | |
| 13 | Win | 12–0–1 | Paolo Ferrara | UD | 8 | 20 January 2007 | St. Jakobshalle, Basel, Switzerland | |
| 12 | Win | 11–0–1 | Gene Valdez | TKO | 1 (8), 1:58 | 4 November 2006 | Chase Field, Phoenix, Arizona, US | |
| 11 | Win | 10–0–1 | Matthew Greer | UD | 6 | 8 July 2006 | Savvis Center, St Louis, Missouri, US | |
| 10 | Win | 9–0–1 | Ervin Slonka | TKO | 6 (6) | 17 December 2005 | Max-Schmeling-Halle, Berlin, Germany | |
| 9 | Win | 8–0–1 | Danut Moisa | KO | 2 (4) | 12 December 2005 | Bordelandhalle, Magdeburg, Germany | |
| 8 | Win | 7–0–1 | Vlado Szabo | RTD | 2 (6), 3:00 | 15 October 2005 | Mehrzweckhalle Sued, Düsseldorf, Germany | |
| 7 | Win | 6–0–1 | Mark Miller | UD | 4 | 28 October 2004 | The Plex, North Charleston, South Carolina, US | |
| 6 | Win | 5–0–1 | Danny Wayland | KO | 1 (4) | 2 October 2004 | Madison Square Garden, New York City, New York, US | |
| 5 | Win | 4–0–1 | John Turlington | UD | 4 | 4 September 2004 | Mandalay Bay Resort & Casino, Paradise, Nevada, US | |
| 4 | Draw | 3–0–1 | Marcelino Novaes | UD | 4 | 15 May 2004 | Mandalay Bay Resort & Casino, Paradise, Nevada, US | |
| 3 | Win | 3–0 | Rubin Bracero | UD | 4 | 1 May 2004 | Jai-Alai Fronton, Miami, Florida, US | |
| 2 | Win | 2–0 | He Man Gipson | KO | 1 (4), 2:09 | 10 April 2004 | Mandalay Bay Resort & Casino, Paradise, Nevada, US | |
| 1 | Win | 1–0 | Roman Armstrong | TKO | 1 (4), 1:59 | 12 July 2003 | Orleans Hotel & Casino, Paradise, Nevada, US | |
