= Wladimir Klitschko vs. Hasim Rahman =

Boxing match

X-Plosive
- Date: 13 December 2008
- Venue: SAP Arena, Mannheim, Baden-Württemberg, Germany
- Title(s) on the line: IBF, WBO and IBO heavyweight titles

Tale of the tape
Boxer	Wladimir Klitschko	Hasim Rahman
Nickname	Dr. Steelhammer	The Rock
Hometown	Kyiv, Ukraine	Baltimore, Maryland, U.S.
Pre-fight record	51–3 (44 KO)	45–6–2 (1) (36 KO)
Age	32 years, 8 months	36 years, 1 month
Height	6 ft 6 in (198 cm)	6 ft 2 in (188 cm)
Weight	245 lb (111 kg)	255 lb (116 kg)
Style	Orthodox	Orthodox
Recognition	IBF, WBO and IBO; Heavyweight Champion; The Ring; No. 1 Ranked Heavyweight	IBF; No. 4 Ranked Heavyweight; WBO; No. 8 Ranked Heavyweight; Former unified heavyweight champion

Result
- Klitschko wins via 7th-round technical knockout

Wladimir Klitschko vs. Hasim Rahman, billed as X-Plosive, was a professional boxing match contested on 13 December 2008 for the IBF, WBO, and IBO heavyweight championship.

== Background ==
After unifying the IBF & WBO title by defeating Sultan Ibragimov, Wladimir Klitschko made one title defence against WBO mandatory challenger Tony Thompson before agreeing to face his IBF mandatory Alexander Povetkin. In October 2008 Povetkin withdrew with a leg injury, and with the second and third ranked contenders Alexander Dimitrenko and Chris Arreola unavailable, Klitschko agreed to face former unified champion and fourth ranked IBF contender Hasim Rahman.

Before agreeing to face Klitschko, Rahman had won four of his five fights since losing his WBC title in a close fight to Oleg Maskaev, the fifth was a no contest with James Toney. He was the NABF continental champion, having defeated Zuri Lawrence for the title in 2007, and was retroactively ranked the world's 9th best heavyweight that year by BoxRec. He was also ranked within the top ten by both the IBF and WBO, and 12th by the WBC. He was aiming to join Muhammad Ali, Evander Holyfield, and Lennox Lewis as the only boxers ever to win a heavyweight title on three or more occasions.

On the undercard, former Undisputed Heavyweight Champion Riddick Bowe fought what would turn out to be the final fight of his career, beating journeyman Gene Pukall by an 8-round unanimous decision.

== The fight ==
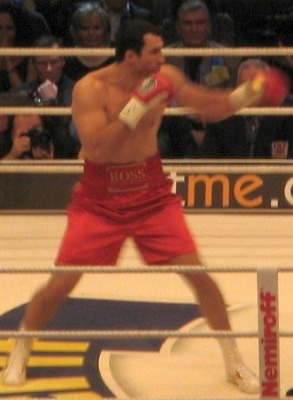
Klitschko in action against Rahman

Klitschko dominated the fight winning every round on the scorecards (two judges had it 60–53, the third scored it 60–47), scoring a knockdown the 6th round with a series of jabs followed by a right hand to the chin of Rahman who survived before referee Tony Weeks ended the fight in the seventh round. According to CompuBox Klitschko landed 178 punches with 48% accuracy, against Rahman's 30 punches with 14% accuracy.

== Aftermath ==
After his victory, Klitschko agreed to face former unified cruiserweight champion David Haye in Germany in June 2009, however, Haye pulled out and was replaced by the WBA "Champion In recess" Ruslan Chagaev.

Rahman would spend 15 months out of the ring after this fight before returning to knockout his next five opponents before losing in two rounds to Povetkin. He would retire after a decision loss to the unknown Anthony Nansen in June 2014.

== Undercard ==
Confirmed bouts:

Winner	Loser	Weight division/title belt(s) disputed	Result
(United States) Cornelius Bundrage	(Russia) Zaurbek Baysangurov	Super Welterweight (12 rounds)	5th-round TKO.
(Germany) Wilhelm Fischer	(Latvia) Edgars Kalnars	Heavyweight (8 rounds)	4th-round KO.
(United States) Riddick Bowe	(Germany) Gene Pukall	Heavyweight (8 rounds)	Unanimous decision.
(Germany) Robin Krasniqi	(Germany) Lars Buchholz	Light Heavyweight (6 rounds)	Unanimous decision.
(Croatia) Mario Preskar	(Germany) Hans-Joerg Blasko	Heavyweight (8 rounds)	3rd-round RTD.
(Albania) Fatjon Murati	(Austria) Omar Jatta	Light Heavyweight (4 rounds)	Unanimous decision.

== Broadcasting ==
Country	Broadcaster
Canada	TSN
Germany	RTL
Hungary	Sport 1
Russia	RTR Sport
Ukraine	Inter
United Kingdom	Setanta Sports
United States	HBO

Preceded by vs. Tony Thompson	Wladimir Klitschko's bouts 13 December 2008	Succeeded by vs. Ruslan Chagaev
Preceded by vs. James Toney II	Hasim Rahman's bouts 13 December 2008	Succeeded by vs. Clinton Boldridge
