= Nathaniel Fitch =

American boxer (born 1956)

- Fitch (left) assisting on the mitts (U.S. Army Photo)

Personal information
- Nickname: Sweet Red
- Born: Nathaniel Fitch Sr. Bastrop, Louisiana

Boxing career

Nathaniel Fitch Sr. (born October 31, 1956) is an American former heavyweight boxer best known for his stellar amateur boxing career.

== Early years ==
"Years ago I was at a Boys Club and some guys took my bike and my brothers went to retrieve it and I'll just say I was impressed with the way they did it," said Fitch. "From that point forward I knew I wanted to learn to box."

In 1977, Fitch enlisted in the U.S. Army where he began his career as an amateur boxer. He transferred to Fort Bragg in 1983.

== Amateur career ==
Fitch went on to win the 1983 All-Army Championship, the 1983 Interservice Championship, the 1984 Olympic Sports Festival, the 1985 National Amateur Boxing Federation Championship, the 1987 National Golden Gloves Championship and the 1987 Eastern Olympic Trials.

=== Accomplishments ===
- (gold) 1983 All-Army Champion (+201 lbs)
- (gold) 1983 Interservice Champion
- (gold) 1984 U.S. Olympic Festival Winner (+201 lbs)
- (gold) 1985 United States (AAU) Amateur Champion (+201 lbs)
- (gold) 1987 National Golden Gloves Super Heavyweight Champion (+201 lbs)
- 1987 Eastern Olympic Trials: Qualified (+201 lbs)
- 1988 National Olympic Trials: in quarterfinals lost to Riddick Bowe by unanimous decision, 5–0

He finished his amateur career with a record of 187 wins, 16 losses and 1 draw.

== Professional career ==
Fitch turned pro in 1988 and had limited success. His resume included losses to notable heavyweights Lou Savarese, Tim Witherspoon, Bruce Seldon, Jeremy Williams, Chris Byrd, and John Ruiz. He retired in 1997 after a decision loss to Timo Hoffmann.

== Professional boxing record ==
12 Wins (8 knockouts, 4 decisions), 19 Losses (10 knockouts, 9 decisions), 1 No Contest Archived December 4, 2014, at the Wayback Machine
Result	Record	Opponent	Type	Round	Date	Location	Notes
Loss	5-0	(Germany) Timo Hoffmann	PTS	6	05/10/1997	Gera, Germany	
Loss	9-0	(United States) Najee Shaheed	TKO	5	23/01/1997	(United States) Boston, Massachusetts, U.S.	
Loss	19-1	(United States) Terrence Lewis	KO	4	06/12/1996	(United States) Philadelphia, Pennsylvania, U.S.	
Loss	27-3	(United States) John Ruiz	TKO	3	25/10/1996	(United States) Boston, Massachusetts, U.S.	
Loss	15-0	(United States) Richie Melito	TKO	1	17/07/1996	(United States) New York City, New York U.S.	
Win	0-6	(United States) Steve West	TKO	2	06/04/1996	(United States) Fayetteville, North Carolina, U.S.	
Loss	20-0	(United States) Don Steele	TKO	5	19/12/1995	(United States) Columbia, South Carolina, U.S.	
Loss	12-0	(United States) Chris Byrd	KO	7	03/10/1995	(United States) Flint, Michigan, U.S.	
Win	0-1	(United States) Larry Donnell	TKO	1	27/09/1995	(United States) Raleigh, North Carolina, U.S.	
Loss	22-1	(United States) Boone Pultz	UD	8	14/09/1995	(United States) Greenbelt, Maryland, U.S.	
Loss	14-0	(Canada) Kirk Johnson	PTS	10	07/07/1995	(United States) Bossier City, Louisiana, U.S.	
Loss	6-2-2	(United States) Sam Hampton	PTS	8	11/04/1995	(United States) Woodlawn, Maryland, U.S.	
Loss	15-0	(Croatia) Zeljko Mavrovic	KO	1	11/02/1995	Frankfurt, Germany	
Loss	39-4	(United States) Tim Witherspoon	TKO	6	17/12/1994	(United States) Atlantic City, New Jersey, U.S.	
No Contest	9-6	(United States) Stanley Wright	NC	2	20/07/1994	(United States) Raleigh, North Carolina, U.S.	
Loss	28-3	(United States) Bruce Seldon	TKO	4	19/02/1994	(United States) Charlotte, North Carolina, U.S.	IBF Intercontinental Heavyweight Title.
Loss	12-0	(United States) Jeremy Williams	RTD	7	09/11/1993	(United States) Fargo, North Dakota, U.S.	Fitch retired at the end of the seventh round.
Loss	25-0	(United States) Lou Savarese	UD	10	17/04/1993	(United States) Bushkill, Pennsylvania, U.S.	
Loss	17-6	(United States) Levi Billups	UD	10	25/01/1993	(United States) Inglewood, California, U.S.	
Win	22-13	(United States) Ricky Parkey	TKO	5	24/10/1992	(United States) Charleston, South Carolina, U.S.	
Win	30-17	(United States) Mike Cohen	PTS	8	26/06/1992	Jacksonville, Florida, U.S.	
Win	11-18-2	(United States) Danny Wofford	PTS	4	20/05/1992	(United States) Concord, North Carolina, U.S.	
Win	13-44-2	(United States) Frankie Hines	TKO	1	24/04/1992	(United States) Raleigh, North Carolina, U.S.	
Loss	6-1	(United States) Everett Mayo	UD	10	27/02/1992	(United States) Virginia Beach, Virginia, U.S.	
Loss	7-4	(United States) Jerry Jones	SD	8	06/02/1992	(United States) Glen Burnie, Maryland, U.S.	
Win	26-2-2	(United States) Terry Davis	KO	1	12/11/1991	(United States) Jacksonville, Florida, U.S.	
Win	8-0-1	(United States) Fred Adams	UD	6	18/10/1991	(United States) Tampa, Florida, U.S.	
Win	--	(United States) Charlie Harris	KO	2	03/08/1991	(United States) Pensacola, Florida, U.S.	
Win	1-5-1	(United States) Sonny Crooms	TKO	2	28/04/1991	(United States) Raleigh, North Carolina, U.S.	
Win	4-16	(United States) Charles Dixon	KO	2	15/02/1991	(United States) Dothan, Alabama, U.S.	
Win	--	(United States) Lynwood Barry	DQ	2	18/11/1990	(United States) Portsmouth, Virginia, U.S.	
Loss	4-1	(United States) Fred Whitaker	PTS	4	16/09/1988	(United States) Winston-Salem, North Carolina, U.S.	

== Retirement and later life ==
Upon retirement Fitch became a boxing coach at Fitch's Boxing Club in Spring Lake, North Carolina.

He was also inducted into the North Carolina Boxing Hall Fame.

Preceded by Warren Thompson	United States Amateur Super Heavyweight Champion; 1984	Succeeded by Wesley Watson
