= Lennox Lewis vs. Vitali Klitschko =

Boxing competition in 2003

Battle of the Titans
- Date: June 21, 2003
- Venue: Staples Center, Los Angeles, California, U.S.
- Title(s) on the line: WBC, IBO, and The Ring heavyweight titles

Tale of the tape
Boxer	Lennox Lewis	Vitali Klitschko
Nickname	The Lion	Dr. Ironfist
Hometown	London, England	Kyiv, Ukraine
Purse	$7,000,000	$1,400,000
Pre-fight record	40–2–1 (31 KO)	32–1 (31 KO)
Age	37 years, 9 months	31 years, 11 months
Height	6 ft 5 in (196 cm)	6 ft 7 in (201 cm)
Weight	256 1/2 lb (116 kg)	248 lb (112 kg)
Style	Orthodox	Orthodox
Recognition	WBC, IBO, and The Ring; Heavyweight Champion; The Ring No. 9 ranked pound-for-pound fighter	WBC/WBA; No. 1 Ranked Heavyweight; The Ring; No. 10 Ranked Heavyweight

Result
- Lewis wins via 6th-round corner retirement

Lennox Lewis vs. Vitali Klitschko, billed as Battle of the Titans, was a heavyweight professional boxing match contested between WBC, IBO, and The Ring champion Lennox Lewis and former WBO titleholder Vitali Klitschko. The bout took place on June 21, 2003 at the Staples Center in Los Angeles, California. Lewis defeated Klitschko via sixth-round corner retirement (RTD) after the fight was stopped due to a severe cut above Klitschko's left eye. It was the last fight of Lewis' career, having decided to retire after eventually rejecting a rematch.

== Background ==
A year earlier, Lennox Lewis had finally met Mike Tyson in the ring and achieved a landmark victory by knocking Tyson out in the eighth round of their record-breaking PPV fight. Following his victory, Lewis took a year-long break from the ring, eventually vacating his IBF title after passing on the chance to face the IBF's number one contender Chris Byrd. Instead, Lewis turned his sights on a possible match with Vitali Klitschko, who had become the WBC's number one contender after defeating Larry Donald by tenth-round technical knockout. In early 2003, however, negotiations for the fight fell through and Lewis began looking into a lucrative rematch with Tyson. The WBC ruled that a rematch with Tyson would be allowed on the basis that the winner would next defend their title against Klitschko. Tyson passed on the rematch, forcing Lewis to accept a less marketable fight against Kirk Johnson in which only Lewis' IBO title would be on the line. Klitschko was to fight on the undercard and take on Lewis in December. Before the Lewis–Johnson fight could take place, Johnson was forced to pull out with a chest injury. As such, Lewis and Klitschko agreed to face one another on June 21, rather than later in the year as originally planned.

Former U.S. Armed Forces Super Heavyweight Boxing Champion Preston Hartzog was one of Klitschko's sparring partners during his training camp, and said Lewis would have trouble with Vitali's awkward style.

== The fight ==
Klitschko, who came into the fight as the underdog, was able to get off to a strong start in the fight. Klitschko was the aggressor through the first two rounds and landed many hard shots to the head of Lewis, winning both rounds on all three judges' scorecards. In the second round, Klitschko was able to stagger Lewis with two hard right hands that opened a cut under Lewis' left eye. In the third round, Lewis came out aggressively and landed a strong right hand within the first 10 seconds that opened up a deep cut above Klitschko's left eye. Despite his injury, Klitschko fought a close round with Lewis as the two fighters traded jabs and power punches, though Lewis was able to win the round on the scorecards. Klitschko rebounded to take round four in which both fighters appeared to be fatigued. In round five, Lewis landed several consecutive hard punches to Klitschko's ribs with his right hand while in a clinch with Klitschko, with HBO commentators disagreeing on the legality of the punches. By the time round five had ended, the condition of Klitschko's eye had grown worse, with the corner camera broadcasting the severe open wound, but the fight was allowed to continue into round six. Lewis took advantage of Klitschko's impaired vision to land a hard uppercut in the sixth round. Both fighters looked exhausted, often staggering after coming together. Between rounds six and seven, it was determined by the ringside doctor that the damage to Klitschko's eye had become too severe and the fight was stopped. Because Klitschko's injury was a result of punches from Lewis, Lewis was named the winner of the fight by corner retirement. Klitschko was ahead 58–56 on the scorecards, with two judges giving Lewis rounds three and six, and the other giving Lewis rounds five and six.

== Aftermath ==
Because Klitschko was winning when the fight was stopped, there was much demand for a rematch between the two. Lewis initially welcomed the idea, stating after his victory that he hoped to face Klitschko once more in either November or December 2003. Klitschko's eye injury had healed to the point that he had been cleared to face Lewis and a tentative date of December 6 was set for the rematch. In August, however, Lewis changed his mind and pulled out of the bout, stating his intentions to not fight at all for the remainder of 2003. Instead, Klitschko boxed Kirk Johnson in a WBC title eliminator on December 6, 2003 to determine who would face Lewis next. Klitschko easily dispatched Johnson, winning by second-round technical knockout, to set up a rematch with Lewis. However, Lewis announced his retirement two months later on February 7, 2004, vacating his titles in the process. Two months later, Klitschko met the WBC's number two ranked contender and then-reigning WBO champion Corrie Sanders, who had defeated Klitschko's brother Wladimir in March 2003 to win the vacant WBC and The Ring heavyweight titles. Klitschko defeated Sanders, who relinquished his WBO title to fight Klitschko, by eighth-round technical knockout.

== Undercard ==
Confirmed bouts:

== Broadcasting ==
The fight, which aired on HBO, was watched in 4.6 million homes, translating to a 13.4 HBO rating. That was the best rating for a HBO boxing telecast since Oscar De La Hoya vs. Oba Carr on May 22, 1999. It was also the highest rating for a HBO boxing heavyweight fight since Shannon Briggs' defeat of George Foreman on Nov. 22, 1997, which earned a 14.9 rating.

Country	Broadcaster
Australia	Main Event
United Kingdom	Sky Sports
United States	HBO

Preceded by vs. Mike Tyson	Lennox Lewis' bouts 12 June 2003	Retired
Preceded by vs. Larry Donald	Vitali Klitschko's bouts 12 June 2003	Succeeded by vs. Kirk Johnson
