= Samson Poʻuha =

American boxer

Samson Po'uha (born June 2, 1971) is a Tongan former professional boxer who competed from 1992 to 2002.

== Background ==
Po'uha was born into a Mormon family in Los Angeles, California and was raised in Utah.

== Boxing career ==
=== Amateur ===
Highly-touted as an amateur, Po'uha was a National Golden Gloves Super Heavyweight Champion in 1991 and United States (National AAU) amateur Super Heavyweight champion in 1992. During his amateur career, he defeated Larry Donald, Darroll Wilson, and Cuban star Roberto Balado.

=== Professional ===
After turning professional in 1992, Po'uha showed good power, but was often out of shape.

He lost to former amateur Craig Payne, (then 11-8), in 1994, and never became a major contender.

He lost by technical knockout to then-undefeated Andrew Golota in a fight, where Golota was nearly knocked out by Po'uha, out of desperation he resorted to biting Po'uha on the side of his neck during a clinch.

Po'uha later lost to a journeyman Jesse Ferguson.

Overall he had a pro career record of 20-5-1 with 18 KOs. He retired in 2003.

== Professional boxing record ==
20 Wins (18 knockouts, 2 decisions), 5 Losses (3 knockouts, 2 decisions), 1 Draw Archived March 27, 2015, at the Wayback Machine
Result	Record	Opponent	Type	Round	Date	Location	Notes
Loss	19-6-1	Sherman Williams	MD	10	21/04/2002	Laughlin, Nevada, U.S.	
Draw	37-22-3	Frankie Swindell	PTS	5	30/01/2002	Miami Beach, Florida, U.S.	
Win	11-20-3	Louis Monaco	KO	8	05/05/2000	Las Vegas, Nevada, U.S.	Monaco knocked out at 1:27 of the eighth round.
Loss	15-17-3	David Vedder	PTS	6	12/06/1999	Saint George, Utah, U.S.	
Loss	23-16	Jesse Ferguson	TKO	8	31/05/1997	Atlantic City, New Jersey, U.S.	Referee stopped the bout at 2:53 of the eighth round.
Win	33-16	Bert Cooper	TKO	4	22/04/1997	Auburn Hills, Michigan, U.S.	Referee stopped the bout at 1:36 of the fourth round.
Win	31-14-1	Frankie Swindell	SD	10	05/04/1997	Albuquerque, New Mexico, U.S.	
Win	9-4-1	Jimmy Haynes	TKO	2	28/01/1997	Auburn Hills, Michigan, U.S.	Referee stopped the bout at 2:00 of the second round.
Win	3-4-2	Patrick Freeman	UD	4	15/07/1996	Laughlin, Nevada, U.S.	
Loss	23-0	Andrew Golota	TKO	5	16/05/1995	Atlantic City, New Jersey, U.S.	Referee stopped the bout at 2:44 of the fifth round.
Win	11-5-1	Martin Foster	TKO	1	19/01/1995	Auburn Hills, Michigan, U.S.	Referee stopped the bout at 2:30 of the first round.
Win	10-2	Jeff Lally	KO	1	08/12/1994	Las Vegas, Nevada, U.S.	
Win	11-30	John Morton	KO	1	17/11/1994	Saint George, Utah, U.S.	
Loss	11-8-1	Craig Payne	TKO	6	30/06/1994	Mesquite, Nevada, U.S.	
Win	5-8-6	David Graves	KO	7	14/01/1994	Saint George, Utah, U.S.	
Win	16-10-2	Mike Rouse	TKO	8	16/11/1993	Bay Saint Louis, Mississippi, U.S.	
Win	18-3-2	Jason Waller	TKO	1	05/10/1993	Las Vegas, Nevada, U.S.	Referee stopped the bout at 1:47 of the first round.
Win	4-7	Carl McGrew	TKO	1	04/09/1993	Las Vegas, Nevada, U.S.	
Win	10-9	Al Shoffner	TKO	2	30/08/1993	Kansas City, Missouri, U.S.	
Win	26-15-1	Eddie Gonzales	KO	1	05/08/1993	Las Vegas, Nevada, U.S.	
Win	2-2	Domingo Monroe	TKO	2	15/07/1993	Mashantucket, Connecticut, U.S.	
Win	10-8-1	Mike Acklie	KO	1	26/06/1993	Saint George, Utah, U.S.	
Win	7-3	Warren Williams	TKO	1	06/06/1993	Las Vegas, Nevada, U.S.	
Win	9-0	Willie Jackson	TKO	1	03/04/1993	Las Vegas, Nevada, U.S.	
Win	1-0	Patrick Smith	TKO	4	14/02/1993	Las Vegas, Nevada, U.S.	
Win	6-16	Steve Cortez	KO	1	25/11/1992	Las Vegas, Nevada, U.S.	

Preceded by Larry Donald	United States Amateur Super Heavyweight Champion; 1992	Succeeded by Jo-el Scott
