= Ed Donaldson =

American boxer

Personal information
- Nationality: United States
- Born: Ed Donaldson; January 1, 1959 (age 67) Mobile, Alabama U.S.
- Weight: Heavyweight

Boxing career

Boxing record
- Total fights: 18
- Wins: 11
- Win by KO: 9
- Losses: 7
- Draws: 0

Ed Donaldson (born January 1, 1959, in Mobile, Alabama), was a professional boxer.

== Amateur ==
As an amateur, Donaldson was a United States (National AAU) amateur Super Heavyweight champion in 1992.

== Professional career ==
Donaldson, a full-time police officer, turned pro 1992 with first round knock out of Ben Green. His next fight he went the distance decisioning a tough Warren Williams who sported a decent record of 6–1. He then suffered his first defeat to fringe contender James Gains.

Donaldson then had a string of first-round knockouts, before facing Kirk Johnson. Donaldson was KO'd in the 5th.

Following the loss, Donaldson put together his best win streak. The streak climaxed with a brutal second round blow out of undefeated prospect Quinn Navarre. Quinn was entering the ring undefeated in 11 pro outings, while Ed was a deceiving 7-2.

Donaldson then took on Alex Garcia, who sported an impressive 35-4-1 record. He kept the pressure on and took Garcia the distance, but lost a ten-round decision. Impressed with Donaldson's durability and showing, ESPN offered a fight with Jimmy Thunder on national TV. Thunder took Donaldson out in the second round.

=== Fight Against Holmes ===
After the loss, Larry Holmes lined up a fight with Donaldson on ESPN. The fight started out with Larry winning solely on his jab, then rocking a tense looking Donaldson with right hands. Donaldson got bolder and started firing his jabs and righthands finding mild success. The fight was a rough and tumble affair with Ed pushing Larry back with bull charges and Larry losing his footing with his back foot slipping off the ring apron and causing him to fall to the canvas twice. It looked as if Holmes was en route to a decision when Holmes crashed home a devastating right hand that was reminiscent of the one that crushed Mike Weaver. Donaldson struggled to his feet just as the ref counted ten. For a brief moment it appeared the ref might stop it, but he didn't and the bell saved Donaldson from Holmes' follow up. The beginning of the ninth round had Larry trying to finish with Donaldson on shaky legs. By the middle of the round Donaldson had his legs back. Donaldson was able to hang on for the remainder of the fight, but lost a decision.

After the loss, he returned to the ring at 37 years old to fight the undefeated Michael Grant (boxer). Donaldson was never in the fight and Grant took him out in the third. A year later Donaldson was to fight again. It was only his second fight in three years and by now he was 38. He fought Keith McKnight. McKnight took the decision.

Donaldson's then retired with a record of 11–7 with 9 of his wins coming by knockout, and 5 of those knockouts were in the first round.

Preceded by Robert Salters	United States Amateur Super Heavyweight Champion; 1989	Succeeded by Edward Escobedo
