= Wesley Watson =

American boxer (born 1962)

- Born: Wesley Page Watson Jr. September 16, 1962 (age 63); Bristol, Tennessee, U.S.
- Boxing career
- Years active: 1987–1990; 1995–1996
- Height: 5 ft 8 in (173 cm)
- Weight: Heavyweight

Wesley Page Watson Jr. (born September 16, 1962, in Bristol, Tennessee) is a retired American heavyweight boxer best known for his successful amateur boxing career.

== Early years ==
Watson played three years of varsity basketball at Howard before transferring to Dickinson High his senior year, where he was a starter on Coach Jim Realer's Rams. Watson never fought officially before he joined the military in August 1981, two months after he graduated from Dickinson. "I first started boxing in April 1983," said Watson in an interview. Though his actual first fight appeared to be an unsanctioned fight against fellow Howard teammate named Arthur Carter, for which they both were being detained in the school disciplinarian's office. Lee Roy DeShazor, school disciplinarian, told, "When I walked into Lee Roy's office and saw Watson crying, I was completely shocked, and also a little disappointed," said Lee, never dreaming that a few years later Wesley Watson would surface as a national, amateur, super heavyweight boxing champion.

Charlie Messina, fight promoter manager, said Watson lived on Washington Street before joining the Army. "I remember he came to the West Center City Community Center one night and sparred against Henry Milligan," Messina said.

== Military service ==
Wesley Watson started boxing while serving in the U.S. Army. He was stationed in Fort Bragg and his latest military rank was corporal.

== Amateur career ==
Watson became the 1985 U.S. Army and inter-service super heavyweight champion, 1985 National AAU Super Heavyweight Champion (201 lbs. or more), representing the Army. He qualified to the All-American Boxing Team by the United States Amateur Boxing Committee. Watson qualified for the 1986 Goodwill Games, but neither he nor the remaining eight Army boxers, who qualified for the U.S. Goodwill Team, participated in the Games for non-specified political reasons.

=== Highlights ===
Unsanctioned match-up (+201 lbs), Howard Career Center, Wilmington, Delaware, 1980:

- Lost to Arthur Carter

Local match-up (+201 lbs), Charlotte Speedway, Charlotte, North Carolina, June 1983 (debut):

- Defeated ? by split decision, 3–2

(gold) All-Army Championships (+201 lbs), 1984:

- (no data available)

(gold) United States Armed Forces Championships (+201 lbs), Little Creek, Virginia, November 1984:

- (no data available)

USA−Argentina Duals (+201 lbs), Maude Cobb Activity Center, Longview, Texas, January 1985:

- Defeated Juan Antonio Díaz (Argentina) KO 1 (0:43)

National Championships (+201 lbs), Indianapolis, Indiana, November 1984:

- 1/2: Lost to Nathaniel Fitch by majority decision, 1−4

USA−USSR Heavy Duals (+201 lbs), Sands Hotel and Casino, Atlantic City, New Jersey, October 1985:

- Defeated Valeriy Abadzhyan (Soviet Union) RSCI 2 (stopped after Abadzhyan received a bloody cut over his eye)

(gold) All-Army Championships (+201 lbs), 1985:

- (no data available)

(gold) United States Armed Forces Championships (+201 lbs), Camp Lejeune, North Carolina, November 1985:

- (no data available)

(gold) National Championships (+201 lbs), Tulsa, Oklahoma, December 1985:

- 1/2: Defeated Kevin Ford RSC 2
- Finals: Defeated Sinclair Babb by unanimous decision, 5–0

Local match-up (+201 lbs), 1986:

- Defeated Alex García by split decision, 3–2

National Championships (+201 lbs), Civic Center, Beaumont, Texas, April 1986:

- 1/2: Defeated George Kilbert Pierce DQ 3 (2:52)
- Finals: Lost to Alex García by majority decision, 1−4 (Watson was given a standing eight count in the 3rd rd)

World Champ Box-offs (+201 lbs), Caesars Tahoe, Lake Tahoe, Nevada, April 1986:

- Finals: Lost to Alex García RSC 2 (2:41)

District of Columbia Mayor's Cup Invitational Tournament (+201 lbs), Washington, D.C., July 1986:

- Defeated Anthony Green KO 2 (2:51)

USA−USSR Middle & Heavy Duals (+201 lbs), ARCO Arena, Sacramento, California, July 1986:

- Lost to Aleksandr Miroshnichenko (Soviet Union) KO 1 (1:01)

Watson finished his amateur career with a record of 42 wins, 7 losses. He was rated the #1 American amateur superheavyweight by the United States Amateur Boxing Federation in February 1987. He turned pro soon after being discharged from the Army.

== Professional career ==
Watson turned pro in 1987 and won his first 10 bouts before stepping up in class and losing to Bernardo Mercado in 1988. After another string of victories he faced Michael Dokes but lost via third-round TKO. In December 1989, he fought an exhibition against Gerry Cooney. In his next fight he was TKO'd by Ray Mercer and retired. He returned to the sport five years later but retired again after two victories.

== Professional boxing record ==
17 Wins (13 knockouts, 4 decisions), 3 Losses (3 knockouts, 0 decisions)
Result	Opp Record	Opponent	Type	Round	Date	Location	Notes
Win	4-12	(United States) Dwayne Hall	TKO	1	16 Apr 1996	Wilmington, Delaware, United States	
Win	3-11	(United States) William "Gladiator" Campudani	KO	1	19 Dec 1995	Columbia, South Carolina, United States	
Loss	12-0	(United States) "Merciless" Ray Mercer	TKO	5	15 Jan 1990	Atlantic City, New Jersey, United States	Referee stopped the bout at 0:44 of the fifth round.
Loss	38-2-2	(United States) Michael "Dynamite" Dokes	TKO	3	24 Aug 1989	New York City, United States	Referee stopped the bout at 2:25 of the third round.
Win	debut	(United States) Anthony Green	KO	1	12 Jun 1989	Erlanger, Kentucky, United States	
Win	0-4	(United States) Randy Davis	KO	2	22 May 1989	Bowling Green, Kentucky, United States	
Win	3-17	(United States) James Holly	KO	2	13 May 1989	Bristol, Tennessee, United States	
Win	25-15	(United States) Danny Sutton	PTS	10	24 Mar 1989	Louisville, Kentucky, United States	
Win	3-25	(United States) Larry Givens	UD	8	12 Nov 1988	Bristol, Tennessee, United States	
Loss	32-4	(Colombia) Bernardo Mercado	TKO	1	13 Aug 1988	Bristol, Tennessee, United States	
Win	1-6	(United States) John "The Salt" Morton	PTS	10	23 Jul 1988	Bristol, Tennessee, United States	
Win	10-24-1	(United States) Frankie Hines	TKO	1	25 Jun 1988	Bristol, Tennessee, United States	
Win	0-1	(United States) Calvin "Concrete" Jones	TKO	2	16 Jan 1988	Bristol, Tennessee, United States	Referee stopped the bout at 2:27 of the second round.
Win	0-7	(United States) Jeff Burg	TKO	1	28 Nov 1987	Bristol, Tennessee, United States	
Win	1-5	(United States) "Mean" Joe Adams	TKO	3	19 Nov 1987	Tulsa, Oklahoma, United States	
Win	1-0	(United States) Darryl Rouse	TKO	4	29 Sep 1987	Tulsa, Oklahoma, United States	
Win	4-15-1	(United States) Wesley Smith	PTS	6	19 Sep 1987	Bristol, Tennessee, United States	
Win	0-4	(United States) Ray Sims	TKO	2	24 Aug 1987	Louisville, Kentucky, United States	Referee stopped the bout at 2:57 of the second round.
Win	0-3	(United States) Mark "The Spark" Green	KO	1	11 Jul 1987	Bristol, Tennessee, United States	
Win	debut	Troy Whitehead	KO	1	9 May 1987	Bristol, Tennessee, United States	

Preceded by Nathaniel Fitch	United States Amateur Super Heavyweight Champion; 1985	Succeeded by Alex Garcia
