= Alex García (boxer) =

American boxer (born 1961)

Personal information
- Nicknames: Jaws; The San Fernando Hammer
- Nationality: Mexican American
- Born: Alex Peter García; December 2, 1961 (age 64) North Hollywood, California
- Height: 6 ft 2 in (188 cm)
- Weight: Heavyweight

Boxing career
- Reach: 78 in (198 cm)
- Stance: Orthodox

Boxing record
- Total fights: 47
- Wins: 40
- Win by KO: 29
- Losses: 6
- Draws: 1
- No contests: 0
Medal record
Men's amateur boxing
Representing United States
World Amateur Championships
Silver medal – second place	1986 Reno	Super Heavyweight

Alex García (born December 2, 1961) is a retired Mexican-American boxer, who competed from 1987 to 2005 in the heavyweight division, best known for his short but nevertheless outstanding amateur career in 1986, and later to be a contender in the 1990s.

== Early years ==
García grew up in San Fernando, California. First, he was a pitcher and shortstop playing in kid leagues. Then, he was an all-league middle linebacker at San Fernando High School. Later he became a gang member, and eventually served five years in California state prisons at Soledad, San Quentin and Chino, for involuntary manslaughter after stabbing a rival gang member. Upon his release, he found himself training at the Jet Center, where he took up boxing. He was mentored under former middleweight William “Blinky” Rodriguez at the Benny's Jet Center martial arts and boxing complex in Van Nuys, California. "For two years, since he got out of prison, he's been working hard six days a week ... showing desire and discipline," Rodriguez said on his trainee. "He's got 200 street fights. If a guy goes after you with a bumper jack, you better be elusive," said Rodriguez.

== Amateur career ==
García rapidly began dispatching his foes at the amateurs. He won the Southern California Golden Gloves title and went on to win the National AAU Championships Super Heavyweight title in Beaumont in April 1986. "It was my best fight," said Garcia in the understatement of the tournament. Longtime amateur boxing people called Garcia's performance a surprise. William Pendleton of the U.S. Amateur Boxing Federation board of governors said of his performance at the nationals: "Here was a guy who came in totally from the cold and won the gold medal." He lost a close decision to Wesley Watson prior to the nationals, but avenged that defeat when he stopped Watson in two rounds to earn a spot on the U.S. team for the 1986 World Championships. He was training for the world championships in a parking garage converted into a boxing gym at the Sands Regency Hotel in Reno. at the world championships he defeated all his opponents on to his way to the finals, to losing the final to Teófilo Stevenson, winning the silver. Stevenson, a veteran of international boxing, age 35, with a 20-year-long career, won for the 301st time, knocking down Garcia, whose amateur record stood 17–2. "Winning by a knockout is just like a baseball player hitting a home run," said Stevenson after he knocked out García. "I want to fight him again. I want to redeem myself," said García after his defeat in the hands of Stevenson. García claimed he never lost in hundreds of street fights. "I always wanted to box, but I just never took the time to go into the gym and train; I was having too much fun on the streets," he said to the press. "There are some things you can't coach. He's got natural athletic ability. He's got durability, heart, power and he's come along real fast. When we went to the world championships, a lot of guys came up to me and asked me how many fights he'd really had. They couldn't believe he'd only fought 18 times and he was fighting for the gold medal in the world championships with that few fights," said his coach Rodriguez. García has been invited to work out at the U.S. Olympic Training Center. García also sparred with Mike Weaver, the former World Boxing Association heavyweight champion. García said he was a little wary when he first got into the ring against Weaver. Instead of boxing in the 1986 Goodwill Games, García chose to rest. He soon fought at the 1986 USA−USSR boxing duals, where he fought Vyacheslav Yakovlev (who also lost to Stevenson at Reno by majority decision,) in a match-up on July 26, and exhibition bout on August 2, losing him twice in a row, both time by unanimous decision. "I told myself I was going to become a fighter, going to stick with it. It was a big adjustment getting out (of prison). You get institutionalized, get out of the habits of normal life. Although I wanted to be a boxer, I never thought I'd come this far this fast," said García on his progress.

=== Highlights ===
(gold) Southern California Golden Gloves (+201 lbs), Los Angeles, California, 1986:

- (no data available)

Local match-up (+201 lbs), 1986:

- Lost to Wesley Watson by split decision, 2–3

(gold) National Championships (+201 lbs), Civic Center, Beaumont, Texas, April 1986:

- 1/2: Defeated Kimmuel Odum by unanimous decision, 5−0
- Finals: Defeated Wesley Watson by majority decision, 4−1 (Watson was given a standing eight count in the 3rd rd)

World Champ Box-offs (+201 lbs), Caesars Tahoe, Lake Tahoe, Nevada, April 1986:

- Finals (Qualified): Defeated Wesley Watson RSC 2 (2:41)

(silver) World Championships (+201 lbs), Sparks Convention Center, Reno, Nevada, May 1986:

- 1/8: Defeated Baik Hyun-man (South Korea) RSCH 2
- 1/4: Defeated Aziz Salihu (Yugoslavia) RSCH 2 (1:49)
- 1/2: Defeated Biaggio Chianese (Italy) RSCH 2 (referee Hong Chen Seng stopped the fight after giving three consecutive standing eight counts to Chianese; Italian corner protested; the bout was resumed and stopped again by the referee a minute later)
- Finals: Lost to Teófilo Stevenson (Cuba) RSCH 2 (1:06)

USA−USSR Middle & Heavy Duals (+201 lbs), ARCO Arena, Sacramento, California, July 1986:

- Lost to Vyacheslav Yakovlev (Soviet Union) by unanimous decision, 0−5

USA−USSR Exhibition (+201 lbs), Houston, Texas, August 1986:

- Lost to Vyacheslav Yakovlev (Soviet Union) by unanimous decision, 0−3

=== 1988 Olympics ===
He wasn't sure whether he would wait until after the 1988 Summer Olympics in Seoul, South Korea, because, once he wanted to turn pro immediately. This accounted for a brief hiatus, and finally, having 21 amateur fights under his belt, with a record of 17 wins (13 by knockout,) and 4 losses, García turned pro.

== Professional career ==
He started his pro career in California in 1987 and, apart from a cut stoppage loss against Dee Collier, dominated his opposition on his way to contention. Notable opponents at beaten by García at this stage of his career included Eddie Gonzalez, Rocky Sekorski, and Jerry Goff.

In 1992 he won the NABF title against Jerry Jones. After three successful defenses, and with a fight against Riddick Bowe in the advanced planning stage, he took a warm-up fight against Mike Dixon who KOd him by catching García with a blow to his temple. However, soon after in a rematch fight at the "Brady Theater" in Tulsa, OK in May 1994, Alex García won a unanimous decision against Mike Dixon. García never was a serious contender again, drawing with James Warring and getting KOd by Garing Lane.

In 1994 he lost his NABF title on points to fringe contender Joe Hipp, in 1995 he lost on points to Buster Mathis Jr.

== Professional boxing record ==
40 Wins (29 knockouts, 11 decisions), 6 Losses (4 knockouts, 2 decisions), 1 Draw
Result	Record	Opponent	Type	Round	Date	Location	Notes
Loss	40-6-1	(United States) Wallace McDaniel	KO	3	05/04/2005	(United States) Memphis, Tennessee, U.S.	
Win	40-5-1	(United States) Ron McCarthy	MD	8	07/12/1999	(United States) Yonkers, New York, U.S.	
Win	39-5-1	(United States) George Harris	TKO	1	07/08/1999	(United States) Camden, South Carolina, U.S.	
Win	38-5-1	(Mexico) Martin Lopez	TKO	2	29/08/1997	(United States) El Paso, Texas, U.S.	Referee stopped the bout at 1:05 of the second round.
Loss	37-5-1	(United States) Buster Mathis, Jr.	UD	12	18/04/1995	(United States) Las Vegas, Nevada, U.S.	IBF USBA Heavyweight Title.
Win	37-4-1	(United States) George Stephens	TKO	3	18/11/1994	(United States) Albuquerque, New Mexico, U.S.	
Win	36-4-1	(United States) Ed Donaldson	UD	10	01/09/1994	(United States) Albuquerque, New Mexico, U.S.	
Win	35-4-1	(United States) Mike Dixon	UD	10	24/05/1994	(United States) Tulsa, Oklahoma, U.S.	
Loss	34-4-1	(United States) Joe Hipp	UD	12	01/03/1994	(United States) Atlantic City, New Jersey, U.S.	NABF Heavyweight Title.
Win	34-3-1	(United States) George O'Mara	PTS	10	20/01/1994	(United States) Irvine, California, U.S.	
Win	33-3-1	(Jamaica) Everton Davis	PTS	10	18/12/1993	(United States) Las Vegas, Nevada, U.S.	
Loss	32-3-1	(United States) Garing Lane	TKO	2	20/08/1993	(United States) Fort Lauderdale, Florida, U.S.	Referee stopped the bout at 2:07 of the second round.
Draw	32-2-1	(United States) James Warring	SD	12	27/07/1993	(United States) Las Vegas, Nevada, U.S.	NABF Heavyweight Title.
Loss	32-2	(United States) Mike Dixon	TKO	2	08/06/1993	(United States) Las Vegas, Nevada, U.S.	WBC Continental Americas/WBA Fedelatin Heavyweight Titles. Referee stopped the bout at 2:45 of the second round.
Win	32-1	(United States) Eric Curry	TKO	12	20/04/1993	(United States) Las Vegas, Nevada, U.S.	NABF Heavyweight Title. Referee stopped the bout at 0:38 of the 12th round.
Win	31-1	(United States) West Turner	TKO	1	27/03/1993	(United States) Las Vegas, Nevada, U.S.	NABF Heavyweight Title.
Win	30-1	(United States) Mike Williams	TKO	5	16/02/1993	(United States) Denver, Colorado, U.S.	NABF Heavyweight Title. Referee stopped the bout at 2:14 of the fifth round.
Win	29-1	(United States) Jerry Jones	UD	12	08/12/1992	(United States) Tampa, Florida, U.S.	NABF/WBC Continental Americas Heavyweight Titles.
Win	28-1	(Puerto Rico) Ossie Ocasio	TKO	8	23/11/1992	(United States) Inglewood, California, U.S.	
Win	27-1	(United States) Matthew Brooks	TKO	2	27/10/1992	(United States) Houston, Texas, U.S.	Referee stopped the bout at 0:31 of the second round.
Win	26-1	(United States) Mike White	TKO	2	22/09/1992	(United States) El Paso, Texas, U.S.	
Win	25-1	(United States) Arthur Weathers	KO	2	10/08/1992	(United States) Inglewood, California, U.S.	
Win	24-1	(United States) Mike Ronay Evans	UD	10	02/07/1992	(United States) Reno, Nevada, U.S.	
Win	23-1	(United States) Mike Gans	KO	2	27/05/1992	(United States) San Diego, California, U.S.	
Win	22-1	(United States) Bobby Crabtree	KO	6	04/03/1992	(United States) Bakersfield, California, U.S.	
Win	21-1	(United States) Jerry Goff	TKO	2	11/07/1991	(United States) Gardnerville, Nevada, U.S.	
Win	20-1	(United States) Rocky Sekorski	KO	1	23/05/1991	(United States) Las Vegas, Nevada, U.S.	
Win	19-1	(Mexico) Ladislao Mijangos	TKO	3	22/03/1991	(United States) Lake Tahoe, Nevada, U.S.	
Win	18-1	(United States) Bernard Benton	TKO	2	09/10/1990	(United States) Phoenix, Arizona, U.S.	Referee stopped the bout at 0:52 of the second round.
Win	17-1	(United States) Bill Duncan	TKO	1	07/05/1990	(United States) Inglewood, California, U.S.	
Win	16-1	(United States) Dion Burgess	TKO	4	27/03/1990	(United States) Reseda, California, U.S.	
Win	15-1	(United States) Andre McCall	TKO	2	08/01/1990	(United States) Inglewood, California, U.S.	
Win	14-1	(United States) Jim Ashard	KO	4	13/11/1989	(United States) Inglewood, California, U.S.	
Win	13-1	(United States) Eddie Gonzales	UD	10	24/10/1989	(United States) Reseda, California, U.S.	
Win	12-1	(United States) Eddie Richardson	KO	7	29/08/1989	(United States) Reseda, California, U.S.	
Loss	11-1	(United States) Dee Collier	TKO	8	29/11/1988	(United States) Reseda, California, U.S.	
Win	11-0	(United States) Veti Katoa	KO	1	29/07/1988	(United States) Redondo Beach, California, U.S.	
Win	10–0	(United States) Jack S. Jackson	KO	2	23/06/1988	(United States) Los Angeles, California, U.S.	
Win	9–0	(United States) Rodney Stockton	KO	2	27/05/1988	(United States) Redondo Beach, California, U.S.	
Win	8–0	(United States) Dennis Fikes	KO	3	24/03/1988	(United States) Los Angeles, California, U.S.	
Win	7–0	(United States) Dave Slaughter	KO	2	12/11/1987	(United States) Los Angeles, California, U.S.	Slaughter knocked out at 1:15 of the second round.
Win	6–0	(United States) Dwain Bonds	UD	6	29/08/1987	(United States) Los Angeles, California, U.S.	
Win	5–0	(United States) Andre Smith	UD	5	09/07/1987	(United States) Los Angeles, California, U.S.	
Win	4–0	(United States) William Campudani	KO	1	18/06/1987	(United States) Los Angeles, California, U.S.	Campudani knocked out at 0:28 of the first round.
Win	3–0	(United States) Tony Crawford	KO	1	28/05/1987	(United States) Los Angeles, California, U.S.	Crawford knocked out at 1:57 of the first round.
Win	2–0	(United States) Richard Harrell	UD	4	24/02/1987	(United States) Reseda, California, U.S.	
Win	1–0	(United States) Cliff Melbourne	KO	1	06/02/1987	(United States) Reseda, California, U.S.	Melbourne knocked out at 2:52 of the first round.

Preceded by Wesley Watson	United States Amateur Super Heavyweight Champion; 1986	Succeeded by Carlton Hollis
