= List of U.S. national Golden Gloves super heavyweight champions =

This is a list of United States national Golden Gloves champions in the super heavyweight division, along with the state or region they represented. There was originally no weight limit for heavyweights until 1982, when the super heavyweight division was established and heavyweights were limited to 200 lb (91 kg). In 2000, the heavyweight limit was raised to 201 lb (91 kg), with super heavyweights competing above that.

- 1982: Warren Thompson – Washington, D.C.
- 1983: Craig Payne – Detroit, Michigan
- 1984: Mike Williams – Lafayette, Louisiana
- 1985: James Pritchard – Louisville, Kentucky
- 1986: Tevin George – Louisiana
- 1987: Nathaniel Fitch – Knoxville, Tennessee
- 1988: Kevin Ford – Fort Worth, Texas
- 1989: Larry Donald – Cincinnati, Ohio
- 1990: Larry Donald – Cincinnati, Ohio
- 1991: Samson Poʻuha – Rocky Mountain
- 1992: Alvin Manley – Mid-South
- 1993: Lance Whitaker – Southern California
- 1994: Derrick Jefferson – Detroit, Michigan
- 1995: Tom Martin – Florida
- 1996: Alvin Manley – Knoxville, Tennessee
- 1997: Dominick Guinn – Mid South
- 1998: Tuese Ahkiong – Hawaii
- 1999: Dominick Guinn – Mid-South
- 2000: Steve Vukosa – New England
- 2001: Lonnie Zaid – Detroit, Michigan
- 2002: Malcolm Tann – Florida
- 2003: Travis Walker – Florida
- 2004: Raphael Butler - Minnesota
- 2005: Gregory Corbin – Texas
- 2006: Felix Stewart – Tri-state/Ohio Valley
- 2007: Nathaniel James – Wisconsin
- 2007: Alexander Montagnet II - Louisiana
- 2008: Tor Hamer – New York metropolitan area
- 2009: Lenroy Thompson – Kansas City
- 2009: Anthony W Melberg - New Town, ND
- 2010: Roberto Morban – New York metropolitan area
- 2011: Lenroy Thompson – Kansas City
- 2012: Andrew Coleman – Cincinnati, Ohio
- 2013: Cam F. Awesome – Kansas City
- 2014: Jermaine Franklin – Michigan
- 2015: Darmani Rock – Philadelphia
- 2016: Anthony Hicks – New York
- 2017: Richard Torrez – California
- 2018: Roney Hines - Cleveland
- 2019: Antonio Mireles - Iowa
- 2021: Skylar Lacy - Indiana
- 2022: Eric Ross - Chicago
- 2023: Eric Ross - Chicago
