= Johnny du Plooy =

South African boxer

Personal information
- Nationality: South African
- Born: Johnny du Plooy; 27 September 1964 Gauteng, South Africa
- Died: 12 April 2013 (aged 48)
- Height: 6 ft 3 in (191 cm)
- Weight: Heavyweight

Boxing career

Boxing record
- Total fights: 33
- Wins: 27
- Win by KO: 22
- Losses: 5
- Draws: 1

Johnny du Plooy (27 September 1964 – 12 April 2013) was a South African former heavyweight boxer best known for his win over former World Boxing Association heavyweight world champion Mike Weaver. He challenged once for the WBO heavyweight world title in 1989.

== Boxing career ==
=== Amateur career ===
du Plooy had a very impressive amateur record of 196-4.

=== Professional career ===
The tall 6'3 South African boxer began his career in 1985 with 17 straight wins. He then lost to ex-champ Mike Weaver by 7th round KO. He later avenged this defeat by knocking out Mike Weaver in two rounds and in 1989 challenged Francesco Damiani for the vacant WBO heavyweight world title. Du Plooy was knocked out in the third round in the World Boxing Organization's inaugural heavyweight world title bout. After this, he fought 15 more fights, compiling an overall record of 27 wins, 5 losses, and 1 draw. All of du Plooy's losses were stoppages to known opponents such as Renaldo Snipes, Francesco Damiani, Pierre Coetzer, and Corrie Sanders. Du Plooy retired in 1993 after a win, and scored another comeback win in 1997 but promptly retired.

== Death ==
Du Plooy became overweight after his retirement. He suffered from heart problems in the few years leading up to his death. Several months before his death, he had a heart attack.

== Professional boxing record ==
27 Wins (22 knockouts, 5 decisions), 5 Losses (5 knockouts, 0 decisions), 1 Draw
Result	Record	Opponent	Type	Round	Date	Location	Notes
Win	--	Benjamin Manyube	TKO	2	15 June 1997	DLI Hall, Durban, KwaZulu-Natal, South Africa	
Win	8–5–1	(South Africa) Samson Mahlangu	TKO	6	26 June 1993	Superbowl, Sun City, Bophuthatswana	
Loss	10–0	(South Africa) Corrie Sanders	KO	1	27 July 1991	Superbowl, Sun City, Bophuthatswana	South Africa Heavyweight Title.
Win	30–6–2	(United States) Philipp Brown	UD	8	16 March 1991	Palazzo Dello Sport, Saint-Vincent, Aosta Valley, Italy	80–74, 80–74, 80–72.
Win	26–6	(United States) Tim Tomashek	TKO	5	8 November 1990	Biloxi, Mississippi, United States	
Loss	31–2	(South Africa) Pierre Coetzer	TKO	2	4 August 1990	Superbowl, Sun City, Bophuthatswana	
Win	27–2	(United States) Lee Roy Murphy	PTS	10	9 June 1990	Superbowl, Sun City, Bophuthatswana	
Loss	23–0	(Italy) Francesco Damiani	KO	3	6 May 1989	Syracuse, Sicily, Italy	WBO World Heavyweight Title.
Win	11–1–1	(United States) Mike Rouse	PTS	10	25 February 1989	Superbowl, Sun City, Bophuthatswana	
Win	17–5–1	(United States) Everett Martin	KO	7	18 December 1988	Orlando, Florida, United States	Martin knocked out at 1:59 of the seventh round.
Win	18–2–2	(United States) James Pritchard	TKO	10	22 October 1988	Superbowl, Sun City, Bophuthatswana	
Loss	30–7–1	(United States) Renaldo Snipes	TKO	7	12 August 1988	Eagles Club, Milwaukee, Wisconsin, United States	
Draw	18–2–1	(United States) James Pritchard	PTS	10	2 July 1988	Superbowl, Sun City, Bophuthatswana	
Win	31–13–1	(United States) Mike Weaver	KO	2	30 April 1988	Superbowl, Sun City, Bophuthatswana	
Win	21–5	(United States) James Broad	KO	4	27 February 1988	Portuguese Hall, Johannesburg, Transvaal, South Africa	
Loss	30–13–1	(United States) Mike Weaver	TKO	7	28 November 1987	Rand Stadium, Johannesburg, Transvaal, South Africa	
Win	20–5	(United States) Ricky Parkey	KO	10	31 October 1987	Superbowl, Sun City, Bophuthatswana	
Win	25–2	(South Africa) Bennie Knoetze	KO	1	12 September 1987	Kwa Thema Civic Centre, Springs, Transvaal, South Africa	
Win	11–6–2	(United States) Tyrone Booze	KO	2	27 July 1987	Ellis Park Indoor Arena, Johannesburg, Transvaal, South Africa	
Win	36–12–1	(United States) James Tillis	TKO	10	23 June 1987	Ellis Park Indoor Arena, Johannesburg, Transvaal, South Africa	
Win	15–5	(United States) David Bey	KO	9	27 April 1987	Ellis Park Indoor Arena, Johannesburg, Transvaal, South Africa	
Win	13–2–1	(United States) K.P. Porter	KO	6	7 February 1987	Superbowl, Sun City, Bophuthatswana	
Win	19–9	(United States) David Jaco	KO	2	22 November 1986	Rand Stadium, Johannesburg, Transvaal, South Africa	
Win	25–10	(United States) Steve Zouski	KO	4	30 October 1986	Hartford Civic Center, Hartford, Connecticut, United States	Zouski knocked out at 2:56 of the fourth round.
Win	28–6–1	(United States) Eddie Taylor	TKO	4	6 October 1986	Durban, Natal, South Africa	
Win	14–11	(United States) Mike Jameson	PTS	10	1 September 1986	West Ridge Park, Durban, Natal, South Africa	
Win	9–9–1	(United States) Stanley Ross	PTS	8	14 May 1986	Rand Stadium, Johannesburg, Transvaal, South Africa	
Win	14–4–1	(South Africa) Ron Ellis	TKO	2	2 April 1986	West Ridge Park, Durban, Natal, South Africa	
Win	9–0	(United States) Linus Willette	TKO	1	19 February 1986	Rand Stadium, Johannesburg, Transvaal, South Africa	
Win	7–5–3	(South Africa) Hannes van den Berg	KO	3	18 December 1985	Good Hope Centre, Cape Town, Cape Province, South Africa	
Win	2–1	(South Africa) Howard Mpepesi	TKO	5	7 September 1985	Ellis Park Stadium, Johannesburg, Transvaal, South Africa	
Win	4–2–1	(South Africa) Blessing Sibusiso Mbuyazi	TKO	1	10 July 1985	West Ridge Park, Durban, Natal, South Africa	
Win	1–5–2	(South Africa) Sophonia Naile	TKO	1	27 April 1985	Portuguese Hall, Johannesburg, Transvaal, South Africa	
