= Corrie Sanders =

South African boxer (1966–2012)

Personal information
- Nickname: The Sniper
- Nationality: South African
- Born: Cornelius Johannes Sanders; 7 January 1966 Brits, North West, South Africa
- Died: 23 September 2012 (aged 46) Pretoria, Gauteng, South Africa
- Height: 1.93 m (6 ft 4 in)
- Weight: Heavyweight

Boxing career
- Reach: 196 cm (77 in)
- Stance: Southpaw

Boxing record
- Total fights: 46
- Wins: 42
- Win by KO: 31
- Losses: 4

Cornelius Johannes Sanders (7 January 1966 – 23 September 2012) was a South African professional boxer who competed from 1989 to 2008. He won the WBO heavyweight title in 2003 after knocking out Wladimir Klitschko in two rounds, which was considered one of the biggest upsets in heavyweight boxing history; The Ring magazine named it the Upset of the Year. In 2004, having vacated the WBO title, Sanders faced Wladimir's brother Vitali Klitschko in an unsuccessful challenge for the vacant WBC and Ring heavyweight titles. He also held the WBU heavyweight title from 1997 until 2000 and the South Africa national heavyweight title in 1991.

Nicknamed "The Sniper", Sanders was a southpaw with a long reach, and was known for carrying formidable knockout power in his straight left hand. He died in a hospital in the early hours of 23 September 2012 after being shot during an armed robbery. Sanders also held wins against former cruiserweight champions Johnny Nelson, Carlos de Leon, Bobby Czyz, and Al Cole.

== Early life and amateur career ==
Sanders grew up in Brits, South Africa. He had two siblings and was of Afrikaner descent. In his youth, he played rugby, cricket, and golf. Having been introduced to boxing by his uncle, Sanders finished his amateur career in the late 1980s with 180 wins and 11 losses. He won the amateur South African heavyweight title four times from 1985-1988.

== Professional career ==
Sanders made his professional debut in 1989 with a first-round knockout of King Kong Dyubele on 2 April 1989. He went on to win his next 22 bouts, 14 by knockout. Among the fighters he defeated during that streak were Steve Zouski, Art Card, future WBO cruiserweight champion Johnny Nelson, and future world title challenger Bert Cooper. In his 24th bout, on 21 May 1994, Sanders suffered his first defeat, to Nate Tubbs via a second-round knockout.

He fought 12 more times over the next five years, including a first-round knockout over former world cruiserweight champion Carlos De León and a second-round knockout over another former world champion, Bobby Czyz. He lost by seventh-round stoppage in a slugfest fight with future unified and two-time world heavyweight champion Hasim Rahman. Sanders and Rahman both knocked each other down during the bout, and Sanders was ahead on the judges' scorecards prior to the stoppage. Rahman said of Sanders following their match: "I've never been hit that hard in my life." Returning to the ring in 2001, he scored a quick win over Michael Sprott and then followed this up with a defeat of Otis Tisdale in 2002. Corrie Sanders' biggest weapons were his southpaw fast hands that he used to knock fighters out early.

=== WBO heavyweight champion ===
Despite fighting three rounds in the last two years, the WBO sanctioned a challenge to their heavyweight champion Wladimir Klitschko. Sanders had accepted the bout on short notice and was a 40-1 underdog. On 8 March 2003, Sanders provided a stunning upset in Hanover, Germany, by dropping Klitschko four times to win the WBO belt by a second-round knockout. The Ring magazine named it the Upset of the Year for 2003. Klitschko later called Sanders the hardest puncher he ever faced in a December 2014 interview with The Ring, saying: "I’ve been in boxing for 25 years and I never fought anybody in this game that punched like Corrie Sanders."

=== WBC heavyweight title challenge ===
Sanders had initially sought a unification bout with WBA heavyweight champion Roy Jones Jr., who had also won his title in March 2003, and then with heavyweight contender David Tua. When those negotiations fell through, he was scheduled to defend the WBO title against Lamon Brewster on 18 October 2003. However, due to a conflict between WBO and Sanders's promoter, the bout did not take place. Sanders then vacated the WBO title to sign a contract to fight for the vacant WBC belt. The fight took place on 24 April 2004, against Wladimir's older brother, Vitali. Sanders was stopped by Vitali in the eighth round of the fight in the Staples Center in Los Angeles. After Sanders death, Vitali went on to pay his respects to Sanders and called this the hardest fight of his career.

Eight months later, Sanders knocked out Alexei Varakin in the second round of a contest in Soelden, Austria in December 2004. He briefly retired after that bout.

Sanders returned to action after two years in November 2006 to score a second round stoppage win over the Australian heavyweight champion Colin Wilson at the Convention Centre in Mafikeng. He had signed with Golden Gloves Promotions, and won another bout in South Africa against Brazilian Daniel Bispo in May 2007. His last bout, of the South African heavyweight title, was a loss to Osborne Machimana, a bout he took despite Sanders being injured beforehand. Sanders' final record was 42 wins (31 by knockout) and 4 losses.

== Personal life ==
Corrie Sanders and his wife Suzette had a son and a daughter.

== Death ==
On 22 September 2012, Sanders was fatally shot in an armed robbery at a restaurant called Thatch Haven in Brits, South Africa, where a function was being held for his nephew's 21st birthday. He had been near the entrance of the restaurant talking to his 15-year-old daughter Marinique and a cousin when three robbers entered firing their guns. Sanders had used his body to shield his daughter from oncoming bullets and then, while bleeding from bullet wounds in his right arm and stomach, pulled her to the ground and whispered for her to pretend to be dead. Sanders was taken to a hospital in Pretoria, where he died in the early hours of 23 September 2012 of his wounds.

On 27 September 2012, following a tip-off, North West police arrested three men in Oukasie near Brits, charging them with the murder of Sanders. All three were citizens of Zimbabwe. At one address, two suspects were apprehended and police recovered a cellular phone, a vehicle key, a purse and cash stolen during the robbery. Police then went to a second address, arrested a third suspect, and recovered a handbag also stolen in the robbery. The trial was postponed until August 2013 as investigators attempted to use a fourth suspect, now serving a 30-year sentence in Zimbabwe for killing a police officer, to locate the gun used in the crime.

On 11 February 2015 at a High Court in Pretoria, Judge Ferdi Preller sentenced Paida Fish, Chris Moyo and Samuel Mabena each to 43 years' imprisonment, of which they have to serve 30, on charges of murder, robbery with aggravating circumstances, and the unlawful possession of firearms and ammunition.

== Professional boxing record ==
46 fights	42 wins	4 losses
By knockout	31	4
By decision	11	0

No.	Result	Record	Opponent	Type	Round, time	Date	Location	Notes
46	Loss	42–4	Osborne Machimana	TKO	1 (12), 2:41	2 Feb 2008	Emperor's Palace, Kempton Park, South Africa	For South African heavyweight title
45	Win	42–3	Daniel Bispo	UD	10	12 May 2007	Emperor's Palace, Kempton Park, South Africa	
44	Win	41–3	Colin Wilson	TKO	2 (10)	24 Nov 2006	Convention Centre, Mafikeng, South Africa	
43	Win	40–3	Alexey Varakin	KO	2 (8), 1:59	14 Dec 2004	Schwarzl Freizeit Zentrum, Sölden, Austria	
42	Loss	39–3	Vitali Klitschko	TKO	8 (12), 2:46	24 Apr 2004	Staples Center, Los Angeles, California, US	For vacant WBC and The Ring heavyweight titles
41	Win	39–2	Wladimir Klitschko	TKO	2 (12), 0:27	8 Mar 2003	Preussag Arena, Hanover, Germany	Won WBO heavyweight title
40	Win	38–2	Otis Tisdale	TKO	2 (10), 1:40	9 Nov 2002	Coca-Cola Bricktown Events Center, Oklahoma City, Oklahoma, US	
39	Win	37–2	Michael Sprott	TKO	1 (8), 1:25	3 Nov 2001	Carnival City, Brakpan, South Africa	
38	Loss	36–2	Hasim Rahman	TKO	7 (12), 1:50	20 May 2000	Bally's Park Place, Atlantic City, New Jersey, US	Lost WBU heavyweight title
37	Win	36–1	Al Cole	TKO	1 (12), 1:13	19 Feb 2000	Carnival City, Brakpan, South Africa	Retained WBU heavyweight title
36	Win	35–1	Jorge Valdes	TKO	1 (12), 0:30	2 Jul 1999	Whitchurch Leisure Centre, Bristol, England	Retained WBU heavyweight title
35	Win	34–1	Bobby Czyz	TKO	2 (12), 1:43	12 Jun 1998	Mohegan Sun Arena, Montville, Connecticut, US	Retained WBU heavyweight title
34	Win	33–1	Ross Puritty	UD	12	15 Nov 1997	Carousel Casino, Hammanskraal, South Africa	Won vacant WBU heavyweight title
33	Win	32–1	Arthur Weathers	TKO	1 (10), 1:37	7 Feb 1997	Las Vegas Hilton, Winchester, Nevada, US	
32	Win	31–1	Olian Alexander	TKO	2 (10)	12 Sep 1996	Hilton, Huntington, New York, US	
31	Win	30–1	Sean Hart	TKO	2 (10), 1:18	20 Aug 1996	The Theater at Madison Square Garden, New York City, New York, US	
30	Win	29–1	Curtis Shepard	KO	1 (10), 1:12	20 Jul 1996	Morula Sun, Mabopane, South Africa	
29	Win	28–1	Keith Fletcher	KO	4 (10), 1:16	26 Jan 1996	Hilton Metropole Hotel, Brighton, England	
28	Win	27–1	James Pritchard	TKO	1 (10) 2:00	5 Aug 1995	Manuel Lujan Building, Albuquerque, New Mexico, US	
27	Win	26–1	Nikolay Kulpin	UD	10	1 Apr 1995	Superbowl, Sun City, South Africa	
26	Win	25–1	Garing Lane	PTS	8	24 Sep 1994	Wembley Arena, London, England	
25	Win	24–1	Carlos de León	TKO	1 (10), 0:49	13 Aug 1994	Convention Hall, Atlantic City, New Jersey, US	
24	Loss	23–1	Nate Tubbs	KO	2 (10), 1:26	21 May 1994	Carousel Casino, Hammanskraal, South Africa	
23	Win	23–0	Mike Williams	KO	1 (10), 2:58	19 Mar 1994	Carousel Casino, Hammanskraal, South Africa	
22	Win	22–0	Marshall Tillman	TKO	6 (10)	5 Feb 1994	The Aladdin, Paradise, Nevada, US	
21	Win	21–0	Levi Billups	KO	1 (10)	6 Nov 1993	Superbowl, Sun City, South Africa	
20	Win	20–0	George Stephens	TKO	1 (10)	4 Sep 1993	The Aladdin, Paradise, Nevada, US	
19	Win	19–0	Bert Cooper	TKO	3 (10), 1:26	6 Jun 1993	Resorts Casino Hotel, Atlantic City, New Jersey, US	
18	Win	18–0	Matthew Brooks	TKO	1 (10), 2:00	17 Apr 1993	ARCO Arena, Sacramento, California, US	
17	Win	17–0	Johnny Nelson	UD	10	24 Oct 1992	Morula Sun, Mabopane, South Africa	
16	Win	16–0	Mike Evans	UD	10	22 Aug 1992	Superbowl, Sun City, South Africa	
15	Win	15–0	Mike Dixon	PTS	8	9 May 1992	The Mirage, Paradise, Nevada, US	
14	Win	14–0	Anthony Wade	UD	10	22 Feb 1992	Superbowl, Sun City, South Africa	
13	Win	13–0	Art Card	TKO	1 (10)	23 Nov 1991	Superbowl, Sun City, South Africa	
12	Win	12–0	Mike Rouse	UD	10	28 Sep 1991	Superbowl, Sun City, South Africa	
11	Win	11–0	Johnny DuPlooy	KO	1 (12)	27 Jul 1991	Superbowl, Sun City, South Africa	Won vacant South African heavyweight title
10	Win	10–0	Steve Gee	TKO	4 (8), 1:05	6 Apr 1991	Dolphin Centre, Darlington, England	
9	Win	9–0	Steve Zouski	UD	8	8 Nov 1990	Biloxi, Mississippi, US	
8	Win	8–0	Moses Mthama	TKO	1 (6)	4 Aug 1990	Superbowl, Sun City, South Africa	
7	Win	7–0	Jorge Vilchis	KO	1 (8)	23 May 1990	First National Bank Arena, Durban, South Africa	
6	Win	6–0	Weaver Qwabe	TKO	1 (8)	29 Mar 1990	Portuguese Hall, Johannesburg, South Africa	
5	Win	5–0	Samson Mahlangu	TKO	3 (6), 2:20	9 Sept 1989	Morula Sun, Mabopane, South Africa	
4	Win	4–0	Gideon Hlongwa	TKO	3 (6), 2:15	5 Aug 1989	Superbowl, Sun City, South Africa	
3	Win	3–0	David Malatsi	TKO	1 (4)	27 May 1989	Superbowl, Sun City, South Africa	
2	Win	2–0	Prince Tukane	PTS	4	24 Apr 1989	Goodwood Showgrounds, Cape Town, South Africa	
1	Win	1–0	King Kong Dyubele	TKO	1 (4)	2 Apr 1989	Good Hope Centre, Cape Town, South Africa	

Sporting positions
Minor world boxing titles
Vacant Title last held by Pierre Coetzer	South African heavyweight champion 27 July 1991 – 1999; Vacated	Vacant Title next held by Jacob Mofokeng
Vacant Title last held by George Foreman	WBU heavyweight champion 11 November 1997 – 20 May 2000	Succeeded by Hasim Rahman
Major world boxing titles
Preceded by Wladimir Klitschko	WBO heavyweight champion 8 Mar 2003 – October 2003; Vacated	Vacant Title next held by Lamon Brewster
Awards
Previous: Juan Carlos Rubio; UD10 Francisco Bojado	The Ring Upset of the Year; TKO2 Wladimir Klitschko; 2003	Next: Glen Johnson; KO9 Roy Jones Jr.
Heavyweight status
Preceded by Greg Page	Latest born world champion to die 23 September 2012 – 1 September 2013	Succeeded by Tommy Morrison
