= Steve Zouski =

American professional heavyweight boxer (born 1954)

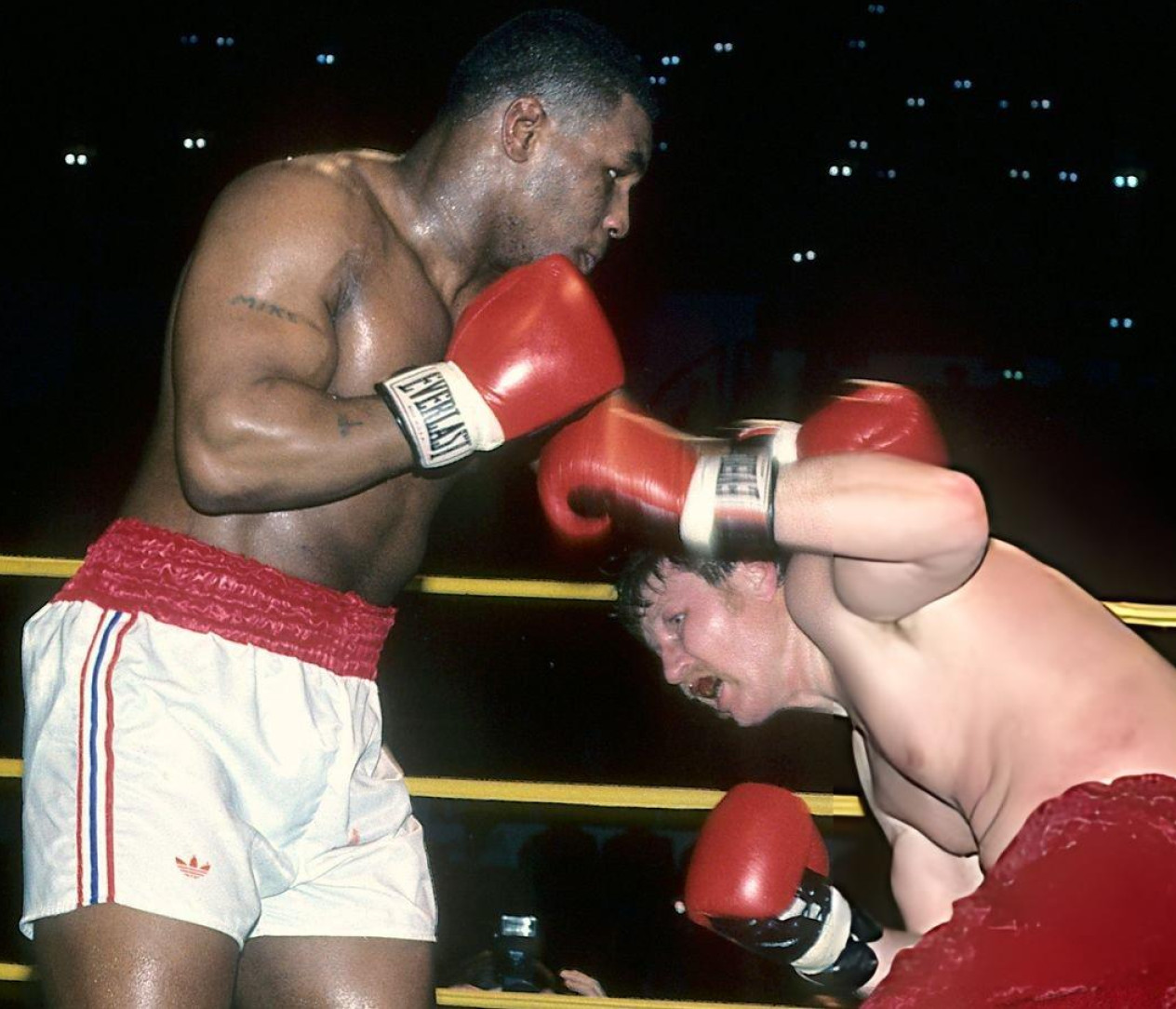
- Zouski during his fight against Mike Tyson

Personal information
- Nickname: Polish Power
- Born: August 14, 1954 (age 72) Wisconsin Rapids, Wisconsin, U.S.
- Height: 6 ft 0 in (183 cm)
- Weight: Heavyweight

Boxing career
- Reach: 74 in (188 cm)
- Stance: Orthodox

Boxing record
- Total fights: 49
- Wins: 31
- Win by KO: 15
- Losses: 18

Steve Zouski (born August 14, 1954) is an American former professional heavyweight boxer who competed from 1978 to 1991. Known for his toughness in the ring, he fought several prominent boxers, including Mike Tyson, George Foreman, and Tommy Morrison.

== Early life and amateur career ==
Born in Wisconsin Rapids, Wisconsin, Zouski graduated from Lincoln High School in 1972.

While still in high school, he trained at Gust Boxing Gym in Auburndale.

Stationed in Iwakuni, Japan, in January 1974, the 19-year-old Marines enlistee was two years into a four-year term. On October 17–18, he won the light heavyweight title and most valuable boxer honors at the Commander, Naval Forces Japan tournament.

After his military service, he pursued diesel mechanics at Mid-State Technical Institute. While continuing to box, he captured the 1978 North Central Wisconsin Golden Gloves title. He competed in the AAU Senior National Boxing Championships in Biloxi, Mississippi. Set to face Greg Page, the defending champion, he lost by medical disqualification.

Zouski established himself as a promising boxer during his amateur career, amassing a record of 27 wins and 5 losses before transitioning to professional boxing.

== Boxing career ==
Zouski, an orthodox fighter, made his pro debut in Boston in August 1978, fighting out of Brockton, Massachusetts. His early boxing career saw numerous bouts in the New England region. At the age of 26 and with a 15 (10 KOs)-1 record, Zouski took on undefeated Marvis Frazier (son of Joe Frazier) on May 11, 1981, at Madison Square Garden. During the fight, Zouski hit Frazier with two solid hooks and a right to the jaw in the first round, a hard straight right in the third, and a right uppercut and hook in the fourth. At 2:13 of the sixth round, following referee intervention, Zouski was stopped by the 20-year-old Frazier, who had his father Joe in his corner.

In 1983 in Chicago, Zouski notably fought all ten rounds with Lee Roy Murphy, who was 18-0 and became IBF Cruiserweight Champion shortly after.

In 1986, Zouski, who had 25 wins (14 KOs) - 9 losses, was scheduled for a ten-round bout with a 19 year old Mike Tyson at Nassau Coliseum in Uniondale, New York. Zouski weighed in at 210 pounds. Despite never being knocked down in previous fights, Zouski was defeated by knockout. At 2:49 of the third round on March 10, 1986, a series of uppercuts sent the 31 year old to the canvas. Tyson had sustained a cut on his ear earlier from a fall at a pigeon coop, and Zouski managed to hit the injured area a few times during the first two rounds. His punches caused Tyson's left ear to swell to three times its normal size after their fight. "Zouski is a game guy," said Tyson. "However, this was my worst performance ever. Mentally, I was not prepared."

Following his fight against Tyson, Zouski stepped into the ring with South African heavyweight Johnny du Plooy.

On March 3, 1987, Zouski faced a 267-pound George Foreman at the ARCO Arena in Sacramento, California, during Foreman's comeback after ten years out of the ring. Zouski was stopped by Foreman via a technical knockout at 2:47 of the fourth round.

After facing Mike Evans at the Las Vegas Hilton on August 1, 1987, Zouski fought José Ribalta later that November. He rematched Mike Evans in a ten-round bout in February 1988 at the Heights Banquet Hall in Chicago Heights. Zouski opened a cut on Evan's nose in the seventh round, while his left eye nearly closed by the end of the ninth. In the tenth round, a flurry knocked Zouski down for an eight-count, leading to his loss by decision. Evans commented afterward, "He (Zouski) is a tough fighter and he surprised me tonight." The following month, he went up against James Pritchard in Melrose Park, Illinois.

Zouski, at 34, took on undefeated Tommy Morrison in June 1989 at the Atlantic City Convention Center, suffering a knockdown in the fourth round and losing by unanimous decision. It was only the second time in his career that he had been knocked down.

On November 8, 1990, he lost a unanimous decision against South African fighter Corrie Sanders, who was 8–0, at the Mississippi Coast Coliseum in Biloxi, Mississippi.

His last fight was in 1991, ending his career with 33 wins and 18 losses as a professional.

== Boxing style ==
Zouski was known for his orthodox stance, toughness, and resilience inside the ring. Despite often entering fights as the underdog, he earned respect for his willingness to face elite opposition and his ability to withstand punishing attacks.

== Later life ==
After retiring from boxing, Zouski pursued a career as an engineer, working for over 20 years at the Wisconsin Department of Transportation. In 2006, he relocated to New Port Richey, Florida, to be closer to family, particularly to support one of his sons who is quadriplegic.

== Professional boxing record ==
Zouski has a record of 16 wins by decision and 15 wins by knock-out and 10 losses by decision and 8 by knockout.

49 fights	31 wins	18 losses
By knockout	15	8
By decision	16	10

No.	Result	Record	Opponent	Type	Round, time	Date	Location	Notes
49	Win	31–18	Jim Wisniewski	TKO	3 (6), 2:49	Apr 1991	Waukesha County Exposition Center, Waukesha, Wisconsin, U.S.	
48	Loss	31–17	Corrie Sanders	UD	8	Nov 1990	Mississippi Coast Coliseum, Biloxi, Mississippi, U.S.	
47	Win	31–16	Andre McCall	PTS	6	May 1990	Brown County Arena, Green Bay, Wisconsin, U.S.	
46	Win	31–16	Steve Mormino	UD	6	Apr 1990	Clarion Hotel Ballroom, St. Louis, Missouri, U.S.	
45	Loss	30–16	Tommy Morrison	UD	4	Jun 1989	Convention Center, Atlantic City, New Jersey, U.S.	
44	Win	29–16	Ricky Nelson	PTS	6	May 1989	VFW Post, Green Bay, Wisconsin, U.S.	
43	Win	28–16	Danny Blake	UD	6	Apr 1989	VFW Post, Green Bay, Wisconsin, U.S.	
42	Win	27–16	Mike Russell	UD	6	Feb 1989	Waukesha County Exposition Center, Waukesha, Wisconsin, U.S.	
41	Loss	26–16	James Pritchard	TKO	4	Mar 1988	Civic Center, Melrose Park, Illinois, U.S.	
40	Loss	26–15	Mike Evans	UD	10	Feb 1988	Banquet Hall, Chicago Heights, Illinois, U.S.	
39	Loss	26–14	José Ribalta	UD	10	Sep 1987	James L. Knight Center, Miami Beach, Florida, U.S.	
38	Loss	26–13	Mike Evans	UD	10	Aug 1987	Hilton Center, Las Vegas, Nevada, U.S.	
37	Loss	26–12	George Foreman	TKO	4	Mar 1987	Arco Arena, Sacramento, California, U.S.	
36	Loss	26–11	Johnny du Plooy	TKO	4	Oct 1986	Civic Center, Hartford, Connecticut, U.S.	
35	Loss	26–10	Mike Tyson	KO	3, 2:39	Mar 1986	Nassau Coliseum, Uniondale, New York, U.S.	
34	Win	26–9	Mark Lee	UD	10	Oct 1985	Community Center, Carson City, Nevada, U.S.	
33	Loss	25–9	Lee Canalito	RTD	7	Sep 1985	Sands Casino Hotel, Atlantic City, New Jersey, U.S.	
32	Loss	25–8	Bennie Knoetze	RTD	5	Mar 1984	Joekies Ice Rink, Welkom, South Africa	
31	Loss	25–7	Lee Roy Murphy	UD	10	Dec 1983	Americana Congress Hotel, Chicago, Illinois, U.S.	
30	Win	24–6	Bill Hollis	UD	10	Nov 11, 1983	Eagles Club, Milwaukee, Wisconsin, U.S.	
28	Loss	23–6	Mike Perkins	UD	6	Jun 1983	Madison Square Garden, New York City, New York, U.S.	
27	Loss	23–5	Scott Frank	UD	10	Jan 1983	Ice World, Totowa, New Jersey, U.S.	
26	Loss	23–4	Tony Tubbs	RTD	4	Sep 1982	Sands Casino Hotel, Atlantic City, New Jersey, U.S.	
25	Loss	23–3	Pat Cuillo	MD	10	Jun 1982	Tropicana Hotel & Casino, Atlantic City, New Jersey, U.S.	
24	Win	23–2	Johnny Warr	PTS	6	Apr 1982	Sands Casino Hotel, Atlantic City, New Jersey, U.S.	
23	Win	22–2	Barry Funches	PTS	6	Feb 1982	Catholic Youth Center, Scranton, Pennsylvania, U.S.	
22	Loss	21–2	Marvis Frazier	TKO	6	May 1981	Madison Square Garden, New York City, New York, U.S.	
21	Win	21–1	Tyrone Harlee	PTS	6	Mar 1981	Carrier Dome, Syracuse, New York, U.S.	
20	Win	20–1	Claman Parker	PTS	6	Feb 1981	Hotel Bradford, Boston, Massachusetts, U.S.	
19	Win	19–1	Henry Patterson	PTS	6	Dec 1980	Massasoit Community College Gym, Brockton, Massachusetts, U.S.	
18	Win	18–1	Johnny Warr	PTS	6	Nov 1980	Boston Garden, Boston, Massachusetts, U.S.	
17	Win	17–1	Rodell Dupree	PTS	6	Oct 1980	Boston Garden, Boston, Massachusetts, U.S.	
16	Win	16–1	Kid Samson	PTS	6	Sep 1980	Dorchester, Massachusetts, U.S.	
15	Win	15–1	Greg Sorrentino	PTS	6	Aug 1980	Boston Garden, Boston, Massachusetts, U.S.	
14	Win	14–1	Mike Boswell	PTS	6	Jun 1980	Boston Garden, Boston, Massachusetts, U.S.	
13	Win	13–1	Don Halpin	PTS	6	Apr 1980	Cumberland County Civic Center, Portland, Maine, U.S.	
12	Loss	12–1	Leroy Boone	PTS	6	Feb 1980	Catholic Youth Center, Scranton, Pennsylvania, U.S.	
11	Win	12–0	Bobby Jones	PTS	6	Sep 1979	Roseland Ballroom, Taunton, Massachusetts, U.S.	
10	Win	11–0	Jose Verdejo	PTS	6	Aug 1979	Lowell Auditorium, Lowell, Massachusetts, U.S.	
9	Win	10–0	Johnny Blaine	PTS	6	May 1979	Cumberland County Civic Center, Portland, Maine, U.S.	
8	Win	9–0	Johnny Blaine	PTS	6	Mar 1979	Civic Center, Providence, Rhode Island, U.S.	
7	Win	8–0	Joe Maye	PTS	6	Feb 1979	Boston Garden, Boston, Massachusetts, U.S.	
6	Win	7–0	Joe Maye	PTS	6	Jan 1979	Freeport Hall, Dorchester, Massachusetts, U.S.	
5	Win	6–0	Johnny Blaine	PTS	6	Dec 1978	Arena, North Providence, Rhode Island, U.S.	
4	Win	5–0	Tom Landry	PTS	6	Nov 1978	Boston Garden, Boston, Massachusetts, U.S.	
3	Win	4–0	Johnny Blaine	PTS	6	Oct 1978	Coliseum, New Haven, Connecticut, U.S.	
2	Win	3–0	Wayne Briscoe	PTS	6	Sep 1978	Arena, North Providence, Rhode Island, U.S.	
1	Win	2–0	Sam Miller	PTS	6	Sep 1978	Civic Center, Providence, Rhode Island, U.S.	
0	Win	1–0	Joe Maye	PTS	6	Aug 1978	Sheraton Hotel, Boston, Massachusetts, U.S.	
