= Wladimir Klitschko vs. Corrie Sanders =

Boxing Match

The Next Big Thing
- Date: 8 March 2003
- Venue: Preussag Arena, Hannover, Germany
- Title(s) on the line: WBO Heavyweight Championship

Tale of the tape
Boxer	(Ukraine) Wladimir Klitschko	(South Africa) Corrie Sanders
Nickname	"Dr. Steelhammer"	"The Sniper"
Hometown	Kyiv, Kyiv Oblast, Ukraine	Pretoria, Gauteng, South Africa
Pre-fight record	40–1 (37 KO)	38–2 (28 KO)
Age	26 years, 11 months	37 years, 2 months
Height	6 ft 6 in (198 cm)	6 ft 4 in (193 cm)
Weight	242 1/2 lb (110 kg)	225 lb (102 kg)
Style	Orthodox	Southpaw
Recognition	WBO; Heavyweight Champion	WBO; No. 11 Ranked Heavyweight

Result
- Sanders defeated Klitschko via 2nd round KO

Wladimir Klitschko vs. Corrie Sanders, billed as The Next Big Thing was a professional boxing match contested on 8 March 2003 for the WBO Heavyweight Championship.

== Background ==
Since beating Chris Byrd to win the WBO belt, Wladimir Klitschko had made five successful defences, all of which ended before the final round, and was ranked as the No.1 heavyweight contender by The Ring (WBC champion Lennox Lewis was the magazine's champion). After failing to reach agreements with Kirk Johnson, Fres Oquendo, Lou Savarese and Danny Williams, Universum Box Promotion ultimately signed a 4-fight contract with Corrie Sanders, who was ranked No.9 contender by the WBO at the time. According to the agreement, Sanders's first fight was going to be for the WBO world heavyweight title. Since a knockout loss to Hasim Rahman in May 2000, Sanders had only fought in a total of three rounds in the intervening two years and nine months.

== The fight ==
With thirty seconds left in the opening round, Wladimir threw a jab that Sanders countered with a big left hook, prompting Klitschko to enter a clinch. While in the clinch, Sanders landed another left hook that sent Klitschko to the canvas. Klitschko got up but was dropped again almost immediately. The following round, Sanders continued his assault on a visibly hurt Klitschko, dropping him twice more at the beginning of the round. The referee waived it off after the fourth knockdown.

== Aftermath ==
In December 2003 Sanders vacated the WBO belt after refusing to fight the organization's No.1 contender Lamon Brewster. The following year he faced Klitschko's brother Vitali for the WBC championship, which was left vacant after the retirement of Lennox Lewis. Vitali stopped Sanders in the 8th round. Sanders had four fights before retiring with a loss in 2008.

Wladimir had two more quick knockout victories before facing Lamon Brewster for the vacant WBO belt, however he was once again upset by the underdog.

== Undercard ==
Confirmed bouts:

== Broadcasting ==
Country	Broadcaster
Germany	ZDF
Hungary	RTL Klub
United Kingdom	Sky Sports
United States	HBO

Preceded by vs. Jameel McCline	Wladimir Klitschko' bouts 8 March 2003	Succeeded by vs. Fabio Eduardo Moli
Preceded by vs. Otis Tisdale	Corrie Sanders's bouts 8 March 2003	Succeeded by vs. Vitali Klitschko
Awards
Preceded by Juan Carlos Rubio vs. Francisco Bojado	The Ring Upset of the Year; 2003	Succeeded by Glen Johnson vs. Roy Jones Jr.
