= Craig Payne =

American boxer

Personal information
- Born: Craig Payne; May 22, 1961 Chillicothe, Ohio, U.S.
- Died: April 7, 2017 (aged 55)
- Height: 6 ft 2 in (188 cm)
- Weight: Heavyweight

Boxing career
- Stance: Orthodox

Boxing record
- Total fights: 33
- Wins: 11
- Win by KO: 8
- Losses: 20
- Draws: 2
Medal record
Men's amateur boxing
Representing United States
World Cup
Silver medal – second place	1983 Rome	Super heavyweight
North American Championships
Gold medal – first place	1983 Houston	Super heavyweight

Craig Payne (May 22, 1961 – April 7, 2017) was an American professional boxer who competed from 1985 to 2001. He challenged once for the IBO heavyweight title in 1992. As an amateur, he won the National Golden Gloves super heavyweight title in 1983.

== Amateur career ==
Payne was a standout football player at Chillicothe (Ohio) High School, graduating in 1979. He moved to Livonia, Michigan, in July of that year and began boxing in order to lose weight. Payne won a gold medal at the 1982 National Sports Festival, followed by the National Golden Gloves title in 1983 after decisioning a young Mike Tyson.

Payne upset three-time Olympic champion Teófilo Stevenson en route to a gold medal at the 1983 North American Championships in Houston, Texas. At the Boxing World Cup held in Italy the following month, he took home the silver medal after losing to Francesco Damiani in the final.

== Professional career ==
Payne made his professional debut in 1985, defeating Cleveland Ingram via second-round knockout in Detroit. However, he didn't compete for six years before returning in 1991, well past his prime. Payne's pro career was quite surprising largely because he was completely out of shape often coming in at 300 lbs. His most notable success was a KO of previously undefeated Samson Po'uha.

== Professional boxing record ==
11 Wins (8 knockouts, 3 decisions), 20 Losses (7 knockouts, 13 decisions), 2 Draws Archived August 29, 2012, at the Wayback Machine
Result	Record	Opponent	Type	Round	Date	Location	Notes
Loss	11-20-2	Andre Purlette	TKO	2	10/02/2001	Miami, Florida, U.S.	
Loss	11-19-2	Anthony Curry	UD	6	05/02/2000	Rochester, Washington, U.S.	
Loss	11-18-2	Richard Mason	UD	6	22/10/1999	Rising Sun, Indiana, U.S.	
Loss	11-17-2	Fres Oquendo	TKO	3	10/07/1999	Elgin, Illinois, U.S.	
Loss	11-16-2	Troy Weida	TKO	5	10/06/1999	Indianapolis, Indiana, U.S.	
Loss	11-15-2	Tim Puller	UD	8	01/05/1999	Rochester, Washington, U.S.	
Loss	11-14-2	Iran Barkley	MD	8	27/07/1996	Rochester, Washington, U.S.	
Loss	11-13-2	James Tillis	UD	8	21/06/1996	Vancouver, Washington, U.S.	
Loss	11-12-2	Daniel Dăncuță	KO	6	07/03/1995	Prior Lake, Minnesota, U.S.	
Loss	11-11-2	Joe Thomas	PTS	4	17/02/1995	Atlantic City, New Jersey, U.S.	
Loss	11-10-2	Shannon Briggs	UD	8	13/01/1995	Atlantic City, New Jersey, U.S.	
Loss	11-9-2	Ray Anis	TKO	10	01/10/1994	Boston, Massachusetts, U.S.	
Win	11-8-2	Samson Po'uha	TKO	6	30/06/1994	Mesquite, Nevada, U.S.	
Loss	10-8-2	Mike Hunter	PTS	10	19/05/1994	North Las Vegas, Nevada, U.S.	
Loss	10-7-2	John Bray	PTS	8	06/05/1994	Terre Haute, Indiana, U.S.	
Loss	10-6-2	Darren Hayden	PTS	6	09/03/1994	Lexington, Kentucky, U.S.	
Loss	10-5-2	Francois Botha	KO	7	30/10/1993	Johannesburg, South Africa	
Loss	10-4-2	Garing Lane	PTS	10	28/09/1993	Bay Saint Louis, Mississippi, U.S.	
Win	10-3-2	Rocky Sekorski	TKO	6	14/09/1993	Atlantic City, New Jersey, U.S.	
Win	9-3-2	Melton Bowen	TKO	5	28/08/1993	Orlando, Florida, U.S.	
Win	8-3-2	Bobby Crabtree	TKO	6	29/05/1993	Yakima, Washington, U.S.	
Win	7-3-2	Tyrone Evans	PTS	6	27/04/1993	Auburn Hills, Michigan, U.S.	
Loss	6-3-2	Lionel Butler	TKO	7	26/03/1993	Reseda, California, U.S.	
Loss	6-2-2	Pinklon Thomas	SD	12	14/11/1992	Greenville, South Carolina, U.S.	For inaugural IBO heavyweight title
Win	6-1-2	Arthel Lawhorne	TKO	2	27/10/1992	Auburn Hills, Michigan, U.S.	
Win	5-1-2	Conroy Nelson	KO	6	19/06/1992	London, Ontario, Canada	
Loss	4-1-2	Tyrone Evans	MD	4	21/04/1992	Auburn Hills, Michigan, U.S.	
Draw	4-0-2	Kevin P Porter	PTS	4	08/02/1992	Lansing, Michigan, U.S.	
Win	4-0-1	Luis Torres	PTS	4	21/01/1992	Canton, Michigan, U.S.	
Draw	3-0-1	Robert Smith	PTS	4	09/12/1991	Waukesha, Wisconsin, U.S.	
Win	3-0	Ken McCants	KO	3	14/11/1991	Auburn Hills, Michigan, U.S.	
Win	2-0	Kevin P Porter	PTS	4	16/07/1991	Lansing, Michigan, U.S.	
Win	1-0	Cleveland Ingram	KO	2	21/03/1985	Detroit, Michigan, U.S.	
