= Alvin Manley =

American boxer

Alvin Vincent Manley (born 24 June 1971 in Widener, Arkansas) is an American boxer who was an amateur standout but has had limited success as a professional.

Manley was a two-time National Golden Gloves Super Heavyweight Champion (1992, 1996).

Manley turned pro in 1997 and won his first two fights that year, and did not fight again until 2002. Since 2002, he has fought fringe heavyweight fighters, and has 11 wins, one loss, and two draws.
