= Warren Thompson (boxer) =

American boxer

Personal information
- Born: August 26, 1956 (age 70) Baltimore, Maryland

Boxing career
Medal record
Men's amateur boxing
Representing United States
North American Championships
Silver medal – second place	1982 Las Vegas	Super Heavyweight

Warren Thompson (born August 26, 1956) is an American former professional boxer best known for his successful amateur boxing career.

== Amateur career ==
- 1983 National AAU Super Heavyweight Champion

== Professional career ==
Nicknamed "Chico", Thompson turned pro in 1985 and was upset by also debuting Mike Hunter. His pro career never picked up from there, and his resume included losses to notable heavyweights James Pritchard, Bruce Seldon, and Henry Akinwande. He retired in 1996 with a record of 5 wins and 10 losses.

== Honors ==
Thompson was a Class of 2006 Inductee into the Maryland Boxing Hall of Fame.

== Professional boxing record ==
5 Wins (1 knockout, 4 decisions), 10 Losses (2 knockouts, 8 decisions)
Result	Opp Record	Opponent	Type	Round	Date	Location	Notes
Win	5-9	(United States) Mike Whitfield	UD	6	20 Nov 1996	(United States) Woodlawn, Maryland, U.S.	
Loss	7-2-2	(United States) Sam Hampton	TKO	6	6 Jun 1995	(United States) Glen Burnie, Maryland, U.S.	
Loss	6-0	(United States) Thomas "Top Dawg" Williams	UD	6	4 Nov 1993	(United States) Glen Burnie, Maryland, U.S.	
Loss	8-0	(United States) Derek Isaman	UD	4	20 Jun 1991	(United States) Atlantic City, New Jersey, U.S.	
Loss	12-1	(United Kingdom) Adam Fogerty	PTS	8	24 Sep 1990	(United Kingdom) London, England	
Loss	4-0	(United Kingdom) Henry Akinwande	PTS	6	14 Mar 1990	(United Kingdom) London, England	
Win	8-7-1	(United States) Robert Colay	UD	6	13 Feb 1990	(United States) Pikesville, Maryland, U.S.	
Loss	4-0	(United States) Bruce Seldon	TKO	3	25 Jun 1989	(United States) Atlantic City, New Jersey, U.S.	
Loss	2-2-1	(United States) Garing Lane	SD	4	7 Dec 1988	(United States) Glen Burnie, Maryland, U.S.	
Win	3-0	(United States) Tommy Smith	PTS	4	26 Aug 1988	(United States) Bealeton, Virginia, U.S.	
Loss	-2-1	(United States) Garing Lane	SD	4	20 Jul 1988	(United States) Glen Burnie, Maryland, U.S.	
Loss	9-0	(United States) James Pritchard	PTS	6	31 Oct 1986	(United States) Atlantic City, New Jersey, U.S.	
Win	5-1	(United States) Kelvin Beatty	TKO	4	19 Jun 1986	(United States) Washington, D.C., U.S.	
Win	3-9	(United States) Lynwood Jones	PTS	4	28 Apr 1986	(United States) Fort Belvoir, Virginia, U.S.	
Loss	--	(United States) Mike Hunter	SD	4	14 Dec 1985	(United States) Largo, Maryland, U.S.	

Preceded by Tyrell Biggs	United States Amateur Super Heavyweight Champion; 1983	Succeeded by Nathaniel Fitch
