= James Pritchard (boxer) =

American boxer (born 1961)

James Pritchard (born April 28, 1961, in Louisville, Kentucky) is an American former professional boxer who competed from 1985 to 1997. He challenged once for the IBF cruiserweight title in 1991.

== Amateur ==
Pritchard had a stellar amateur career, becoming the 1985 National Golden Gloves Super Heavyweight Champion.

== Professional career ==
Pritchard turned pro in 1985 and went undefeated in 17 bouts, including a draw with Mike 'The Bounty' Hunter, before facing ex-world heavyweight champion Mike Weaver in a crossroads fight. Pritchard was stopped by the big punching Weaver on his feet in six, but returned to win three fights in a row before meeting another former world champion, this time Michael Dokes. Pritchard was stopped in seven, but gained a reputation for toughness as Dokes, like Weaver, could not drop Pritchard.

Pritchard travelled to apartheid South Africa for several fights, boxing to a controversial draw with Johnny DuPlooy when he had apparently got the better of DuPlooy. He was stopped in 10 in a rematch, then stopped in eight by DuPlooy's rival Pierre Coetzer. Pritchard returned to the States where he was a chief sparring partner of Frank Bruno prior to his Tyson fight. He also put together a string of wins including a KO of novice Lionel Butler. A trip to England to face world-ranked Gary Mason resulted in a 9th-round stoppage loss, although yet again Pritchard gained respect for his durability – no one could knock him down.

=== World title fight ===
Having been relegated to opponent status in the heavyweights, the 26–5–2 Pritchard moved down to the Cruiserweight division. He beat two-time world title challenger Siza Makathini in his debut winning an IBF Intercontinental title, but in his 1991 fight with James Warring for the vacant IBF cruiserweight title he was dropped for the first time in his career and stopped in 36 seconds, a record for a world title fight.

=== Journeyman ===
Pritchard returned to the heavyweights after his cruiserweight title disaster, but was relegated to journeyman status. He knocked out undefeated West Turner to win the USBA heavyweight title, but lost to the likes of Tim Witherspoon, Orlin Norris, Michael Moorer and Herbie Hide.

By the mid to late 1990s he was an aged heavyweight and not much more than cannon fodder for Corrie Sanders, Brian Nielsen and Wladimir Klitschko. He retired in 1997 with a respectable record of 30–18–2 (25 KOs).

== Professional boxing record ==
30 Wins (25 knockouts, 5 decisions), 18 Losses (12 knockouts, 6 decisions), 2 Draws
Result	Record	Opponent	Type	Round	Date	Location	Notes
Loss	30–18–2	(United States) Darroll Wilson	TKO	2	29/11/1997	Vineland, New Jersey, U.S.	
Loss	30–17–2	(Ukraine) Wladimir Klitschko	TKO	3	20/09/1997	Aachen, Germany	
Loss	30–16–2	(United States) Damon Reed	UD	10	11/08/1997	Kansas City, Missouri, U.S.	
Loss	30–15–2	(Denmark) Brian Nielsen (boxer)	KO	3	13/06/1997	Slagelse, Denmark	
Win	30–14–2	(United States) Greg Suttington	TKO	4	13/05/1996	Kansas City, Missouri, U.S.	Referee stopped the bout at 2:14 of the fourth round.
Loss	29–14–2	(South Africa) Corrie Sanders	TKO	1	05/08/1995	Albuquerque, New Mexico, U.S.	
Loss	29–13–2	(United States) Brian Morgan	SD	8	20/03/1995	Louisville, Kentucky, U.S.	
Win	29–12–2	(United States) Ralph Jackson	TKO	3	13/02/1995	Louisville, Kentucky, U.S.	
Loss	28–12–2	(Croatia) Zeljko Mavrovic	UD	10	18/06/1994	Chicago, Illinois, U.S.	
Loss	28–11–2	(United States) Kenny Keene	PTS	10	05/12/1993	Caldwell, Idaho, U.S.	
Loss	28–10–2	(United States) Michael Moorer	TKO	3	22/06/1993	Atlantic City, New Jersey, U.S.	
Loss	28–9–2	(United Kingdom) Herbie Hide	TKO	2	12/12/1992	(United Kingdom) London, England	
Win	28–8–2	(United States) West Turner	TKO	3	10/07/1992	Ringgold Township, Pennsylvania, U.S.	USBA Heavyweight Title.
Loss	27–8–2	(United States) Tim Witherspoon	UD	10	23/03/1992	Atlantic City, New Jersey, U.S.	
Loss	27–7–2	(United States) Orlin Norris	PTS	8	13/12/1991	Bercy, France	
Loss	27–6–2	(United States) James Warring	KO	1	07/09/1991	Salemi, Italy	IBF Cruiserweight Title. Pritchard knocked out at 0:36 of the first round.
Win	27–5–2	(South Africa) Siza Makathini	DQ	6	06/04/1991	(United Kingdom) Darlington, England	IBF Intercontinental Cruiserweight Title. Makathini disqualified for low blows.
Loss	26–5–2	(United Kingdom) Gary Mason (boxer)	TKO	9	12/12/1990	(United Kingdom) London, England	Referee stopped the bout at 2:09 of the ninth round.
Win	26–4–2	(United States) Rick Enis	TKO	8	28/07/1990	Saint Petersburg, Florida, U.S.	
Win	25–4–2	(United States) Lorenzo Boyd	KO	4	01/06/1990	Biloxi, Mississippi, U.S.	
Win	24–4–2	(Mexico) Ladislao Mijangos	TKO	6	08/05/1990	Lexington, Kentucky, U.S.	
Win	23–4–2	(United States) Lee Moore	TKO	2	02/03/1990	Jackson, Mississippi, U.S.	
Win	22–4–2	(United States) Lionel Butler	TKO	6	09/12/1989	Biloxi, Mississippi, U.S.	
Win	21–4–2	(United States) Rodney Bolden	KO	1	26/08/1989	Murray, Kentucky, U.S.	
Win	20–4–2	(United States) Larry Givens	TKO	2	25/05/1989	Louisville, Kentucky, U.S.	
Win	19–4–2	(United States) Mike Russell	KO	5	25/04/1989	Louisville, Kentucky, U.S.	
Loss	18–4–2	(South Africa) Pierre Coetzer	TKO	8	18/03/1989	Johannesburg, South Africa	
Loss	18–3–2	(South Africa) Johnny DuPlooy	TKO	10	22/10/1988	Sun City, Bophuthatswana	
Draw	18–2–2	(South Africa) Johnny DuPlooy	PTS	10	02/07/1988	Sun City, Bophuthatswana	
Loss	18–2–1	(United States) Michael Dokes	TKO	7	28/04/1988	(New York (state)) New York City, U.S.	WBC Continental Americas Heavyweight Title.
Win	18–1–1	(United States) Steve Zouski	TKO	4	25/03/1988	Melrose Park, Illinois, U.S.	Referee stopped the bout at 1:28 of the fourth round.
Win	17–1–1	(United States) Mike Cohen	KO	3	21/02/1988	Frankfort, Kentucky, U.S.	Cohen knocked out at 2:28 of the third round.
Win	16–1–1	(United States) Bruce Johnson	KO	5	05/01/1988	Lexington, Kentucky, U.S.	Johnson knocked out at 2:09 of the fifth round.
Loss	15–1–1	(United States) Mike Weaver (boxer)	TKO	6	24/08/1987	Louisville, Kentucky, U.S.	Referee stopped the bout at 2:30 of the sixth round.
Win	15–0–1	(United States) Frankie Hines	KO	2	28/07/1987	Lexington, Kentucky, U.S.	Hines knocked out at 2:08 of the second round.
Win	14–0–1	(United States) Kevin Casimier	TKO	7	20/04/1987	Lexington, Kentucky, U.S.	
Win	13–0–1	(United States) Darryl Peppers	TKO	2	17/03/1987	Lexington, Kentucky, U.S.	Referee stopped the bout at 2:20 of the second round.
Win	12–0–1	(United States) Larry Phelps	TKO	2	24/02/1987	Lexington, Kentucky, U.S.	Referee stopped the bout at 2:09 of the second round.
Draw	11–0–1	(United States) Mike Hunter (boxer)	PTS	6	20/02/1987	Atlantic City, New Jersey, U.S.	
Win	11–0	(United States) Bobby Crabtree	TKO	2	25/11/1986	Louisville, Kentucky, U.S.	
Win	10–0	(United States) Warren Thompson (boxer)	PTS	6	31/10/1986	Atlantic City, New Jersey, U.S.	
Win	9–0	(United States) Michael Johnson	KO	1	03/10/1986	Louisville, Kentucky, U.S.	
Win	8–0	(United States) Robert Evans	PTS	6	28/08/1986	(New York (state)) New York City, U.S.	
Win	7–0	(United States) Melvin Epps	UD	6	29/07/1986	Lexington, Kentucky, U.S.	
Win	6–0	Louis Brooks	TKO	1	10/07/1986	Houston, Texas, U.S.	
Win	5–0	(United States) Tim Miller	KO	2	24/06/1986	Lexington, Kentucky, U.S.	
Win	4–0	(United States) John Morton	TKO	1	25/04/1986	Louisville, Kentucky, U.S.	
Win	3–0	(United States) Allen Hudson	KO	4	22/03/1986	Las Vegas, Nevada, U.S.	Hudson knocked out at 1:03 of the fourth round.
Win	2–0	(United States) Jack Jackson	UD	4	Jan 17, 1986	(Georgia (U.S. state)) Atlanta, Georgia, U.S.	
Win	1–0	(United States) Vince Parker	KO	2	21/09/1985	Las Vegas, Nevada, U.S.	
