= Vitali Klitschko vs. Corrie Sanders =

Boxing match

Let the Next Era Begin
- Date: 24 April 2004
- Venue: Staples Center, Los Angeles, California, US
- Title(s) on the line: WBC and The Ring heavyweight titles

Tale of the tape
Boxer	(Ukraine) Vitali Klitschko	(South Africa) Corrie Sanders
Nickname	"Dr. Ironfist"	"The Sniper"
Hometown	Kyiv, Kyiv Oblast, Ukraine	Pretoria, Gauteng, SA
Purse		$952,500
Pre-fight record	33–2 (32 KO)	39–2 (29 KO)
Age	32 years, 9 months	38 years, 3 months
Height	6 ft 7 in (201 cm)	6 ft 4 in (193 cm)
Weight	245 lb (111 kg)	235 lb (107 kg)
Style	Orthodox	Southpaw
Recognition	WBC/The Ring; No. 1 Ranked Heavyweight	WBC; No. 2 Ranked Heavyweight; The Ring; No. 3 Ranked Heavyweight

Result
- Klitschko defeated Sanders via 8th round TKO

Vitali Klitschko vs. Corrie Sanders, billed as Let the Next Era Begin, was a professional boxing match contested on 24 April 2004 for the WBC Heavyweight Championship.

== Background ==
After his TKO loss to Lennox Lewis in June 2003 Vitali Klitschko first sought an immediate rematch, however after some initial interest Lewis ultimately declined, deciding not to fight for the rest of 2003. As a result, Klitschko faced Kirk Johnson in a WBC Heavyweight Title Eliminator stopping him in 2 rounds making him Lewis's mandatory contender.

In January 2004, Lewis announced his retirement from boxing leaving the WBC belt vacant.

Corrie Sanders caused the Upset of the Year in 2003 when he knocked out Vitali's younger brother Klitschko to win the WBO belt. After vacating the belt he agreed to face Vitali for the now vacant WBC title.

Going into the fight, Vitali Klitschko was ranked as the number one Heavyweight in the world by Ring magazine, with Corrie Sanders at third.

== The fight ==
In the first round, Klitschko established his jab and distance on Sanders, who was looking to mount a left hand on the head for the first two minutes. With less than a minute to go, Sanders landed a left cross on Vitali's chin, in which the latter was staggered momentarily by the punch and was backing off to avoid contact. With less than ten seconds in the round, Klitschko momentarily went down after getting to a hold with Sanders, eventually losing balance and was ruled a slip by referee Jon Schorle.

After a dominant second round won by Vitali, Sanders would attempt to take the third by landing a series of big lefts on Klitschko, in which he responded back by landing straight rights and lefts on Sanders who is open for the counter shots. By the fifth, Klitschko was in complete control of the fight with Sanders beginning to show signs of fatigue, landing many unanswered right hands that hurt his opponent at times, including a last second barrage in which he nearly knocked Sanders down, resulting in a two-point round for Klitschko. Despite an early scare in the sixth round from Sanders after taking a left hand to the head, Vitali continued to punish his opponent back and forth and slipping away from Sanders' retaliation, easily winning the round.

By the eighth round, Sanders was bleeding and looking worn out. He managed a last flurry which briefly troubled Klitschko before a straight right halted the attack. Referee Schorle stepped in towards the end of round after Sanders took a string of 20 unanswered punches, giving Klitschko a TKO victory and becoming a two-time heavyweight champion.

According to CompuBox, Klitschko landed 230 punches in 413 attempts with 56% accuracy, against Sanders's 51 of 229 punches overall with 22% accuracy. There were no knockdowns recorded in the bout, as Sanders was stopped on his feet.

== Aftermath ==
Sanders was taken to a hospital for a hematoma of his left ear however his manager, Vernon Smith, said "He's all right; he's cracking jokes. He took quite a shot behind the left ear. He was exhausted, he was tired. He did not disagree with the referee's decision. He got beaten by a better fighter."

Klitschko praised Sanders durability saying "I was surprised he never went down. He took so many punches it was unbelievable."

After Sanders' death in 2012 Vitali praised him to Bild Plus saying “Corrie Sanders was the most difficult opponent I ever fought. Corrie was fast, could give and take a punch. His style was dangerous and did not suit me. I was very pleased to be able to win this fight.”

== Undercard ==
Confirmed bouts:

Winner	Loser	Weight division/title belt(s) disputed	Result
(United States) José Navarro	(Mexico) Martin Armenta	Bantamweight (8 rounds)	5th-round TKO.
(Mexico) Carlos Bojorquez	(United States) Ronald Weaver	Middleweight (8 rounds)	4th-round KO.
(Lebanon) Ahmad Kaddour	(Mexico) Juan Carlos Garcia	Middleweight (8 rounds)	4th-round RTD
(United States) Sumya Anani	(United States) Lisa Holewyne	Welterweight (6 rounds)	Unanimous decision.
(Ukraine) Taras Bidenko	(Mexico) Agustin Corpus	Heavyweight (6 rounds)	Unanimous decision.
(Mexico) Efren Hinojosa	(Mexico) Jose Luis Montes	Welterweight (4 rounds)	Unanimous decision.

== Broadcasting ==
Country	Broadcaster
Australia	Main Event
Canada	Viewers Choice
Germany	ZDF
Hungary	RTL Klub
United States	HBO

Preceded by vs. Kirk Johnson	Vitali Klitschko' bouts 24 April 2004	Succeeded by vs. Danny Williams
Preceded by vs. Wladimir Klitschko	Corrie Sanders's bouts 24 April 2004	Succeeded by vs. Alexey Varakin
