= Mike Hunter (boxer) =

American boxer

Personal information
- Nickname: The Bounty Hunter
- Nationality: American
- Born: September 14, 1959
- Died: February 8, 2006 (aged 46)
- Weight: Cruiserweight; Heavyweight

Boxing career
- Stance: Orthodox

Boxing record
- Total fights: 36
- Wins: 26
- Win by KO: 8
- Losses: 7
- Draws: 2
- No contests: 1

Mike Hunter (September 14, 1959 – February 8, 2006) was an American professional boxer who won the USBA Heavyweight title and the International Boxing Federation Continental Americas Cruiserweight title.

== Professional career ==
Known as "The Bounty Hunter", Hunter was a heavyweight boxer during the early-to-mid 1990s. Hunter's boxing career began in Maryland, after a seven-year stint in prison for armed robbery. Hunter's skills caught the attention of actor James Caan, who would manage Hunter for three years, before selling his contract to Bill Slayton. Hunter first became ranked by the major sanctioning bodies in 1990, and would defeat many notable boxers like Dwight Qawi, Pinklon Thomas, Tyrell Biggs, Oliver McCall, Jimmy Thunder, and Alexander Zolkin. By the mid-1990s, Hunter had a drug addiction.

Hunter lost three fights in the last year and a half of his career, before retiring following a loss to Danish Heavyweight Brian Nielsen for the IBO version of the heavyweight title.

== Professional boxing record ==
26 Wins (8 knockouts, 18 decisions), 7 Losses (1 knockout, 6 decisions), 2 Draws, 1 No Contest Archived December 28, 2014, at the Wayback Machine
Result	Record	Opponent	Type	Round	Date	Location	Notes
Loss	26–7–2 (1)	(Denmark) Brian Nielsen	TKO	5	31/05/1996	Copenhagen, Denmark	IBO Heavyweight Title.
Win	26–6–2 (1)	(United States) Arthur Weathers	PTS	10	03/11/1995	(United States) Las Vegas, Nevada, U.S.	
Loss	25–6–2 (1)	(United States) Marion Wilson	SD	10	06/10/1995	(United States) Atlantic City, New Jersey, U.S.	
Win	25–5–2 (1)	(United States) Will Hinton	PTS	10	06/05/1995	(United States) Las Vegas, Nevada, U.S.	
Loss	24–5–2 (1)	(Cuba) Aurelio Perez	UD	10	24/03/1995	São Paulo, Brazil	
Loss	24–4–2 (1)	(Russia) Alexander Zolkin	SD	10	16/12/1994	(United States) Chester, West Virginia, U.S.	
Win	24–3–2 (1)	(United States) Keith McMurray	SD	10	01/09/1994	(United States) Albuquerque, New Mexico, U.S.	
Win	23–3–2 (1)	(United States) Craig Payne	PTS	10	19/05/1994	(United States) Las Vegas, Nevada, U.S.	
NC	22–3–2 (1)	(United States) Buster Mathis Jr.	NC	12	04/12/1993	(United States) Corpus Christi, Texas, U.S.	Retained USBA Heavyweight Title MD for Hunter overturned due to positive drug tests.
Win	22–3–2	(United States) Cecil Coffee	UD	10	06/11/1993	Sun City, South Africa	
Win	21–3–2	(Russia) Alexander Zolkin	SD	12	05/08/1993	(United States) Las Vegas, Nevada, U.S.	Retained USBA Heavyweight Title
Win	20–3–2	(United States) Tyrell Biggs	UD	12	17/01/1993	(United States) Las Vegas, Nevada, U.S.	Won USBA Heavyweight Title
Loss	19–3–2	(South Africa) Francois Botha	MD	8	22/09/1992	(United States) El Paso, Texas, U.S.	
Win	19–2–2	(United States) David Jaco	TKO	3	14/02/1992	(United States) Las Vegas, Nevada, U.S.	
Win	18–2–2	(Puerto Rico) Ossie Ocasio	UD	10	14/12/1990	Sydney, Australia	
Win	17–2–2	(Uruguay) Jose Maria Flores Burlon	TKO	1	31/10/1990	Melbourne, Australia	
Win	16–2–2	(New Zealand) Jimmy Thunder	KO	4	14/08/1990	Melbourne, Australia	
Win	15–2–2	(United States) Pinklon Thomas	UD	10	12/06/1990	(United States) Fort Bragg, North Carolina, U.S.	
Win	14–2–2	(United States) Dwight Muhammad Qawi	UD	12	16/03/1990	(United States) Newark, New Jersey, U.S.	WBC Continental Americas Cruiserweight Title.
Win	13–2–2	(United States) Donald Coats	KO	3	31/01/1989	(United States) Irvine, California, U.S.	
Win	12–2–2	(Canada) Wade Parsons	UD	8	06/12/1988	Halifax, Nova Scotia, Canada	
Win	11–2–2	(United States) Dino Homsey	KO	4	26/07/1988	(Canada) Los Angeles, California, U.S.	
Win	10–2–2	(United States) Oliver McCall	UD	10	22/01/1988	(United States) Atlantic City, New Jersey, U.S.	
Loss	9–2–2	(United States) Andre Smith	UD	8	05/11/1987	(United States) Los Angeles, California, U.S.	
Win	9–1–2	(United States) Rodney Stockton	TKO	1	29/09/1987	(United States) Los Angeles, California, U.S.	
Win	8–1–2	(United States) Gary Lightbourne	KO	1	25/08/1987	(United States) Los Angeles, California, U.S.	
Loss	7–1–2	(United States) Levi Billups	SD	8	18/05/1987	(United States) Inglewood, California, U.S.	
Win	7–0–2	(United States) Mike Gans	UD	8	28/04/1987	(United States) Los Angeles, California, U.S.	
Draw	6–0–2	(United States) James Pritchard	PTS	6	20/02/1987	(United States) Atlantic City, New Jersey, U.S.	
Win	6–0–1	(United States) Kelvin Beatty	UD	6	02/01/1987	(United States) Atlantic City, New Jersey, U.S.	
Win	5–0–1	(United States) Ken Crosby	TKO	5	02/10/1986	(United States) Atlantic City, New Jersey, U.S.	
Draw	4–0–1	(United States) Woody Clark	PTS	6	23/08/1986	(United States) Fayetteville, North Carolina, U.S.	
Win	4–0	(United States) Avery Rawls	UD	8	11/04/1986	(United States) Las Vegas, Nevada, U.S.	
Win	3–0	(United States) Dominic Parker	UD	6	02/03/1986	(United States) Lancaster, Pennsylvania, U.S.	
Win	2–0	(United States) Donald Vance	PTS	4	18/01/1986	(United States) Staunton, Virginia, U.S.	
Win	1–0	(United States) Warren Thompson	SD	4	14/12/1985	(United States) Largo, Maryland, U.S.	

== Career after boxing ==
Hunter returned to the sport in September 2005, working as an instructor and trainer at the Tru Boxing Gym in Hollywood.

== Death ==
On February 8, 2006, Hunter was on the roof of the St. Moritz Hotel in Los Angeles, when he encountered two Los Angeles police officers, who had set up a buy/bust sting operation surveillance. The officers reported that Hunter, who was unprovoked, hit an officer on the head with a gun. The other officer tackled Hunter, with the previous officer eventually joining in the struggle. Hunter broke free, and pointed his gun at the officers, who promptly shot him twice, in the chest and the arm. Hunter was taken to Cedars-Sinai Hospital, where he died. The two officers involved stated that they did not feel that Hunter was aware that they were police officers.

== Personal life ==
His son Michael Hunter, Jr. became US amateur champ in 2007.
