= Pierre Coetzer =

South African boxer (born 1961)

Personal information
- Nationality: South African
- Born: 6 December 1961 (age 64) Pretoria, Gauteng, South Africa
- Height: 6 ft 4 in (1.93 m)
- Weight: Heavyweight

Boxing career
- Stance: Orthodox

Boxing record
- Total fights: 44
- Wins: 39
- Win by KO: 27
- Losses: 5
- Draws: 0
- No contests: 0

Pierre Coetzer (born 6 December 1961) is a former heavyweight boxer from Pretoria, South Africa. Coetzer's most notable fights include those against Johnny du Plooy, Riddick Bowe, Frank Bruno, and George Foreman.

== Professional career ==
Coetzer began his professional boxing career in 1983. After winning his first nine fights, he was matched up against American cruiserweight Bernard Benton. In their July 1984 ten-round bout in Durban, Benton won on points. In September 1984, he fought Benny Knoetze for the vacant South African Heavyweight Title, and knocked him out in the third round, after being dropped twice in round two.

Over the next three years, Coetzer notched a dozen victories; including wins against Larry Frazier, Eddie "Young Joe Louis" Taylor, and Alfredo Evangelista. He also won his rematch bout with Bernard Benton on 28 September 1987, when he knocked him out in the first round. He then faced Puerto Rican Ossie Ocasio, who had won the WBA Cruiserweight Championship, and who had defeated boxers such as Jimmy Young, Dwight Muhammad Qawi, and Robbie Williams. On 6 March 1988, they had their first match at the Good Hope Centre in Cape Town. Ocasio won the ten-round bout on points, which gave Coetzer his first loss since the South African Heavyweight Title. However, after defeating Tim Anderson (U.S.) and Manoel De Almeida (Brazil), Coetzer faced Ocasio in a rematch at the Standard Bank Indoor Arena, and won the ten-round bout on points.

After six more wins, Coetzer faced local heavyweight Johnny du Plooy, who had won 196 of his 200 amateur fights, and who had scored 17 knockouts in his first 20 professional fights. They met on 4 August 1990 at the Sun City Superbowl, in a bout billed "Once and For All". Du Plooy cut Coetzer with his first right punch, and had him down towards the end of the first round, but Coetzer dropped Du Plooy twice in the second round and won the fight by TKO.

Coetzer went on to earn a number-one contender spot for Evander Holyfield's IBF world title, but was made to fight a WBA Heavyweight Title Eliminator, scheduled for 12 rounds, against the number-two contender, Riddick Bowe. The bout took place on 18 July 1992 in Las Vegas, Nevada. During the fight, Bowe was ahead in scoring, although Coetzer disagreed. In the sixth round, Bowe hit Coetzer below the belt, for which the referee Mills Lane had deducted a point. In the seventh round, Bowe hit Coetzer with what appeared to be a right-handed low blow. Coetzer turned away, and anticipated that Lane would warn Bowe, however, he left his hands down, and Bowe delivered a jolting right uppercut. Bowe then followed with a left and right that drove Coetzer into the ropes, which caused Lane to step in and end the match with a TKO. "It definitely shouldn't have been stopped," said Coetzer. "It was a low blow."

Coetzer fought Frank Bruno from London, England. The referee stopped the fight in the eighth round and Bruno was awarded a TKO. His final career bout was against George Foreman; he was knocked down briefly in the fourth round, but eventually lost by TKO when he was knocked down again in the eighth.

== Professional boxing record ==
39 Wins (27 knockouts, 12 decisions), 5 Losses (3 knockouts, 2 decisions)
Result	Record	Opponent	Type	Round	Date	Location	Notes
Loss	39–5	(United States) George Foreman	TKO	8	1993-01-16	Reno-Sparks Convention Center, Reno, Nevada, U.S.	Referee stopped the bout at 1:48 of the eighth round.
Loss	39–4	(United Kingdom) Frank Bruno	TKO	8	1992-10-17	(United Kingdom) The Arena, London, England	Referee stopped the bout at 2:17 into the eighth round.
Loss	39–3	(United States) Riddick Bowe	TKO	7	1992-07-18	Mirage Hotel & Casino, Las Vegas, Nevada, U.S.	Referee stopped the bout at 2:59 of the seventh round.
Win	39–2	(United States) Carlton West	TKO	1	1992-05-16	(United States) Hugo's Nightclub, Bealton, Virginia, U.S.	
Win	38–2	(United States) Dan Murphy	TKO	3	1991-10-19	(United States) Williamson, WV, Williamson Field House,	
Win	37–2	(United States) Jerry Halstead	PTS	10	1991-07-27	Superbowl, Sun City, Bophuthatswana	
Win	36–2	(Cuba) José Ribalta	PTS	10	1991-05-11	(United States) Biloxi, Mississippi, U.S.	
Win	35–2	(Canada) Ken Lakusta	TKO	2	1990-12-16	(United Kingdom) The Pavilion, Thornaby, England	
Win	34–2	(United States) Kimmuel Odum	TKO	10	1990-12-15	Palazzo del Ghiaccio, Marino, Lazio, Italy	
Win	33–2	(United States) J.B. Williamson	PTS	10	1990-11-08	(United States) Biloxi, Mississippi, U.S.	
Win	32–2	(South Africa) Johnny du Plooy	TKO	2	1990-08-04	Superbowl, Sun City, Bophuthatswana	
Win	31–2	(United States) Philipp Brown	TKO	9	1990-06-09	Superbowl, Sun City, Bophuthatswana	
Win	30–2	(United States) Everett Martin	UD	10	1990-05-05	(United States) Green Bay, Wisconsin, U.S.	
Win	29–2	(United States) Bobby Hitz	KO	1	1989-09-09	Coliseo Roberto Clemente, San Juan, Puerto Rico, U.S.	Hitz knocked out at 2:59 of the first round.
Win	28–2	(United States) Michael Greer	KO	6	1989-05-29	Standard Bank Arena, Johannesburg, South Africa	
Win	27–2	(United States) James Pritchard	TKO	8	1989-03-18	Standard Bank Arena, Johannesburg, South Africa	
Win	26–2	(United States) Mike White	TKO	8	1989-02-11	Standard Bank Arena, Johannesburg, South Africa	
Win	25–2	(Puerto Rico) Ossie Ocasio	PTS	10	1988-11-26	Standard Bank Arena, Johannesburg, South Africa	
Win	24–2	(Brazil) Manoel De Almeida	TKO	4	1988-09-28	Standard Bank Arena, Johannesburg, South Africa	
Win	23–2	(United States) Tim Anderson	KO	2	1988-08-15	West Ridge Park Tennis Stadium, Durban, South Africa	
Loss	22–2	(Puerto Rico) Ossie Ocasio	PTS	10	1988-03-06	Good Hope Centre, Cape Town, South Africa	
Win	22–1	(United States) Bernard Benton	KO	1	1987-09-28	Standard Bank Arena, Johannesburg, South Africa	
Win	21–1	(Uruguay) Alfredo Evangelista	PTS	10	1987-08-30	Ellis Park Tennis Stadium, Johannesburg, South Africa	
Win	20–1	(United Kingdom) Chris Jacobs	KO	2	1987-03-08	Portuguese Hall, Johannesburg, South Africa	
Win	19–1	(Panama) Luis Lozano	KO	1	1986-09-27	Superbowl, Sun City, Bophuthatswana	
Win	18–1	(United States) Kevin P Porter	TKO	6	1986-05-14	Rand Stadium, Johannesburg, South Africa	
Win	17–1	(United States) Tommy Franco Thomas	TKO	2	1986-04-02	West Ridge Park Tennis Stadium, Durban, South Africa	
Win	16–1	(United States) Eddie Taylor	TKO	9	1986-02-19	Rand Stadium, Johannesburg, South Africa	
Win	15–1	(United States) Larry Frazier	PTS	10	1985-09-30	Rand Stadium, Johannesburg, South Africa	
Win	14–1	(United States) Dion Simpson	TKO	8	1985-09-07	Ellis Park Rugby Stadium, Johannesburg, South Africa	
Win	13–1	(United States) David Jaco	KO	6	1985-07-08	Portuguese Hall, Johannesburg, South Africa	
Win	12–1	(United States) Rocky Sekorski	PTS	10	1985-05-13	Portuguese Hall, Johannesburg, South Africa	
Win	11–1	(United States) Mark Lee	PTS	10	1985-03-25	West Ridge Park Tennis Stadium, Durban, South Africa	
Win	10–1	(South Africa) Bennie Knoetze	KO	3	1984-09-22	Ellis Park Tennis Stadium, Johannesburg, South Africa	South African Heavyweight Title.
Loss	9–1	(United States) Bernard Benton	PTS	10	1984-07-16	West Ridge Park Tennis Stadium, Durban, South Africa	
Win	9–0	(United States) Leroy Caldwell	PTS	8	1984-05-21	Portuguese Hall, Johannesburg, South Africa	
Win	8–0	(Spain) Felipe Rodriguez	TKO	2	1984-03-31	Ellis Park Tennis Stadium, Johannesburg, South Africa	
Win	7–0	(United States) Billy Joe Thomas	TKO	5	1984-01-28	Ellis Park Tennis Stadium, Johannesburg, South Africa	
Win	6–0	(United Kingdom) Steve Gee	PTS	8	1983-09-03	Wembley Sports Pavilion, Johannesburg, South Africa	
Win	5–0	(South Africa) Ron Ellis	KO	4	1983-07-04	West Ridge Park Tennis Stadium, Durban, South Africa	
Win	4–0	(South Africa) Louis Hendricks	TKO	5	1983-06-11	Wembley Sports Pavilion, Johannesburg, South Africa	
Win	3–0	(South Africa) Jerry Shezi	PTS	6	1983-04-23	Wembley Sports Pavilion, Johannesburg, South Africa	
Win	2–0	(South Africa) Caiphus Masondo	KO	2	1983-03-14	West Ridge Park Tennis Stadium, Durban, South Africa	
Win	1–0	(South Africa) Isaac Ndlamlenze	TKO	1	1983-02-05	Ellis Park Tennis Stadium, Johannesburg, South Africa	
