= List of United States national amateur boxing super heavyweight champions =

Below is a list of National Amateur Boxing Super Heavyweight (AAU) Champions, also known as United States Amateur Champions, along with the state or region which they represented. The United States National Boxing Championships bestow the title of United States Amateur Champion on amateur boxers for winning the annual national amateur boxing tournament organized by USA Boxing, the national governing body for Olympic boxing and is the United States member organization of the International Amateur Boxing Association (AIBA). It is one of four premier amateur boxing tournaments, the other being the National Golden Gloves Tournament, which crowns its own amateur super heavyweight champion, the Police Athletic League Tournament, and the United States Armed Forces Tournament, all sending champions to the US Olympic Trials. The Super Heavyweight division is contested at a weight class of 201+ pounds.

== List of U.S. national Golden Gloves super heavyweight champions (201+ lb / +91 kg) ==
The super heavyweight division was established in 1982, with heavyweights limited to 200 lb (91 kg) until 2000, when the heavyweight limit was raised to 201 lb. Below is the list of champions, along with the state or region they represented. The 2020 tournament was cancelled due to COVID-19.

Year	Champion	State/Region
1982	Warren Thompson	Washington, D.C.
1983	Craig Payne	Detroit, Michigan
1984	Mike Williams	Lafayette, Louisiana
1985	James Pritchard	Louisville, Kentucky
1986	Tevin George	Louisiana
1987	Nathaniel Fitch	Knoxville, Tennessee
1988	Kevin Ford	Fort Worth, Texas
1989	Larry Donald	Cincinnati, Ohio
1990	Larry Donald	Cincinnati, Ohio
1991	Samson Poʻuha	Rocky Mountain
1992	Alvin Manley	Mid-South
1993	Lance Whitaker	Southern California
1994	Derrick Jefferson	Detroit, Michigan
1995	Tom Martin	Florida
1996	Alvin Manley	Knoxville, Tennessee
1997	Dominick Guinn	Mid-South
1998	Tuese Ahkiong	Hawaii
1999	Dominick Guinn	Mid-South
2000	Steve Vukosa	New England
2001	Lonnie Zaid	Detroit, Michigan
2002	Malcolm Tann	Florida
2003	Travis Walker	Florida
2004	Raphael Butler	Minnesota
2005	Gregory Corbin	Texas
2006	Felix Stewart	Tri-State/Ohio Valley
2007	Nathaniel James	Wisconsin
2007	Alexander Montagnet II	Louisiana
2008	Tor Hamer	New York Metropolitan Area
2009	Lenroy Thompson	Kansas City
2009	Anthony W. Melberg	New Town, North Dakota
2010	Roberto Morban	New York Metropolitan Area
2011	Lenroy Thompson	Kansas City
2012	Andrew Coleman	Cincinnati, Ohio
2013	Cam F. Awesome	Kansas City
2014	Jermaine Franklin	Michigan
2015	Darmani Rock	Philadelphia
2016	Anthony Hicks	New York
2017	Richard Torrez	California
2018	Roney Hines	Cleveland
2019	Antonio Mireles	Iowa
2020	No tournament	COVID-19 cancellation
2021	Skylar Lacy	Indiana
2022	Eric Ross	Chicago
2023	Eric Ross	Chicago
2024	Gilbert Kabamba	New England
2025	Darius Fulghum	url=https://www.usaboxing.org/2025-national-golden-gloves-results |title=2025 National Golden Gloves Results |publisher=USA
