= List of U.S. national Golden Gloves bantamweight champions =

This is a list of United States national Golden Gloves champions in the bantamweight division, along with the state or region they represented. The weight limit for bantamweights was first contested at 118 lb (54 kg), but was increased to 119 lb (54 kg) in 1967.

- 1928 – Joe Bozak – Chicago
- 1929 – Harry Garbell – Chicago
- 1930 – Paul Dazzo – Chicago
- 1931 – Nick Scialaba – Chicago
- 1932 – Leo Rodak – Chicago
- 1933 – John Ginter – Chicago
- 1934 – Troy Bellini – Cleveland
- 1935 – Johnny Brown – Chicago
- 1936 – Johnny Brown – Chicago
- 1937 – Frank Kainrath – Chicago
- 1938 – Frank Kainrath – Chicago
- 1939 – Chester Ellis – Kansas City
- 1940 – Dick Menchaca – Fort Worth
- 1941 – Dick Menchaca – Fort Worth
- 1942 – Jack Graves – Minneapolis
- 1943 – Earl O'Neal – Oklahoma City
- 1944 – Clayton Johnson – Sioux City
- 1945 – Bob Jarvis – Kansas City
- 1946 – Eddie Dames – St. Louis
- 1947 – Robert Bell – Cleveland
- 1948 – Melvin Barber – Des Moines
- 1949 – Jack McCann – Oklahoma City
- 1950 – Albert Crus – Los Angeles
- 1951 – Nate Brooks – Cleveland
- 1952 – James Hairston – Kansas City
- 1953 – Dick Martinez – Nashville
- 1954 – Alfred Escobar – Los Angeles
- 1955 – Donald Eddington – St. Louis
- 1956 – Vince Doniero – Toledo
- 1957 – Tommy Reynolds – Kansas City
- 1958 – Gilbert Higginbotham – Lafayette
- 1959 – Pat Moore – Kenosha
- 1960 – Petros Spanakos – Hollywood
- 1961 – Oscar German – Grand Rapids
- 1962 – James Moon – Cleveland
- 1963 – Emanuel Steward – Detroit
- 1964 – Manual Navarro – Fort Worth
- 1965 – Mel Miller – Billings
- 1966 – John North – Cincinnati
- 1967 – Earl Large – Roswell
- 1968 – Earl Large – Roswell
- 1969 – Oliver James – Kansas City
- 1970 – Dave Kibby – San Francisco
- 1971 – Johnny Moreno – Fort Worth
- 1972 – Ray Theragood – New Mexico
- 1973 – James Martinez – Fort Worth
- 1974 – Dan Hermosillo – Rocky Mountain
- 1975 – Miguel Ayala – Fort Worth
- 1976 – Barnard Taylor – Knoxville
- 1977 – Wayne Lynumn – Chicago
- 1978 – Jackie Beard – Knoxville
- 1979 – Ken Baysmore – Washington, DC
- 1980 – Myron Taylor – Pennsylvania
- 1981 – Steve Cruz, Jr. – Fort Worth
- 1982 – Meldrick Taylor – Pennsylvania
- 1983 – Jesse Benavidez – Fort Worth
- 1984 – Robert Shannon – Las Vegas
- 1985 – Eugene Speed – Washington, DC
- 1986 – Fernando Rodriguez – Pennsylvania
- 1987 – Fernando Rodriguez – Pennsylvania
- 1988 – Sergio Reyes – Fort Worth
- 1989 – John West – Knoxville
- 1990 – Sandtanner Lewis – Florida
- 1991 – Aristead Clayton, Jr. – Louisiana
- 1992 – Chris Hamilton – Texas
- 1993 – Terrance Churchwell – Knoxville
- 1994 – Errid Caldera – Cleveland
- 1995 – Jorge Munoz – Texas
- 1996 – Baldo Ramirez – Denver, Colorado
- 1997 – Evaristo Rodriguez – Chicago
- 1998 – Alfredo Torres – Texas
- 1999 – Calvin Stewart (boxer)Atlanta, GA
- 2000 – Jose Aguiniga – California
- 2001 – Rasheem Jefferson – Pennsylvania
- 2002 – Rashiem Jefferson – Pennsylvania
- 2003 – Sergio Ramos – California
- 2004 – Torrence Daniels – Colorado
- 2005 – Gary Russell Jr. – Washington, DC
- 2006 – Efraín Esquivias – California
- 2007 – Ronny Rios – California
- 2008 – Ernesto Garza – Saginaw
- 2009 – Jesus Magdaleno – Las Vegas
- 2010 - Toka Kahn-Clary - New England
- 2011 - Tramaine Williams - New England
- 2012 - Gervonta Davis - Washington, D.C.
- 2013 – Gary Antonio Russell – Washington D.C.
- 2014 – Ruben Villa – California
- 2015 - Ruben Villa - California
- 2016 - Duke Ragan - Ohio
- 2017 - Aaron Morales - Oklahoma
- 2018 – Felix Parrilla
- 2019 – Asa Stevens – Hawaii
