= Menchaca (surname) =

Menchaca is a surname common in the Basque country where it originated. The preferred modern spelling in Basque is Mentxaka. Although its origins are Basque, the name is also found in the area of Spain that borders the Basque Country, notably Burgos. Menchaca as a family name is registered in the Christian armies in the Middle Ages in Spain, during the Reconquista against the Moorish/Muslim kingdoms. Soldiers named Menchaca appear in the rosters of the Christian armies that conquered Granada in 1492. Today the surname exists in all nations originating in the former Spanish Empire, including countries in Latin America and the Caribbean, the Philippines, and Equatorial Guinea; due to Spain's prolonged stay in Italy, the surname also appears in Italy, Sicily and Sardinia; and it is found in the United States.

Notable people with the surname include:

- Antonio Menchaca (1800–1879), American soldier and politician from Texas
- Carlos Menchaca (born 1980), American soldier and politician from New York
- Dick Menchaca (1922–2005), boxer
- Diego Menchaca (born 1994), Mexican racing driver
- Juan Menchaca (born 1977), Uruguayan rugby player
- Ludivina Menchaca (born 1963), Mexican politician
- Marc Menchaca (born 1975), Texan actor
- Penélope Menchaca (born 1968), Los Angeles-based Mexican television host, singer, and actress

See also:

- Menchaca, corregimiento in Ocú District, Herrera Province, Panama
