= Moses Itauma =

British boxer (born 2004)

Personal information
- Born: Enriko Moses Itauma; 28 December 2004 (age 21) Kežmarok, Slovakia
- Height: 6 ft 4 1/2 in (194 cm)
- Weight: Heavyweight

Boxing career
- Reach: 79 in (201 cm)
- Stance: Southpaw

Boxing record
- Total fights: 15
- Wins: 14
- Win by KO: 12
- Losses: 1

Enriko Moses Itauma (born 28 December 2004) is a British professional boxer. He has challenged once for the IBF heavyweight title in August 2026. At regional level, he has held the Commonwealth heavyweight title since 2025.

== Early life ==
Enriko Moses Itauma was born in Slovakia in the town of Kežmarok to a Nigerian father and Slovak mother. He is the younger brother of light-heavyweight boxer Karol Itauma. He and his family experienced racism in Slovakia stating, "Me and my brothers got racially abused. It wasn't a good place to be." Finally, the family decided to migrate to England, firstly to leave the racist environment they were in and secondly to search for new opportunities which Slovakia did not provide. He was three years old when he moved to Chatham, Kent.

Growing up, his favourite fighter was Prince Naseem Hamed. Itauma has since stated that he tries to implement elements of Hamed's style into his own game, saying, "I used to watch a lot of Naseem Hamed. I must have watched the same video of him about 50 times, I remember it was a highlight reel which started off with him dancing. He was one of my favourite fighters. I've got a different style from him but I do try to implement some of the things he used to do." Itauma got into boxing at the age of nine through his brother Karol (who was an amateur boxer at the time) who then invited him to the boxing gym one day. However, after a few hard boxing sessions, he switched to playing football with his other brother Samuel. Later on, he switched back to boxing at St Mary's ABC in Chatham, Kent, after finding football boring.

At the age of 16, he reportedly went to a gym, still in his school uniform and sparred cruiserweight world champion Lawrence Okolie. Anthony Fowler, who was at the gym described the moment: "I walk in the gym and there’s this kid there in a school uniform. This kid just went forward the whole spar throwing bombs. I think he half-winded Lawrence with the left hand to the body. He was relentless for three rounds on him, throwing non-stop punches. No one could believe it in the gym."

== Amateur career ==
Itauma had an unbeaten amateur career, turning professional with a record of 24 wins with 11 wins by knockout. He claimed gold medals in Schools, Juniors, Youth European and the Heavyweight Youth World Gold Medal.

== Professional career ==
=== Early career ===
Itauma made his debut on the undercard of Artur Beterbiev vs. Anthony Yarde on 28 January 2023, at the Wembley Arena. He beat Marcel Bode in his debut via knockout after just 23 seconds. Itauma had aspirations for breaking Mike Tyson's record for being the youngest heavyweight champion in history, but he later described how it was just two months into his professional career when he realised that goal was "impossible."

Itauma won the vacant WBO Intercontinental heavyweight title with a second-round stoppage victory against Germany's Ilja Mezencev on the undercard of the Tyson Fury vs. Oleksandr Usyk bill in Saudi Arabia on 18 May 2024. He retained his title with another second-round stoppage win, this time over Polish boxer Mariusz Wach at The O2 Arena, London, on 27 July 2024.

In his next bout, he stopped Demsey McKean in the first round on 21 December 2024, at Kingdom Arena in Riyadh, Saudi Arabia, as part of the undercard for the heavyweight world title rematch between Oleksandr Usyk and Tyson Fury.

He was voted The Ring magazine Prospect of the Year for 2024.

Itauma knocked out Mike Balogun in the beginning of round two of their fight at the SSE Hydro in Glasgow on 24 May 2025.

=== Rise up the ranks ===
==== Itauma vs. Whyte ====
On 7 June 2025, a trio of fights was announced to take place in Riyadh, Saudi Arabia on 16 August (billed as "Esports World Cup Fight Week" after the esports tournament series held in Riyadh), with Dillian Whyte (31–3, 21 KOs) headlining against Itauma. Whyte disclosed that although he was presented with rematch opportunities against Anthony Joshua and Joseph Parker, he chose to take on the challenge of facing Itauma instead. He stated that Joshua "wasn't ready," and he was unable to reach an agreement with Parker. Whyte also hit out at former rival Derek Chisora, who revealed he rejected a $2 million offer to fight Itauma, before the fight was offered to him. Whyte likened his upcoming match with Itauma to the moment in 2004 when David Haye dramatically lost his undefeated status to Carl Thompson. He was motivated from that fight, feeling that as the underdog, he wasn't being given a chance to defeat Itauma. Whyte weighed in at 244.1 pounds, a stone lighter than his last bout and his lightest since 2015. Itauma weighed 245.5 pounds.

Itauma achieved a decisive victory over Whyte, securing a knockout in the first round within a duration of less than two minutes. From the outset, Itauma established dominance, utilizing his youth, speed, and power to gain the upper hand against Whyte. He delivered a rapid series of punches targeting both the head and body, efficiently pushing Whyte onto the ropes. Itauma delivered a right hook that caused Whyte to be knocked down, prompting the referee to stop the fight at 1:59 of the first round. Whyte landed only two jabs. Itauma landed 19 of 34 punches (55.9%). With this win, Itauma successfully claimed the vacant Commonwealth title.

==== Itauma vs. Franklin ====
Itauma faced Jermaine Franklin at Co-op Live in Manchester on 28 March 2026 and won by knockout in the fifth round; it was Franklin’s first loss by knockout. Ahead of the bout, Itauma hoped a fight longer in duration would showcase his stamina. The fight was originally scheduled for January 2026 but was postponed after he was injured during his training camp. Following a dominant performance where Itauma put Franklin down in the third round, Itauma won by knockout in the fifth round.

=== IBF heavyweight title challenge ===
==== Itauma vs. Hrgović ====
Itauma faced Filip Hrgović for the vacant IBF world title in August 2026 at The O2 Arena in London.

Despite winning every completed round on two of the judges' scorecards, the fight ended in Itauma's first professional defeat, losing by technical knockout (TKO) in the ninth round (2:27). Itauma forced his opponent to touch the canvas to find his balance in the second round. Hrgović later said that he thought he had lost every round, but Itauma was "gassed out" by the ninth round and his overexertion had been amateurish. Itauma ultimately left the ring on a stretcher, requiring oxygen. Both Itauma and promoter Warren said he would learn from the fight.

Itauma later explained he still hadn’t accepted the loss but took “full responsibility”. He said that the loss included only the third round he has lost in his professional boxing career. His opponent withstood the kind of punches that means, “he kind of deserves [the title].” He later recognised that he “fell short to the more experienced man” and would “go back to the drawing board, we assess it and move on.”

== Business interests ==
Itauma opened a new gym in Chatham in October 2026, in a project led by his brother, Karol. Club Eight^{3} partners also include Anis Mehmeti and Frank Wood, though Karol Itauma is now the only director.

== Professional boxing record ==
| 15 fights | 14 wins | 1 loss |
|---|---|---|
| By knockout | 12 | 1 |
| By decision | 2 | 0 |

| No. | Result | Record | Opponent | Type | Round, time | Date | Location | Notes |
|---|---|---|---|---|---|---|---|---|
| 15 | Loss | 14–1 | Filip Hrgović | TKO | 9 (12), 2:27 | 29 Aug 2026 | The O2 Arena, London, England | For vacant IBF heavyweight title |
| 14 | Win | 14–0 | Jermaine Franklin | TKO | 5 (10), 1:33 | 28 Mar 2026 | Co-op Live, Manchester, England | Retained WBA International and WBO Inter-Continental heavyweight titles |
| 13 | Win | 13–0 | Dillian Whyte | TKO | 1 (10), 1:59 | 16 Aug 2025 | anb Arena, Riyadh, Saudi Arabia | Retained WBA International and WBO Inter-Continental heavyweight titles; Won vacant Commonwealth heavyweight title |
| 12 | Win | 12–0 | Mike Balogun | TKO | 2 (10), 0:46 | 24 May 2025 | OVO Hydro, Glasgow, Scotland | Retained WBA International and WBO Inter-Continental heavyweight titles |
| 11 | Win | 11–0 | Demsey McKean | TKO | 1 (10), 1:57 | 21 Dec 2024 | Kingdom Arena, Riyadh, Saudi Arabia | Retained WBO Inter-Continental heavyweight title; Won vacant WBA International and Commonwealth Silver heavyweight titles |
| 10 | Win | 10–0 | Mariusz Wach | TKO | 2 (10), 2:30 | 27 Jul 2024 | The O2 Arena, London, England | Retained WBO Inter-Continental heavyweight title |
| 9 | Win | 9–0 | Ilja Mezencev | TKO | 2 (10), 0:50 | 18 May 2024 | Kingdom Arena, Riyadh, Saudi Arabia | Won vacant WBO Inter-Continental heavyweight title |
| 8 | Win | 8–0 | Dan Garber | TKO | 1 (8), 2:22 | 22 Mar 2024 | York Hall, London, England | |
| 7 | Win | 7–0 | Michal Boloz | TKO | 1 (6), 1:00 | 1 Dec 2023 | York Hall, London, England | |
| 6 | Win | 6–0 | István Bernáth | TKO | 1 (6), 1:53 | 28 Oct 2023 | Kingdom Arena, Riyadh, Saudi Arabia | |
| 5 | Win | 5–0 | Amine Boucetta | TKO | 1 (6), 1:33 | 23 Sep 2023 | Wembley Arena, London, England | |
| 4 | Win | 4–0 | Kevin Nicolas Espindola | PTS | 6 | 29 Jul 2023 | Telford International Centre, Telford, England | |
| 3 | Win | 3–0 | Kostiantyn Dovbyshchenko | PTS | 6 | 15 Apr 2023 | Copper Box Arena, London, England | |
| 2 | Win | 2–0 | Ramon Alberto Ibarra | KO | 1 (4), 0:35 | 25 Mar 2023 | Telford International Centre, Telford, England | |
| 1 | Win | 1–0 | Marcel Bode | KO | 1 (4), 0:23 | 28 Jan 2023 | Wembley Arena, London, England | |

== Pay-per-view bouts ==
| Date | Fight | Country | Network | Buys | Source(s) |
|---|---|---|---|---|---|
| 16 August 2025 | Moses Itauma vs. Dillian Whyte | United Kingdom | DAZN PPV | | |

== See also ==
- List of male boxers
- List of southpaw stance boxers
- Notable boxing families

Sporting positions
Regional boxing titles
| Vacant Title last held by Joseph Parker | WBO Inter-Continental heavyweight champion 18 May 2024 – 29 August 2026; Vacated | Vacant |
| Vacant Title last held by Kubrat Pulev | WBA International heavyweight champion 21 December 2024 – 29 August 2026; Vacated | Vacant |
| Vacant Title last held by Fabio Wardley | Commonwealth heavyweight champion 16 August 2025 – 29 August 2026; Vacated | Vacant |
Awards
| Previous: Bruce Carrington | The Ring Prospect of the Year; 2024 | Next: Emiliano Vargas |
