= Gary Russell Jr. =

American boxer

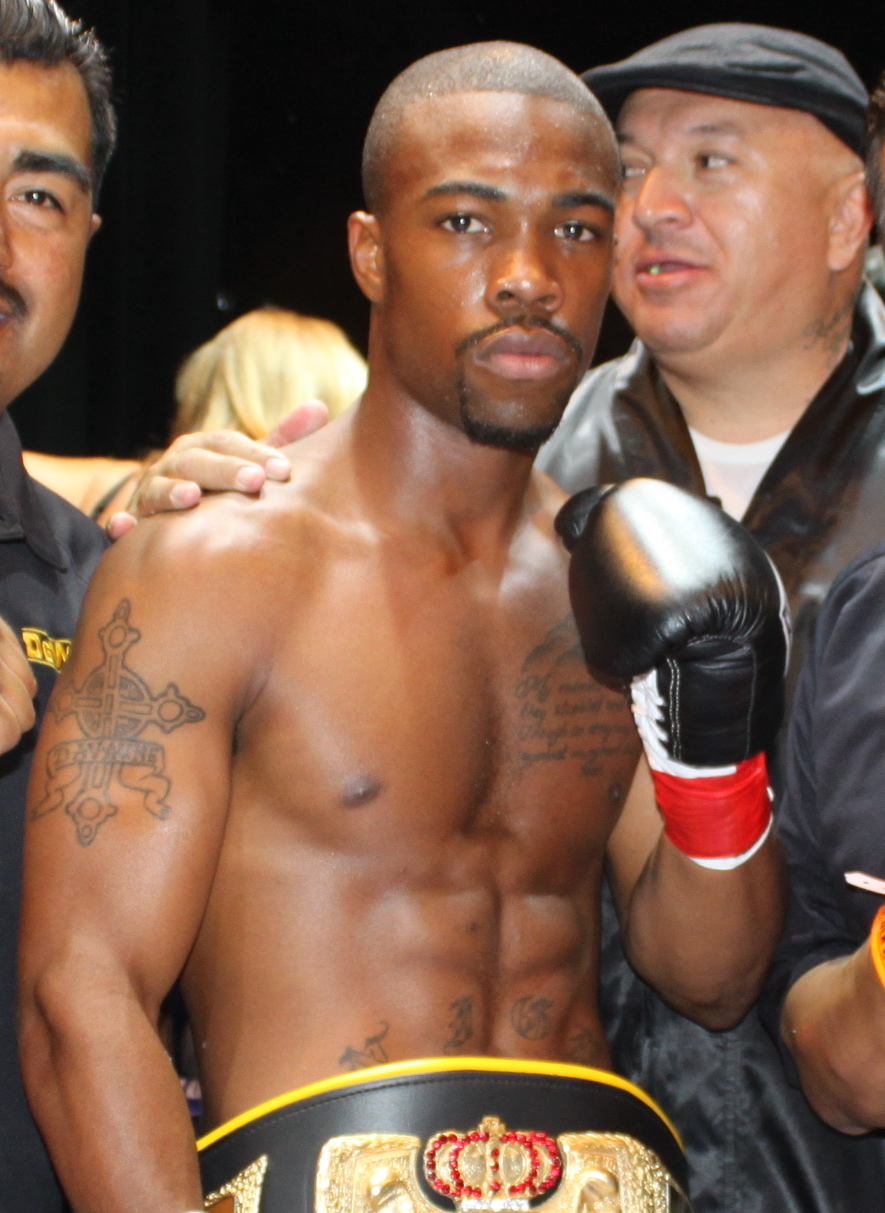
- Russell Jr. (center) in 2010

Personal information
- Born: June 5, 1988 (age 38) Washington, D.C., U.S.
- Height: 5 ft 4 1/2 in (164 cm)
- Weight: Featherweight

Boxing career
- Reach: 64 in (163 cm)
- Stance: Southpaw

Boxing record
- Total fights: 34
- Wins: 32
- Win by KO: 19
- Losses: 2
Medal record
Representing United States
Men's amateur boxing
World Championships
Bronze medal – third place	Mianyang 2005	Bantamweight
Golden Gloves
Gold medal – first place	2005 Little Rock	Bantamweight
National Championships
Gold medal – first place	2005 Colorado Springs	Bantamweight
Gold medal – first place	2006 Colorado Springs	Bantamweight
Silver medal – second place	2007 Colorado Springs	Bantamweight

Gary Allen Russell Jr. (born June 5, 1988) is an American professional boxer. He held the World Boxing Council (WBC) featherweight title from 2015 to 2022.

As an amateur, Russell won a bantamweight bronze medal at the 2005 World Championships. In 2011, he was named Prospect of the Year by The Ring, Sports Illustrated, and ESPN. He is the older brother of boxers Gary Antonio Russell and Gary Antuanne Russell, who compete at bantamweight and light welterweight, respectively.

== Amateur career and Olympics ==
Russell was selected for the American Olympic team to compete at the 2008 Olympics. However, he missed the Olympic weigh-in hours after losing consciousness, possibly due to dehydration, in his Olympic Village dorm room. Gary ended his amateur career with a record of 163-10.

== Professional career ==
=== Early career ===
Russell Jr. made his professional debut against Antonio Reyes on January 16, 2009. He amassed a 24–0 record during the next five years, with fourteen of those fights coming by way of stoppage.

On March 20, 2014, the WBO ordered Russell Jr. to face Vasiliy Lomachenko for the vacant featherweight title. As the two sides were unable to come to terms regarding the fight, a purse bid was called, which Golden Boy won with a bid of $1,052,500, while Top Rank bid $1,050,000. The fight took place on 21 June at the StubHub Center in Carson, California. Lomachenko defeated Russell Jr. via twelve-round majority decision to win the vacant WBO featherweight title. Judge Lisa Giampa scored the fight a 114–114 draw, but judges Max DeLuca and Pat Russell scored the fight 116–112 in favour of Lomachenko. The fight averaged 578,000 viewers.

=== WBC featherweight champion ===
==== Russell Jr. vs. González ====
On January 15, 2015, rumors surfaced that the reigning WBC featherweight champion Jhonny González would make his third title defense against Russell Jr. The title bout was officially announced as the event headliner of a Top Rank card held on March 28, 2015, at the Pearl Concert Theater in Paradise, Nevada. It was broadcast by Showtime domestically in the United States and by Mexico Televisa in Mexico. Russell Jr. entered the second title bout of his career as a slight favorite, with most odds-makers having him as a -175 to -190 betting favorite. He won the fight by a fourth-round technical knockout. Russell Jr. knocked González down twice in the third round, both times with a counter left. He once again knocked González down early on in the fourth round, before forcing referee Tony Weeks to stop the fight with a flurry of unanswered punches. Russell Jr. out-landed his opponent 59 to 14 in total punches, with a higher percentage of accurate shots. He expressed his desire to face Lomachenko in a rematch during the post-fight interview, stating: "I’m back in the gym on Monday, we’re definitely looking to get Lomachenko again".

==== Russell Jr. vs. Hyland ====
Russell Jr. was tentatively scheduled to face mandatory title challenger Óscar Escandón in his first title defense, sometime in November 2015. He was later forced to withdraw, due to injuries suffering in training. Russell Jr. was rescheduled to face Patrick Hyland in his first title defense on April 16, 2016, thirteen months after winning the belt. The title bout was booked as the event headliner of a card that took place at the Mohegan Sun Arena in Montville, Connecticut, and was broadcast by Showtime in United States and Canal Space in Latin America. Russell Jr. entered the bout as an overwhelming -5000 favorite to retain the belt, while Hyland was a +2000 underdog. He justified his role as the betting favorite, winning the fight by a second-round knockout. Hyland was knocked down three times by the 1:33 minute mark of the second round, prompting referee Danny Schiavone to wave the fight off.

==== Russell Jr. vs. Escandón ====
Russell Jr. was expected to make his second WBC title defense against the interim featherweight champion Óscar Escandón on February 18 at the U.S Bank Arena in Cincinnati, Ohio. Escandón withdrew from the bout on March 1, after suffering a back injury. Although the fight was initially postponed for April of the same year, Escandón's need for additional recovery time pushed back the fight date until May 27. The venue was likewise changed to the MGM National Harbor in Oxon Hill, Maryland. Russell Jr. once again entered a title defense as the favorite to retain, but a smaller once compared to his previous fight, with most odds-makers having him a -1400 favorite. In front of a crow of 2345 people, Russell Jr. retained the featherweight strap by a seventh-round technical knockout. Russell Jr. dominated the bout from the start, with his most dominant round being the third, in which he dropped Escandón with a right uppercut and which one of the judges scored as a 10–7. He finally stopped Escandón with a right hook to the temple at the 0:59 minute mark of the seventh round, which left him unable to continue fighting. Russell Jr.'s second title defense averaged 481 000 viewers on Showtime, and peaked at 517 000.

==== Russell Jr. vs. Diaz ====
On March 13, 2018, the WBC ordered Russell Jr. to make his third title defense against the #1 ranked featherweight contender and mandatory title challenger Joseph Diaz. The pair was given a thirty day negotiation period before a purse bid would be held. The two camps came to a verbal agreement regarding the terms of the fight on April 6. The fight was officially announced on April 10. It was booked to headline the May 19 Showtime card, which took place at the MGM National Harbor in Oxon Hill, Maryland. Russell Jr. justified his role as the betting favorite, winning the fight by unanimous decision, with all three judges scoring the fight 117–111 in his favor. Despite retaining the title by a convincing decision, Russell Jr. was unhappy with his performance, saying: "I was disappointed in my performance because I wasn't planning on going the distance, I hurt the right hand, but I still had to use it because he could not get past my jab".

==== Russell Jr. vs. Martínez ====
In March 2019, rumors surfaced that Russell Jr. would face the former IBF super-bantamweight champion Kiko Martínez in his fourth title defense. The title bout was officially announced on April 20, 2019. Russell Jr. was booked to face Martínez, at the time the #3 ranked WBC featherweight contender, on May 18, 2019, on the undercard of the Deontay Wilder and Dominic Breazeale WBC heavyweight title clash. During a pre-fight interview, Russell Jr. claimed that he tried to arrange a title unification bout with either Carl Frampton or Leo Santa Cruz, which failed to pan out. He voiced his frustration in the same interview, stating: "After this Kiko Martinez fight, if I don’t immediately get Leo Santa Cruz then I am vacating my title and I will be moving up to challenge Miguel Berchelt for his WBC title". Russell Jr. beat Martínez by a fifth-round technical knockout by doctor stoppage, due to a cut above Martínez's left eye. He was leading on all three of the judges' scorecards at the time of the stoppage, and had out-landed Martínez 100 to 40 over the course of the five rounds.

==== Russell Jr. vs. Nyambayar ====
On October 23, 2019, at the WBC’s 57th annual convention, Russell Jr. was ordered to make his fifth WBC title defense against the #1 ranked mandatory title challenger Tugstsogt Nyambayar. The fight was booked as the event headliner of a February 8, 2020, Showtime card that took place at the PPL Center in Allentown, Pennsylvania. Just as in all of his title fights, Russell Jr. was seen as the favorite to retain. He won the fight by unanimous decision, with scores of 118–110, 117–111 and 116–112.

==== Russell Jr. vs. Magsayo ====
On March 8, 2021, the WBC announced that Russell Jr. had come to terms for a mandatory title defense against the former WBC super bantamweight champion, and #1 ranked featherweight contender, Rey Vargas. Vargas was later forced to withdraw from the fight, as he suffered a leg fracture. On September 21, 2021, the WBC instead ordered Russell Jr. to make his sixth title defense against the #2 ranked featherweight contender and mandatory title challenger Mark Magsayo. The title bout was scheduled as the main event of a Showtime broadcast card, which took place at the Borgata in Atlantic City, New Jersey on January 22, 2022. Russell Jr. had trouble making weight on the first weigh-in, coming in at 126.5 pounds (.5 over the championship limit), although he was able to successfully make weight on the second weigh-in an hour later. He nonetheless entered the bout as the favorite to retain, with most odds-makers having him a -380 favorite. Russell Jr. lost the title by majority decision. Two judges scored the fight 115–113 for Magsayo, while the third judge scored the fight as an even 114–114 draw. Russell Jr. threw far fewer strikes compared to his previous fights, and was out-landed 150 to 69 in total punches and 140 to 58 in power punches. He blamed an undisclosed right arm injury for his decreased volume, saying "I refused to put this fight back, and I fought with one arm".

=== Post-championship ===
Russell Jr. is scheduled to face Hugo Castaneda in a lightweight bout at MGM Grand Garden Arena in Las Vegas on July 19, 2025.

== Professional boxing record ==
34 fights	32 wins	2 losses
By knockout	19	0
By decision	13	2

No.	Result	Record	Opponent	Type	Round, time	Date	Location	Notes
34	Win	32–2	Hugo Castañeda	TKO	10 (10), 0:26	Jul 19, 2025	MGM Grand Garden Arena, Paradise, Nevada, U.S.	
33	Loss	31–2	Mark Magsayo	MD	12	Jan 22, 2022	Borgata, Atlantic City, New Jersey, U.S.	Lost WBC featherweight title
32	Win	31–1	Tugstsogt Nyambayar	UD	12	Feb 8, 2020	PPL Center, Allentown, Pennsylvania, U.S.	Retained WBC featherweight title
31	Win	30–1	Kiko Martínez	TKO	5 (12), 2:52	May 18, 2019	Barclays Center, New York City, New York, U.S.	Retained WBC featherweight title
30	Win	29–1	Joseph Diaz	UD	12	May 19, 2018	MGM National Harbor, Oxon Hill, Maryland, U.S.	Retained WBC featherweight title
29	Win	28–1	Óscar Escandón	TKO	7 (12), 0:59	May 20, 2017	MGM National Harbor, Oxon Hill, Maryland, U.S.	Retained WBC featherweight title
28	Win	27–1	Patrick Hyland	KO	2 (12), 1:33	Apr 16, 2016	Mohegan Sun Arena, Montville, Connecticut, U.S.	Retained WBC featherweight title
27	Win	26–1	Jhonny González	TKO	4 (12), 0:37	Mar 28, 2015	Pearl Concert Theater, Paradise, Nevada, U.S.	Won WBC featherweight title
26	Win	25–1	Christopher Martin Peña	UD	10	Dec 20, 2014	Little Creek Casino Resort, Shelton, Washington, U.S.	
25	Loss	24–1	Vasiliy Lomachenko	MD	12	Jun 21, 2014	StubHub Center, Carson, California, U.S.	For vacant WBO featherweight title
24	Win	24–0	Miguel Tamayo	KO	4 (8), 1:04	Jan 30, 2014	Barclays Center, New York City, New York, U.S.	
23	Win	23–0	Juan Ruiz	UD	10	Aug 9, 2013	Fantasy Springs Resort Casino, Indio, California, U.S.	
22	Win	22–0	Vyacheslav Gusev	UD	10	Mar 2, 2013	The Joint, Paradise, Nevada, U.S.	
21	Win	21–0	Roberto Castaneda	KO	3 (10), 1:25	Nov 9, 2012	Fantasy Springs Resort Casino, Indio, California, U.S.	
20	Win	20–0	Christopher Pérez	TKO	3 (10), 1:41	Jun 30, 2012	Fantasy Springs Resort Casino, Indio, California, U.S.	
19	Win	19–0	Heriberto Ruiz	KO	1 (10), 2:12	Nov 26, 2011	U.S. Bank Arena, Cincinnati, Ohio, U.S.	
18	Win	18–0	Leonilo Miranda	UD	8	Sep 3, 2011	Beau Rivage, Biloxi, Mississippi, U.S.	
17	Win	17–0	Eric Estrada	UD	8	Jul 23, 2011	Mandalay Bay Events Center, Paradise, Nevada, U.S.	
16	Win	16–0	Antonio Meza	KO	4 (8), 2:42	Jun 17, 2011	State Farm Arena, Hidalgo, Texas, U.S.	
15	Win	15–0	Adolfo Landeros	UD	6	Apr 15, 2011	Longshoremen's Hall, San Francisco, California, U.S.	
14	Win	14–0	Feider Viloria	TD	7 (8), 0:50	Jan 28, 2011	Four Points by Sheraton, San Diego, California, U.S.	Unanimous TD: Viloria cut from an accidental head clash
13	Win	13–0	Guadalupe de Leon	UD	6	Oct 28, 2010	Nokia Theatre L.A. Live, Los Angeles, California, U.S.	
12	Win	12–0	Willie Villanueva	KO	1 (6), 2:56	Sep 25, 2010	Fitzgeralds Casino and Hotel, Tunica Resorts, Mississippi, U.S.	
11	Win	11–0	Mauricio Pastrana	TKO	1 (6), 1:46	Jul 22, 2010	Nokia Theatre L.A. Live, Los Angeles, California, U.S.	
10	Win	10–0	Rodrigo Aranda	KO	2 (6), 0:34	Jun 24, 2010	Nokia Theatre L.A. Live, Los Angeles, California, U.S.	
9	Win	9–0	Carlos Diaz	KO	1 (6), 1:32	Apr 16, 2010	The New Daisy Theatre, Memphis, Tennessee, U.S.	
8	Win	8–0	Jairo Delgado	KO	1 (6), 2:38	Feb 19, 2010	Wolstein Center, Cleveland, Ohio, U.S.	
7	Win	7–0	David Orosco Cano	TKO	1 (4), 2:58	Jan 30, 2010	Fitzgeralds Casino and Hotel, Tunica Resorts, Mississippi, U.S.	
6	Win	6–0	Rodrigo Romero	TKO	3 (4), 0:38	Dec 18, 2009	Grand Casino Mille Lacs, Hinckley, Minnesota, U.S.	
5	Win	5–0	Noe Lopez Jr.	UD	4	Oct 23, 2009	Entertainment Center, Laredo, Texas, U.S.	
4	Win	4–0	Jason Jones	TKO	1 (4), 0:28	Aug 7, 2009	Star of the Desert Arena, Primm, Nevada, U.S.	
3	Win	3–0	Alvaro Muro	UD	4	May 1, 2009	Chumash Casino Resort, Santa Ynez, California, U.S.	
2	Win	2–0	John Wampash	UD	4	Feb 14, 2009	BankAtlantic Center, Sunrise, Florida, U.S.	
1	Win	1–0	Antonio Reyes	TKO	3 (4), 0:21	Jan 16, 2009	Million Dollar Elm Casino, Tulsa, Oklahoma, U.S.	

== See also ==
- Notable boxing families

Sporting positions
Amateur boxing titles
Previous: Torrence Daniels	U.S. Golden Gloves bantamweight champion 2005	Next: Efraín Esquivias
Previous: Roberto Benitez	U.S. bantamweight champion 2005, 2006	Next: Ronny Rios
World boxing titles
Preceded by Jhonny González	WBC featherweight champion March 28, 2015 – January 22, 2022	Succeeded by Mark Magsayo
Awards
Previous: Michael Moorer; 1988; discontinued until 2011	The Ring Prospect of the Year; 2011	Next: Keith Thurman
Previous: Canelo Álvarez	ESPN Prospect of the Year; 2011	Next: David Price
