= Boxing at the 2018 Summer Youth Olympics – Boys' light heavyweight =

Boxing competitions

Boys' light heavyweight boxing at the III Summer Youth Olympic Games
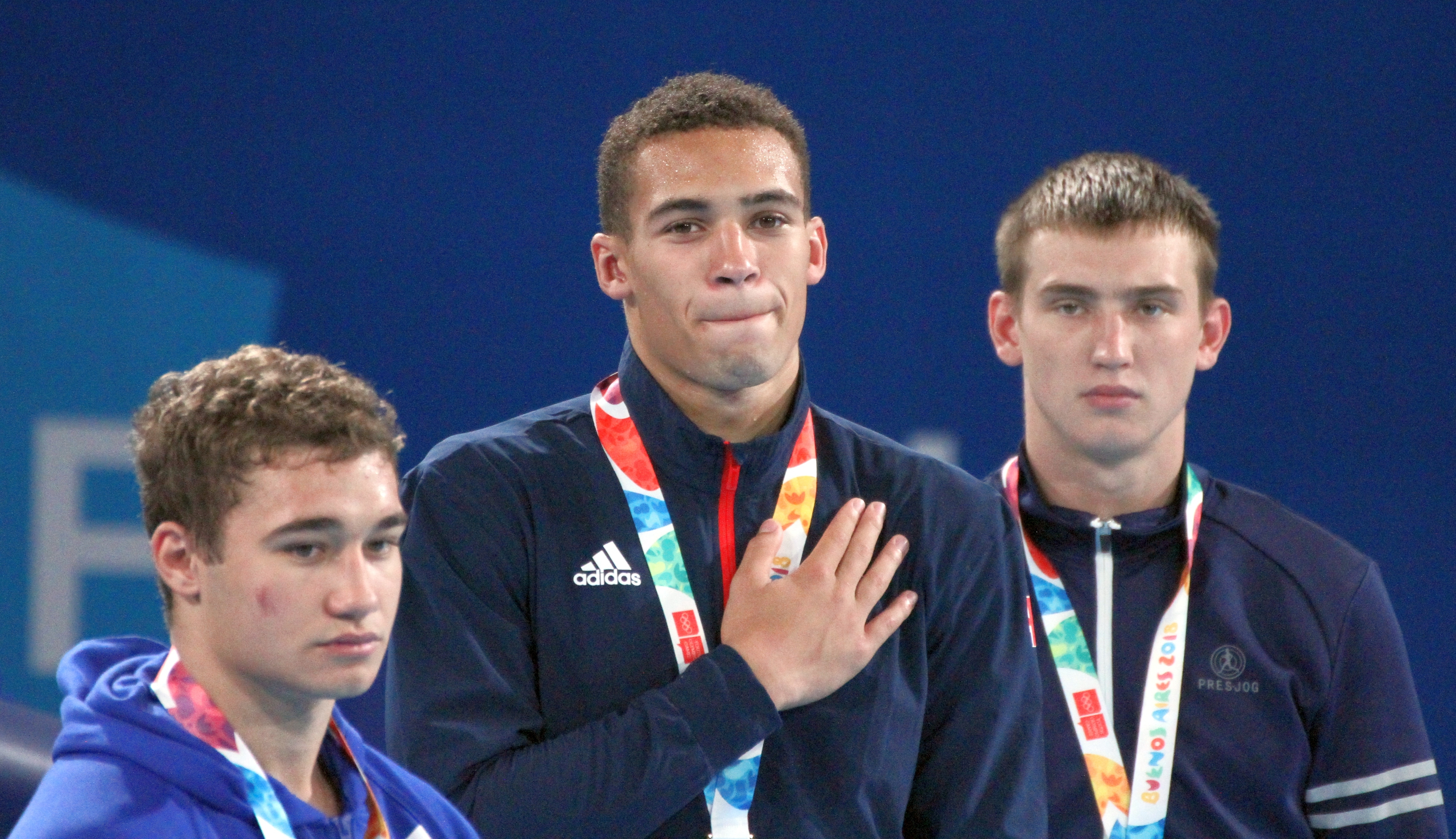
- Boys' light heavyweight Victory Ceremony
- Venue: Oceania Pavilion
- Date: 14–18 October
- Competitors: 6 from 6 nations

Medalists
1st place, gold medalist(s)		Karol Itauma	Great Britain
2nd place, silver medalist(s)		Ruslan Kolesnikov	Russia
3rd place, bronze medalist(s)		Timur Merjanov	Uzbekistan

The boys' light heavyweight boxing competition at the 2018 Summer Youth Olympics in Buenos Aires was held from 14 to 18 October at the Oceania Pavilion.

== Schedule ==
All times are local (UTC−3).

Date	Time	Round
Sunday, 14 October	14:32	Preliminary Round 1
Monday, 15 October	14:14	Preliminary Round 2
Tuesday, 16 October	14:31	Semifinals
Thursday, 18 October	14:29	Finals

== Results ==
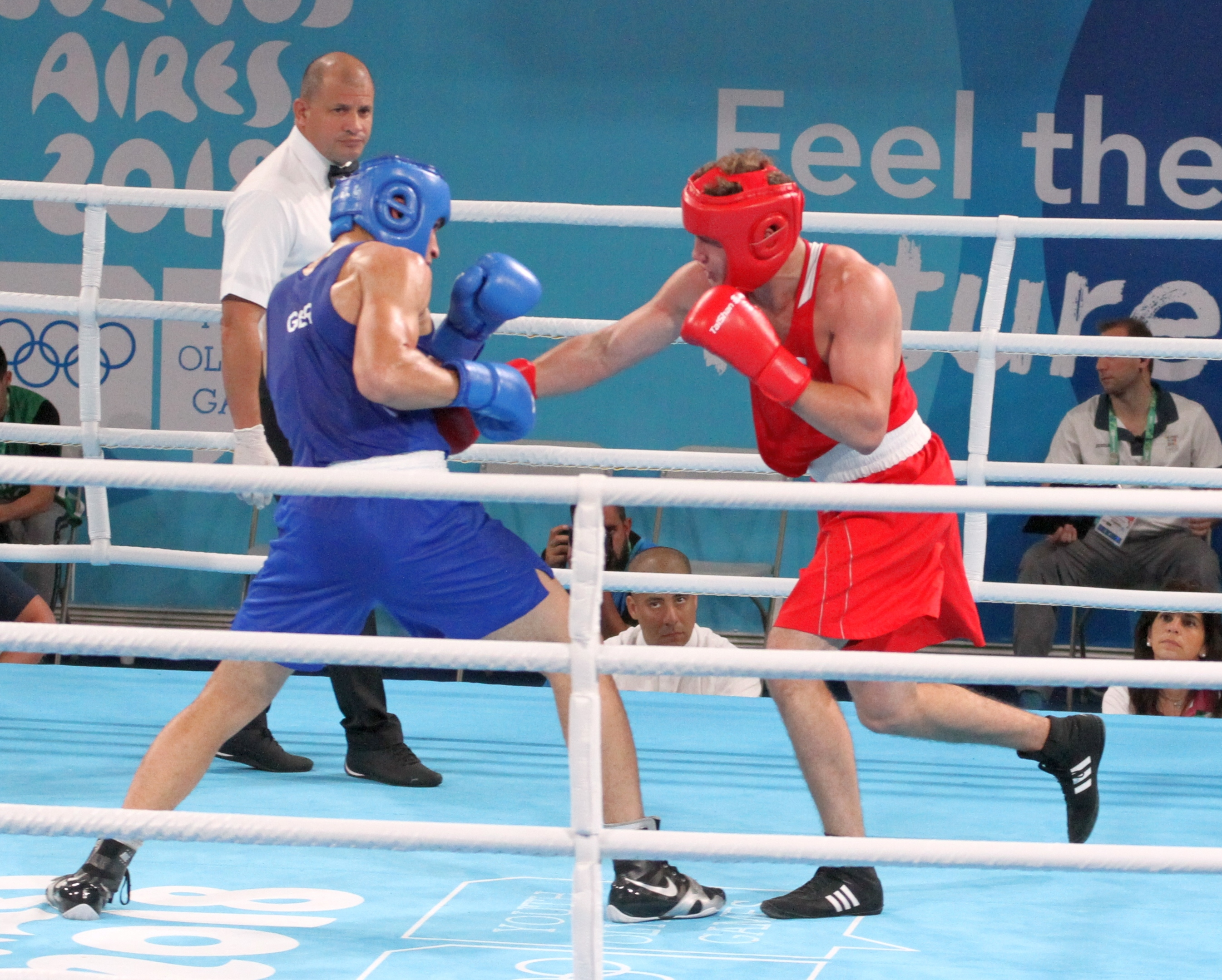
Gold Medal Bout Itauma (blue) vs Kolesnikov (red)

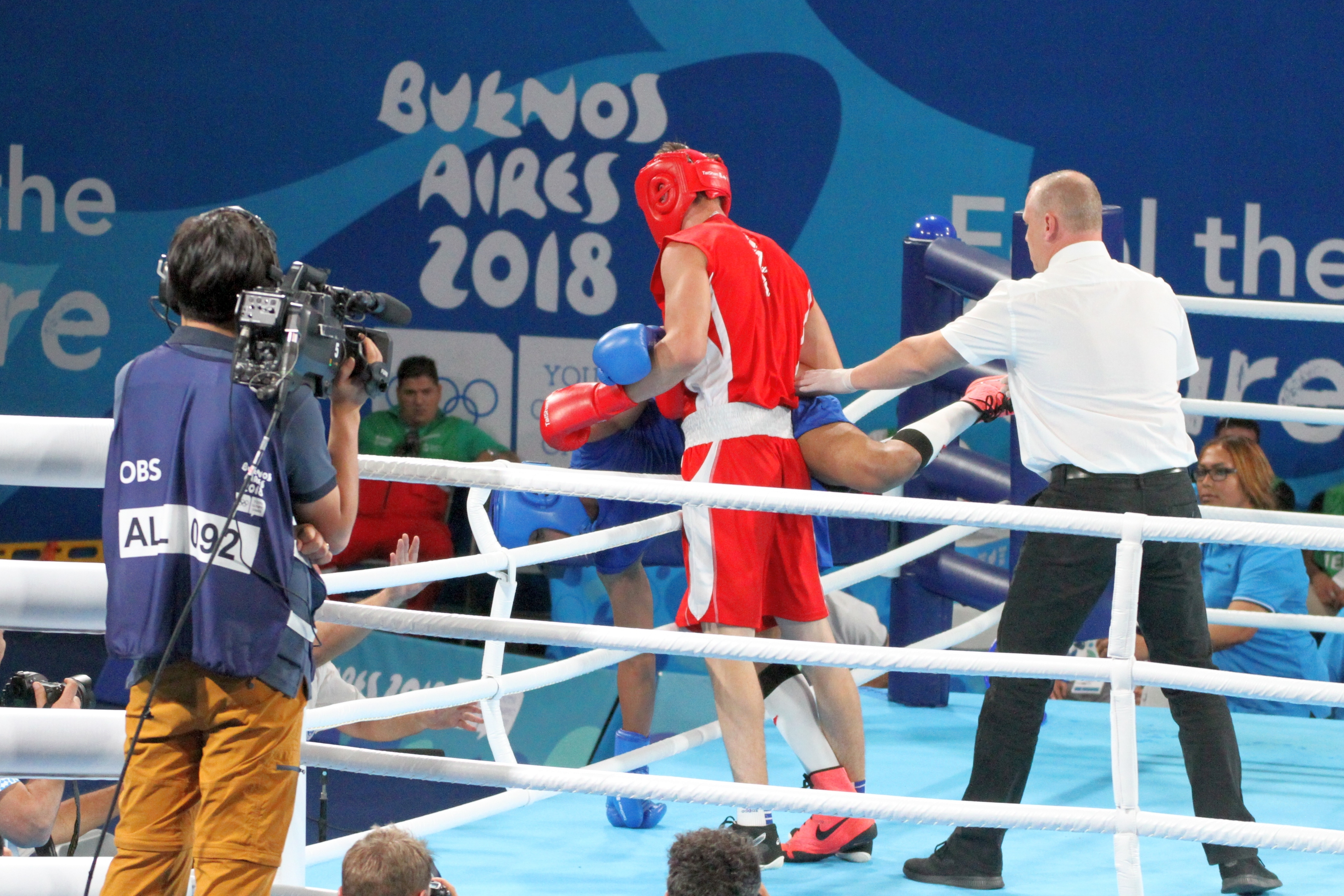
Bronze Medal Bout Merjanov (red) vs Ali Karar (blue)

Preliminary Round 1
Timur Merjanov (UZB)	4
Seyedsajad Mousavipaeindezaei (IRI)	1
Karol Itauma (GBR)	5
Jancarmelo Morales (PUR)	0

Preliminary Round 2
Ruslan Kolesnikov (RUS)	KO
Seyedsajad Mousavipaeindezaei (IRI)
Jancarmelo Morales (PUR)	0
Youssef Ali Karar (EGY)	5

Semifinals
Timur Merjanov (UZB)	0
Ruslan Kolesnikov (RUS)	5
Youssef Ali Karar (EGY)	0
Karol Itauma (GBR)	5
Fifth place
Seyedsajad Mousavipaeindezaei (IRI)
Jancarmelo Morales (PUR)	WO

Final
Ruslan Kolesnikov (RUS)	1
Karol Itauma (GBR)	4
Third place
Timur Merjanov (UZB)	5
Youssef Ali Karar (EGY)	0

== Final standings ==
Rank	Athlete
1st place, gold medalist(s)	Karol Itauma (GBR)
2nd place, silver medalist(s)	Ruslan Kolesnikov (RUS)
3rd place, bronze medalist(s)	Timur Merjanov (UZB)
4	Youssef Ali Karar (EGY)
5	Jancarmelo Morales (PUR)
6	Seyedsajad Mousavipaeindezaei (IRI)
