= Igor Fedorov =

Russian boxer

Igor Federov Игорь Фёдоров
Personal information
- Born: Azov, Russia
- Height: 6 ft 1 in (185 cm)
- Weight: Heavyweight

Boxing career
- Stance: Orthodozx
Medal record
Men's amateur boxing
Representing Russia
Youth World Championships
Gold medal – first place	2018 Budapest	Heavyweight
European Youth Championships
Gold medal – first place	2018 Roseto	Heavyweight

Igor Borisovich Fedorov (Russian: Игорь Борисович Фёдоров) is a Russian amateur boxer who won gold medals at the 2018 Youth World Championships, and European Youth Championships, both in the heavyweight division.
