= Criztian Pitt Laurente =

Filipino boxer

- Criztian Pitt interviewed at the International Games 2022

Personal information
- Nickname: Golden Boy
- Born: January 15, 2000 (age 26) General Santos, Philippines
- Height: 5 ft 7 in (170 cm)
- Weight: Super featherweight; Bantamweight

Boxing career
- Stance: Southpaw

Boxing record
- Total fights: 17
- Wins: 17
- Win by KO: 11
- Losses: 0
- Draws: 0
- No contests: 0
Medal record
Men's amateur boxing
International Boxing Association
Bronze medal – third place	2018 AIBA Youth World Boxing Championships	Bantamweight
Association of Boxing Alliances in the Philippines
Gold medal – first place	2016 Philippine National Games	Bantamweight
Gold medal – first place	2014 Palarong Pambansa	Bantamweight
Gold medal – first place	2012 Palarong Pambansa	Bantamweight

Criztian Pitt Laurente, Nicknamed "Golden Boy" (born January 15, 2000) is a Filipino prospect and professional boxer from General Santos.

== Early life and education ==
Laurente was born on January 15, 2000, in General Santos, Philippines. He is the son of Christino Laurente and Lalay Napoles. He is the third of four siblings, one of whom, Russu Laurente, is also a television personality and former amateur boxer.

Criztian completed his elementary schooling in General Santos but dropped out of high school due to his boxing career. Throughout his amateur boxing career, he was cited as the best junior boxer in Asia in 2016 by Asian Boxing Confederation. He was also cited during 2017 PSA Annual Awards and 2019 PSA Annual Awards handed out by Philippine Sportswriters Association.

Later, Laurente was awarded as a Young Hero during the 1st Siklab Sports Youth Awards by the Philippine Olympic Committee.

== Boxing career ==
Criztian Pitt Laurente has an amateur record of 14–3 and a record of 12–0 as a professional, with 7 wins by knockout. He represented the Philippines to the 2018 AIBA Youth World Boxing Championships, Asian Junior Boxing Championships, Children of Asia International Games, Asian Youth Boxing Championships, and Palarong Pambansa.

On May 26, 2024, Criztian Pitt Laurente represented the Philippines for the 2024 Olympic Qualifier Series and Boxing at the 2024 Summer Olympics – Qualification, but soon bid his farewell as he lost against his rival opponent, Mukhammedsabyr Bazarbay of Kazakhstan, with a unanimous 5-0 decision.

== Professional boxing record ==
17 fights	17 wins	0 losses
By knockout	11	0
By decision	6	0

No.	Result	Record	Opponent	Type	Round, time	Date	Location	Notes
17	Win	17–0	Benchalong Tanbu	KO	3 (10)	2026-09-26	UH-FCC, Pattaya, Thailand	Won vacant WBF (Foundation) Intercontinental lightweight title
16	Win	16–0	Jing Aguan	TKO	4 (10)	2026-06-14	Villa Kristen Resort and Hotel, General Santos, Philippines	
15	Win	15–0	Hebi Marapu	UD	10	2025-08-31	Phela Grande Convention Center, General Santos, Philippines	Won vacant IBF Pan Pacific lightweight title
14	Win	14–0	Alvin Lagumbay	KO	2 (8), 1:59	2025-04-27	Venue 88, General Santos, Philippines	
13	Win	13–0	Alven Vergara	KO	1 (8), 2:47	2024-12-07	The Flash Grand Ballroom of the Elorde Sports Complex, Parañaque, Philippines	
12	Win	12–0	Munkhdalai Batochir	UD	8	2023-03-11	Cheongpyeong Family Hotel, Cheongpyeong, South Korea	
11	Win	11–0	JR Magboo	KO	1 (10), 0:45	2022-11-20	Mandaluyong City College, Mandaluyong, Philippines	Won vacant PBF super featherweight title
10	Win	10–0	Richard Bulacan	UD	10	2022-06-18	Mobo, Masbate Philippines	
9	Win	9–0	Vicente Casido	UD	2 (8), 2:12	2022-02-26	Sanman Gym, General Santos, Philippines	
8	Win	8–0	Ernie Sanchez	TKO	5 (8), 0:33	2021-10-23	Bawing Gym, General Santos, Philippines	
7	Win	7–0	Kim Lindog	KO	3 (8),2:59	2021-07-16	Tabunoc Sports Complex, Talisay, Philippines	
6	Win	6–0	Ernesto Saulong	UD	8	2021-03-20	Biñan Football Stadium, Biñan, Philippines	
5	Win	5–0	Boyce Sultan	UD	6	2020-02-08	Barangay Apas Sports Complex, Cebu City, Philippines	
4	Win	4–0	Jasper Cayno	UD	6	2019-12-14	The Flash Grand Ballroom of the Elorde Sports Complex, Parañaque, Philippines	
3	Win	3–0	Christian Gabayeron	KO	1 (4), 0:32	2019-08-24	San Andres Civic & Sports Center, Manila, Philippines	
2	Win	2–0	Rogelio Boyles	TKO	2 (4), 0:59	2019-06-28	Maco Municipal Gym, Maco, Philippines	
1	Win	1–0	Rey John Indita	TKO	2 (4), 1:24	2019-04-30	Robinson’s Mall Atrium, General Santos, Philippines	

== Controversies ==
=== Canceled Fight ===
On February 5, 2022, several minutes before the main event started, Doctor Unabia canceled Laurente due to unknown pre-fight medical scans.
