= Ruslan Kolesnikov =

Russian boxer (born 2000)

Ruslan Kolesnikov Руслан Колесников
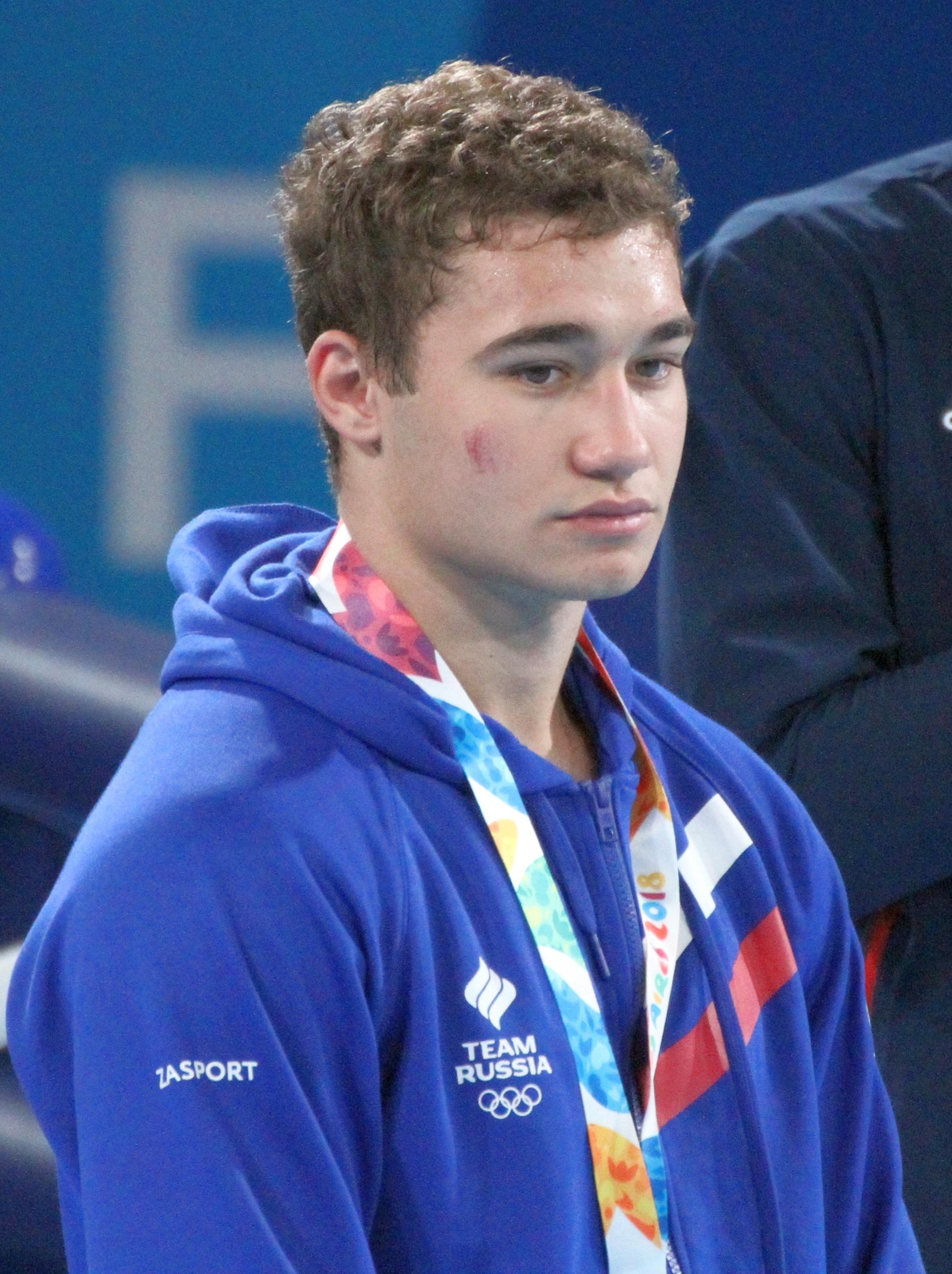
- Medal ceremony at 2018 Youth Olympics

Personal information
- Nationality: Russian
- Born: 24 February 2000 (age 26) Azov, Russia
- Height: 6 ft 1 in (185 cm)
- Weight: Light-heavyweight

Boxing career
- Stance: Orthodox
Medal record
Men's amateur boxing
Representing Russia
Youth Olympic Games
Silver medal – second place	2018 Buenos Aires	Light-heavyweight
Youth World Championships
Gold medal – first place	2018 Budapest	Light-heavyweight
European Youth Championships
Gold medal – first place	2017 Antalya	Light-heavyweight
Gold medal – first place	2018 Roseto	Light-heavyweight

Ruslan Olegovic Kolesnikov (Russian: Руслан Олегович Колесников; born 24 February 2000) is a Russian amateur boxer who won gold medals at the 2017 and 2018 European Youth Championships, 2018 Youth World Championships, and silver at the 2018 Youth Olympics, all in the light-heavyweight division.
