= Engels Pedroza =

Venezuelan boxer (born 1966)

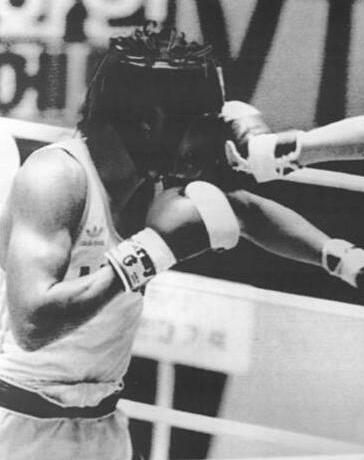
- Pedroza in 1985

Boxing career
Medal record
Men's amateur boxing
Representing Venezuela
World Cup
Silver medal – second place	1985 Seoul	Lightweight

Engels Pedroza (born 26 September 1966) is a former Venezuelan boxer.

== Biography ==
Pedroza was born on 26 September 1966, in San Carlos, Cojedes. In 1985, he represented Venezuela on the amateur World Cup in Seoul, gaining a silver medal in lightweights. The same year he scored a victory over future professional world champion Joey Gamache in a USA-Venezuela duel meet. One year later he participated on the 1986 World Amateur Boxing Championships in Reno, where he again won a silver medal in lightweights after losing in the final to three-time amateur world champion Adolfo Horta of Cuba.

Also in 1986, he turned professional, and after a successful career start he was named Ring Magazine Prospect of the Year in 1987. This award existed between 1983 and 1988, and among others it was issued to future world champions Mark Breland, Mike Tyson and Michael Moorer.

He lost his first professional bout after 19 victories in 1988 against Mike Johnson via a ninth-round TKO, clearly being ahead on all three scorecards. After going 7-1 in his next eight bouts, he was matched up against Young Dick Tiger for the IBF intercontinental welterweight title, and won by a third round TKO. He defended his title once, but then vacated the belt and continued his career against mostly journeyman opposition. He fought on for various minor titles, but came up short all times, including a seventh round TKO loss against future world champion Bronco McKart in 1994.

Finally in 1996 he managed to capture another title, the WBA Fedecentro light middleweight belt. However on his first title defense he lost to future world title challenger Pedro Ortega and retired afterwards. His professional career record concluded 42-9-0.

Preceded by Mike Williams	The Ring Prospect of the Year; 1987	Succeeded by Michael Moorer
