= 1st Siklab Sports Youth Awards =

2018 Philippine sports awards

- Date: June 27, 2018
- Location: Century Park Hotel, Malate, Manila
- Country: Philippines
- Hosted by: Gerry Ramos (spin.ph); Waylon Galvez (Manila Bulletin); Abac Cordero (The Philippine Star)

Television/radio coverage
- Network: Hyper on Cignal

The 1st Siklab (Spark) Sports Youth Awards, or the 1st Phoenix Siklab Sports Youth Awards, for sponsorship reasons, is an awarding ceremony bestowed upon young Philippine sports personalities aged 17 and below who are excelled in different local and international sports competitions. The Siklab Sports Youth Awards is organized by the PSC–POC Media Group, an organization composed of esteemed sportswriters, both print and online who are covering the Philippine Sports Commission (PSC), the Philippine Olympic Committee (POC), the National Sports Associations (NSAs), and the National Athletes and Teams beat assignments, and it is headed by June V. Navarro of the Philippine Daily Inquirer.

The inaugural edition of the yearly event was originally scheduled for April 2018, but it was later moved to June 27, 2018, set to be held at the Century Park Hotel Grand Ballroom, Malate, Manila.

== Honor roll ==
=== Sports Idol Award ===
The award was given to Olympic silver medalists Mansueto Velasco and Hidilyn Diaz who serves as an inspiration to young Filipino sportsmen.

Winner	Sport/Recognition	References
Mansueto Velasco	Boxing (1996 Atlanta Summer Olympics silver medalist)	
Hidilyn Diaz	Weightlifting (2016 Rio de Janeiro Summer Olympics silver medalist)	

=== POC Young Heroes Award ===
The Young Heroes award were given to 24 young athletes who shined in different local and international tourneys/

Winner	Sport	References
Mary Angeline Alcantara	Taekwondo	
Sarah Barredo	Badminton	
Rafael Barreto	Swimming	
Ghen-Yan Cruz Bendon	Muay Thai	
Samantha Kyle Catantan	Fencing	
Chezka Centeno	Billiards	
Kaitlin De Guzman	Gymnastics	
Kenneth dela Peña	Boxing	
Allaney Jia Doroy	Chess	
Alexandria "Alex" Eala	Tennis	
Jhonzenth Gajo	Gymnastics	
Bea Hernandez	Bowling	
Rex Luis Krog	Cycling	
Criztian Pitt Laurente	Boxing	
Alberto "AJ" Lim Jr.	Tennis	
Bhay Newberry	Swimming	
John Vincent Pangga	Boxing	
Rosegie Ramos	Weightlifting	
Andrew Kim Remolino	Triathlon	
Nicole Marie Tagle	Archery	
Maria Takahashi	Judo	
Angelo Kenzo Umali	Bowling	
Veruel Verdadero	Athletics	
Carlos Edriel "Caloy" Yulo	Gymnastics	

=== POC Super Kids Award ===
The POC Super Kids Award were given to outstanding young athletes that has competed in collegiate sports competitions including the University Athletic Association of the Philippines and the National Collegiate Athletic Association, as well as the Philippine National Games.

Winner	Sport	References
Keith Absalon	Football	
Tara Borlain	Athletics	
Justin Ceriola	Jiu-jitsu	
Trojan Dangadang	Canoe–Kayak	
Jane Linette Hipolito	Weightlifting	
Eya Laure	Volleyball	
Dexy Manalo	Canoe–Kayak	
Morris Marlos	Sailing	
Rizumu Ono	Table tennis	
Daniel Quizon	Chess	
John Paolo Rivera Jr.	Weightlifting	
Kai Sotto	Basketball	
Christine Talledo	Dragon boat	
Marco Imbang Umgeher	Alpine skiing	

=== PSC Children's Games for Peace Award ===
The PSC Children's Games for Peace Award were given to talented young athletes who are won medals in major age-group sports events including the Batang Pinoy and the Palarong Pambansa.

Winner	Sport	References
Jayvee Alvarez	Athletics	
Phoebe Nicole Amistoso	Archery	
Althea Michel Baluyut	Swimming	
Jared Cole Sua	Archery	
Michaela Jasmine Mojdeh	Swimming	
Kyla Ong Soguilon	Swimming	
Rick Angelo Sotto	Archery	
Princes Sheryl Valdez	Arnis	
Karl Jahrel Eldrew Yulo	Gymnastics	
Ethan Zafra	Archery	

== See also ==
- 2018 in Philippine sports
- Siklab Atleta
- PSA Athlete of the Year
