= Mike Balogun =

American football player and boxer (born 1983)

Personal information
- Nationality: American
- Born: Michael James Balogun; September 28, 1983 (age 43) Upper Marlboro, Maryland, U.S.
- Height: 6 ft 1 in (185 cm)
- Weight: Heavyweight

Boxing career
- Stance: Southpaw

Boxing record
- Total fights: 23
- Wins: 21
- Win by KO: 16
- Losses: 2

Mike Balogun (born September 28, 1983) is an American professional boxer, and a former professional football linebacker. He was signed as an undrafted free agent by the San Francisco 49ers in 2010. He played college football for the Oklahoma Sooners.

He has also played for the Washington Redskins, Tampa Bay Buccaneers, Buffalo Bills, Dallas Cowboys, and Virginia Destroyers.

== College career ==
Balogun began at Lackawanna College in Scranton, Pennsylvania. He was a standout inside linebacker for the Oklahoma Sooners in 2008. He was declared ineligible to play the 2009 season because he allegedly played for the Maryland Marauders of the North American Football League, a minor league team in Maryland after turning 21 years old.

== Professional Football career ==
Mike Balogun
No. 55, 53
- Position: Linebacker

Career information
- High school: Suitland (Suitland, Maryland)
- College: Oklahoma Lackawanna College
- NFL draft: 2010: undrafted

Career history
- San Francisco 49ers (2010)*; Washington Redskins (2010)*; Tampa Bay Buccaneers (2010)*; Buffalo Bills (2010); Dallas Cowboys (2011)*; Virginia Destroyers (2011); Tampa Bay Buccaneers (2011–2012)*; Indianapolis Colts (2012)*; Virginia Destroyers (2012)
- * Offseason or practice squad member only

Awards and highlights
- UFL champion (2011)
- Stats at Pro Football Reference

=== San Francisco 49ers ===
The San Francisco 49ers signed Balogun before training camp in 2010. He was cut during the final cuts on September 3, 2010.

=== Washington Redskins ===
Balogun signed to the Washington Redskins' practice squad on September 6, 2010.

=== Tampa Bay Buccaneers ===
Balogun signed to the Tampa Bay Buccaneers' practice squad on October 11, 2010.

=== Buffalo Bills ===
Balogun was signed by the Buffalo Bills on November 10, 2010. He played in his first career game in week 13. He was released on February 11, 2011.

=== Dallas Cowboys ===
Balogun was signed by the Dallas Cowboys on February 14, 2011.

=== Indianapolis Colts ===
The Indianapolis Colts signed Balogun on August 15, 2012.

== Professional Boxing career ==
Balogun is also a heavyweight boxer. He knocked out Trey Lippe Morrison (the son of Tommy Morrison) in one round. Balogun has won 21 fights and lost two against Murat Gassiev and Moses Itauma who knocked him out in round two of their fight at the SSE Hydro in Glasgow, Scotland, on 24 May 2025.

== Professional boxing record ==
23 fights	21 wins	2 losses
By knockout	16	2
By decision	5	0

No.	Result	Record	Opponent	Type	Round, time	Date	Location	Notes
23	Loss	21–2	Moses Itauma	TKO	2 (10), 0:46	24 May 2025	OVO Hydro, Glasgow, Scotland	For WBA International and WBO Inter-Continental heavyweight titles
22	Win	21–1	Lamont Capers	UD	8	Mar 16, 2024	Crosswhite Athletic Club, Lynchburg	
21	Loss	20–1	Murat Gassiev	KO	2 (10), 1:41	Mar 3, 2023	Karen Demirchyan Complex, Yerevan, Armenia	For vacant WBA Inter-Continental heavyweight title
20	Win	20–0	Marcus Oliveira	TKO	2 (8), 0:56	Oct 6, 2022	Mayflower Hotel, Washington, D.C., U.S.	
19	Win	19–0	Sergio Ramirez Marin	KO	2 (8), 1:47	Apr 15, 2022	Garden Theatre, Detroit, Michigan, U.S.	
18	Win	18–0	Trey Lippe Morrison	TKO	1 (10), 2:41	Dec 2, 2021	Hammerstein Ballroom, New York City, New York, U.S.	
17	Win	17–0	Keith Barr	TKO	2 (8), 2:45	Apr 10, 2021	The Rustica, Vero Beach, Florida, U.S.	
16	Win	16–0	Adnan Buharalija	RTD	2 (8), 3:00	Feb 8, 2020	Tysons Playground, Vienna, Virginia, U.S.	
15	Win	15–0	Mike Bissett	TKO	1 (8), 1:50	Oct 24, 2019	Hilton Crystal City Hotel, Washington, D.C., U.S.	
14	Win	14–0	Ed Fountain	UD	8	Aug 1, 2019	Monroeville Convention Center, Pittsburgh, Pennsylvania, U.S.	
13	Win	13–0	Marquis Valentine	TKO	6 (6), 2:29	Apr 20, 2019	Rosecroft Raceway, Fort Washington, Maryland, U.S.	
12	Win	12–0	Danny Calhoun	KO	1 (6)	Feb 16, 2019	Mountaineer Casino, Racetrack and Resort, New Cumberland, West Virginia, U.S.	
11	Win	11–0	Terrance Marbra	UD	6	May 26, 2017	Boca Raton Resort & Club, Boca Raton, Florida, U.S.	
10	Win	10–0	Grover Young	UD	6	Apr 29, 2017	ABC Sports Complex, Springfield, Virginia, U.S.	
9	Win	9–0	Branden Lee Hinkle	TKO	1 (6), 1:26	Oct 20, 2016	Mayflower Hotel, Washington, D.C., U.S.	
8	Win	8–0	Demonte Cherry	TKO	1 (4), 1:43	Sep 30, 2016	Sphinx Club, Washington, D.C., U.S.	
7	Win	7–0	Luther Smith	TKO	2 (6), 1:52	Aug 19, 2016	Hilton Crystal City Hotel, Washington, D.C., U.S.	
6	Win	6–0	Devon Mosley	TKO	1 (4), 1:08	May 13, 2016	D.C. Armory, Washington, D.C., U.S.	
5	Win	5–0	Lonnie Kornegay	UD	4	Jul 24, 2015	Horseshoe Casino, Baltimore, Maryland, U.S.	
4	Win	4–0	Charlemagne Jones	KO	1 (4), 2:00	Mar 28, 2015	ABC Sports Complex, Springfield, Virginia, U.S.	
3	Win	3–0	Cody Troutman	KO	1 (4), 0:11	Dec 6, 2014	ABC Sports Complex, Springfield, Virginia, U.S.	
2	Win	2–0	Percy Womack	TKO	1 (4), 1:20	Nov 15, 2014	Patriot Center, Fairfax, Virginia, U.S.	
1	Win	1–0	Maurice Womack	TKO	2 (4)	Oct 23, 2014	Renaissance Hotel, Washington, D.C., U.S.	
