= Ankit Khatana =

Indian boxer (born 1998)

Personal information
- Born: 9 September 1998 (age 27) Gurgaon district, Haryana, India

Sport
- Sport: Boxing
- Weight class: Lightweight (60 Kg)
Medal record
amateur boxing
Representing India
Youth World Championships
Bronze medal – third place	2018 Budapest	Lightweight
South Asian Games
Gold medal – first place	2019 Kathmandu	Lightweight

Ankit Khatana is an Indian amateur boxer. He won the bronze medal at the 2018 Youth World Championships held in Hungary. He has been a National Champion, 2019 and was a gold medalist at the 2019 South Asian Games. In International tournaments he won the bronze at the 36th Feliks Stamm International Tournament, Poland.

== Career ==
Khatana started his boxing career by participating in 28th Sub Junior Men State Boxing Championship in 2013 and won the bronze medal in the 41st Junior Men Haryana State Boxing Championship 2015–16. Next he won the gold medal in the South Asian Games held in Kathmandu, Nepal. He next won the silver medal in the AIBA Youth World Boxing Championships 2018. In 2019, Khatana then participated in the 4th Elite men's national boxing championship held in Himachal Pradesh where he bagged a gold medal.
