= Mike Williams (boxer) =

American boxer, born 1962

Personal information
- Nickname: Mercury
- Nationality: American
- Born: Michael Anthony Williams
- Height: 6 ft 4 1/2 in (194 cm)
- Weight: Heavyweight

Boxing career
- Reach: 83 in (211 cm)
- Stance: Orthodox

Boxing record
- Total fights: 28
- Wins: 22
- Win by KO: 14
- Losses: 6

Michael Anthony Williams (born June 16, 1962) is an American actor and former professional boxer who competed from 1984 to 2000. In the 1990 film Rocky V, he played the role of boxer Union Cane.

== Boxing career ==
Known as "Mercury", Williams turned professional in 1984 and was considered a rising prospect after winning his first 13 fights, including a win over James Tillis. In 1987, he stepped up and lost a split decision to the former champion Tim Witherspoon. The following year, he lost by TKO to Buster Douglas. In the 1990s, he lost to other notable heavyweights Alex Garcia and Corrie Sanders and retired in 2000 after a TKO loss to Lawrence Clay Bey, having won 22 and lost 6 with 14 KO.

== Acting career ==
Williams portrayed the fictional heavyweight champion of the world Union Cane in Rocky V. In the movie, he was soundly defeated in one round by Tommy Gunn. Williams also played background characters in various other films, such as A Soldier's Story, Full Metal Jacket, Another 48 Hrs., Ali, Losing Isaiah, Soldier Boyz, The Boys Club, The Replacements, A Sense of Entitlement and The Brave One. He also appeared in some TV shows, such as Homicide: Life on the Street and The F.B.I. Files.

== Professional boxing record ==
28 fights	22 wins	6 losses
By knockout	14	4
By decision	8	2

No.	Result	Record	Opponent	Type	Round, time	Date	Location	Notes
28	Loss	22–6	Lawrence Clay-Bey	TKO	6 (10), 0:35	Sep 17, 2000	Cobo Arena, Detroit, Michigan, U.S.	
27	Loss	22–5	Albert Stewart	SD	8	Sep 7, 1999	Memphis, Tennessee, U.S.	
26	Win	22–4	Gary Butler	TKO	4 (6)	Dec 9, 1995	Moody Gardens, Galveston, Texas, U.S.	
25	Loss	21–4	Corrie Sanders	KO	1 (10), 2:58	Mar 19, 1994	Carousel Casino, Hammanskraal, South Africa	
24	Win	21–3	Rick Hoard	KO	2	Aug 5, 1993	Council Bluffs, Iowa, U.S.	
23	Loss	20–3	Alex García	TKO	5 (12), 2:14	Feb 16, 1993	McNichols Sports Arena, Denver, Colorado, U.S.	For NABF heavyweight title
22	Win	20–2	Jimmy Bills	UD	8	Dec 16, 1992	Riviera, Winchester, Nevada, U.S.	
21	Win	19–2	Elvin Evans	UD	6	Nov 3, 1992	Memphis, Tennessee, U.S.	
20	Win	18–2	Juan Ramon Perez	UD	4	Feb 25, 1992	Houston, Texas, U.S.	
19	Win	17–2	Russell Rierson	KO	2	Nov 19, 1991	Houston, Texas, U.S.	
18	Loss	16–2	Buster Douglas	TKO	7	Jun 27, 1988	Convention Hall, Atlantic City, New Jersey, U.S.	
17	Win	16–1	Dorcey Gaymon	TKO	2 (10), 1:10	Mar 4, 1988	Bingo Wonderland, Houston, Texas, U.S.	
16	Win	15–1	Art Terry	UD	10	Feb 3, 1988	Houston, Texas, U.S.	
15	Win	14–1	Leon Dixon	TKO	2 (10), 2:53	Jan 6, 1988	Houston, Texas, U.S.	
14	Loss	13–1	Tim Witherspoon	SD	10	Oct 14, 1987	Steel Pier, Atlantic City, New Jersey, U.S.	
13	Win	13–0	Rufus Hadley	PTS	10	May 22, 1987	Houston, Texas, U.S.	
12	Win	12–0	Ken Elliott	TKO	3 (10), 1:06	Apr 9, 1987	Houston, Texas, U.S.	
11	Win	11–0	Billy Joe Thomas	TKO	7 (10), 1:26	Feb 12, 1987	Felt Forum, New York City, New York, U.S.	
10	Win	10–0	James Tillis	TKO	8 (10), 2:48	Jan 8, 1987	Marriott Brookhollow, Houston, Texas, U.S.	
9	Win	9–0	Robert Obey	KO	4	Dec 14, 1986	Houston, Texas, U.S.	
8	Win	8–0	Tommy Taylor	TKO	5 (6), 1:28	Oct 17, 1986	Sahara Hotel and Casino, Winchester, Nevada, U.S.	
7	Win	7–0	Terry Armstrong	PTS	6	Jul 5, 1986	Conroe, Texas, U.S.	
6	Win	6–0	John Barbier	KO	2	May 2, 1986	Conroe, Texas, U.S.	
5	Win	5–0	Carl Dorsey	TKO	3	Feb 12, 1986	Houston, Texas, U.S.	
4	Win	4–0	Ronald Turner	UD	4	Aug 23, 1985	Atlantis Hotel and Casino, Atlantic City, New Jersey, U.S.	
3	Win	3–0	Lorenzo Boyd	KO	3 (6)	Mar 18, 1985	Hyatt Regency, Houston, Texas, U.S.	
2	Win	2–0	Guy Ramsey	UD	4	Mar 8, 1985	Westchester County Center, White Plains, New York, U.S.	
1	Win	1–0	Walter Morris	KO	3	Sep 13, 1984	The Summit, Houston, Texas, U.S.	

Sporting positions
Amateur boxing titles
Previous: Craig Payne	U.S. Golden Gloves super heavyweight champion 1984	Next: James Pritchard
Awards
Previous: Mike Tyson	The Ring Prospect of the Year; 1986	Next: Engels Pedroza
