= The Ring magazine Prospect of the Year =

Boxing award

The Ring magazine was established in 1922 and has named a Prospect of the Year since 1983. The award is given to a boxer who has the most potential to become a future star in the sport, as based on the magazine's writers' criteria. In 1989 the award was discontinued, but was reinstated in 2011.

1983 – (United States) Kenny Baysmore
1984 – (United States) Mark Breland
1985 – (United States) Mike Tyson
1986 – (United States) Mike Williams
1987 – (Venezuela) Engels Pedroza
1988 – (United States) Michael Moorer
2011 – (United States) Gary Russell Jr.
2012 – (United States) Keith Thurman
2013 – (Ukraine) Vasyl Lomachenko
2014 – (United Kingdom) Anthony Joshua
2015 – (Japan) Takuma Inoue
2016 – (United States) Erickson Lubin
2017 – (Mexico) Jaime Munguia
2018 – (United States) Teófimo López
2019 – (United States) Vergil Ortiz Jr.
2020 – (United States) Jaron Ennis
2021 – (United States) Brandun Lee
2022 – (United States) Keyshawn Davis
2023 – (United States) Bruce Carrington
2024 – (United Kingdom) Moses Itauma
2025 – (United States) Emiliano Vargas
