= 2018 AIBA Youth World Boxing Championships =

Boxing competition

- Venue: Danube Arena
- Location: Budapest, Hungary
- Dates: 21–30 August

The 2018 AIBA Youth World Boxing Championships were held in Budapest, Hungary, from 21 to 31 August. The competition is under the supervision of the world's governing body for amateur boxing, AIBA, and is the youth and junior version of the World Amateur Boxing Championships. The competition was open to boxers born in 2000 and 2001. It was the second time in the tournament's history that men and women fought in the same championship.

== Medal summary ==
=== Men ===
Event	Gold	Silver	Bronze
Light flyweight (–49 kg)	Thitisan Panmod; Thailand	Jan Paul Rivera; Puerto Rico	Jude Gallagher; Ireland Makhmud Sabyrkhan; Kazakhstan
Flyweight (–52 kg)	Asa Stevens; United States	Hopey Price; England	Bhavesh Kattimani; India Luiz Oliveira; Brazil
Bantamweight (–56 kg)	Abdumalik Khalokov; Uzbekistan	Vsevolod Shumkov; Russia	Criztian Pitt Laurente; Philippines Noppharat Thakhui; Thailand
Lightweight (–60 kg)	Atichai Phoemsap; Thailand	Adrián Orbán; Hungary	Ankit Khatana; India Mohamed Mamdouh; Egypt
Light welterweight (–64 kg)	Idalberto Umará; Cuba	Ilya Popov; Russia	Bader Samreen; Jordan Maksim Molodan; Ukraine
Welterweight (–69 kg)	Dzhambulat Bizhamov; Russia	Ermakhan Zhakpekov; Kazakhstan	Sho Usami; Japan Peerapat Yeasungnoen; Thailand
Middleweight (–75 kg)	Nurbek Oralbay; Kazakhstan	Daniil Teterev; Russia	Navo Tamazov; Uzbekistan Conner Tudsbury; England
Light heavyweight (–81 kg)	Ruslan Kolesnikov; Russia	Sagyndyk Togambay; Kazakhstan	Cristian Pinder; Cuba Aliaksei Alfiorau; Belarus
Heavyweight (–91 kg)	Igor Fedorov; Russia	Aibek Oralbay; Kazakhstan	Javokhir Tugaymuratov; Uzbekistan Mohamed Hacid; Algeria
Super heavyweight (+91 kg)	Aleksei Dronov; Russia	Damir Toybay; Kazakhstan	Kyrylo Stoianchev; Ukraine Ahmed El-Sawy; Egypt

=== Women ===
Event	Gold	Silver	Bronze
Light flyweight (–48 kg)	Nitu Ghanghas; India	Nillada Meekoon; Thailand	Anel Kudaibergen; Kazakhstan Kseniia Beschastnova; Russia
Flyweight (–51 kg)	Heaven Garcia; United States	Anamika Hooda; India	Zhansaya Abdraimova; Kazakhstan Kittiya Nampai; Thailand
Bantamweight (–54 kg)	Iyana Verduzco; United States	Aizada Yeslyamgali; Kazakhstan	Aycan Güldağı; Turkey Phonnapa Lapan; Thailand
Featherweight (–57 kg)	Sakshi Chaudhary; India	Nikolina Ćaćić; Croatia	Isamary Aquino; United States Sena Irie; Japan
Lightweight (–60 kg)	Caroline Dubois; England	Nune Asatryan; Russia	Rebeca Santos; Brazil Jony; India
Light welterweight (–64 kg)	Gemma Richardson; England	Manisha; India	Lanna Maliuganova; Russia Veronika Villás; Hungary
Welterweight (–69 kg)	Charlie Cavanagh; Canada	Angelina Kabakova; Russia	Paige Goodyear; England Alina Popp; Germany
Middleweight (–75 kg)	Anastasiia Shamonova; Russia	Tallya Brillaux; France	Georgia O'Connor; England Astha Pahwa; India
Light heavyweight (–81 kg)	Anastasiia Rybak; Russia	Guzal Sadykova; Kazakhstan	Sakshi Gaidhani; India Karolina Makhno; Ukraine
Heavyweight (+81 kg)	Dina Islambekova; Kazakhstan	Mariia Lovchynska; Ukraine	Neha Yadav; India

== Medal table ==
* Host nation (Hungary)

Rank	Nation	Gold	Silver	Bronze	Total
1	Russia	6	5	2	13
2	United States	3	0	1	4
3	Kazakhstan	2	6	3	11
4	India	2	2	6	10
5	Thailand	2	1	4	7
6	England	2	1	3	6
7	Uzbekistan	1	0	2	3
8	Cuba	1	0	1	2
9	Canada	1	0	0	1
10	Ukraine	0	1	3	4
11	Hungary*	0	1	1	2
12	Croatia	0	1	0	1
12	France	0	1	0	1
12	Puerto Rico	0	1	0	1
15	Brazil	0	0	2	2
15	Egypt	0	0	2	2
15	Japan	0	0	2	2
18	Algeria	0	0	1	1
18	Belarus	0	0	1	1
18	Germany	0	0	1	1
18	Ireland	0	0	1	1
18	Jordan	0	0	1	1
18	Philippines	0	0	1	1
18	Turkey	0	0	1	1
Totals (24 entries)		20	20	39	79
