= Paige Goodyear =

English boxer (born 2000)

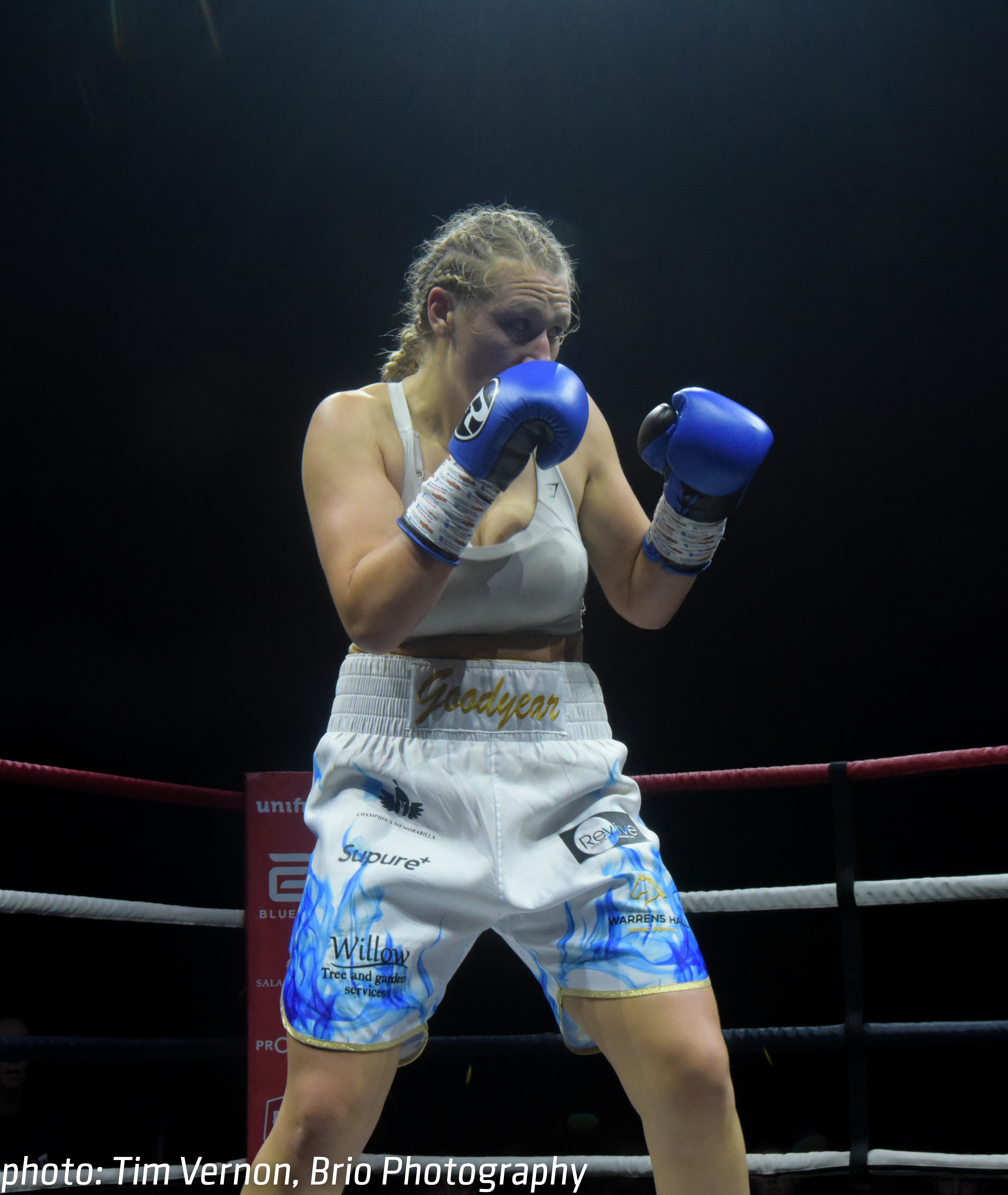

Personal information
- Nickname: The Hammer
- Nationality: English
- Born: 8 December 2000 (age 25) Wordsley, West Midlands, England
- Height: 170 cm (5 ft 7 in)
- Weight: Welterweight, Super-welterweight

Boxing career

Boxing record
- Total fights: 7
- Wins: 7
- Win by KO: 1
Medal record
Women's amateur boxing
Representing England
Youth World Championships
| Bronze medal – third place | 2018 Budapest | Welterweight |

Paige Goodyear (born 8 December 2000) is an English professional boxer who as an amateur won a bronze medal at the 2018 Youth World Championships.

== Career ==
Goodyear started boxing aged 11 and made her big breakthrough as an amateur in 2018 when she reached the quarter-finals of the European Youth Championships in Italy in April before winning a bronze medal at the 2018 Youth World Championships held in Hungary in August.

She turned professional in 2022, making her debut at the DoubleTree Hilton Hotel in Sheffield on 29 April with a points win over Argentina's Linda Karen Asencio. After three victories from three fights which all went the scheduled distance, Goodyear recorded her first stoppage success when she beat Marija Zivkovic by technical knockout in the fourth-round of their contest at The Eastside Rooms in Birmingham on 30 July 2023.

Following almost two years away from the competitive boxing ring due to a hand injury and personal issues, Goodyear, defeated Bojana Libiszewska on points in a six-round contest at The Hangar Events Venue in Wolverhampton on 23 May 2025.

== Professional boxing record ==
| 7 fights | 7 wins | 0 losses |
|---|---|---|
| By knockout | 1 | 0 |
| By decision | 6 | 0 |

| No. | Result | Record | Opponent | Type | Round, time | Date | Location | Notes |
|---|---|---|---|---|---|---|---|---|
| 7 | Win | 7–0 | Bojana Libiszewska | PTS | 6 | 21 March 2026 | Aldersley Leisure Village, Wolverhampton, England | |
| 6 | Win | 6–0 | Erica Juana Gabriela Alvarez | PTS | 6 | 24 October 2025 | Aldersley Leisure Village, Wolverhampton, England | |
| 5 | Win | 5–0 | Bojana Libiszewska | PTS | 6 | 23 May 2025 | The Hangar Events Venue, Wolverhampton, England | |
| 4 | Win | 4–0 | Marija Zivkovic | TKO | 4 (6), 0:24 | 30 July 2023 | The Eastside Rooms, Birmingham, England | |
| 3 | Win | 3–0 | Ester Konecna | PTS | 6 | 10 June 2023 | Town Hall, Dudley, England | |
| 2 | Win | 2–0 | Ester Konecna | PTS | 4 | 7 October 2022 | Magna Centre, Rotherham, England | |
| 1 | Win | 1–0 | Linda Karen Asencio | PTS | 4 | 29 April 2022 | DoubleTree Hilton Hotel, Sheffield, England | |
