= Karol Itauma =

British boxer (born 2000)

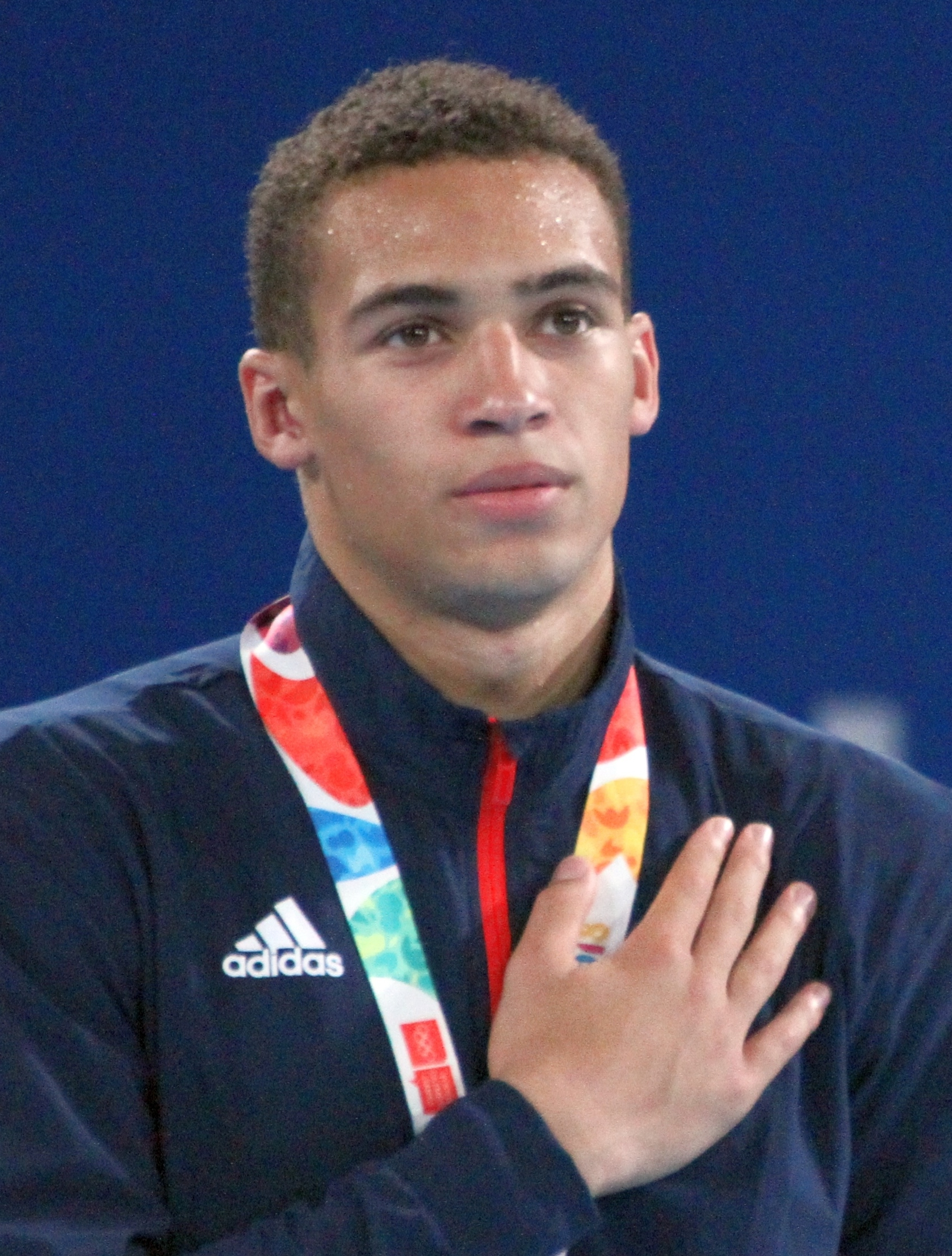

Personal information
- Nationality: British, Slovak
- Born: 20 November 2000 (age 25) Kežmarok, Slovakia
- Height: 6 ft 1 in (185 cm)
- Weight: Light-heavyweight

Boxing career
- Stance: Southpaw

Boxing record
- Total fights: 14
- Wins: 13
- Win by KO: 8
- Losses: 1
Medal record
Men's amateur boxing
Representing Great Britain
Youth Olympic Games
Gold medal – first place	2018 Buenos Aires	Light-heavyweight

Karol Itauma (born 20 November 2000) is a British former professional boxer. As an amateur, Itauma won a gold medal at the 2018 Youth Olympics.

== Professional career ==
Itauma was born in Slovakia in the town of Kežmarok to a Nigerian father and Slovak mother. He moved to Kent, England, at a young age. On 10 March 2020, it was announced that Itauma had signed a professional contract with Queensberry Promotions. Itauma made his professional debut on 5 December 2020 against Lewis Van Poetsch. Itauma won via wide points decision after winning every round on the referees scorecard.

Itauma’s second bout as a professional was against Ryan Hibbert on 24 April 2021. Itauma knocked his opponent down with a left hook in the opening moments of the first round. Hibbert was put on the canvas for a second time midway through the opening round after Ituama landed another left hook. Itauma was declared the winner after knocking his opponent down for a third time in first round. On 10 July 2021, Itauma fought against Tim Ventrella. In the second the round, Itauma trapped his opponent against the ropes and landed a combination of punches which put Ventrella onto the canvas. Itauma secured the win after his opponent was deemed unable to carry on following the knockdown.

On 10 September 2021, Itauma fought against Darryl Sharp. Itauma won via points decision after dominating the duration of the bout. Itauma fought against Tamas Laska on 4 December 2021. Itauma won via technical knockout after landing a heavy shot to the body of Laska during the opening round. Itauma's next bout was against Jiri Kroupa on 11 March 2022. After controlling the entirety of the fight, Itauma landed a heavy right hook followed by a flurry of unanswered punches which forced the referee to end the bout in the third round.

Itauma faced Michal Ciach on the undercard of Tyson Fury vs. Dillian Whyte on 23 April 2022 at Wembley Stadium. In the opening round Itauma landed a combination of punches to the head and body which knocked his opponent down. In the second round, Itauma continued to pressure Ciach and scored a second knockdown after landing a number of unanswered punches. The second knockdown resulted in the referee calling an end to the bout. On 16 July 2022, Itauma fought against Michal Gazdik. After dominating the opening three rounds, Itauma landed a barrage punches in the opening minute of the fourth round. Following this exchange, the referee called an end to the bout.

After suffering a heart attack in 2024, Itauma retired from professional boxing the following year and opened a health club in 2026.

== Personal life ==
His younger brother Moses Itauma is also a professional boxer in the heavyweight division.

== Professional boxing record ==
14 fights	13 wins	1 loss
By knockout	8	1
By decision	5	0

No.	Result	Record	Opponent	Type	Round, time	Date	Location	Notes
14	Win	13–1	Michal Ludwiczak	TKO	3 (6), 2:10	1 Mar 2025	Bournemouth International Centre, Bournemouth, England	
13	Win	12–1	Eros Seghetti	PTS	8	10 Feb 2024	Copper Box Arena, London, England	
12	Win	11–1	Dmytro Fedas	PTS	8	6 Oct 2023	York Hall, London, England	
11	Win	10–1	Khalid Graidia	PTS	8	12 May 2023	York Hall, London, England	
10	Loss	9–1	Ezequiel Maderna	KO	5 (10), 1:04	28 Jan 2023	Wembley Arena, London, England	For vacant WBC International light-heavyweight title
9	Win	9–0	Vladimir Belujsky	TKO	8 (8), 1:18	3 Dec 2022	Tottenham Hotspur Stadium, London, England	
8	Win	8–0	Michal Gazdik	TKO	4 (6), 0:50	16 Jul 2022	Copper Box Arena, London, England	
7	Win	7–0	Michal Ciach	TKO	2 (4), 2:27	23 Apr 2022	Wembley Stadium, London, England	
6	Win	6–0	Jiri Kroupa	TKO	3 (6), 1:36	11 Mar 2022	York Hall, London, England	
5	Win	5–0	Tamas Laska	TKO	1 (6), 1:11	4 Dec 2021	Copper Box Arena, London, England	
4	Win	4–0	Darryl Sharp	PTS	4	10 Sep 2021	Copper Box Arena, London, England	
3	Win	3–0	Tim Ventrella	TKO	2 (4), 2:30	10 Jul 2021	Royal Albert Hall, London, England	
2	Win	2–0	Ryan Hibbert	TKO	1 (4), 1:58	24 Apr 2021	York Hall, London, England	
1	Win	1–0	Lewis Van Poetsch	PTS	4	5 Dec 2020	Church House, London, England	
