= Asa Stevens =

American boxer

Personal information
- Born: November 27, 2000 (age 25) Waianae, Hawaii, U.S.
- Height: 5 ft 5 in (165 cm)
- Weight: Bantamweight

Boxing career
- Stance: Southpaw

Boxing record
- Total fights: 1
- Wins: 1
- Win by KO: 0
- Losses: 0
Medal record
Men's amateur boxing
Representing United States
Youth World Championships
Gold medal – first place	2018 Budapest	Flyweight
U.S. National Golden Gloves
Gold medal – first place	2019 Chattanooga	Bantamweight

Asa Stevens (born November 27, 2000) is an American professional boxer. As an amateur he won gold medals at the 2018 Youth World Championships and 2019 U.S. National Golden Gloves.

== Professional boxing record ==
6 fights	6 wins	0 losses
By decision	6	0

No.	Result	Record	Opponent	Type	Round, time	Date	Location	Notes
1	Win	1–0	(Mexico) Francisco Bonilla	UD	4	Jan 2, 2021	(United States) American Airlines Center, Dallas, Texas, U.S.	
