= Emiliano Vargas =

American boxer (born 2004)

Personal information
- Nickname: El General
- Nationality: American
- Born: April 16, 2004 (age 22) Oxnard, California, U.S.
- Height: 5 ft 9 in (175 cm)
- Weight: Light-welterweight

Boxing career
- Stance: Orthodox

Boxing record
- Total fights: 18
- Wins: 18
- Win by KO: 15
- Losses: 0

Emiliano Vargas (born April 16, 2004) is an American professional boxer who competes in the light-welterweight division.

== Early life ==
Vargas was born in Oxnard, California to Martha and boxing legend Fernando Vargas. His two older brothers, Amado and Fernando Jr. are also professional boxers

== Amateur career ==
Vargas had a stellar amateur career, becoming a seven time national champion. He turned pro with a record of 110 wins and just 10 defeats.

== Professional career ==
Vargas made his pro debut on May 14, 2022, at The Forum in Inglewood where knocked out novice Mark Salgado in the first round. Soon after he was signed by Bob Arum's Top Rank He made his debut for Top Rank on the undercard of Janibek Alimkhanuly's WBO middleweight world title defence versus Denzel Bentley. Vargas brutally stopped his opponent Julio Martinez in the second round.

=== Vargas vs. Leon ===
Vargas faced Juan Leon on May 4, 2025, at the T-Mobile Arena in Las Vegas, Nevada, for a chance to claim the first belt of his career, the North American Boxing Federation Junior Super Lightweight title. Vargas dominated the fight, dropping Leon twice in the second round to secure a stoppage victory and win the first title of his pro career.

Vargas was named best prospect in boxing in 2025 by top boxing writer Dan Rafael, and was awarded The Ring magazine Prospect of the Year for 2025.

=== Vargas vs. Quintana ===
Vargas faced Argentine contender Agustin Ezequiel Quintana in the co-main event to lightweight unification bout Emanuel Navarrete vs. Eduardo Núñez at Desert Diamond Arena in Glendale, Arizona, on February 28, 2026. Despite Quintana showing great durability and having some success, Vargas made the referee pull him out at the end of the ninth round due to taking too many unanswered shots.

=== Vargas vs. Mills ===
Vargas fought Bryce Mills at the Barclays Center in New York City. He won by stoppage in the fourth round.

== Professional boxing record ==
18 fights	18 wins	0 losses
By knockout	15	0
By decision	3	0

No.	Result	Record	Opponent	Type	Round, time	Date	Location	Notes
18	Win	18–0	Bryce Mills	TKO	4 (10), 1:17	Jun 27, 2026	Barclays Center New York City, New York, U.S.	Retained WBC-NABF Junior and WBO Latino light welterweight titles; Won WBC-USNBC Silver light welterweight title
17	Win	17–0	Agustin Ezequiel Quintana	RTD	9 (10), 3:00	Feb 28, 2026	Desert Diamond Arena, Glendale, Arizona, U.S.	Retained WBC-NABF Junior and WBO Latino light welterweight titles
16	Win	16–0	Jonathan Montrel	UD	10	Nov 15, 2025	Arena Coliseo, San Luis Potosi, Mexico	Won vacant WBO Latino light welterweight title
15	Win	15–0	Alexander Espinoza	KO	1 (8), 0:42	Jul 26, 2025	The Theater at Madison Square Garden, New York City, New York, U.S.	Retained WBC-NABF Junior light welterweight title
14	Win	14–0	Juan Leon	TKO	2 (8), 1:40	May 4, 2025	T-Mobile Arena, Las Vegas, Nevada, U.S.	Won vacant WBC-NABF Junior light welterweight title
13	Win	13–0	Giovannie Gonzalez	TKO	2 (8), 2:06	Mar 29, 2025	Fontainebleau Las Vegas, Las Vegas, Nevada, U.S.	
12	Win	12–0	Larry Fryers	TKO	5 (8), 1:23	Sep 20, 2024	Desert Diamond Arena, Glendale, Arizona, U.S.	
11	Win	11–0	Jose Zaragoza	TKO	1 (8), 1:32	Jun 29, 2024	Knight Center Complex, Miami, Florida, U.S.	
10	Win	10–0	Angel Varela Urena	KO	6 (6), 1:01	May 18, 2024	Pechanga Arena, San Diego, California, U.S.	
9	Win	9–0	Nelson Hampton	UD	6	Mar 29, 2024	Desert Diamond Arena, Glendale, Arizona, U.S.	
8	Win	8–0	Brandon Mendoza	KO	2 (6), 0:57	Nov 16, 2023	T-Mobile Arena, Las Vegas, Nevada, U.S.	
7	Win	7–0	Alejandro Guardado	TKO	3 (6), 1:01	Sep 15, 2023	American Bank Center, Corpus Christi, Texas, U.S.	
6	Win	6–0	Jorge Luis Marquez Alvarado	TKO	2 (4), 2:17	Aug 12, 2023	Desert Diamond Arena, Glendale, Arizona, U.S.	
5	Win	5–0	Rafael Jasso	KO	2 (4), 1:41	May 20, 2023	MGM Grand Las Vegas, Las Vegas, Nevada, U.S.	
4	Win	4–0	Edgar Uvalle	KO	2 (4), 1:21	Apr 1, 2023	Hard Rock Hotel & Casino Tulsa, Tulsa, Oklahoma, U.S.	
3	Win	3–0	Francisco Duque	UD	4	Feb 3, 2023	Desert Diamond Arena, Glendale, Arizona, U.S.	
2	Win	2–0	Julio Martinez	KO	2 (4), 0:47	Nov 12, 2022	Big Punch Arena, Tijuana, U. S.	
1	Win	1–0	Mark Salgado	KO	1 (4), 2:09	May 14, 2022	The Forum, Inglewood, California, U.S.	
