= Efrain Esquivias Jr. =

American boxer

Personal information
- Born: Efrain Esquivias; July 5, 1983 (age 43) Carson, California, United States
- Height: 5 ft 7 in (168 cm)
- Weight: Super Bantamweight

Boxing career
- Reach: 70 in (178 cm)
- Stance: Orthodox

Boxing record
- Total fights: 25
- Wins: 17
- Win by KO: 10
- Losses: 7
- Draws: 1
- No contests: 0

Efrain Esquivias (born July 5, 1983) is an American professional boxer. He held the WBA Fedelatin super bantamweight title. Efrain is trained by five-time Trainer of the Year Freddie Roach at the Wild Card Boxing gym. He is of Mexican descent.

== Amateur career ==
In 2006 Esquivias won the bantamweight National Golden Gloves Championship.

== Professional career ==
On March 25, 2011, Esquivias beat the veteran John Alberto Molina to win the WBA Fedelatin Super Bantamweight Championship. However, on June 23, 2012, Esquivias lost to Rico Ramos by decision in 8 rounds.
