= Dick Menchaca =

American boxer

Richard Menchaca (January 1, 1922 – July 28, 2005), better known as Dick Menchaca, was a two-time Golden Gloves champion.

== Personal life ==
Dick Menchaca was born in Piedras Negras, Mexico. His family moved to Port Arthur, Texas at ten. It was in Port Arthur that he began boxing when he was thirteen.

Menchaca and his wife, Leola, are members of the Mexican Heritage Society, and he is a life member of the Elks.

== Career ==
In 1940, Menchaca became the first Texan to win the National Golden Gloves title. At 118 pounds, Menchaca was a bantamweight in the competition. Continuing his streak of firsts, he knocked out his opponent, Dick Byrd of Bloomington, Illinois, in the first round. Menchaca successfully defended his title in 1941.

He was selected to the U.S. Olympic boxing team in 1940, but the games were not held because of World War II. Instead, Menchaca boxed in the Army, becoming the champ of the European theatre.

He also won the American Red Cross boxing championship at England's Rainbow Corner Arena. Menchaca returned to Port Arthur following the war and began coaching boxing while working for Texaco.

He worked for Texaco for 35 years. For over 45 years, in his spare time, Menchaca has coached boxers for free, using donations to buy gloves and equipment for Menchaca's Boxing Academy in Port Arthur.

His students range in age from 12 to adult. Menchaca has also coached several pro fighters and a team of amateur boxers, junior and senior high school students.
