= Sicily =

Island in the Mediterranean, region of Italy

Sicily Sicilia
- Autonomous region
- Regione Siciliana
- Flag Coat of arms
- Anthem: Madreterra
- Coordinates: 37.5°N 14°E
- Country: Italy
- Capital: Palermo
- Provinces: Agrigento, Caltanissetta, Catania, Enna, Messina, Palermo, Ragusa, Syracuse, Trapani

Government
  - Type: Presidential system
  - President: Renato Schifani (FI)

Area
  - Total: 25,832.39 km^{2} (9,973.94 sq mi)

Population (2026)
  - Total: 4,775,194
  - Rank: 5th in Italy
  - Density: 184.8530/km^{2} (478.7670/sq mi)
- Demonyms: English: Sicilian; Italian: Siciliano (man); Italian: Siciliana (woman)

Citizenship
  - Italian: 96%

GDP
  - Total: €112.030 billion (2024)
  - Per capita: €23,403 (2024)
- Time zone: UTC+1 (CET)
  - Summer (DST): UTC+2 (CEST)
- ISO 3166 code: IT-82
- HDI (2022): 0.859 very high · 21st of 21
- NUTS Region: ITG
- Website: regione.sicilia.it

Sicily (Italian and Sicilian: Sicilia) (Note: Italian pronunciation: [siˈtʃiːlja]; Sicilian pronunciation: [sɪˈʃiːlja] or [sɪˈdʒiːlja].), officially the Sicilian Region, is an island in the central Mediterranean Sea and one of the twenty regions of Italy, situated south of the Italian Peninsula in continental Europe. With over 4.7 million inhabitants, including 1.2 million in and around the capital city of Palermo, it is both the largest and most populous island in the Mediterranean Sea.

Sicily's namesake is the Sicels, who inhabited the eastern part of the island during the Iron Age. Sicily has a rich and unique culture in arts, music, literature, cuisine, and architecture. Its most prominent landmark is Mount Etna, the tallest active volcano in Europe, and one of the most active in the world, currently 3,403 m (11,165 ft) high. The island has a typical Mediterranean climate. It is separated from Calabria by the Strait of Messina. It is one of the five Italian autonomous regions and is considered part of southern Italy.

The earliest archaeological record of human activity on the island dates to around 14,000 BC. By around 750 BC, Sicily had three Phoenician and around twelve Greek colonies along its coasts, becoming one of the centers of Magna Graecia. The Sicilian Wars of 580–265 BC were fought between the Carthaginians and Greeks, and the Punic Wars of 264–146 BC were fought between Rome and Carthage. The Roman province of Sicilia ended with the fall of the Roman Empire in the 5th century AD. Sicily was ruled during the Early Middle Ages by the Vandals, the Ostrogoths, the Byzantine Empire, and the Emirate of Sicily.

The Norman conquest of southern Italy led to the creation of the County of Sicily in 1071, which was succeeded by the Kingdom of Sicily in 1130. Following the Sicilian Vespers in 1282, Sicily was ruled by the Crown of Aragon and then the Monarchy of Spain, either in personal union with the crown or by a cadet branch, except for a brief period of Savoy and then Habsburg rule in 1713–1735. In 1816, the kingdom unified with the Kingdom of Naples to form the Kingdom of the Two Sicilies. Following the Expedition of the Thousand, an invasion led by Giuseppe Garibaldi, and a subsequent plebiscite, the island became part of the newly unified Italy in 1860. Sicily was given special status as an autonomous administrative division on 15 May 1946, 18 days before the 1946 Italian institutional referendum.

== Etymology ==
The name Sicilia was given to the Roman province in 241 BC. It is named after the Sicels, who inhabited the eastern part of the island during the Iron Age. The ancient name of the island is Trinacria (Greek Τρινακρία "having three headlands") for its triangular shape, likely a re-interpretation of earlier (Homeric) Thrinacia. The Greek name was rendered as Trīnācrĭa in classical Latin (Virgil, Ovid).

== History ==
=== Prehistory ===
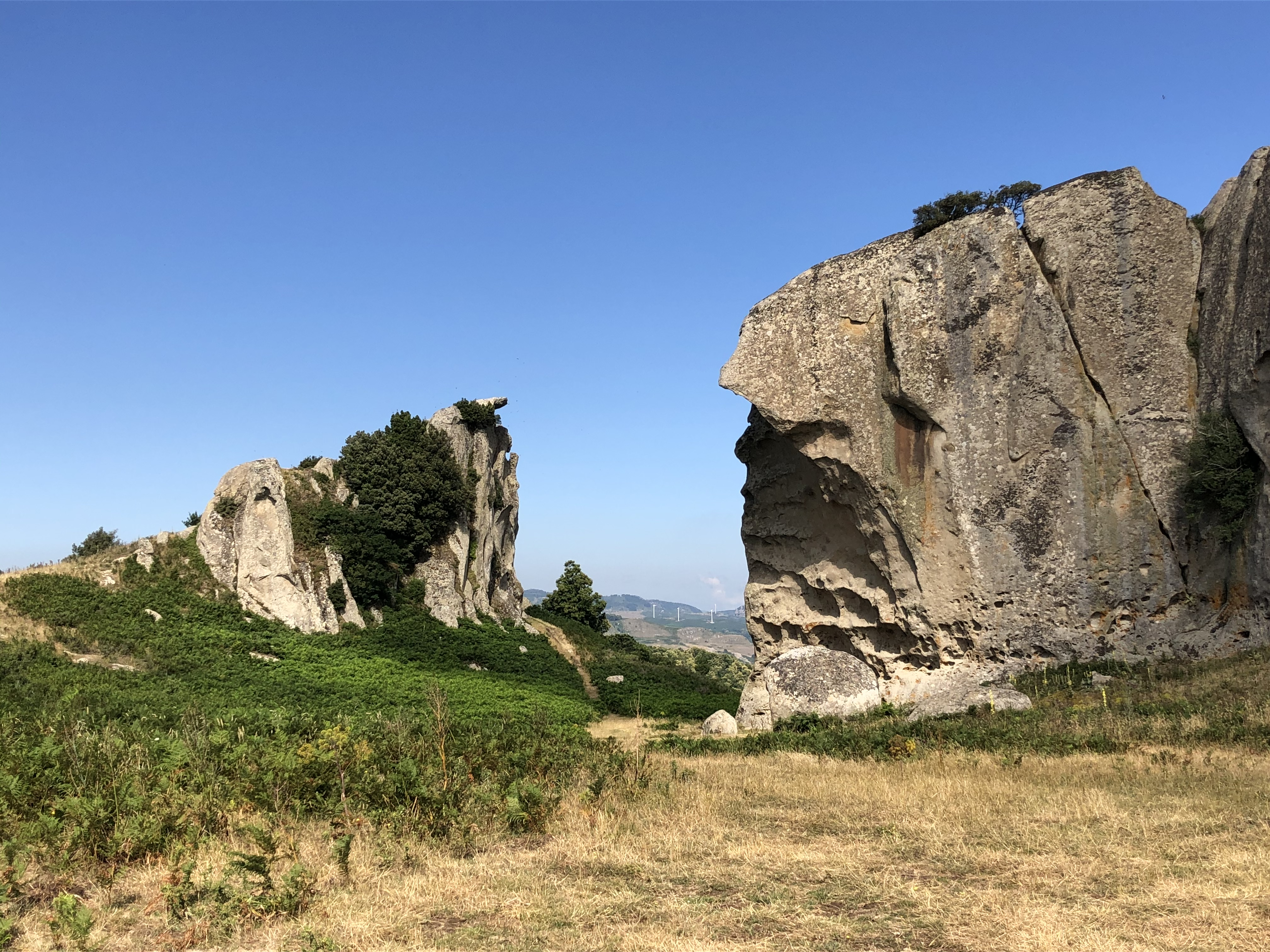
Megaliths of Argimusco, Montalbano Elicona

Humans first colonized Sicily towards the end of the Late Pleistocene, around 16,000 years ago, by people associated with the Epigravettian culture.

Discoveries of dolmens on the island (dating to the second half of the third millennium BC) seem to offer new insights into the culture of primitive Sicily. The impact of at least two influences is clear: the European one coming from the Northwest, and the Mediterranean influence of an eastern heritage.

=== Antiquity ===
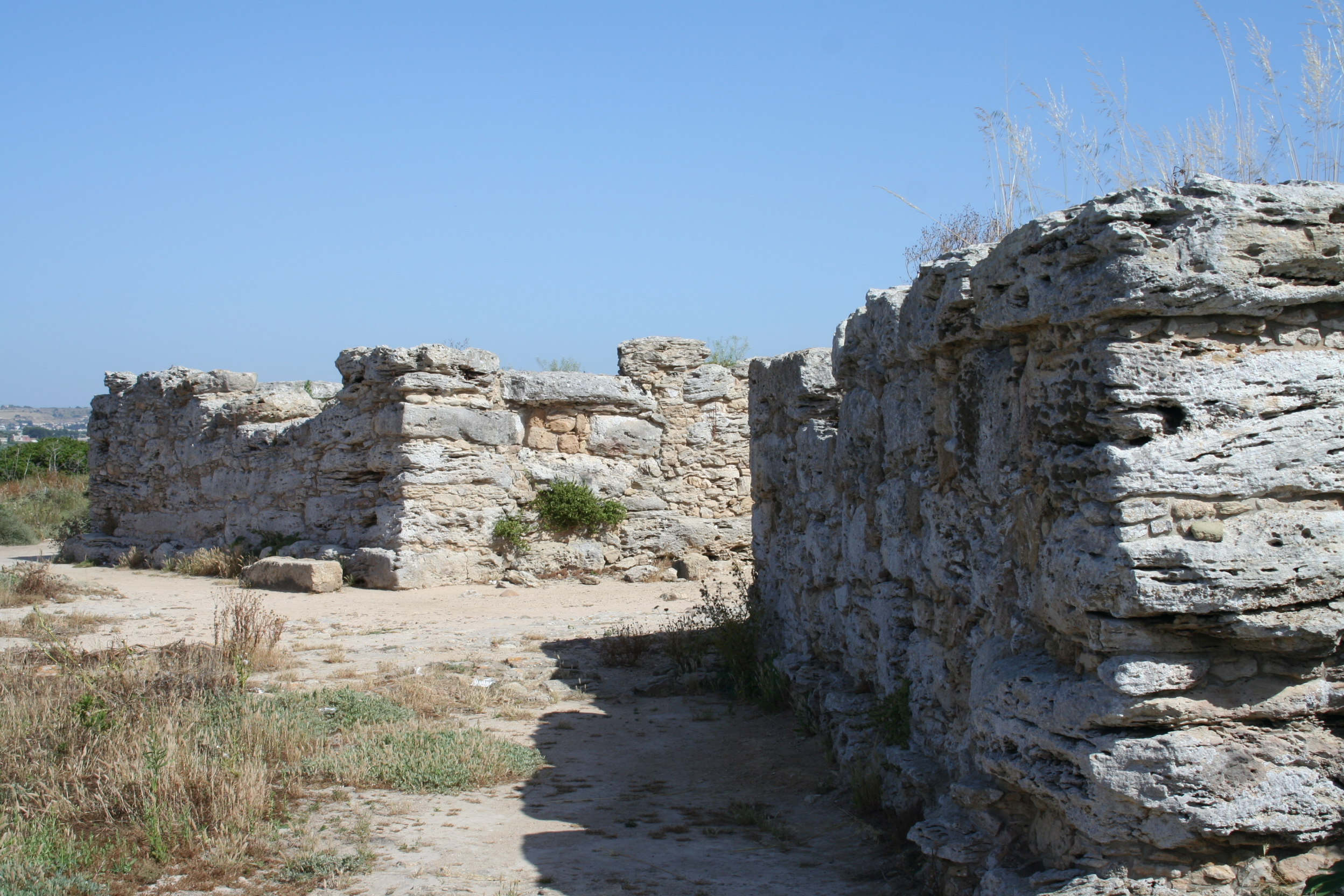
Ruins of the ancient Phoenician city of Motya

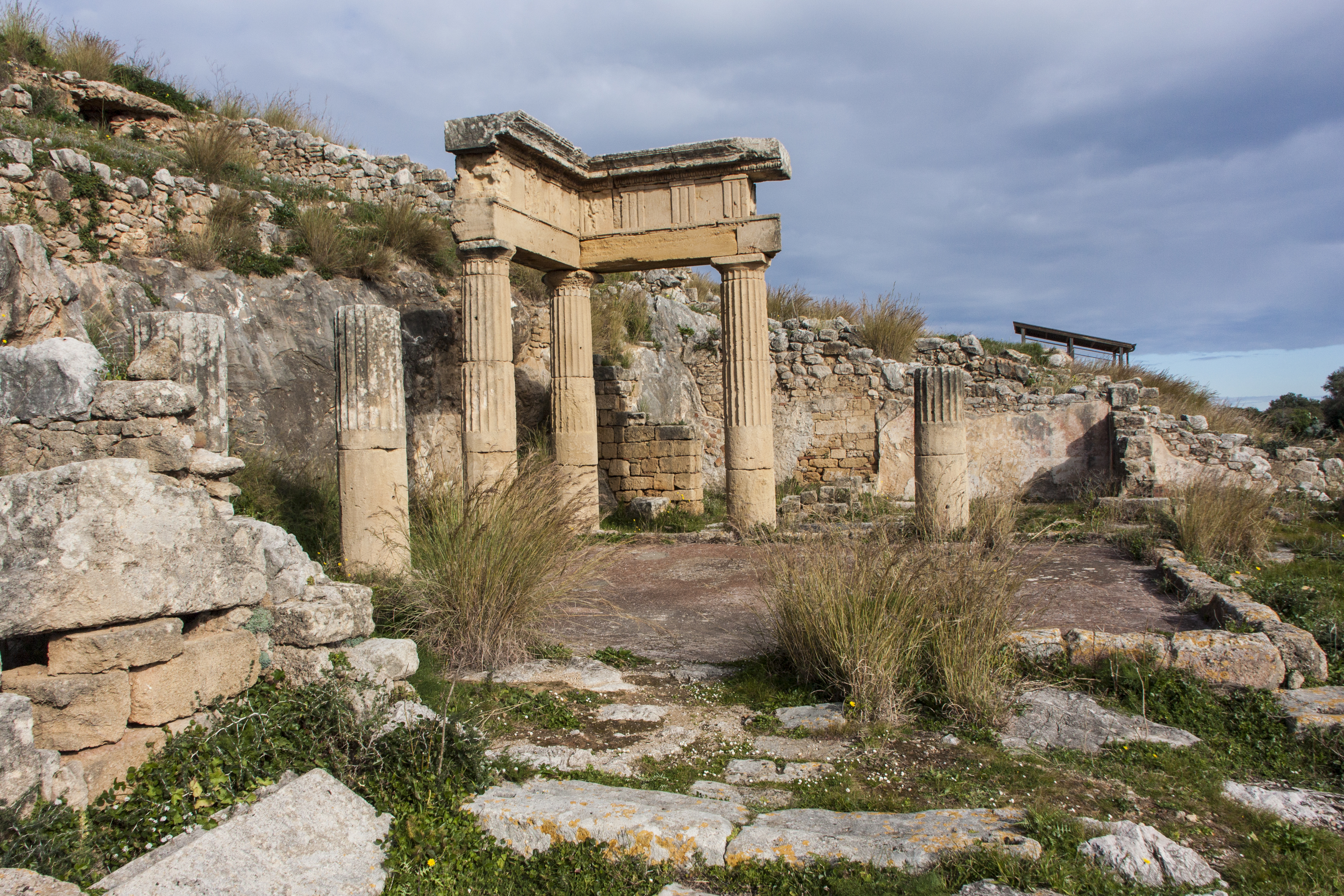
Ruins of the ancient Carthaginian city of Soluntum

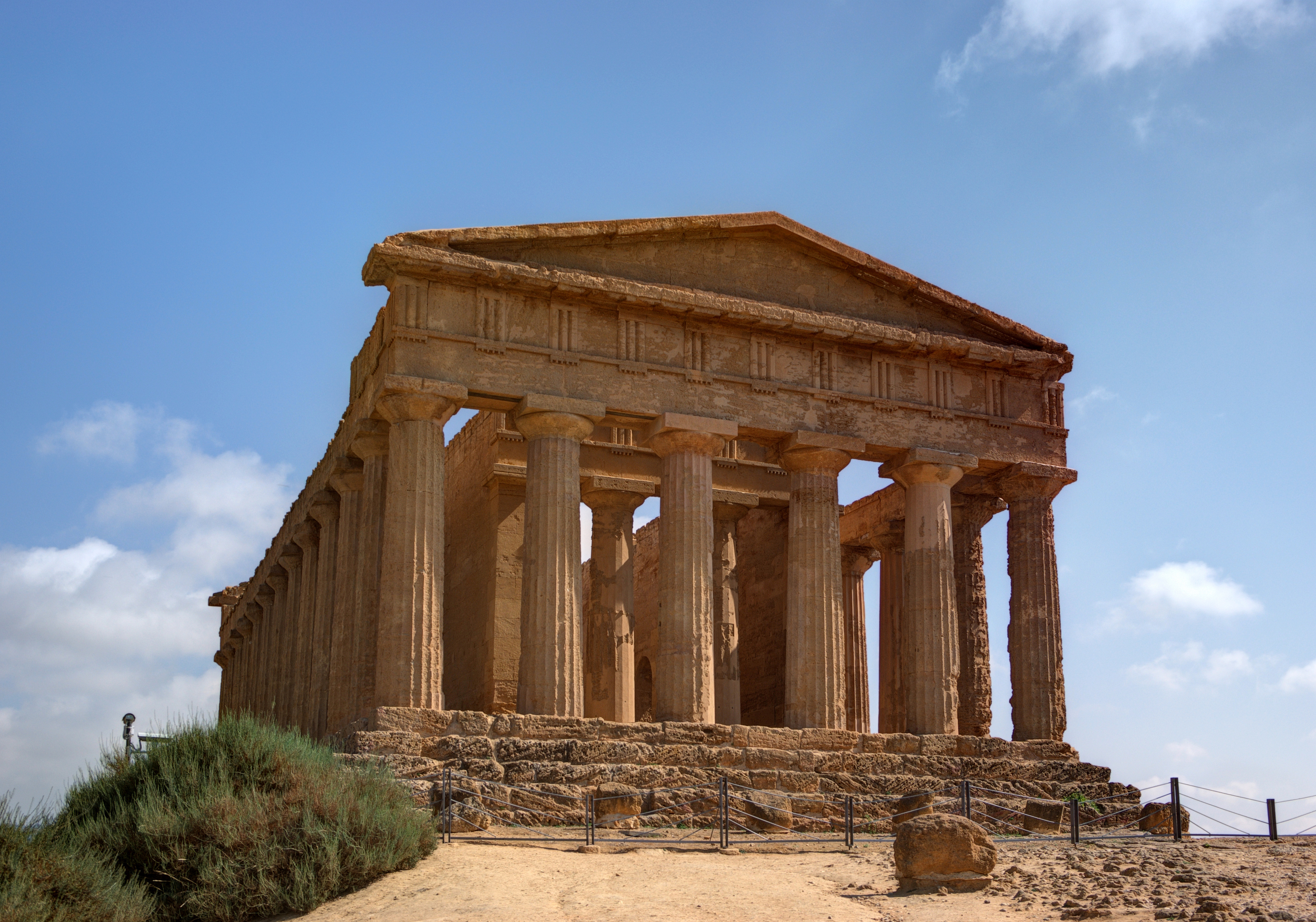
Temple of Concordia, Valle dei Templi, an archaeological site in Agrigento. It is one of the most outstanding examples of ancient Greek art and architecture of Magna Graecia.

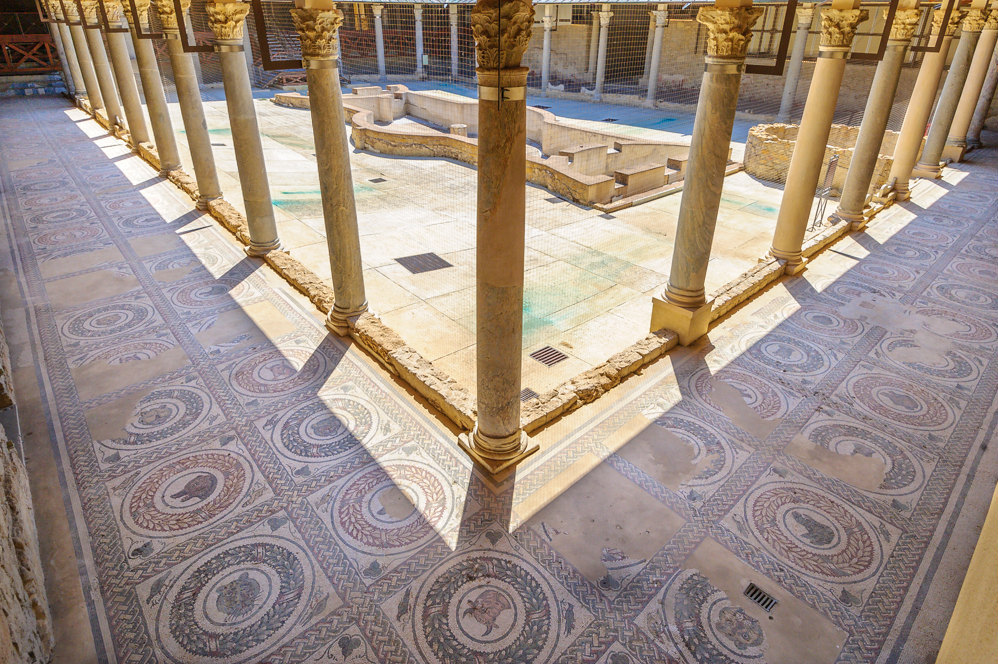
Villa Romana del Casale, a large and elaborate Roman villa or palace located about 3 km from the town of Piazza Armerina

The original classical-era inhabitants of Sicily comprised three defined groups of the ancient peoples of Italy: the Sicani, the Elymians and the Sicels. The most prominent and by far the earliest of these were the Sicani, who (Thucydides writes) arrived from the Iberian Peninsula (perhaps Catalonia). Some modern scholars, however, suggest classifying the Sicani as possibly an Illyrian tribe. Important historical evidence has been discovered in the form of cave drawings by the Sicani, dated from the end of the Pleistocene epoch around 8000 BC. The Elymians, thought to have come from the area of the Aegean Sea, became the next tribe to join the Sicanians on Sicily.

No evidence survives of warring between tribes, but the Sicanians moved eastwards when the Elymians settled in the northwest corner of the island. The Sicels are thought to have originated in Liguria; they arrived from mainland Italy in 1200 BC and forced the Sicanians to move back across Sicily and to settle in the middle of the island. Other minor Italic groups who settled in Sicily included the Ausones (Aeolian Islands, Milazzo) and the Morgetes of Morgantina.

The Phoenician settlements in the western part of the island predate the arrival of Greek colonists. From about 750 BC, the Greeks began to live in Sicily (Ancient Greek: Σικελία – Sikelia), establishing many significant settlements. The most important colony was in Syracuse; others grew up at Akragas, Selinunte, Gela, Himera and Zancle. The native Sicani and Sicel peoples became absorbed into the Hellenic culture with relative ease, and the area became part of Magna Graecia along with the coasts of the south of the Italian peninsula, which the Greeks had also colonised. Sicily had fertile soils, and the successful introduction of olives and grape vines fostered profitable trading. Greek culture significantly centered around Greek religion, and the settlers built many temples throughout Sicily, including several in the Valley of the Temples at Agrigento.

Politics on the island became intertwined with those of Greece; Syracuse became desired by the Athenians who set out on the Sicilian Expedition (415–413 BC) during the Peloponnesian War. Syracuse gained Sparta and Corinth as allies and, as a result, defeated the Athenian expedition. The victors destroyed the Athenian army and their ships, selling most of the survivors into slavery.

The Greek kingdom of Syracuse controlled most of eastern Sicily while Carthage controlled the western side. The two cultures began to clash, leading to the Greek-Punic wars (between 580 and 265 BC). The Greek states had begun to make peace with the Roman Republic in 205 BC, before the Romans sought to annex Sicily as their republic's first province. Rome attacked Carthage's holdings in Sicily in the First Punic War (264 to 241 BC) and won, making Sicily–with the exception of Syracuse–the first Roman province outside of the Italian Peninsula by 242 BC.

In the Second Punic War (218 to 201 BC), the Carthaginians attempted to recapture Sicily. Some of the Greek cities on the island who were loyal to Rome switched sides to help the Carthaginians, prompting a Roman military response. Archimedes, who lived in Syracuse, helped defend his city from Roman invasion; Roman troops killed him after they captured Syracuse in 212 BC. The Carthaginian attempt failed, and Rome became more unrelenting in its annihilation of the invaders; Roman consul M. Valerian told the Roman Senate in 210 BC that "no Carthaginian remains in Sicily".

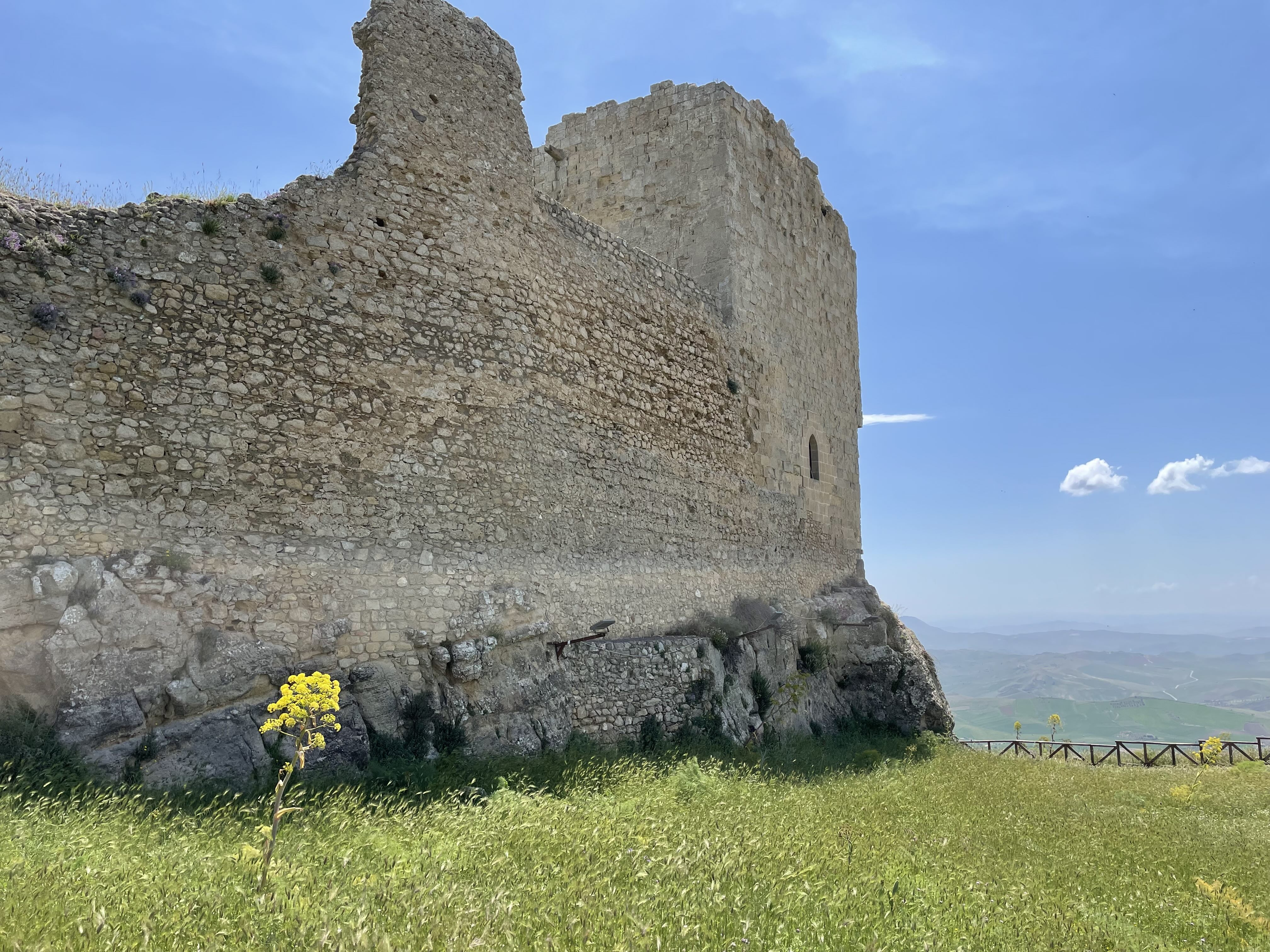
A 10th century castle built by the Muslims in Sicily on the mountain top of the mountain in Agira in central Sicily.

As the Roman Republic's granary, Sicily ranked as an important province, divided into two quaestorships: Syracuse to the east and Lilybaeum to the west. Roman rule introduced the Latin language to the island, which underwent a slow process of latinisation but Sicilian culture remained largely Greek and the Greek language did not become extinct on the island, facilitating its re-hellenisation much later under the Byzantines. The prosperity of the island went into sharp decline during the governorship of Verres (73 to 71 BC). In 70 BC, the noted statesman Cicero condemned the misgovernment of Verres in his oration In Verrem.

Various groups used the island as a power base at different times: slave insurgents occupied it during the First (135−132 BC) and Second (104−100 BC) Servile Wars. Sextus Pompey had his headquarters there during the Sicilian revolt of 44 to 36 BC. Christianity first appeared in Sicily during the years following AD 200; between this time and AD 313, when Emperor Constantine the Great lifted the prohibition on Christianity, a significant number of Sicilians had become martyrs, including Agatha, Christina, Lucy, and Euplius. Sicily remained a Roman province for around 700 years.

=== Roman and Germanic viceregal rule (469–535) ===
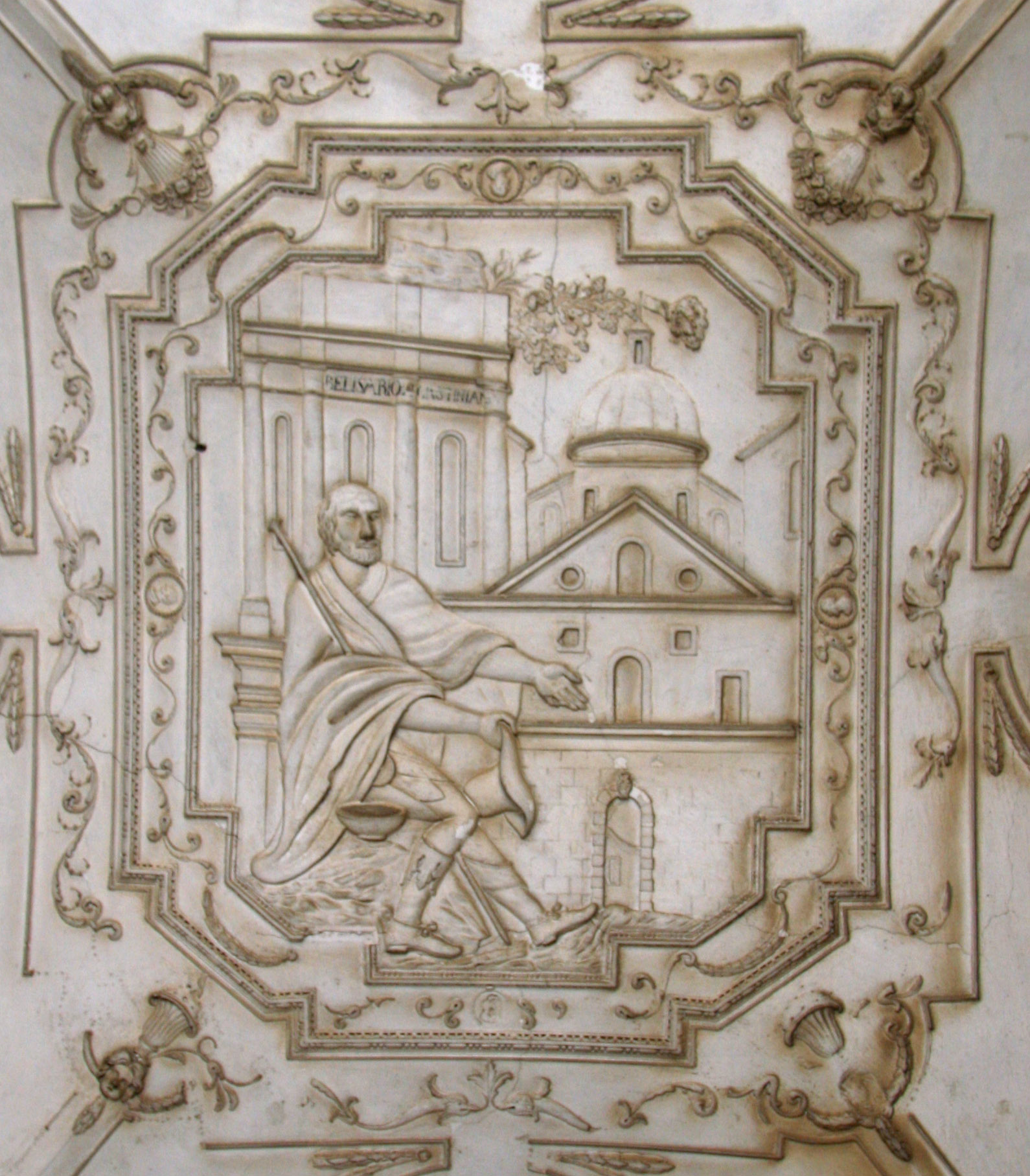
Belisarius in Syracuse

The Western Roman Empire began falling apart after the invasion of Vandals, Alans, and Sueves across the Rhine on the last day of 406. Eventually the Vandals, after roaming about western and southern Hispania (present-day Iberia) for 20 years, moved to North Africa in 429 and occupied Carthage in 439. The Franks moved south from present-day Belgium. The Visigoths moved west and eventually settled in Aquitaine in 418; the Burgundians were settled in present-day Savoy in 443.

The Vandals found themselves in a position to threaten Sicily – only 100 miles away from their North African bases. After taking Carthage, the Vandals, personally led by King Gaiseric, laid siege to Palermo in 440 as the opening act in an attempt to wrest the island from Roman rule. The Vandals made another attempt to take the island one year after the 455 sack of Rome, at Agrigento, but were defeated decisively by Ricimir in a naval victory off Corsica in 456. The island remained under Roman rule until 469. The Vandals lost possession of the island 7 years later in 476 to the East Germanic tribe of the Ostrogoths, who then controlled Italy and Dalmatia. The island was granted by the Vandal king Geiseric to Odoacer, the ruler of Italy, in exchange for the payment of tribute. The Vandals kept a small part of the island, probably at the western end and centred on Lilybaeum. They lost this in 491 after making one last attempt to conquer the island from this port. The Ostrogothic conquest of Sicily (and of Italy as a whole) under Theodoric the Great began in 488. The Byzantine Emperor Zeno had appointed Theodoric as a military commander in Italy. The Goths were Germanic, but Theodoric fostered Roman culture and government and allowed freedom of religion. In 461, from the age of seven or eight until 17 or 18, Theodoric had become a Byzantine hostage; he resided in the great palace of Constantinople, was favoured by Emperor Leo I (r. 457–474) and learned to read, write and do arithmetic.

=== Byzantine period (535–827) ===
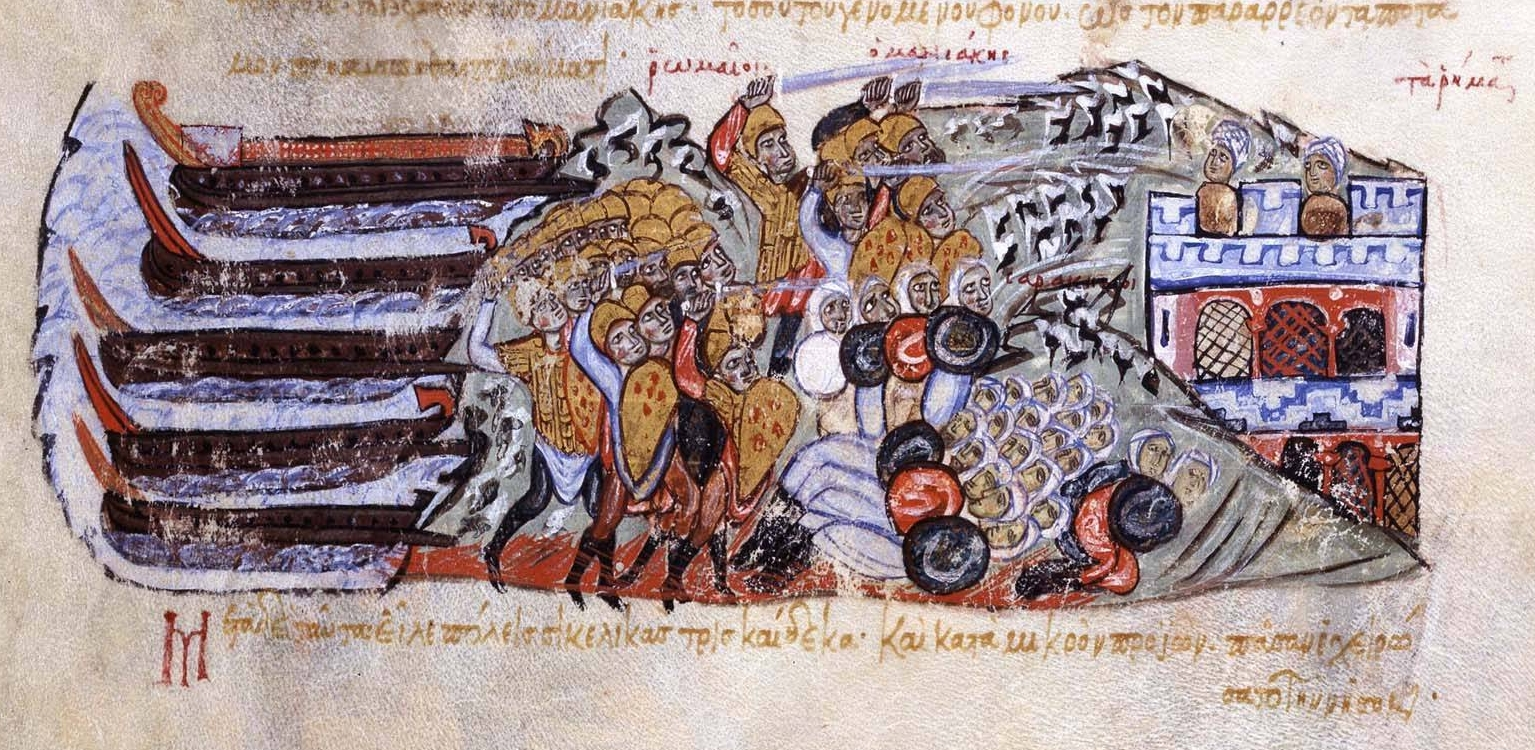
Image depicting the Byzantine army landing in Sicily commanded by George Maniaces

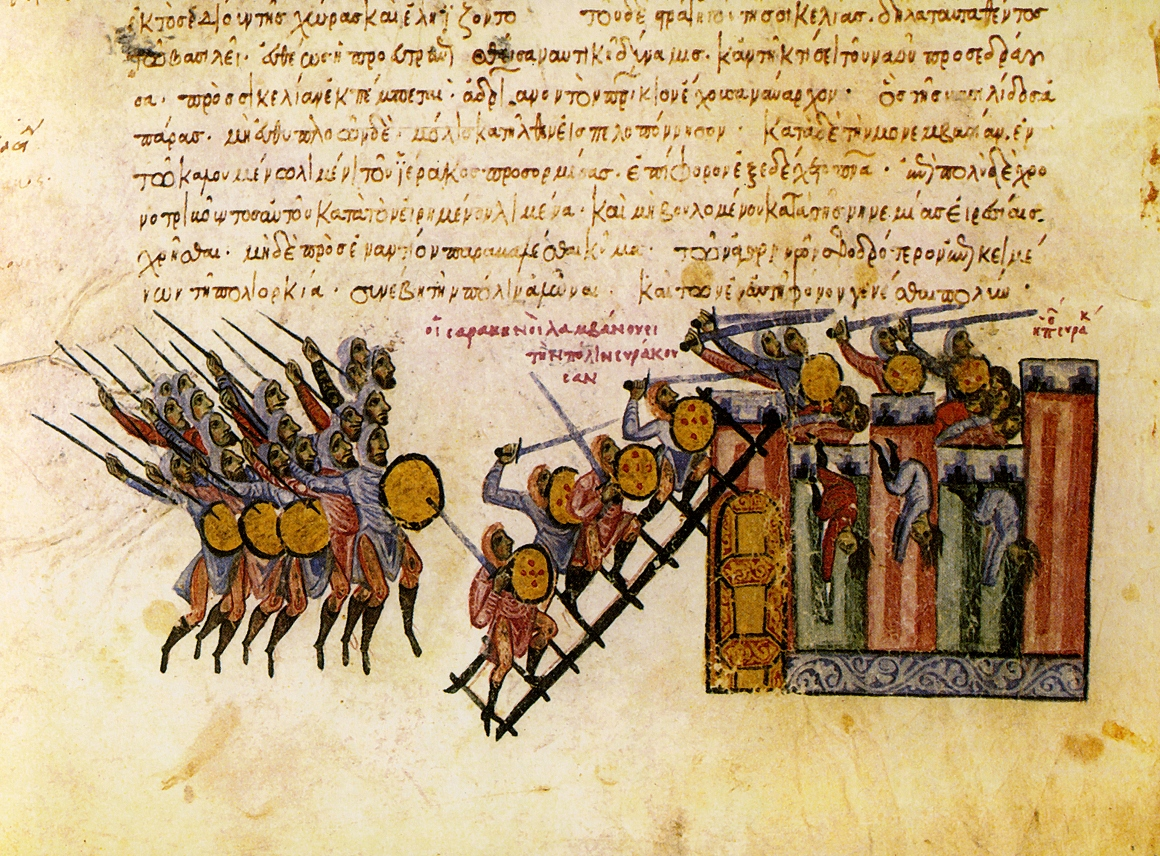
The Saracen conquest of the Byzantine stronghold Syracuse, Siege of Syracuse (877–878)

After taking areas occupied by the Vandals in North Africa, Justinian I retook Italy as an ambitious attempt to recover the lost provinces in the West. The re-conquests marked an end to over 150 years of accommodating policies with tribal invaders. His first target was Sicily, leading to the Gothic War (535–554) between the Ostrogoths and the Eastern Roman Empire, also known as the Byzantine Empire. Justinian's general Belisarius was assigned to the military task. Sicily was used as a base for the Byzantines to conquer the rest of Italy, including Naples, Rome, and Milan. It took five years before the Ostrogoth capital Ravenna fell in 540. However, the new Ostrogoth king Totila counterattacked, moving down the Italian peninsula, plundering and conquering Sicily in 550. Totila was defeated and killed in the Battle of Taginae by Byzantine general Narses in 552 but Italy was in ruins.

At the time of the reconquest Greek was still the predominant language spoken on the island. Sicily was invaded by the Arab forces of Caliph Uthman in 652, but the Arabs failed to make permanent gains. They returned to Syria with their booty. Raids seeking loot continued until the mid-8th century.

The Eastern Roman Emperor Constans II moved from Constantinople to Syracuse in 660. The following year he launched an assault from Sicily against the Lombard Duchy of Benevento, which occupied most of southern Italy. Rumors that the capital of the empire was to be moved to Syracuse probably cost Constans his life, as he was assassinated in 668. His son Constantine IV succeeded him. A brief usurpation in Sicily by Mezezius was quickly suppressed by this emperor. Contemporary accounts report that the Greek language was widely spoken on the island during this period. In 740 Emperor Leo III the Isaurian transferred Sicily from the jurisdiction of the church of Rome to that of Constantinople, placing the island within the eastern branch of the Church.

In 826 Euphemius, the Byzantine commander in Sicily, having apparently killed his wife, forced a nun to marry him. Emperor Michael II caught wind of the matter and ordered general Constantine to end the marriage and cut off Euphemius' head. Euphemius rose up, killed Constantine, and then occupied Syracuse; he, in turn, was defeated and driven out to North Africa. He offered the rule of Sicily to Ziyadat Allah, the Aghlabid Emir of Tunisia, in return for a position as a general and a place of safety. A Muslim army was then sent to the island consisting of Arabs, Berbers, Cretans, and Persians.

The Muslim conquest of Sicily was a see-saw affair and met with fierce resistance. It took over a century for Byzantine Sicily to be conquered; the largest city, Syracuse, held out until 878 and the Greek city of Taormina fell in 902. It was not until 965 that all of Sicily was conquered by the Arabs. In the 11th-century Byzantine armies carried out a partial reconquest of the island under George Maniakes, but it was their Norman mercenaries who would eventually complete the island's reconquest at the end of the century.

=== Arab period (827–1091) ===
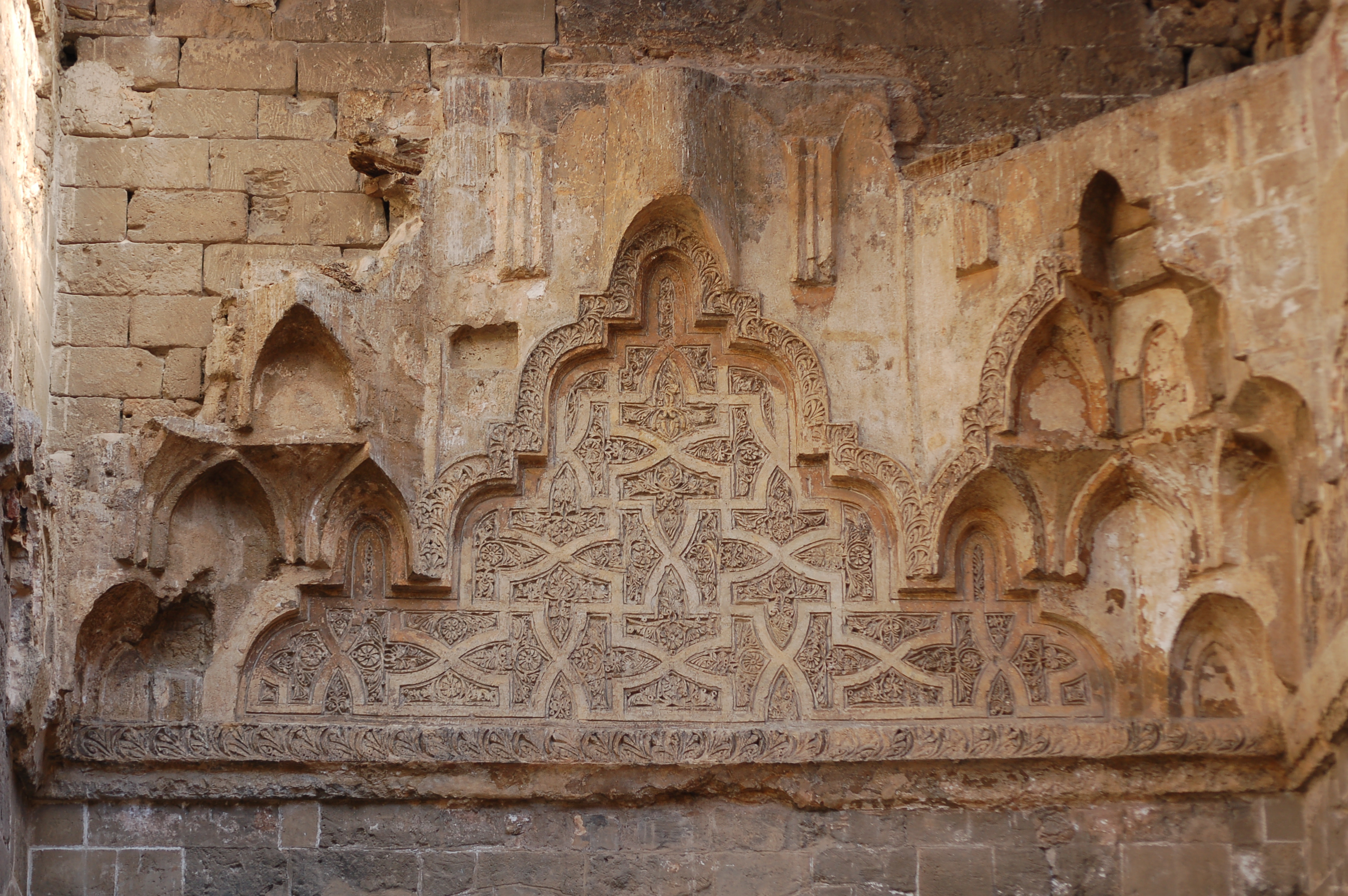
Arabesque on a wall in the Cuba Palace in Palermo

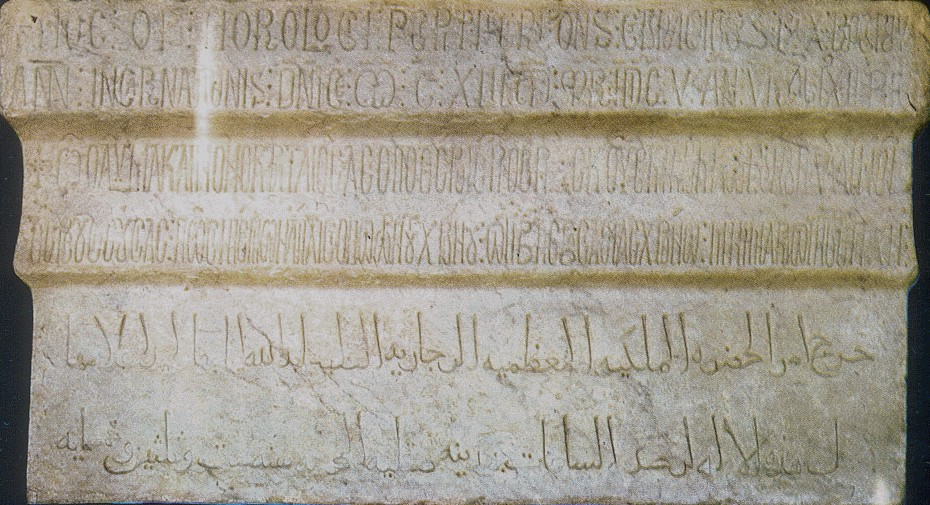
Trilingual sign from the Palazzo dei Normanni in Palermo, written in Latin, Byzantine Greek and Arabic

The language spoken in Sicily under Arab rule was Siculo-Arabic and Arabic influence is present in some Sicilian words today. Although long extinct in Sicily, the language has developed into what is now the Maltese language on the islands of Malta today.

A description of Palermo was given by Ibn Hawqal, an Arab merchant who visited Sicily in 950. A walled suburb, called the Al-Kasr (the palace), is the centre of Palermo to this day, with the great Friday mosque on the site of the later Roman cathedral. The suburb of al-Khalisa (modern Kalsa) contained the Sultan's palace, baths, a mosque, government offices, and a private prison. Ibn Hawqal estimated there were 7,000 butchers trading in 150 shops. The Muslim rule introduced lemons, oranges, pistachios, and sugar cane, as well as cotton and mulberries for sericulture, and introduced the Qanat to improve irrigation systems for agriculture. Around 1050, the western half of Sicily was ethnically and culturally distinct from central and eastern Sicily. During this time, there was also a small Jewish presence in Sicily, evidence seen in the catacombs discovered on the island.

Palermo was initially ruled by the Aghlabids; later it was the centre of the Emirate of Sicily, which was under the nominal suzerainty of the Fatimid Caliphate. Muslim sovereignty was never absolute across the island, and the creation of three subdivisions served to distinguish different approaches to government. Under the Arab rule the island was divided in three administrative regions, or "vals", roughly corresponding to the three "points" of Sicily: Val di Mazara in the west; Val Demone in the northeast; and Val di Noto in the southeast. Western Sicily was more Islamized and heavily populated by Arabs, allowing for full and direct administration; by contrast, the northeast region of Val Demone remained majority Christian and often resistant to Muslim rule, prompting a focus on tax collection and maintaining public order, as a result, revolts by Byzantine Sicilians continuously occurred in the east where Greek-speaking Christians predominated. Parts of the island were re-occupied before revolts were quashed. By the 11th century, the Emirate of Sicily began to fragment as intra-dynastic quarrelling fractured the Muslim government.

=== Norman Sicily (1038–1198) ===
The Norman Kingdom of Sicily (in green) in 1154, upon the death of Roger II

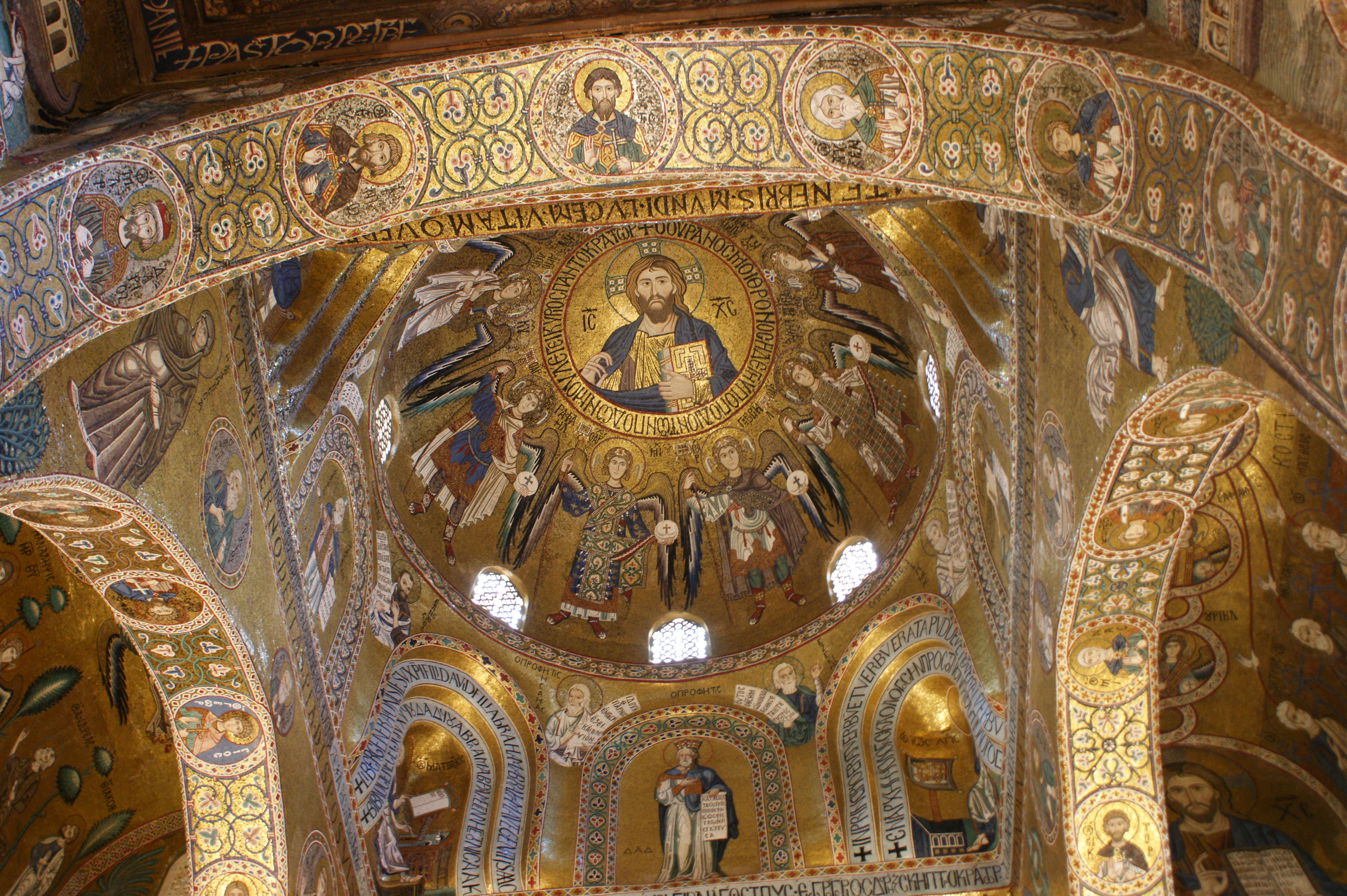
Cappella Palatina, Palermo

In 1038, seventy years after losing their last cities in Sicily, the Byzantines under the Greek general George Maniakes invaded the island together with their Varangian and Norman mercenaries. Maniakes was killed in a Byzantine civil war in 1043 before completing a reconquest and the Byzantines withdrew. Later the Normans invaded in 1061 and after taking Apulia and Calabria, Roger I occupied Messina with an army of 700 knights. In 1068, Roger I was victorious at Misilmeri. Most crucial was the siege of Palermo, whose fall in 1071 eventually resulted in all Sicily coming under Norman control. The conquest was completed in 1091 when they captured Noto the last Arab stronghold. Palermo continued to be the capital under the Normans. The Normans formed a small but violent ruling class. They destroyed many of the Arab towns in Sicily, and very few physical remains survive from the Arab era.

The Norman Hauteville family appreciated and admired the rich and layered culture in which they now found themselves. They also introduced into Sicily their own culture, customs, and politics from Normandy. Many Normans in Sicily adopted the habits and comportment of Muslim rulers and their Byzantine subjects in dress, language, literature, even to the extent of having palace eunuchs and, according to some accounts, a harem.

While Roger I died in 1101, his wife Adelaide ruled until 1112 when their son Roger II of Sicily came of age. Having succeeded his brother Simon as Count of Sicily, Roger II was ultimately able to raise the status of the island to a kingdom in 1130, along with his other holdings, which included the Maltese Islands and the Duchies of Apulia and Calabria. Roger II appointed the powerful Greek George of Antioch to be his "emir of emirs" and continued the syncretism of his father. During this period, the Kingdom of Sicily was prosperous and politically powerful, becoming one of the wealthiest states in all of Europe—even wealthier than the Kingdom of England.

The court of Roger II became the most luminous centre of culture in the Mediterranean, both from Europe and the Middle East, like the multi-ethnic Caliphate of Córdoba, then only just eclipsed. This attracted scholars, scientists, poets, artists, and artisans of all kinds. Laws were issued in the language of the community to whom they were addressed in Norman Sicily, at the time when the culture was still heavily Arab and Greek. Governance was by rule of law which promoted justice. Muslims, Jews, Byzantine Greeks, Lombards, and Normans worked together fairly amicably. During this time many extraordinary buildings were constructed.

However this situation changed as the Normans imported immigrants from Normandy, England, Lombardy, Piedmont, Provence and Campania to secure the island. Linguistically, the island shifted from being one-third Greek- and two-thirds Arabic-speaking at the time of the Norman conquest to becoming fully Latinised. In terms of religion the island became completely Roman Catholic (bearing in mind that until 1054 the Churches owing allegiance to the Pope and the Patriarch of Constantinople belonged to one Church); Sicily before the Norman conquest was under the Eastern Orthodox Patriarch. After Pope Innocent III made him Papal Legate in 1098, Roger I created several Catholic bishoprics while still allowing the construction of 12 Greek-speaking monasteries (the Greek language, monasteries, and 1500 parishes continued to exist until the adherents of the Greek Rite were forced in 1585 to convert to Catholicism or leave; a small pocket of Greek-speakers still live in Messina).

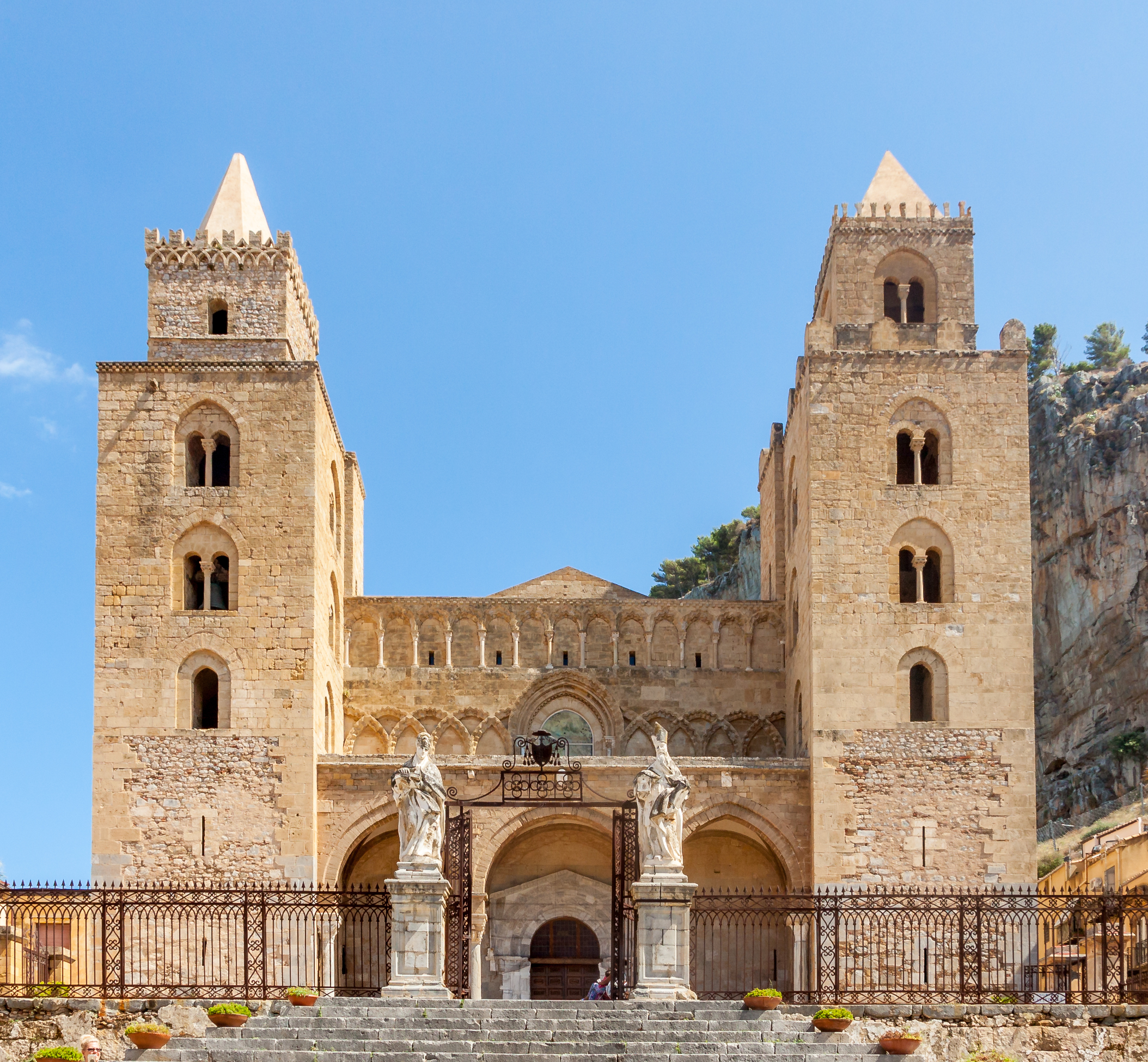
The Cefalù Cathedral

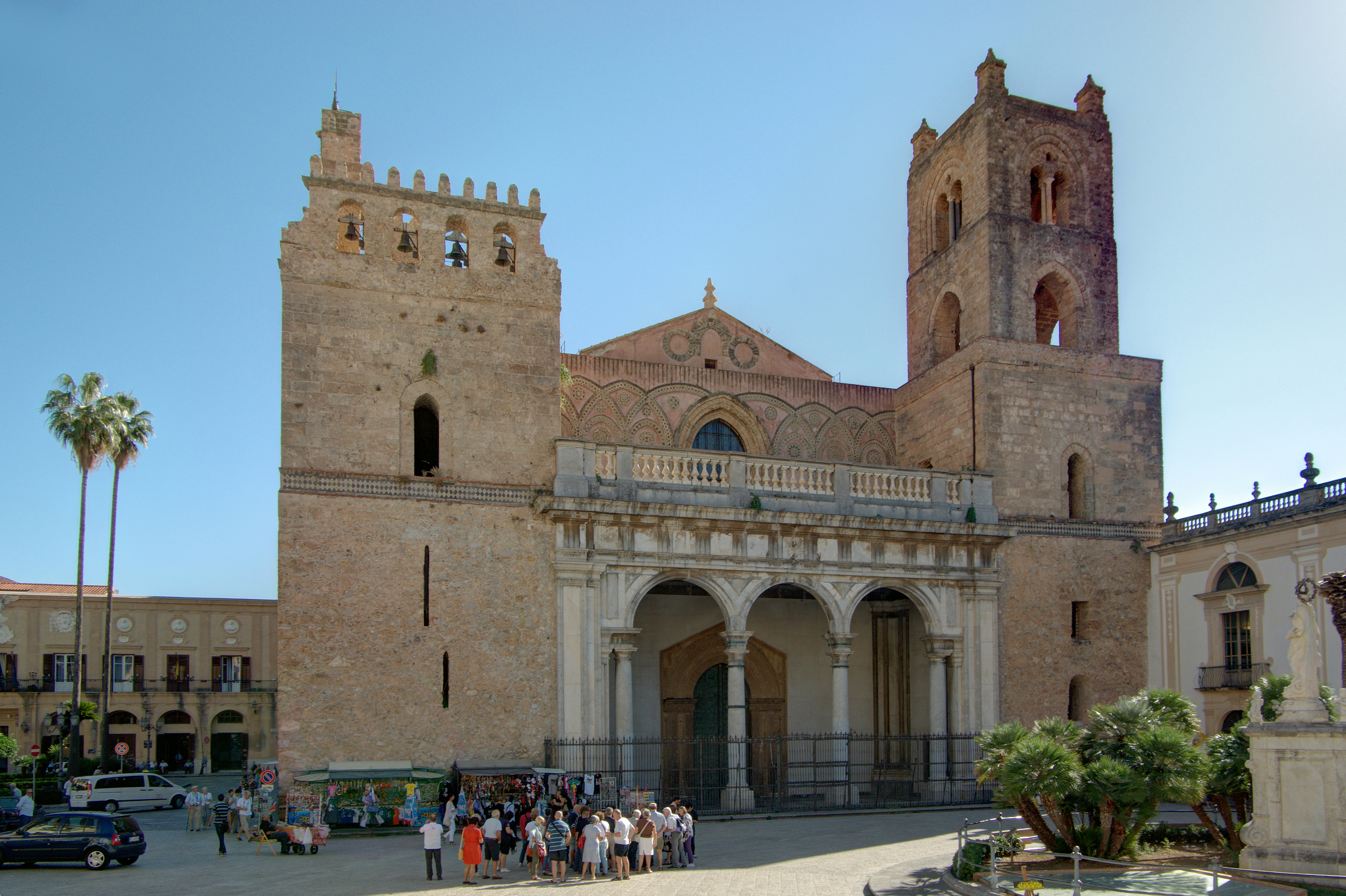
The Cathedral of Monreale

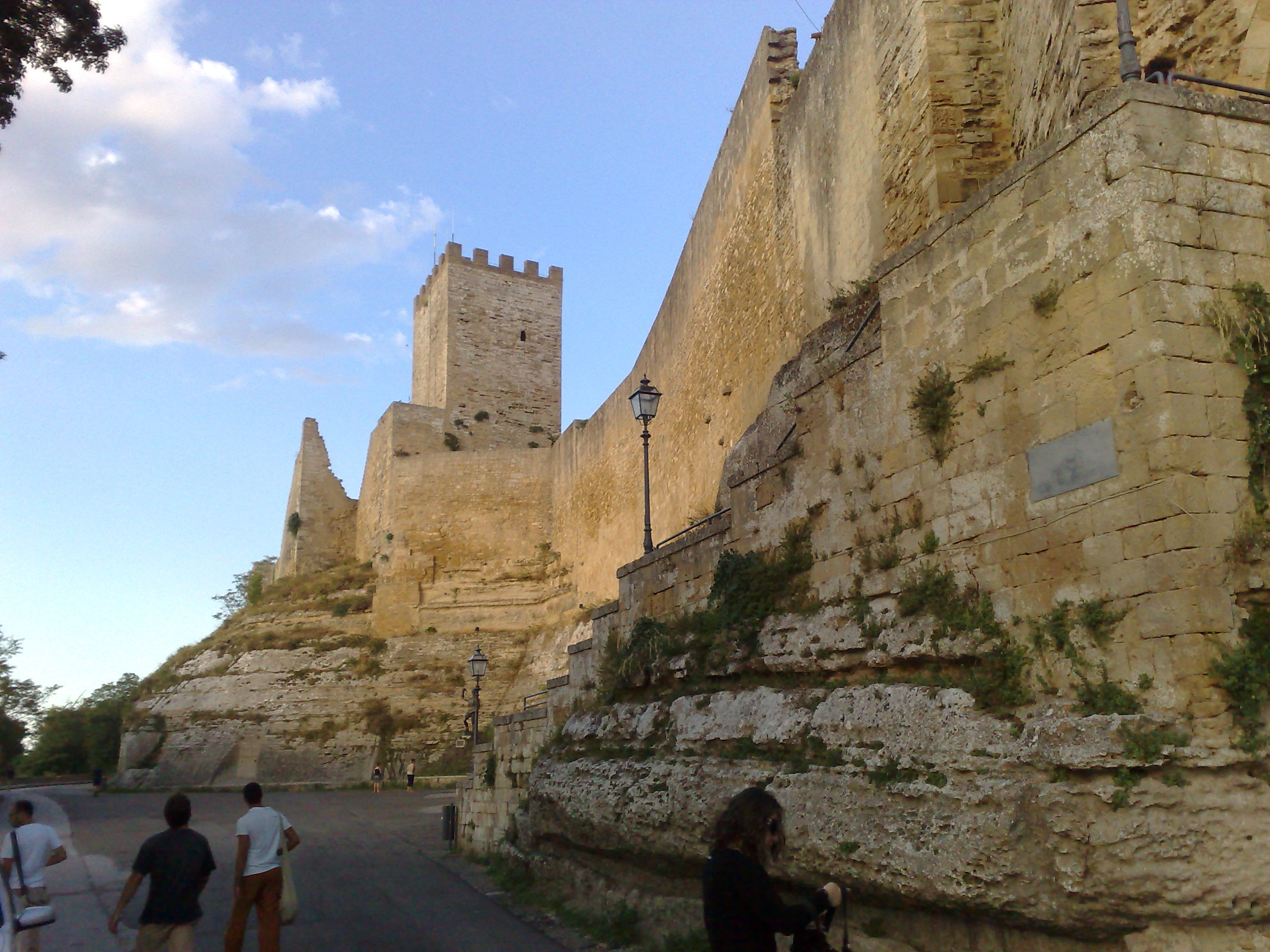
The Castello di Lombardia, a Norman castle at Enna

=== Kingdom of Sicily (1198–1860) ===
After a century, the Norman Hauteville dynasty died out; the last direct descendant and heir of Roger II, Constance, married Emperor Henry VI. This eventually led to the crown of Sicily being passed to the Hohenstaufen dynasty, who were Germans from Swabia. The last of the Hohenstaufens, Frederick II, the only son of Constance, was one of the greatest and most cultured men of the Middle Ages. His mother's will had asked Pope Innocent III to undertake the guardianship of her son. Frederick was four when at Palermo, he was crowned King of Sicily in 1198. Frederick received no systematic education and was allowed to run free in the streets of Palermo. There he picked up the many languages he heard spoken, such as Arabic and Greek, and learned some of the lore of the Jewish community. At age twelve, he dismissed Innocent's deputy regent and took over the government; at fifteen he married Constance of Aragon, and began his reclamation of the imperial crown. Subsequently, due to Muslim rebellions, Frederick II destroyed the remaining Muslim presence in Sicily, estimated at 60,000 people, moving all to the city of Lucera in Apulia between 1221 and 1226.

Conflict between the Hohenstaufen house and the Papacy led, in 1266, to Pope Innocent IV crowning the French prince Charles, count of Anjou and Provence, as the king of both Sicily and Naples.

Strong opposition to French officialdom due to mistreatment and taxation saw the local peoples of Sicily rise up, leading in 1282 to an insurrection known as the War of the Sicilian Vespers, which eventually saw almost the entire French population on the island killed. During the war, the Sicilians turned to Peter III of Aragon, son-in-law of the last Hohenstaufen king, for support after being rejected by the Pope. Peter gained control of Sicily from the French, who, however, retained control of the Kingdom of Naples. A crusade was launched in August 1283 against Peter III and the Crown of Aragon by Pope Martin IV (a pope from Île-de-France), but it failed. The wars continued until the peace of Caltabellotta in 1302, which saw Peter's son Frederick III recognized as the king of the Isle of Sicily, while Charles II was recognized as the king of Naples by Pope Boniface VIII. Sicily was ruled as an independent kingdom by relatives of the kings of Aragon until 1409 and then as part of the Crown of Aragon.

In October 1347, in Messina, Sicily, the Black Death first arrived in Europe.

Between the 15th and 18th centuries, waves of Greeks from the Peloponnese (such as the Maniots) and Arvanites migrated to Sicily in large numbers to escape persecution after the Ottoman conquest of the Peloponnese. They brought with them Eastern Orthodoxy as well as the Greek and Arvanitika languages, once again adding onto the extensive Byzantine/Greek influence.

The onset of the Spanish Inquisition in 1492 led to Ferdinand II decreeing the expulsion of all Jews from Sicily. The eastern part of the island was hit by destructive earthquakes in 1542 and 1693. Just a few years before the latter earthquake, the island was struck by a plague. The earthquake in 1693 took an estimated 60,000 lives. There were revolts during the 17th century, but these were quelled with force, especially the revolts of Palermo and Messina. North African slave raids discouraged settlement along the coast until the 19th century. The Treaty of Utrecht in 1713 saw Sicily assigned to the House of Savoy; however, this period of rule lasted only seven years, as it was exchanged for the island of Sardinia with Emperor Charles VI of the Austrian Habsburg Dynasty.

While the Austrians were concerned with the War of the Polish Succession, a Bourbon prince, Charles from Spain was able to conquer Sicily and Naples. At first Sicily was able to remain as an independent kingdom under personal union, while the Bourbons ruled over both from Naples. However, the advent of Napoleon's First French Empire saw Naples taken at the Battle of Campo Tenese and Bonapartist King of Naples was installed. Ferdinand III, the Bourbon, was forced to retreat to Sicily which he was still in control of with the help of British naval protection.

Following this, Sicily joined the Napoleonic Wars, and subsequently the British under Lord William Bentinck established a military and diplomatic presence on the island to protect against a French invasion. Sicilian volunteers joined the British military to form the Royal Sicilian Regiment, which saw action at the Battle of Maida and then transferred to Iberia. After the wars were won, Sicily and Naples formally merged as the Two Sicilies under the Bourbons. Major revolutionary movements occurred in 1820 and 1848 against the Bourbon government with Sicily seeking independence; the second of which, the 1848 revolution resulted in a short period of independence for Sicily. However, in 1849 the Bourbons retook control of the island and dominated it until 1860.

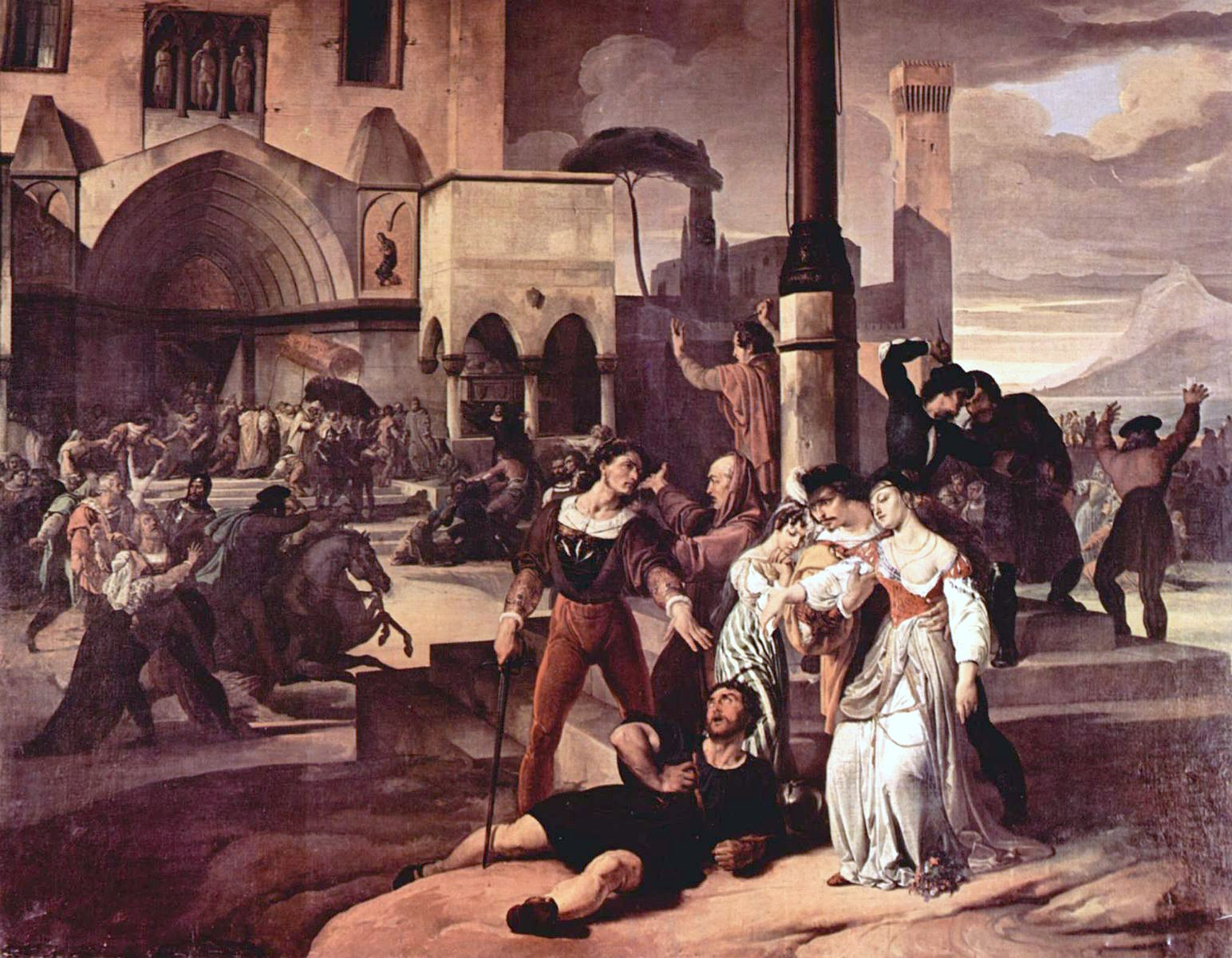
Sicilian Vespers, a successful rebellion on the island of Sicily that broke out at Easter 1282 against the rule of the French-born king Charles I of Anjou

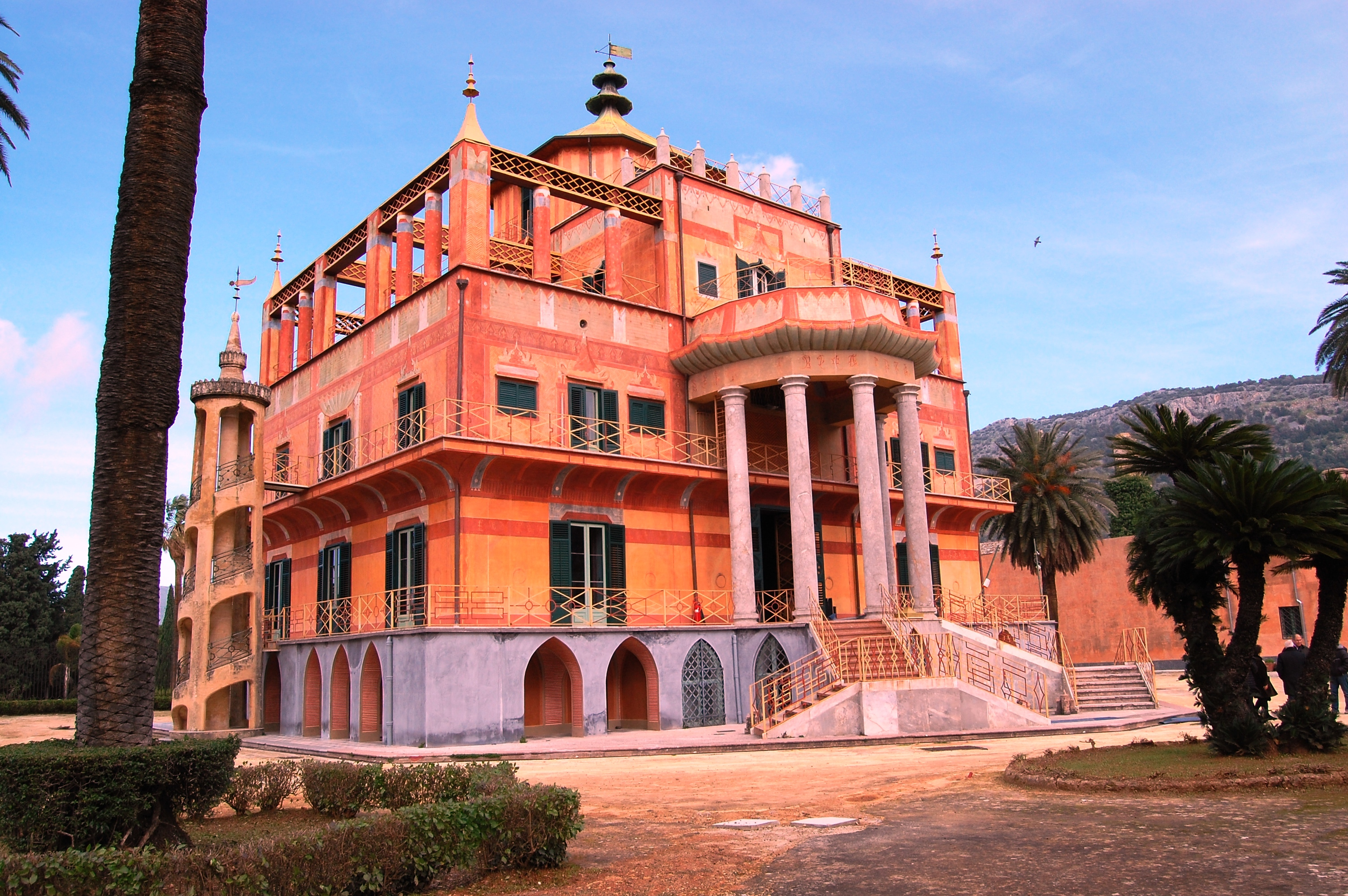
The Palazzina Cinese in Palermo, built from 1799 to 1806 by Ferdinand III of Sicily

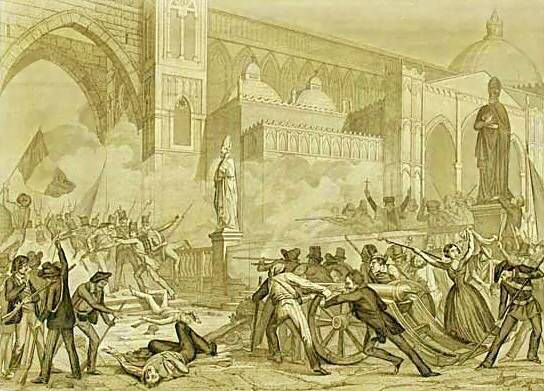
The Sicilian revolution of 1848, which was characterised by a wide use of the Italian tricolour

=== Italian unification ===
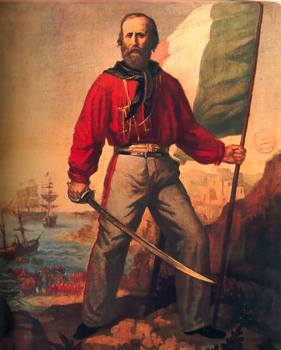
Giuseppe Garibaldi lands in Marsala in 1860, during the Expedition of the Thousand, as part of the Italian unification

The Expedition of the Thousand led by Giuseppe Garibaldi captured Sicily in 1860, as part of the Risorgimento. The conquest started at Marsala, and native Sicilians joined him in the capture of the southern Italian peninsula. Garibaldi's march was completed with the siege of Gaeta, where the final Bourbons were expelled and Garibaldi announced his dictatorship in the name of Victor Emmanuel II of Kingdom of Sardinia. Sicily became part of the Kingdom of Sardinia after a referendum in which more than 75% of Sicily voted in favour of the annexation on 21 October 1860 (although not everyone was allowed to vote). As a result of the proclamation of the Kingdom of Italy, Sicily became part of the kingdom on 17 March 1861.

The Sicilian economy (and the wider mezzogiorno economy) remained relatively underdeveloped after the Italian unification, in spite of the strong investments made by the Kingdom of Italy in terms of modern infrastructure, and this caused an unprecedented wave of emigration. In 1894, organisations of workers and peasants known as the Fasci Siciliani protested against the bad social and economic conditions of the island, but they were suppressed in a few days.

This period was also characterized by the first contact between the Sicilian Mafia (the crime syndicate also known as Cosa Nostra) and the Italian government. The battle against the Mafia made by the Kingdom of Italy was controversial and ambiguous. The Carabinieri (the military police of Italy) and sometimes the Royal Italian Army were often involved in fights against the mafia members, but their efforts were frequently useless because of the weakness of the Italian judicial system and cooperation between the mafia and local governments.

=== 20th and 21st centuries ===
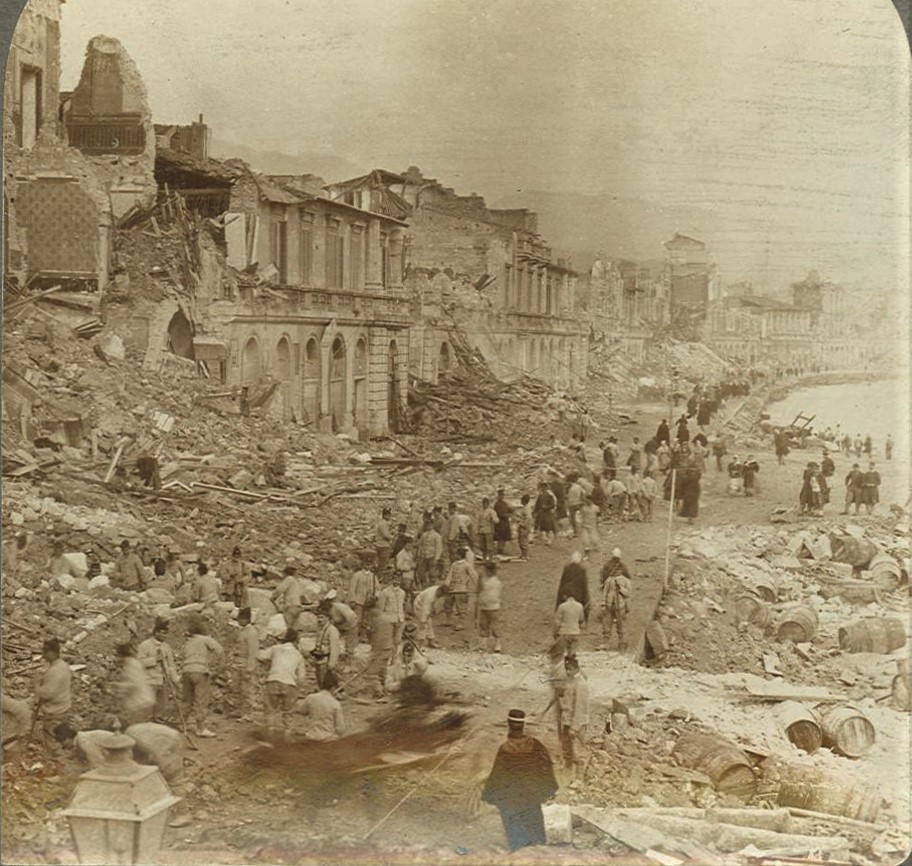
Ruins of Messina after the 1908 earthquake and tsunami. Taken at the northern section of the Palazzata in front of the harbour.

The Messina earthquake of 28 December 1908 killed more than 80,000 people.

In the 1920s, the fascist regime began taking stronger military action, led by Cesare Mori (nicknamed the "Iron Prefect" for his iron-fisted campaigns), against the Sicilian Mafia, the first that ended with considerable success. An Allied invasion of Sicily during World War II began on 10 July 1943. In preparation for the invasion, the Allies revitalised the Mafia to aid them. The invasion of Sicily contributed to the 25 July crisis; in general, the Allied victors were warmly embraced by Sicilians.

In the aftermath of World War II, Italy became a republic in 1946. Under the Constitution of Italy, Sicily is one of five regions with autonomy. Both the partial Italian land reform and special funding from the Italian government's Cassa per il Mezzogiorno (Fund for the South) from 1950 to 1984 helped the Sicilian economy. During this period, the economic and social condition of the island was generally improved because of investments in infrastructure (such as motorways and airports) and the creation of industrial and commercial areas. In the 1980s, the Mafia was weakened by another campaign led by magistrates Giovanni Falcone and Paolo Borsellino. Between 1990 and 2005, the unemployment rate fell from about 23% to 11%.

The Cosa Nostra has traditionally been the most powerful group in Sicily, especially around Palermo. A police investigation in the summer of 2019 confirmed strong links between the Palermo area Sicilian Mafia and American organized crime, particularly the Gambino crime family. According to La Repubblica, "Off they go, through the streets of Passo di Rigano, Boccadifalco, Torretta and at the same time, Brooklyn, Staten Island, [and] New Jersey. Because from Sicily to the US, the old mafia has returned."

== Geography ==
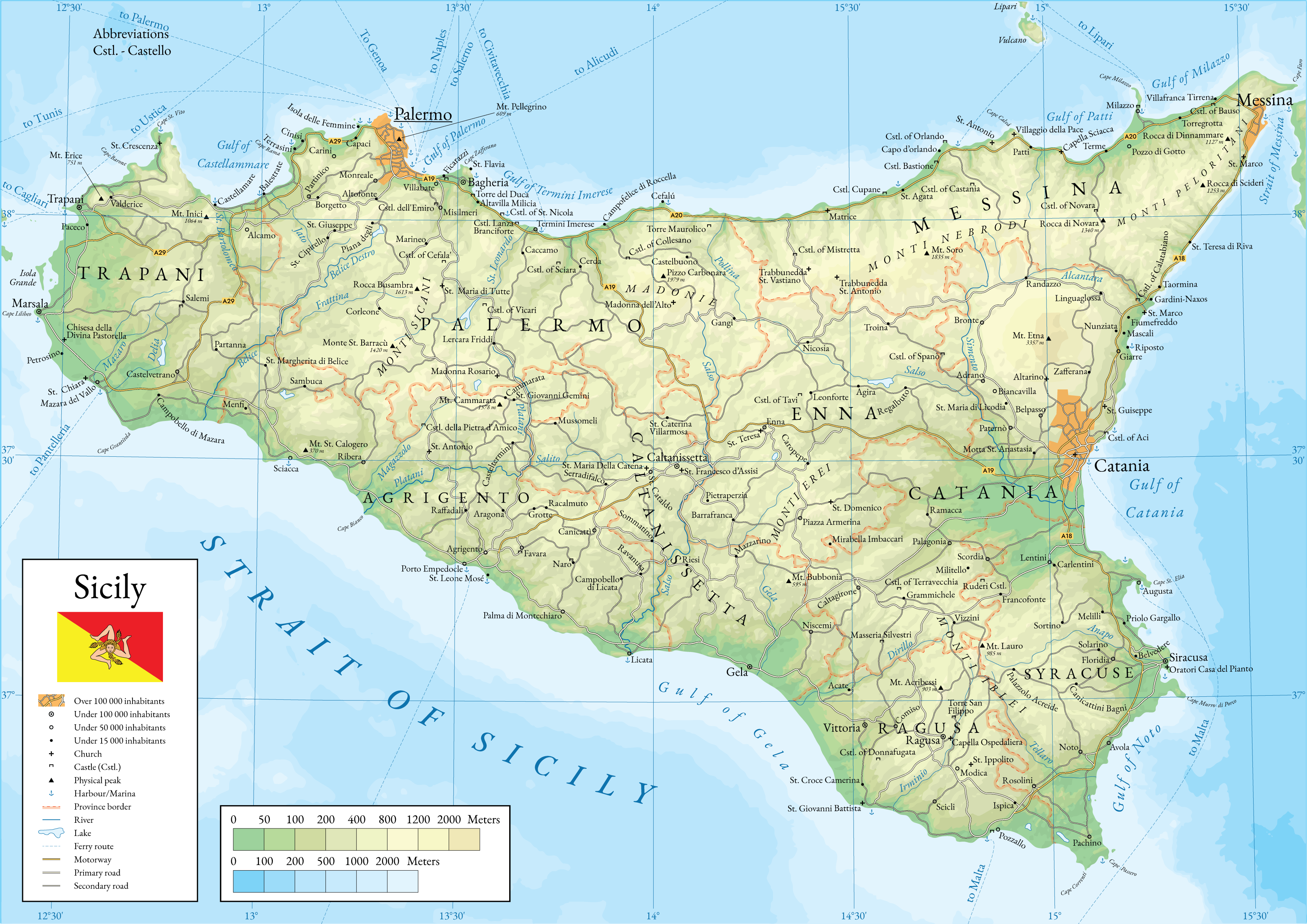
Relief map of Sicily

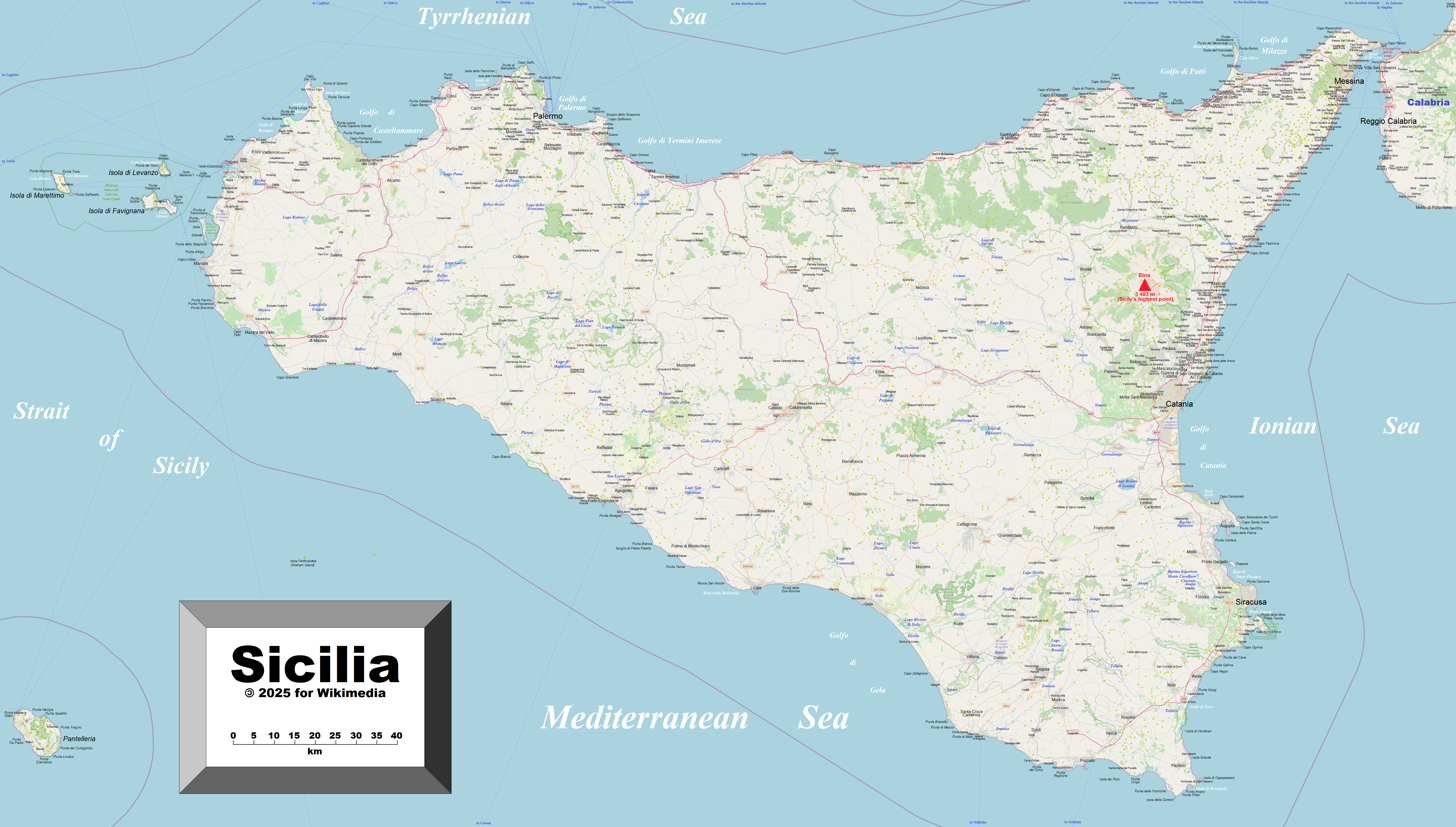
Detailed map of Sicily

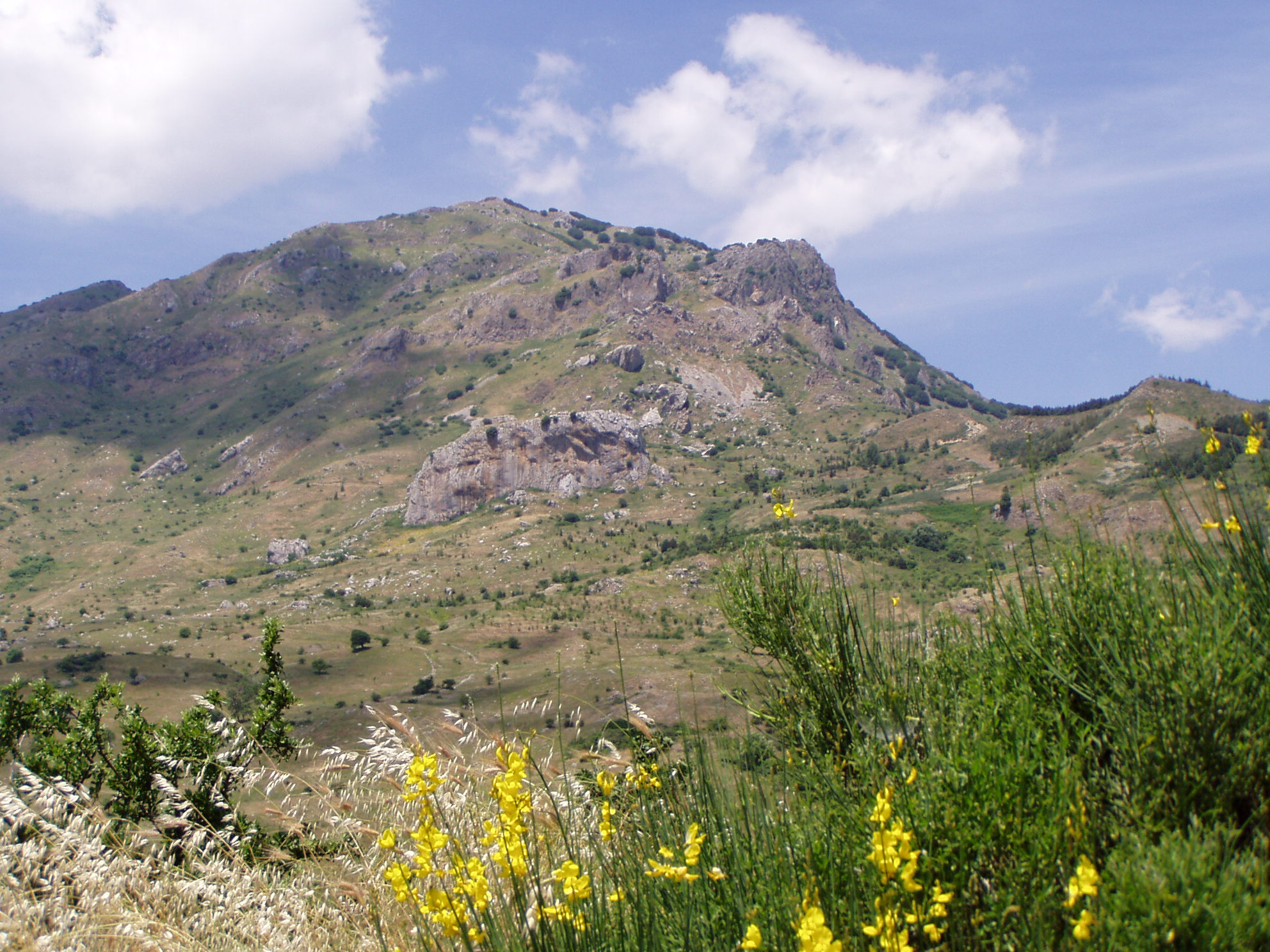
Madonie mountains in the Madonie Regional Natural Park.

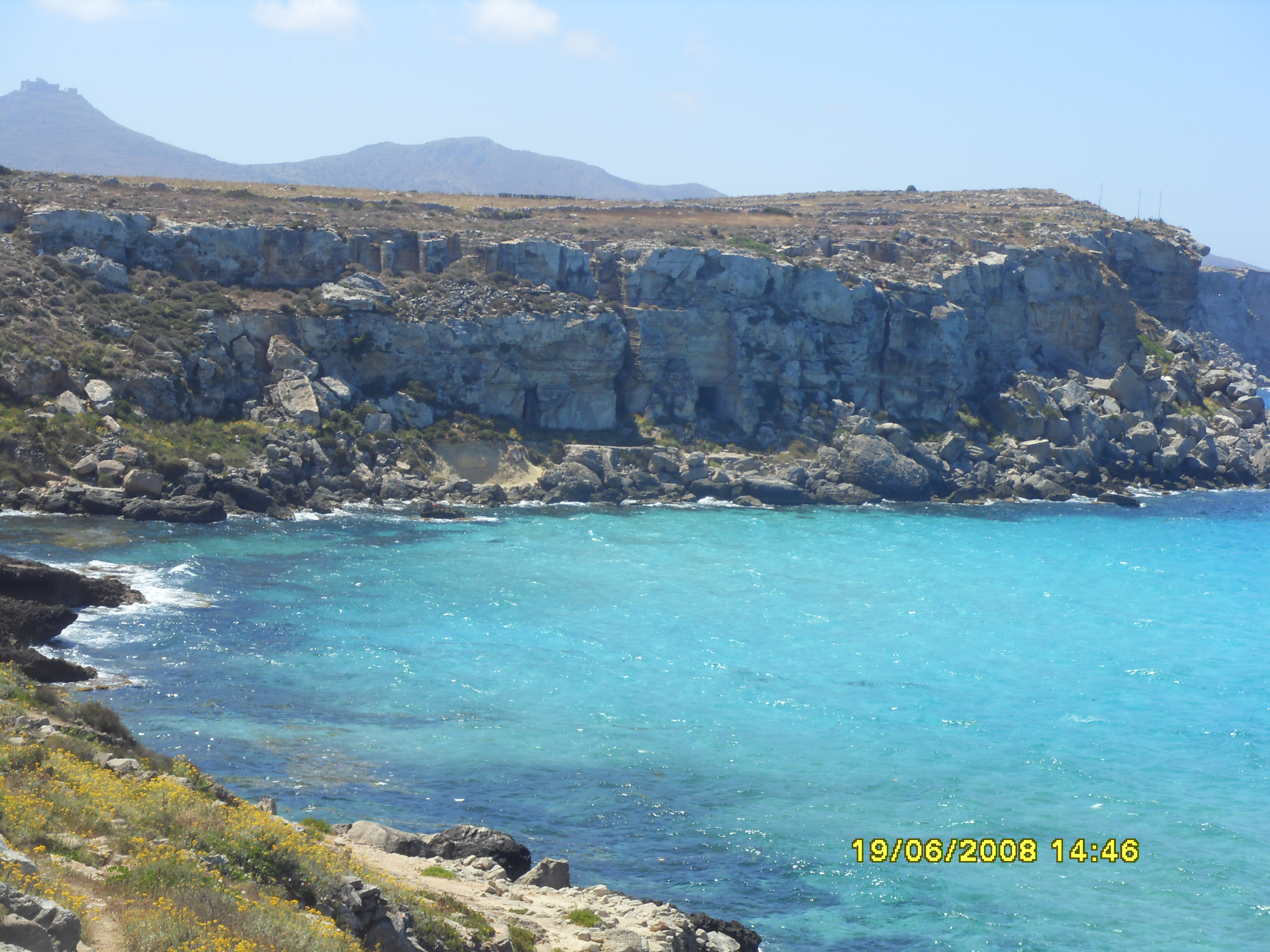
Cala Rossa, island of Favignana, Aegadian Islands

Sicily has a roughly triangular shape, earning it the name Trinacria.

To the north-east, it is separated from Calabria and the rest of the Italian mainland by the Strait of Messina, about 3 km (1.9 mi) wide in the north, and about 16 km (9.9 mi) wide in the southern part. The northern and southern coasts are each about 280 km (170 mi) long measured as a straight line, while the eastern coast measures around 180 km (110 mi); total coast length is estimated at 1,484 km (922 mi). The total area of the island is 25,711 km^{2} (9,927 sq mi), while the Autonomous Region of Sicily (which includes the smaller surrounding islands of Lipari, Egadi, Ustica, and Pantelleria) has an area of 27,708 km^{2} (10,698 sq mi).

The terrain of inland Sicily is mostly hilly and is intensively cultivated wherever possible. Along the northern coast, the mountain ranges of Madonie, 2,000 m (6,600 ft), Nebrodi, 1,800 m (5,900 ft), and Peloritani, 1,300 m (4,300 ft), are an extension of the mainland Apennines. The cone of Mount Etna dominates the eastern coast. In the southeast lie the lower Hyblaean Mountains, 1,000 m (3,300 ft). The mines of the Enna and Caltanissetta districts were part of a leading sulphur-producing area throughout the 19th century, but have declined since the 1950s.

Sicily and its surrounding small islands have some highly active volcanoes. This is due to Sicily being geographically on the northern edge of the African Plate. Mount Etna is the largest active volcano in Europe and casts black ash over the island with its recurrent eruptions. It stands 3,403 metres (11,165 ft) high as of September 2024. It is the highest mountain in Italy south of the Alps. Etna covers an area of 1,190 km^{2} (459 sq mi) with a basal circumference of 140 km (87 mi). This makes it the largest of the three active volcanoes in Italy, being about two and a half times the height of the next largest, Mount Vesuvius. In Greek mythology, the deadly monster Typhon was trapped under the mountain by Zeus, the god of the sky. Mount Etna is widely regarded as a cultural symbol and icon of Sicily.

The Aeolian Islands in the Tyrrhenian Sea, to the northeast of mainland Sicily form a volcanic complex. The three volcanoes of Vulcano, Stromboli and Lipari are also active, although the last is usually dormant. Off the southern coast of Sicily, the underwater volcano of Ferdinandea, which is part of the larger Empedocles volcano, last erupted in 1831. It is located between the coast of Agrigento and the island of Pantelleria (which itself is a dormant volcano).

The autonomous region also includes several neighbouring islands: the Aegadian Islands, the Aeolian Islands, Pantelleria and Lampedusa. From a geographical perspective, also forming a part of Sicily is the Maltese Archipelago, the islands constitute the republic of Malta.

=== Mountains ===
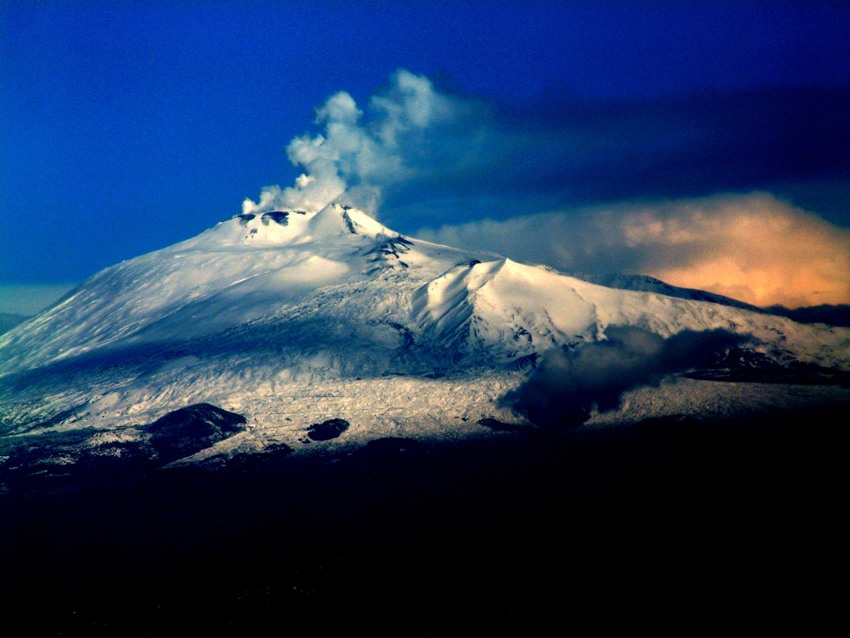
Mount Etna in eruption

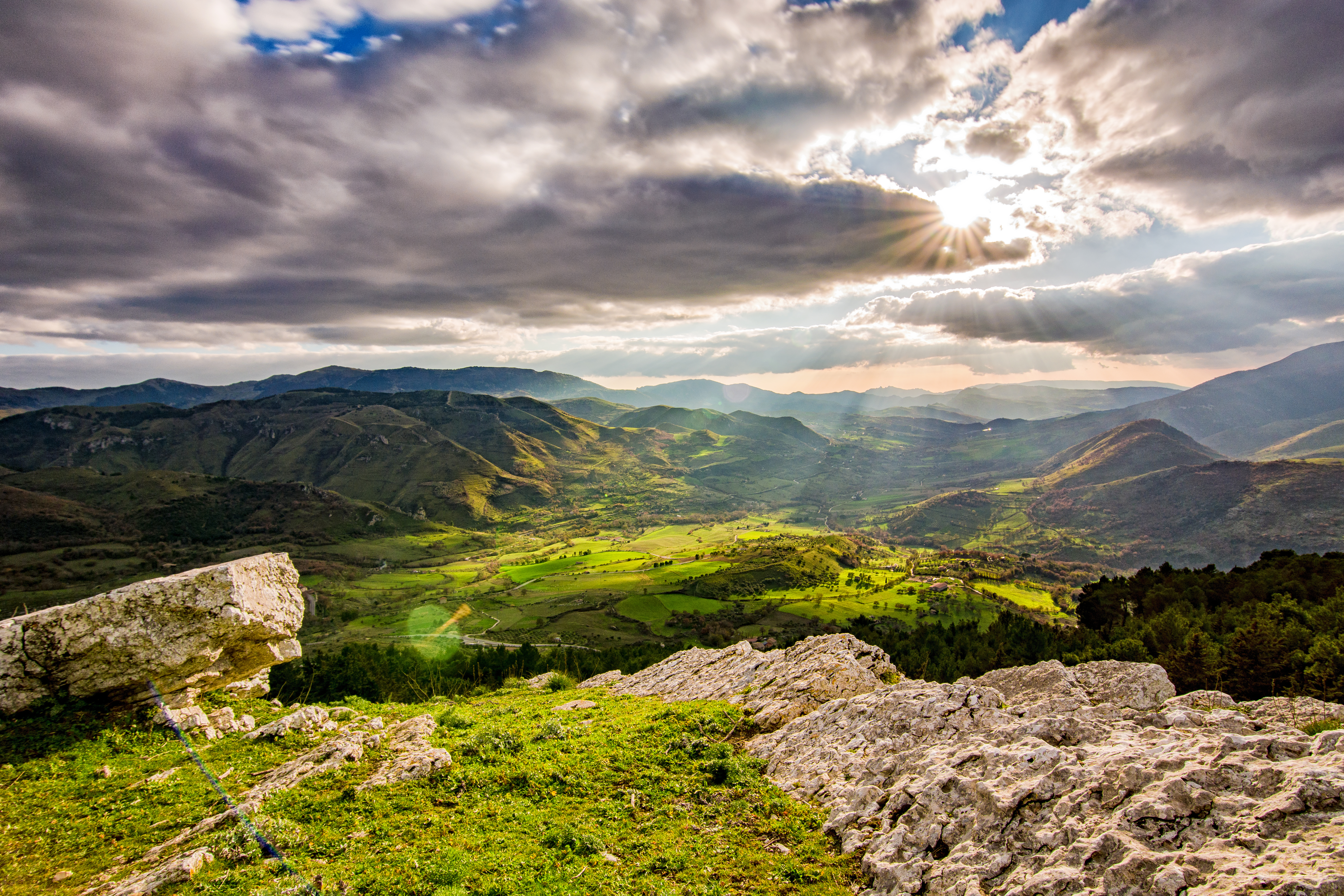
The Monti Sicani in western Sicily

The mountains of Sicily form a significant part of the island's diverse landscape, with Mount Etna, one of the world's most active volcanoes, being the highest and most notable peak. Other important mountain ranges include the Nebrodi, Madonie and Peloritani mountains ranges.

Five tallest mountains of Sicily
Name	Height (meters)	Height (feet)
Mount Etna	3,357	11,014
Pizzo Carbonara	1,979	6,493
Monte Soro	1,853	6,079
Rocca Busambra	1,613	5,292
Monte San Calogero	1,326	4,318

=== Rivers ===
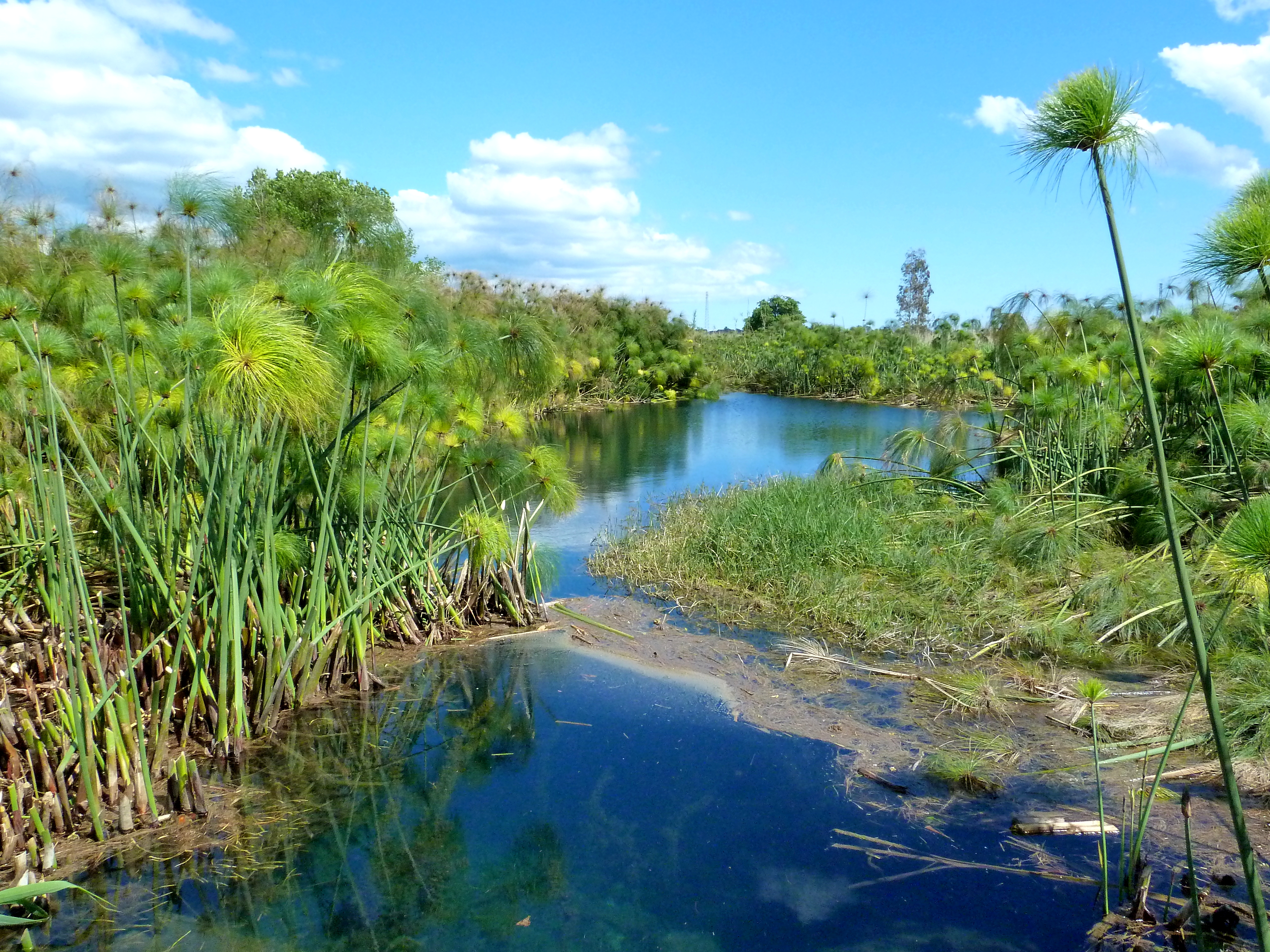
View of the Ciane river

Several rivers drain the island, most of which flow through the central area and enter the sea at the south of the island. The Salso flows through parts of Enna and Caltanissetta before entering the Mediterranean Sea at the port of Licata. To the east, the Alcantara flows through the province of Messina and enters the sea at Giardini Naxos, and the Simeto, which flows into the Ionian Sea south of Catania. Other important rivers on the island are the Belice and Platani in the southwest.

River	Length
Salso	144 km (89 mi)
Simeto	113 km (70 mi)
Belice	107 km (66 mi)
Dittaino	105 km (65 mi)
Platani	103 km (64 mi)
Gornalunga	81 km (50 mi)
Gela	74 km (46 mi)
Salso Cimarosa	72 km (45 mi)
Torto	58 km (36 mi)
Irminio	57 km (35 mi)
Dirillo	54 km (34 mi)
Verdura	53 km (33 mi)
Alcantara	52 km (32 mi)
Tellaro	49 km (30 mi)
Anapo	40 km (25 mi)

=== Climate ===
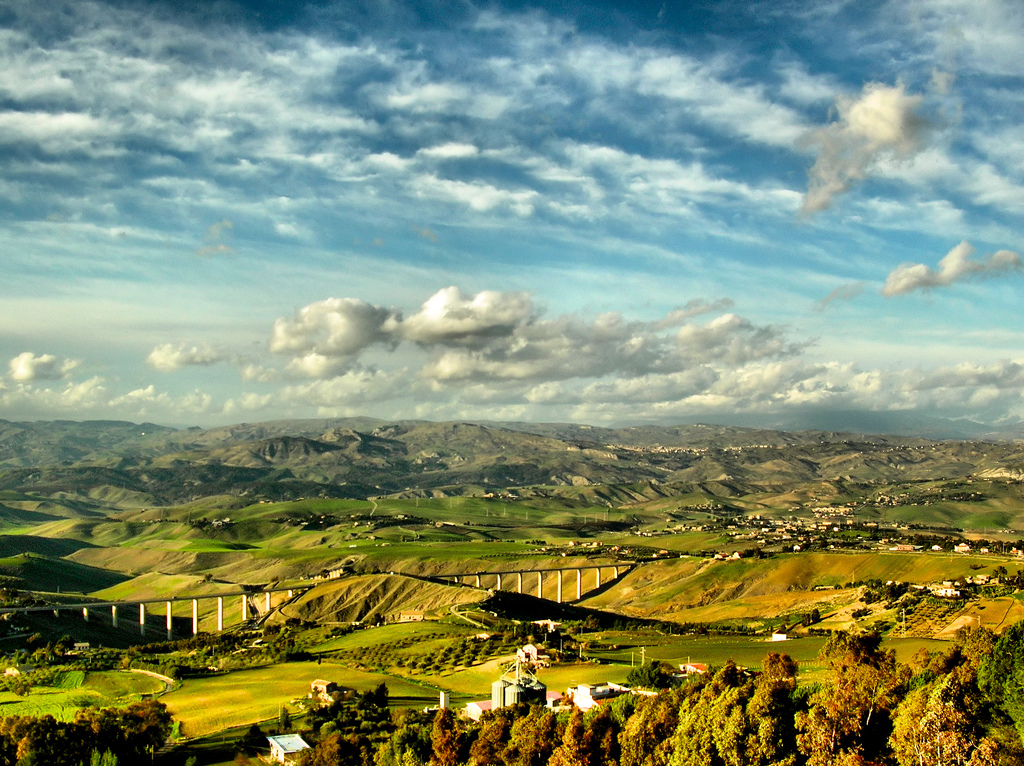
Inner Sicily

Sicily has for the most part a typical Mediterranean climate (Köppen climate classification: Csa) with mild and wet winters and hot, dry summers with changeable intermediate seasons. On the coasts, especially in the southwest, the climate is affected by the African currents and summers can be hot.

Snow falls above 900 metres, but it can fall in the hills. The interior mountains, especially Nebrodi, Madonie, and Etna, enjoy a mountain climate, with heavy snowfalls during winter. The summit of Mount Etna is usually snow-capped from October to May.

In the summer, the sirocco – the wind from the Sahara – can be felt. Rainfall is scarce, and in some provinces a water crisis can occur.

According to the Regional Agency for Waste and Water, on 10 August 1999, the weather station of Catenanuova (EN) recorded an unofficial maximum temperature of 48.5 °C (119 °F). On 11 August 2021, a new highest temperature record for Europe with a reading of 48.8 °C (119.8 °F) was set near the city of Syracuse. Total precipitation is highly variable, generally increasing with elevation. In general, the southern and southeast coast receives the least rainfall (less than 50 cm (20 in)), and the northern and northeastern highlands the most (over 100 cm (39 in)).

=== Flora and fauna ===
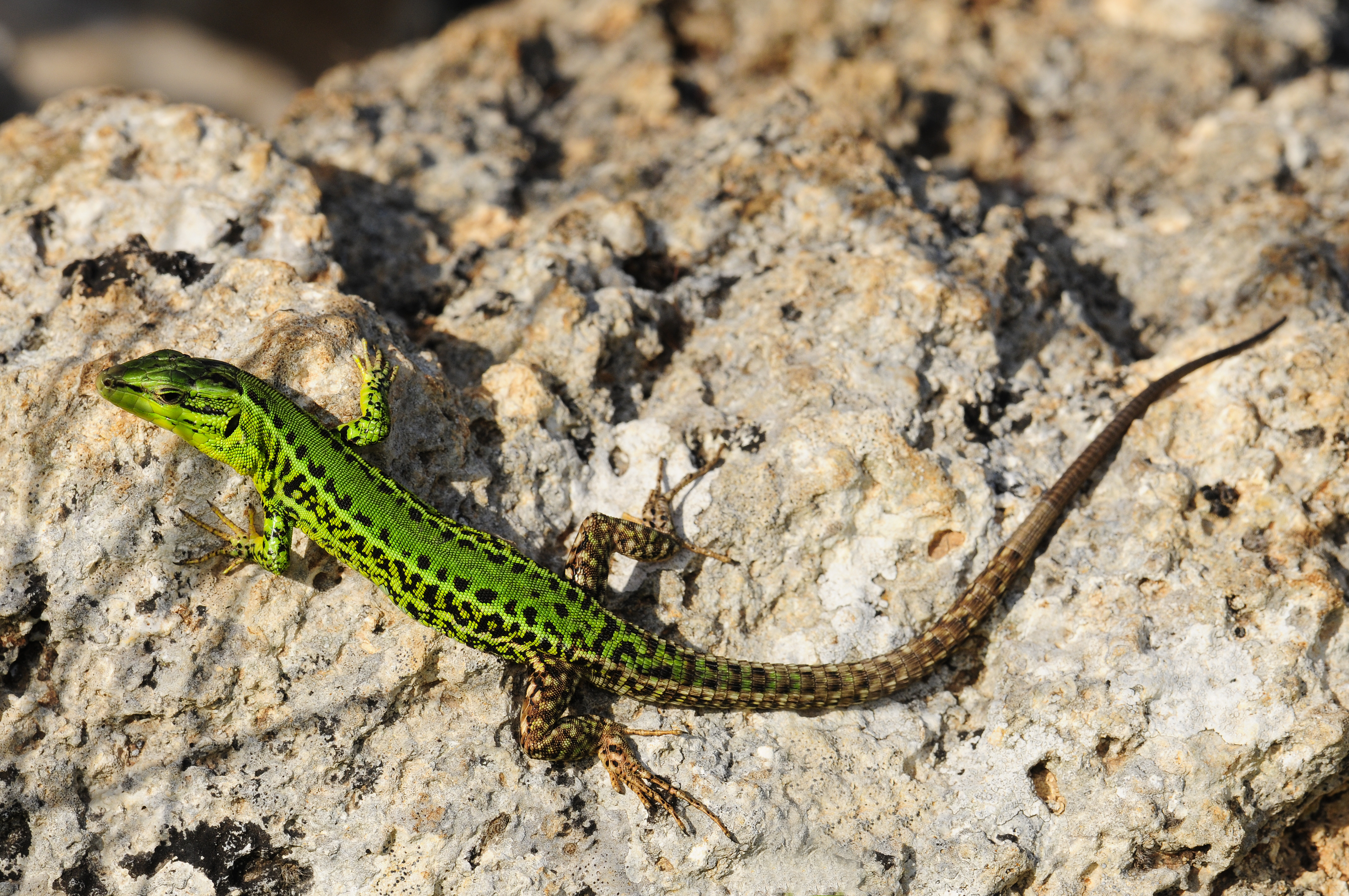
The Sicilian wall lizard endemic to Sicily and the Aegadian Islands

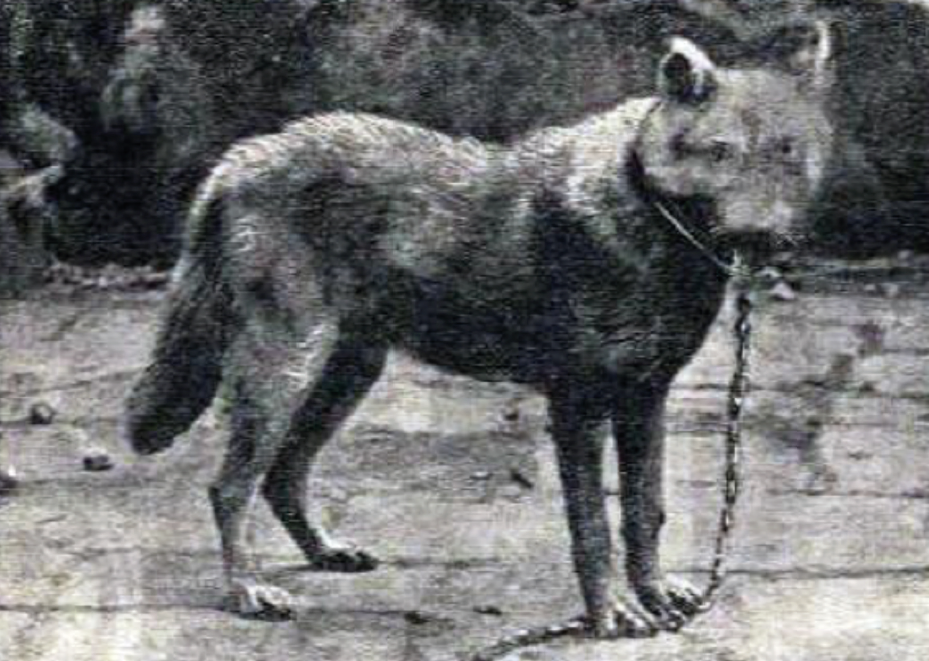
The Sicilian wolf reportedly went extinct due to human persecution in the 1920s, though there were several possible sightings up to the 1970s.

Sicily is an often-quoted example of man-made deforestation, which has occurred since Roman times when the island was turned into an agricultural region. This gradually dried the climate, leading to a decline in rainfall and the drying of rivers. The central and southwest provinces are practically devoid of forest. In Northern Sicily, there are three important forests; near Mount Etna, in the Nebrodi Mountains and in the Bosco della Ficuzza Natural Reserve near Palermo. The Nebrodi Mountains Regional Park, established on 4 August 1993 and covering 86,000 hectares (210,000 acres), is the largest protected natural area of Sicily; it contains the largest forest in Sicily, the Caronia. The Hundred Horse Chestnut (Castagno dei Cento Cavalli), in Sant'Alfio, on the eastern slopes of Mount Etna, is the largest and oldest known chestnut tree in the world at 2,000–4,000 years old.

Sicily has a wide variety of fauna. Species include the European wildcat, red fox, least weasel, pine marten, fallow deer, wild boar, crested porcupine, European hedgehog, common toad, Vipera aspis, golden eagle, peregrine falcon, Eurasian hoopoe and black-winged stilt. Roe deer were driven to extinction on the island. The Sicilian wolf (Canis lupus cristaldii) was an endemic wolf subspecies that was driven to extinction in the 20th century. During the Late Pleistocene, a species of dwarf elephant, Palaeoloxodon mnaidriensis inhabited the island, with its latest records on Sicily dating to around 20,000 years ago.

The Riserva naturale dello Zingaro (Zingaro Natural Reserve) is one of the best examples of unspoiled coastal wilderness in Sicily.

Marine Life of the Straits of Messina includes varieties of birds and marine life, including larger species such as greater flamingo and fin whale.

== Demographics ==
Historical population
Year	Pop.	±%
1861	2,408,513	—
1871	2,590,165	+7.5%
1881	2,933,154	+13.2%
1901	3,568,124	+21.6%
1911	3,811,755	+6.8%
1921	4,223,160	+10.8%
1931	3,905,967	−7.5%
1936	4,000,078	+2.4%
1951	4,486,749	+12.2%
1961	4,721,001	+5.2%
1971	4,680,711	−0.9%
1981	4,906,878	+4.8%
1991	4,966,386	+1.2%
2001	4,968,991	+0.1%
2011	5,002,904	+0.7%
2021	4,833,329	−3.4%
Source: ISTAT

As of 2026, the population is 4,775,194, of which 48.9% are male, and 51.1% are female. Minors make up 15.7% of the population, and seniors make up 24.2%.

In the first century after the Italian unification, Sicily had one of the most negative net migration rates among the regions of Italy because of the emigration of millions of people to Northern Italy, other European countries, North America, South America and Australia. Like the South of Italy and Sardinia, immigration to the island is very low compared to other regions of Italy because workers tend to head to Northern Italy instead, due to better employment and industrial opportunities. As in the rest of Italy, the official language is Italian and the primary religion is Roman Catholicism.

=== Emigration ===
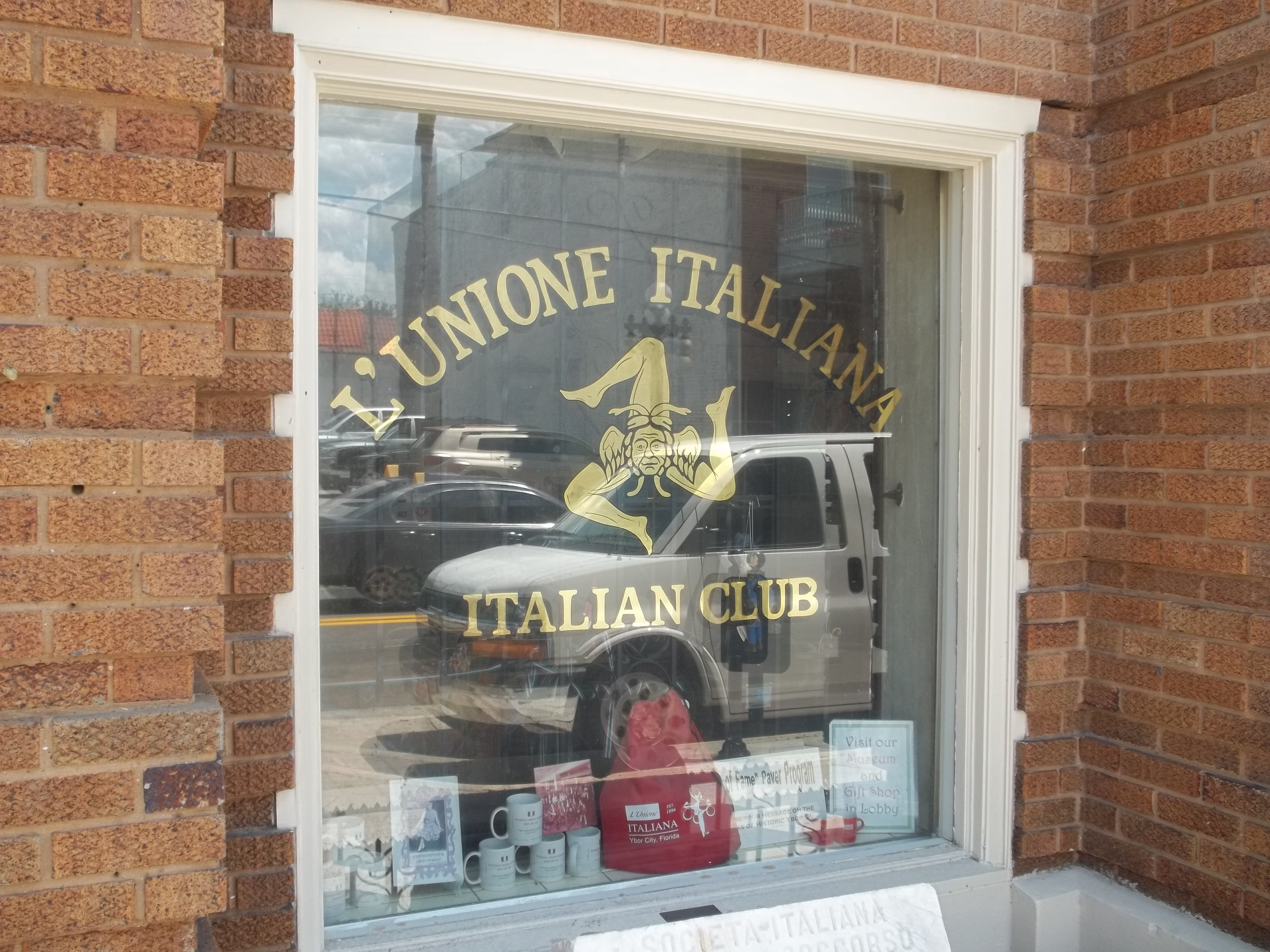
The Sicilian triskelion in Ybor City, a district of Tampa, Florida, home to many Sicilian Americans

Sicilian emigration started shortly after Italian unification and has continued into the present day. The aforementioned factors, along with a failed land reform, resulted in an unprecedented wave of Sicilians emigrating, first to the United States between the 1880s and the 1920s and later to northern Italy; since the 1960s, other population destinations include Belgium, France, Germany, Switzerland, as well as Australia and South America. An estimated 10 million people of Sicilian origin live around the world.

The trend of emigration, particularly among young Sicilians leaving the island in search of employment elsewhere in Italy and abroad, continues in the early 21st century. Sicily remains the Italian region with the highest number of expatriates: as of 2017, over 750,000 Sicilians, 14.4% of the island's population, lived abroad.

=== Immigration ===
As of 2025, immigrants make up 6.4% of the population. The 5 largest foreign countries of birth are Romania, Germany, Tunisia, Morocco, and Switzerland.

Foreign population by country of birth (2025)
Country of birth	Population
Romania	41,485
Germany	35,257
Tunisia	29,710
Morocco	17,506
Switzerland	14,336
Bangladesh	13,880
Albania	12,018
Sri Lanka	10,650
Argentina	10,486
Venezuela	7,088
France	6,892
United States	6,399
Poland	5,631
China	5,125
Ukraine	5,064

=== Largest cities ===
The 10 largest cities of Sicily are:

#	City	Population (2026)	Area (km^{2})	Density
1	Palermo	626,273	160.59	3,899.8
2	Catania	296,984	182.90	1,623.8
3	Messina	216,458	213.75	1,012.7
4	Syracuse	115,515	207.78	555.9
5	Marsala	79,521	243.26	326.9
6	Ragusa	74,122	444.67	166.7
7	Gela	70,109	279.07	251.2
8	Vittoria	66,329	182.48	363.5
9	Caltanissetta	57,922	421.25	137.5
10	Agrigento	55,118	245.32	224.7

=== Religion ===
As in most Italian regions, Roman Catholicism is the predominant religious denomination in Sicily, and the church still plays an important role in the lives of most people. There is also a notable small minority of Eastern-rite Byzantine Catholics which has a mixed congregation of ethnic Albanians; it is operated by the Italo-Albanian Catholic Church. Most people still attend church weekly or at least for religious festivals, and many people get married in churches. There was a wide presence of Jews in Sicily for at least 1,400 years and possibly for more than 2,000 years. Some scholars believe that the Sicilian Jewry are partial ancestors of the Ashkenazi Jews. However, much of the Jewish community faded away when they were expelled from the island in 1492. Islam was present during the Emirate of Sicily, although Muslims were also expelled. Today, mostly due to immigration to the island, there are also several religious minorities, such as Jehovah's Witnesses, Hinduism, Islam, Judaism, and Sikhism. There are also some Evangelical Christians who live on the island. As of 2020, there are approximately 4,989,921 Roman Catholics in Sicily constituting about 99.2% of the island's population. Additionally there are also about 23,120 members of the Italo-Albanian Catholic Church also living in Sicily constituting roughly 0.5% of the population.

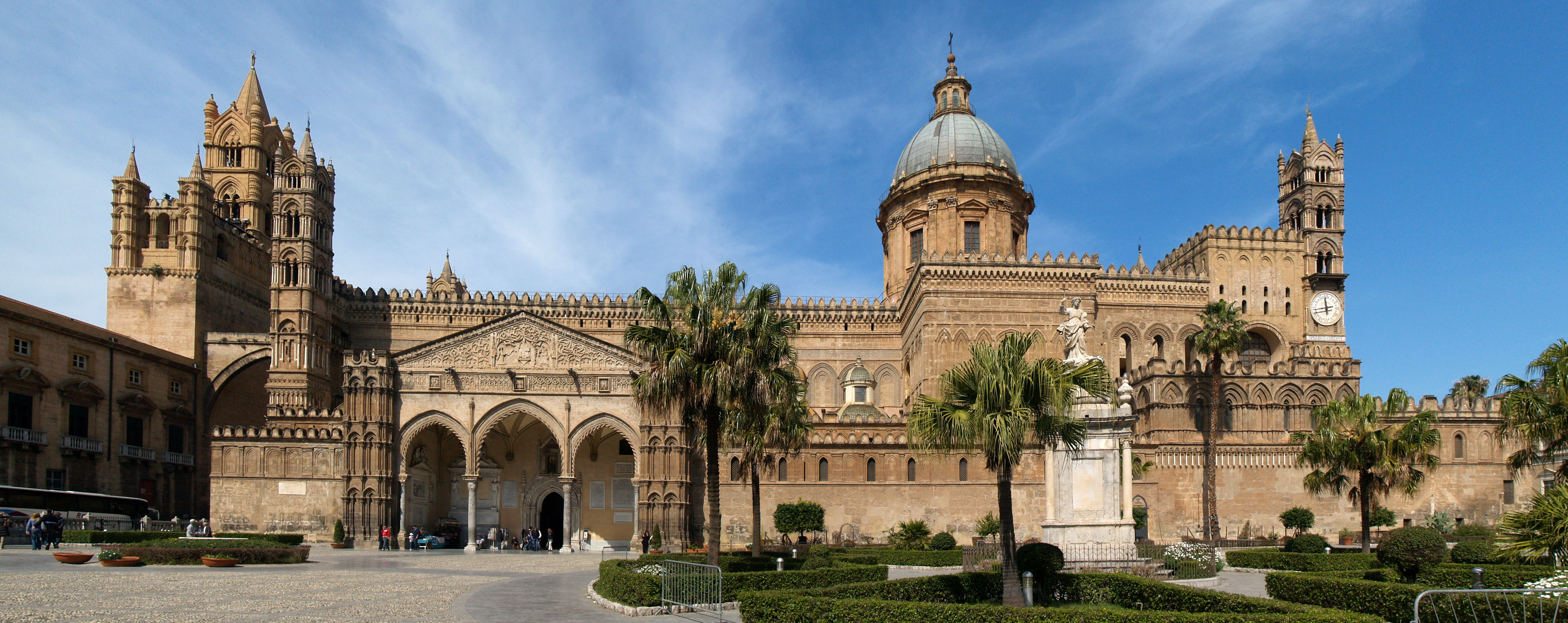
Palermo Cathedral

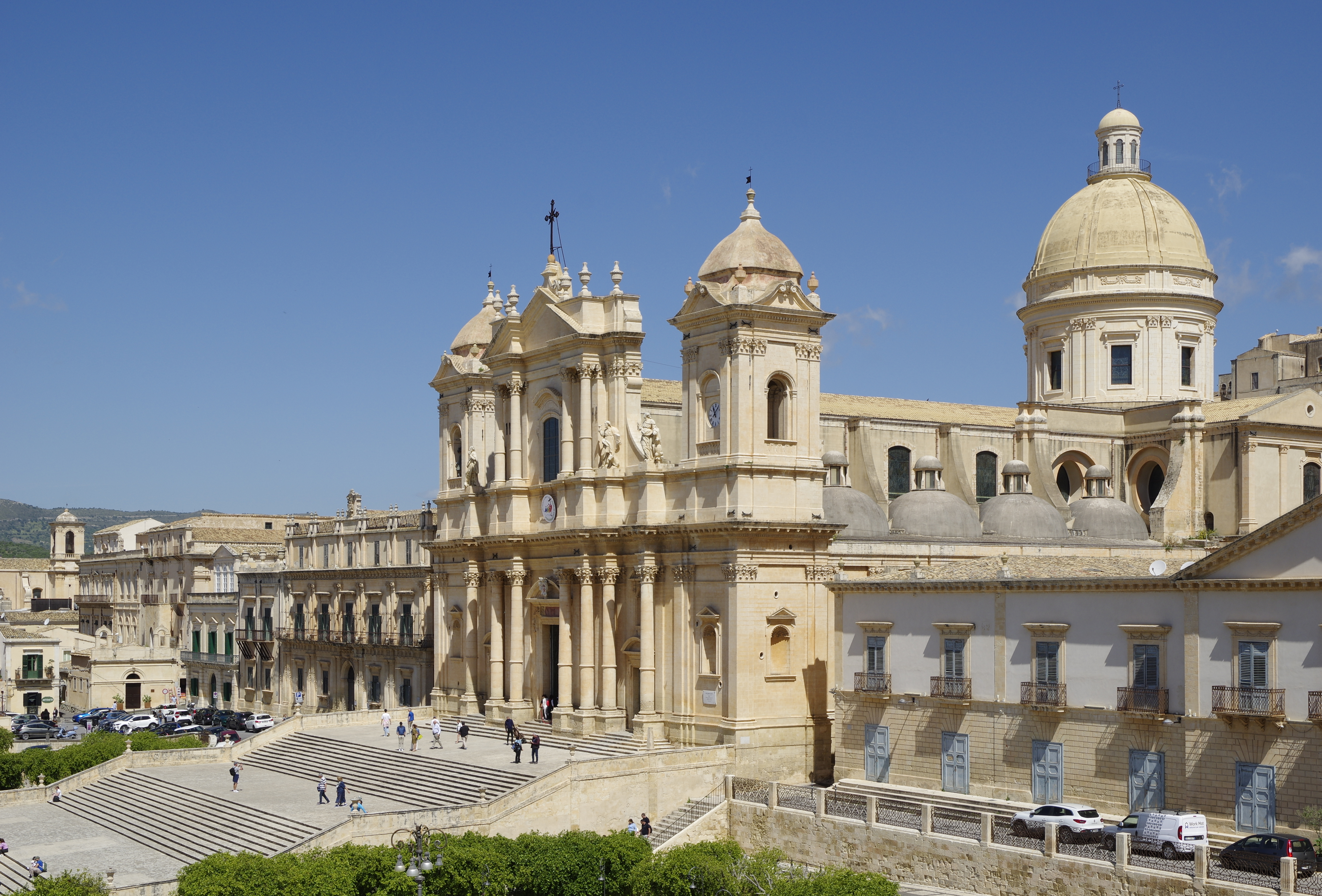
Noto Cathedral

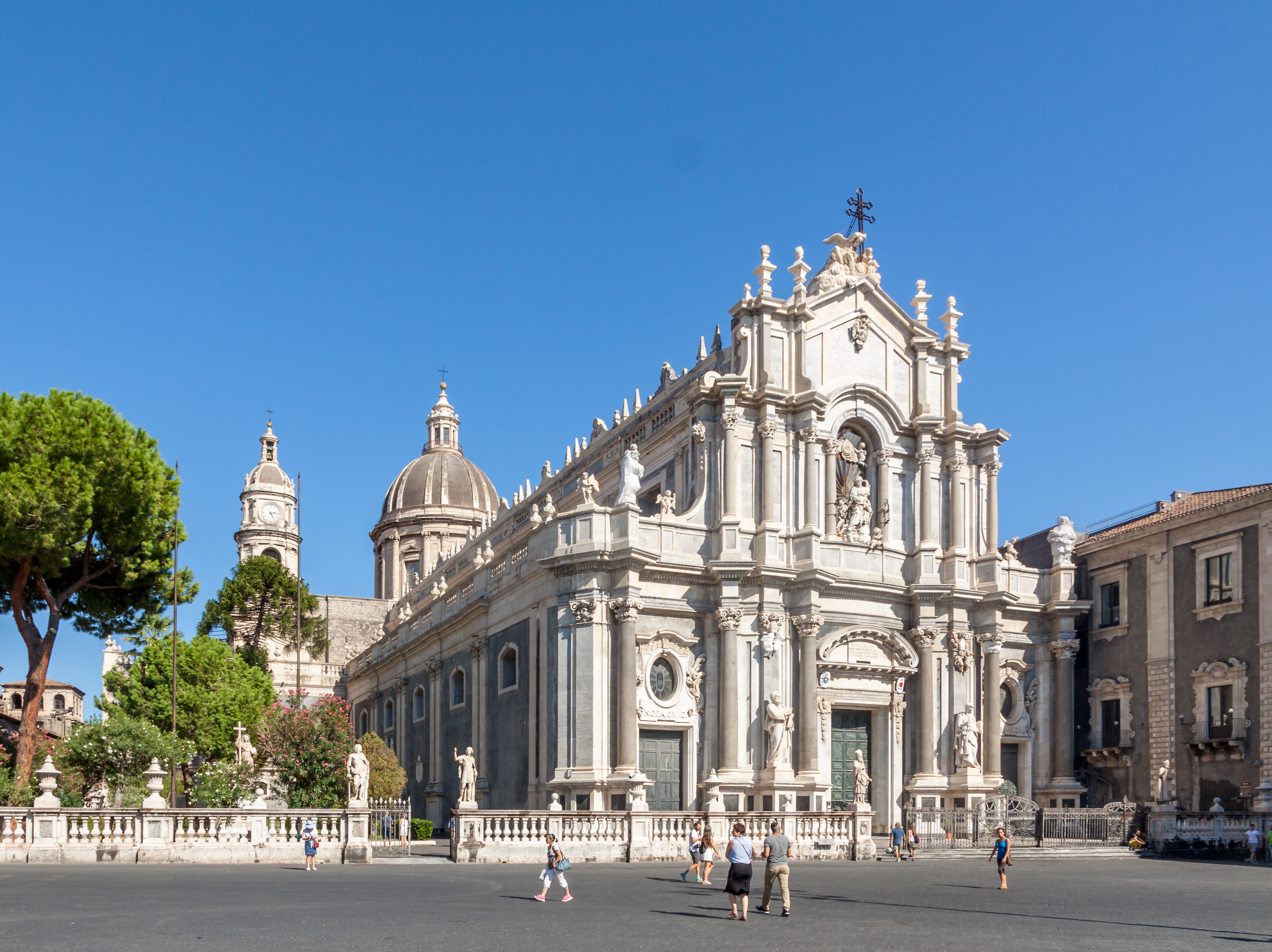
Catania Cathedral

== Politics ==
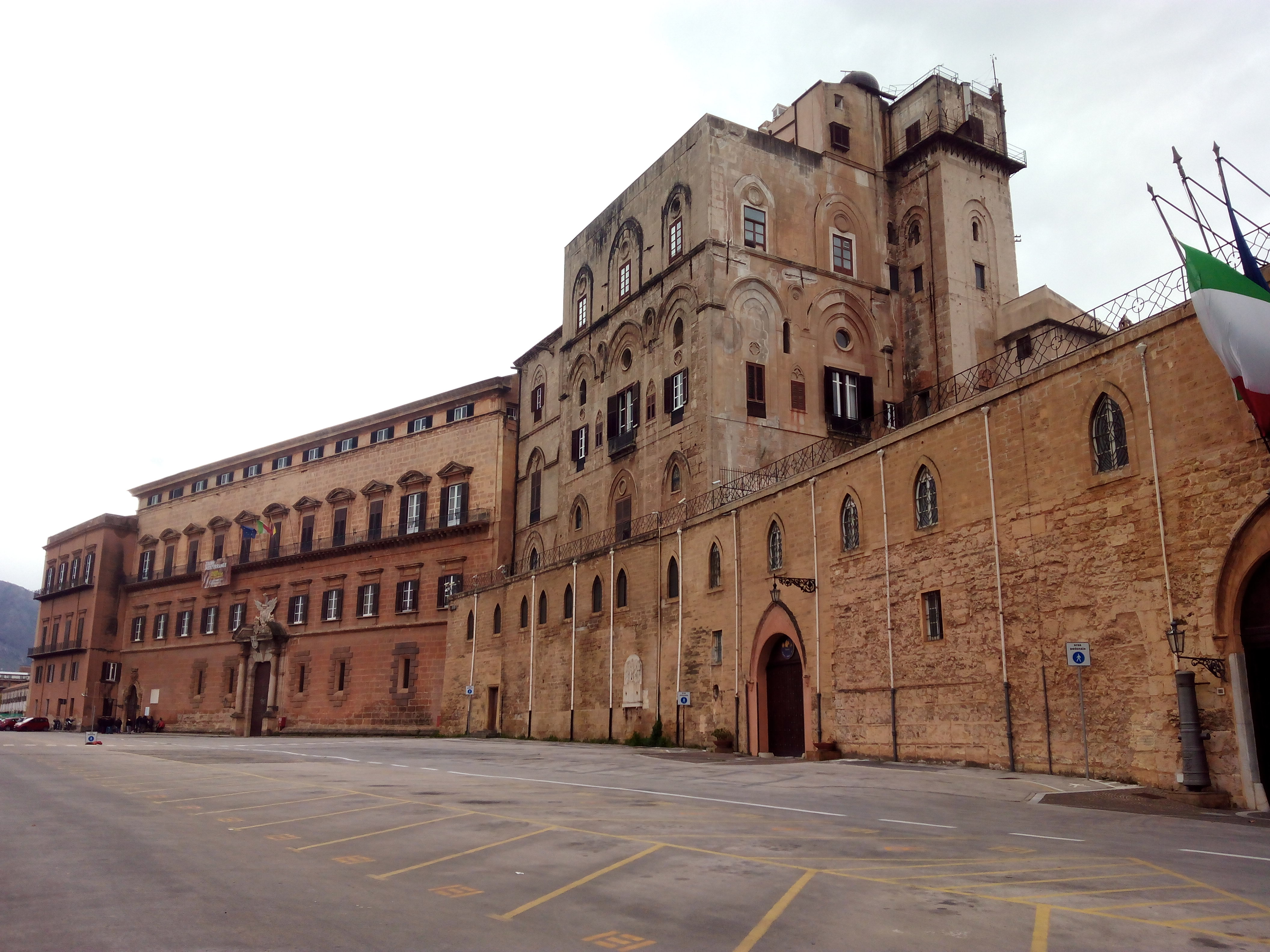
Palazzo dei Normanni, the seat of the Sicilian Regional Assembly. It was a 9th-century Arab palace, converted by the Normans into their governing castle.

The politics of Sicily takes place in a framework of a presidential representative democracy, whereby the President of Regional Government is the head of government, and of a pluriform multi-party system. Executive power is exercised by the Regional Government. Legislative power is vested in both the government and the Sicilian Regional Assembly. The capital of Sicily is Palermo.

Traditionally, Sicily votes for centre-right parties during elections. From 1943 to 1951, there was also a separatist political party called Sicilian Independence Movement (Movimento Indipendentista Siciliano, MIS). Their most successful result was at the 1946 general election, when MIS obtained 0.7% of national votes (8.8% of votes in Sicily), and four seats. However, the movement lost all their seats following the 1948 general election and the 1951 regional election. Even though it has never been formally disbanded, today the movement is no longer part of the politics of Sicily. After World War II, Sicily became a stronghold of the Christian Democracy. Sicily is now governed by a centre-right coalition. Renato Schifani is the current President and has served since 2022.

=== Administrative divisions ===
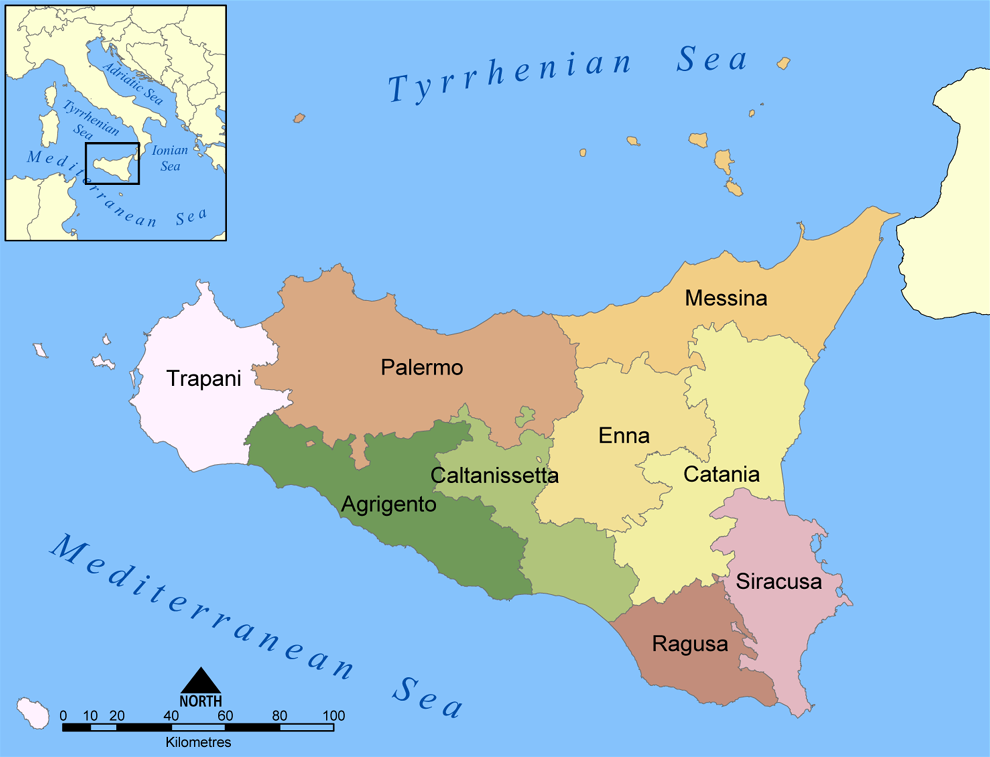
Provinces of Sicily

Administratively, Sicily is divided into 3 metropolitan cities and 6 free municipal consortiums (libero consorzio comunale), each with a capital city of the same name as the province. Small surrounding islands are also part of various Sicilian provinces: the Aeolian Islands (Messina), isle of Ustica (Palermo), Aegadian Islands (Trapani), isle of Pantelleria (Trapani) and Pelagian Islands (Agrigento).

Province	Population (2026)	Area (km^{2})	Density	Municipalities
Agrigento	407,041	3,052.59	133.3	43
Caltanissetta	243,501	2,138.37	113.9	22
Catania	1,067,550	3,573.68	298.7	58
Enna	151,525	2,574.70	58.9	20
Messina	594,074	3,266.12	181.9	108
Palermo	1,195,307	5,009.28	238.6	82
Ragusa	323,144	1,623.89	199.0	12
Syracuse	382,450	2,124.13	180.1	21
Trapani	410,602	2,469.62	166.3	25

== Economy ==
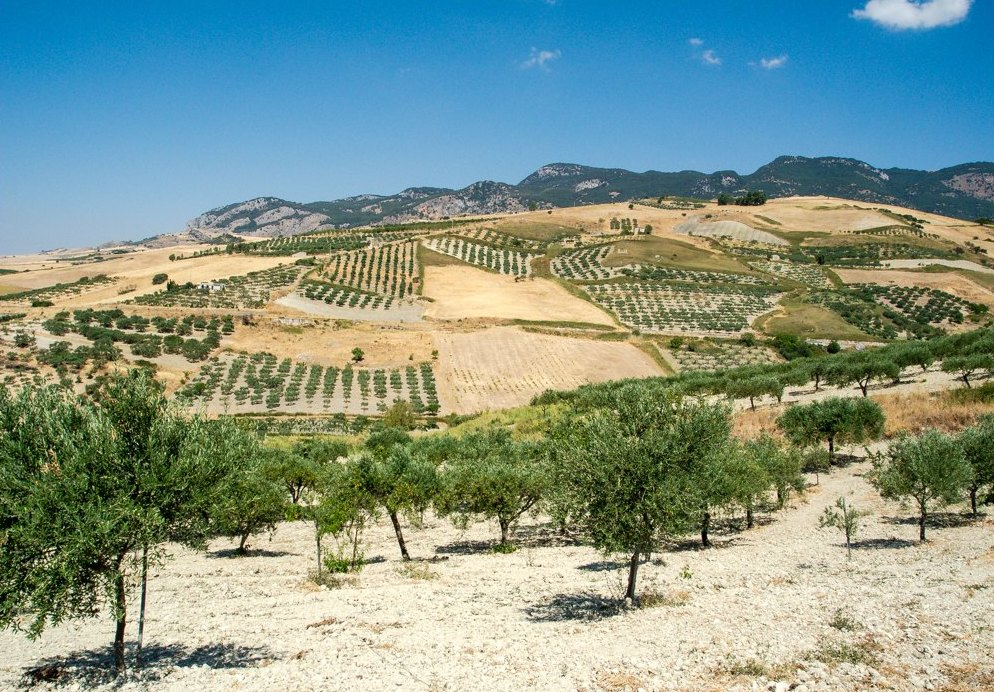
Olive groves

Thanks to regular growth, Sicily is the eighth largest regional economy of Italy in terms of total GDP (see List of Italian regions by GDP). A series of reforms and investments in agriculture, such as the introduction of modern irrigation systems, has made this important industry competitive. In the 1970s, some factories were opened, resulting in growth in the industrial sector. In recent years the service industry has become more important due to the opening of several shopping malls and some modest growth in financial and telecommunication activities. Tourism is an important source of income for the island, which attracts visitors due to its rich natural and historical heritage. Today Sicily is investing a large amount of money into the development of its hospitality industry, to attract even more tourism. However, Sicily continues to have a GDP per capita below the Italian average, and higher unemployment than the rest of Italy.

=== Agriculture ===
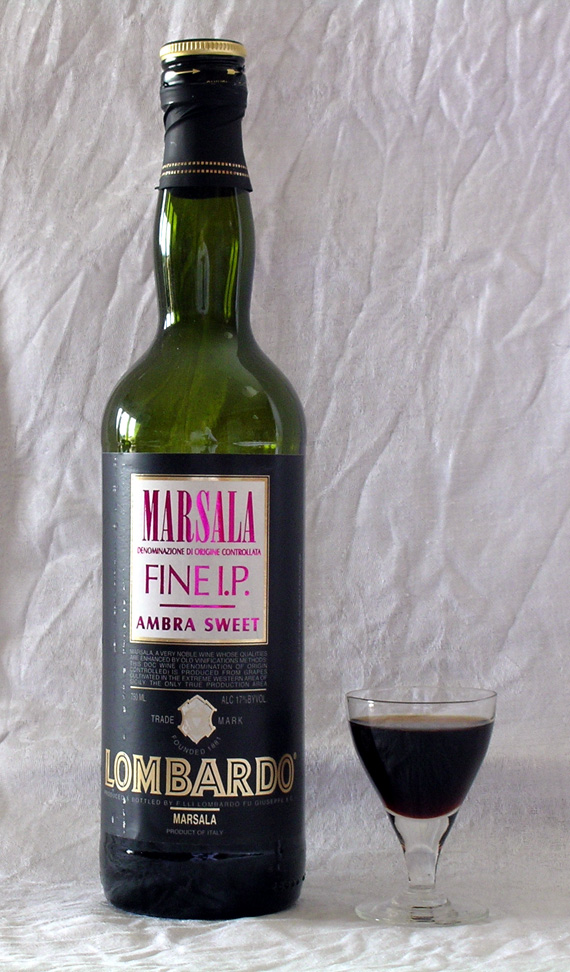
A sample of Marsala, a DOC wine produced in the city of Marsala

Sicily has long been noted for its fertile soil, which is the result of past volcanic eruptions. The local agriculture is also helped by the pleasant climate of the island. The main agricultural products are wheat, citrons, oranges (Arancia Rossa di Sicilia IGP), lemons, tomatoes (Pomodoro di Pachino IGP), olives, olive oil, artichokes, prickly pear (Fico d'India dell'Etna DOP), almonds, grapes, pistachios (Pistacchio di Bronte DOP) and wine. Cattle and sheep are raised. The production of cheese is particularly important thanks to the Ragusano DOP and the Pecorino Siciliano DOP. Ragusa is noted for its honey (Miele Ibleo) and chocolate (Cioccolato di Modica IGP) products.

Sicily is the third largest wine producer in Italy, after Veneto and Emilia Romagna (and Italy is the world's largest wine producer). The region is known mainly for fortified Marsala wines. In recent decades the wine industry has improved, new winemakers are experimenting with less-well-known native varieties, and Sicilian wines have become better known. The best known local variety is Nero d'Avola named after Avola, a town not far from Syracuse. Other important native varieties are: Nerello Mascalese, used to make the Etna Rosso DOC wine; Frappato, a component of the Cerasuolo di Vittoria DOCG wine; Moscato di Pantelleria (also known as Zibibbo), which is used to make different Pantelleria wines; Malvasia di Lipari, used for the Malvasia di Lipari DOC wine; and Catarratto, mostly used to make a white wine, Alcamo DOC. Furthermore, in Sicily, high-quality wines are also produced using non-native varieties like Syrah, Chardonnay and Merlot.

Sicily is also known for its liqueurs, such as Amaro Averna, produced in Caltanissetta, and the local limoncello.

Fishing is another fundamental resource for Sicily. It has important tuna, sardine, swordfish and European anchovy fisheries. Mazara del Vallo is the largest fishing centre in Sicily and one of the most important in Italy.

=== Industry and manufacturing ===
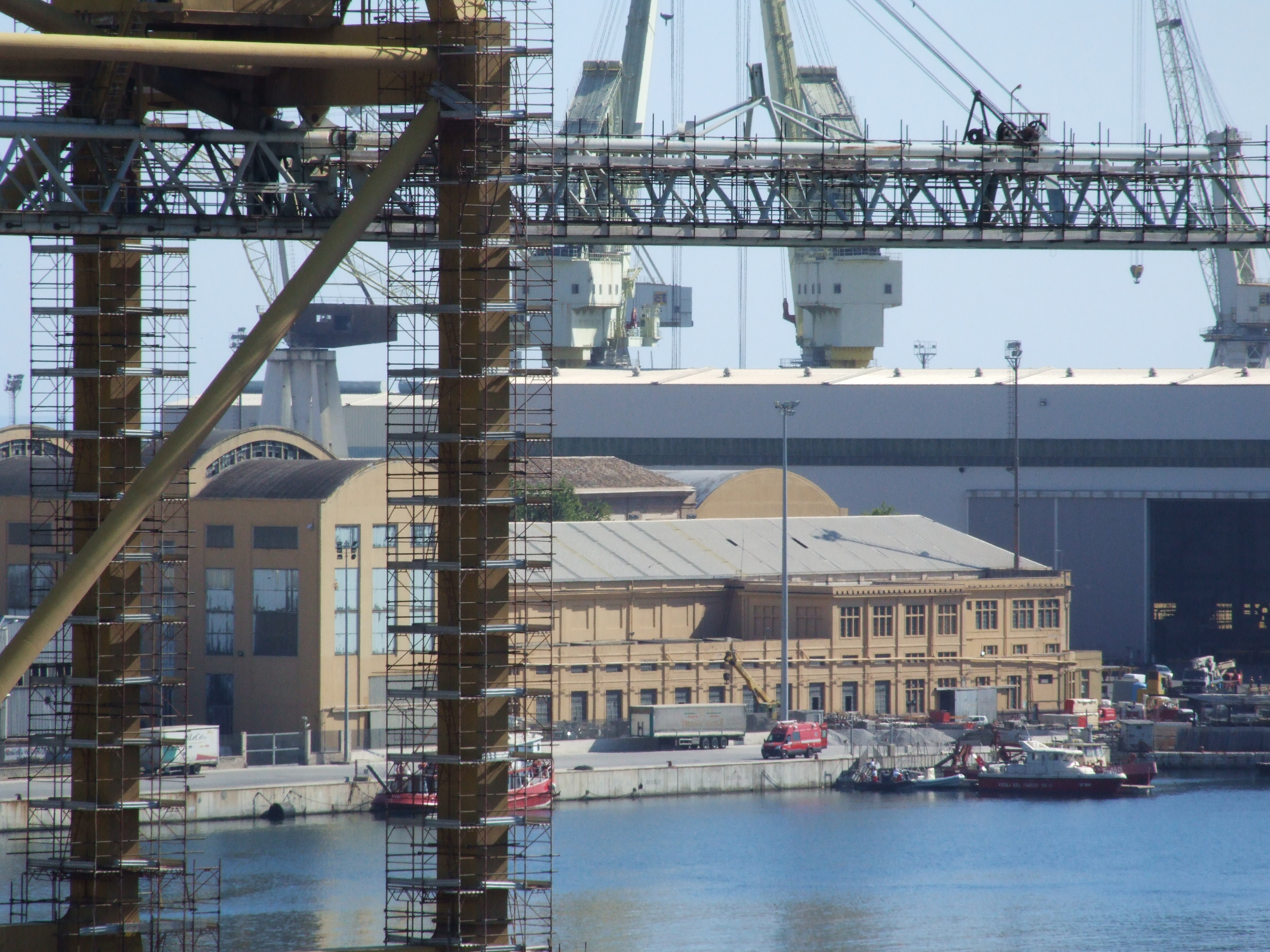
Palermo shipyards

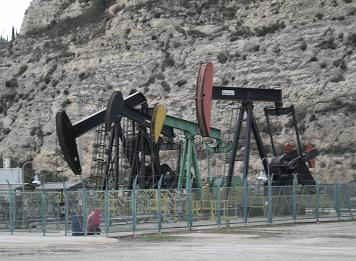
Oilfields near Ragusa

Improvements in Sicily's road system have helped to promote industrial development. The region has three important industrial districts:

- Catania Industrial District, where there are several food industries and one of the best European electronics industry centres called Etna Valley (in honour of the best known Silicon Valley.) It contains offices and factories of international companies such as STMicroelectronics and Numonyx;
- Syracuse Petrochemical District with chemical industries, oil refineries and important power stations (as the innovative Archimede combined cycle power plant);
- the latest Enna Industrial District in which there are food industries.

In Palermo there are important shipyards (such as Fincantieri), mechanical factories of famous Italian companies as Ansaldo Breda, publishing and textile industries. Chemical industries are also in the Province of Messina (Milazzo) and in the Province of Caltanissetta (Gela). There are petroleum, natural gas and asphalt fields in the Southeast (mostly near Ragusa) and massive deposits of halite in Central Sicily. The Province of Trapani is one of the largest sea salt producers in Italy.

=== Statistics ===
==== GDP growth ====
Sicily's GDP (nominal and per capita) growth between 2000 and 2008 was as follows:

	2000	2001	2002	2003	2004	2005	2006	2008
Gross Domestic Product (Millions of Euros)	67,204	70,530	72,855	75,085	77,327	80,358	82,938	88,328
GDP (PPP) per capita (Euro)	13,479	14,185	14,662	15,053	15,440	16,023	16,531	17,533

==== Economic sectors ====
Sectors of the Sicilian economy in 2006:

Economic activity	GDP € millions	% sector (Sicily)	% sector (Italy)
Agriculture, farming, fishing	2,923.3	3.52%	1.84%
Industry	7,712.9	9.30%	18.30%
Constructions	4,582.1	5.52%	5.41%
Commerce, hotels and restaurants, transport, services and (tele)communications	15,159.7	18.28%	20.54%
Financial activity and real estate	17,656.1	21.29%	24.17%
Other economic activities	24,011.5	28.95%	18.97%
VAT and other forms of taxes	10,893.1	13.13%	10.76%
GDP of Sicily	82,938.6		

==== Unemployment rate ====
The unemployment rate was 21.5% in 2018 and was one of the highest in Italy and Europe.

Year	2006	2007	2008	2009	2010	2011	2012	2013	2014	2015	2016	2017	2018
Unemployment rate	13.4%	12.9%	13.7%	13.8%	14.6%	14.3%	18.4%	21.0%	22.2%	21.4%	22.1%	21.5%	21.5%

== Transport ==
=== Roads ===
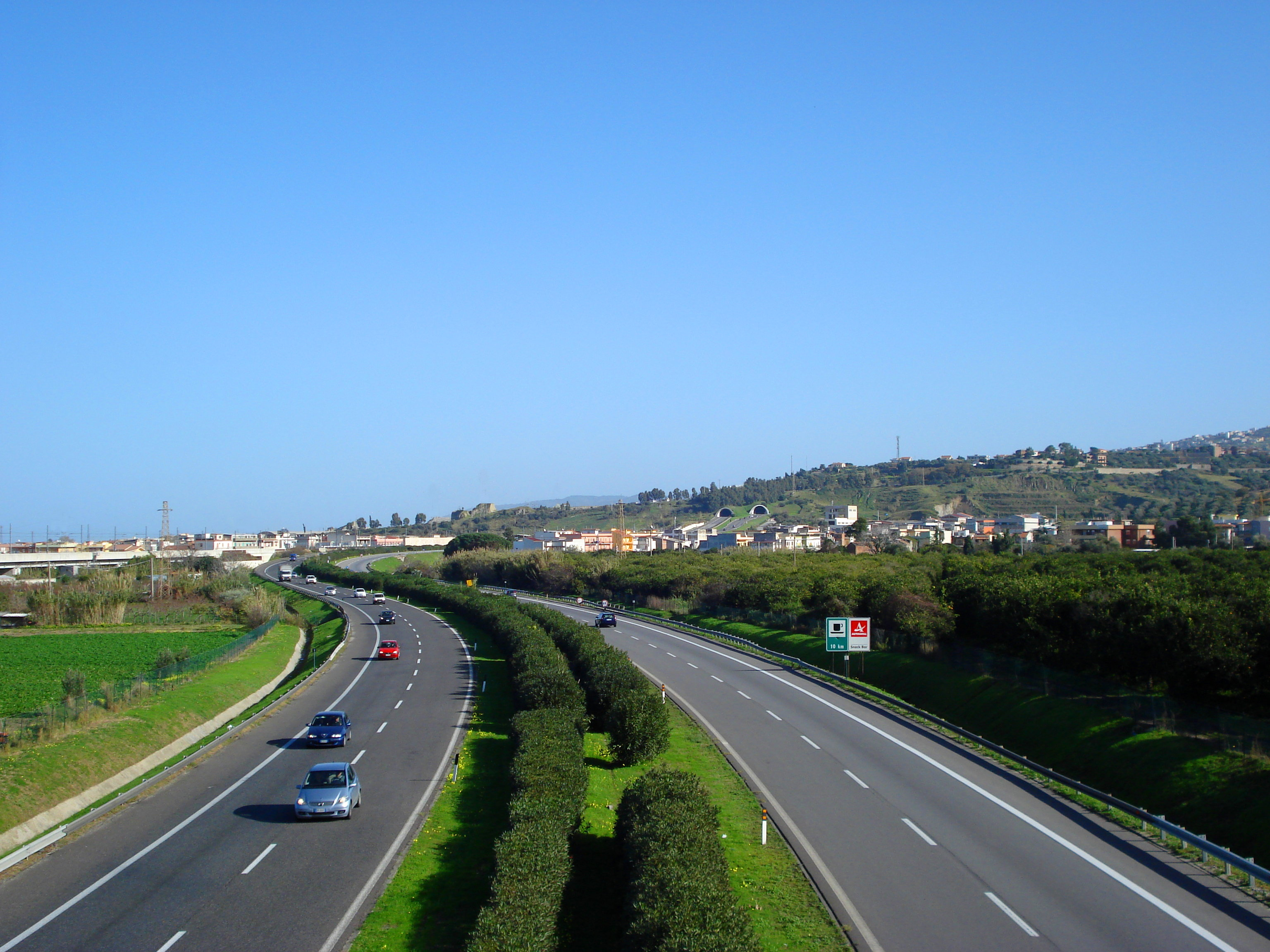
The A20 Messina-Palermo motorway near Torregrotta

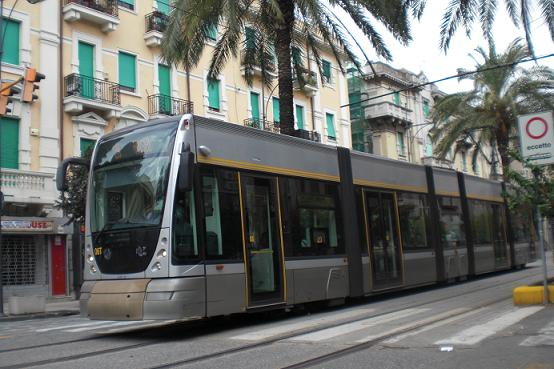
Messina tramway system

Highways have been built and expanded in the last four decades. The most prominent Sicilian roads are the motorways (known as autostrade) in the north of the island. Much of the motorway network is elevated on pillars due to the island's mountainous terrain. Other main roads in Sicily are the Strade Statali, such as the SS.113 that connects Trapani to Messina (via Palermo), the SS.114 Messina-Syracuse (via Catania) and the SS.115 Syracuse-Trapani (via Ragusa, Gela and Agrigento).

Sign	Motorway	Length	Toll	Services
	A18 Messina-Catania	76 km (47 mi)	Yes	Yes
	RA15 Catania's Bypass (West)	24 km (15 mi)	Free	Yes
	Motorway Catania-Siracusa	25 km (16 mi)	Free	No
	A18 Siracusa-Rosolini	40 km (25 mi)	Free	No
	A19 Palermo-Catania	199 km (124 mi)	Free	Yes
	A20 Palermo-Messina	181 km (112 mi)	Yes	Yes
	A29 Palermo-Mazara del Vallo	119 km (74 mi)	Free	No
	A29dir Alcamo-Trapani/Marsala	38 km (24 mi) and 44 km (27 mi)	Free	No

=== Railways ===
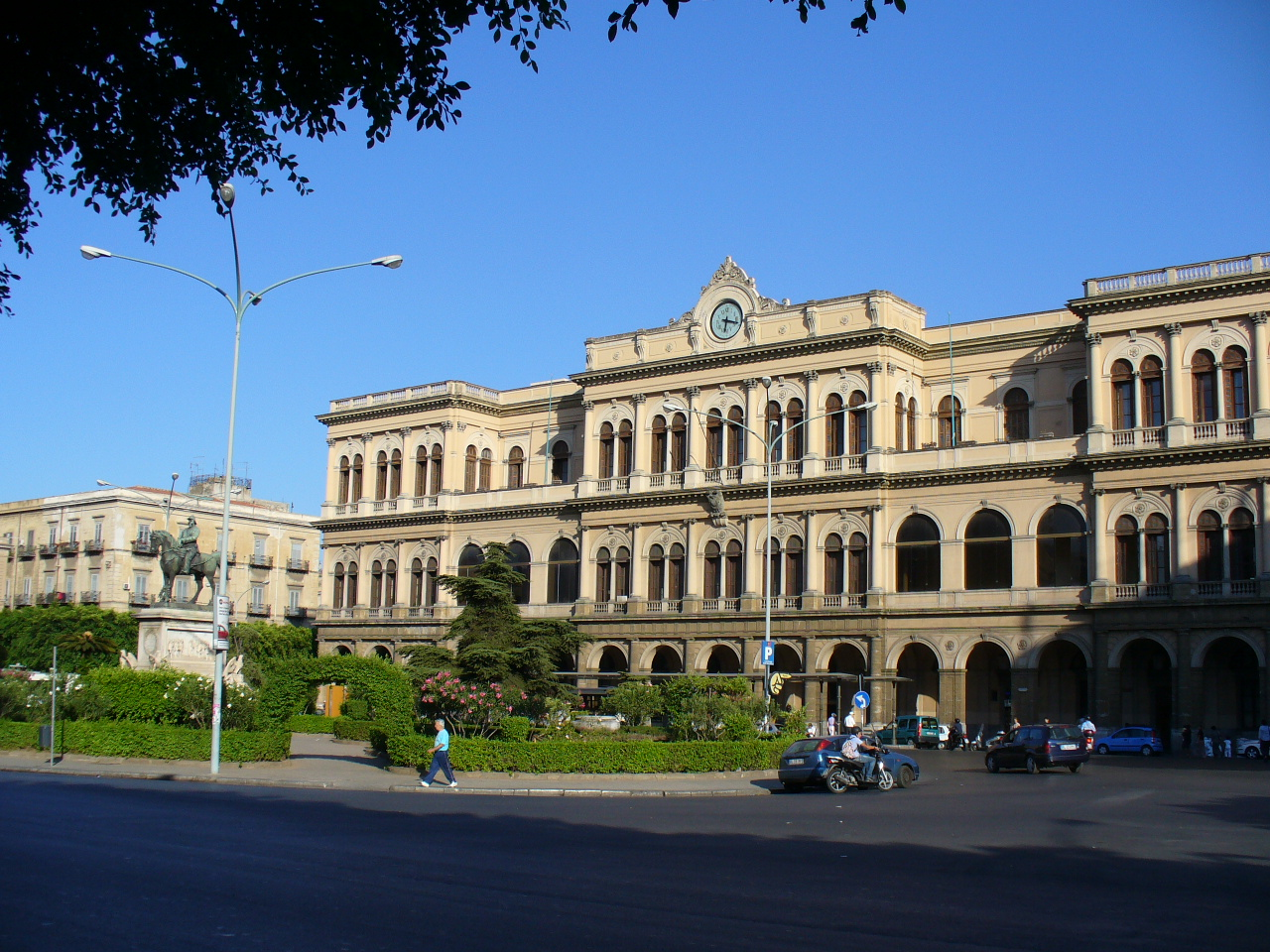
Palermo Centrale railway station

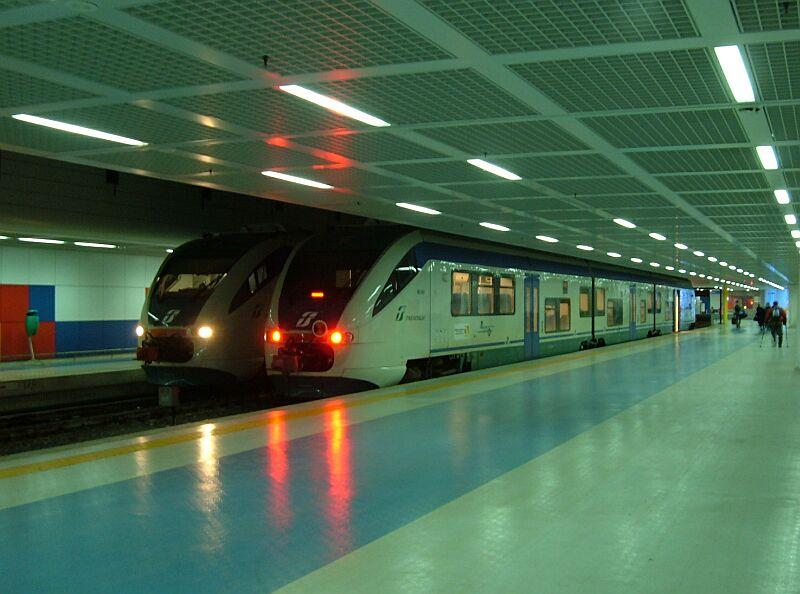
Two trains inside Punta Raisi railway station within Palermo International Airport

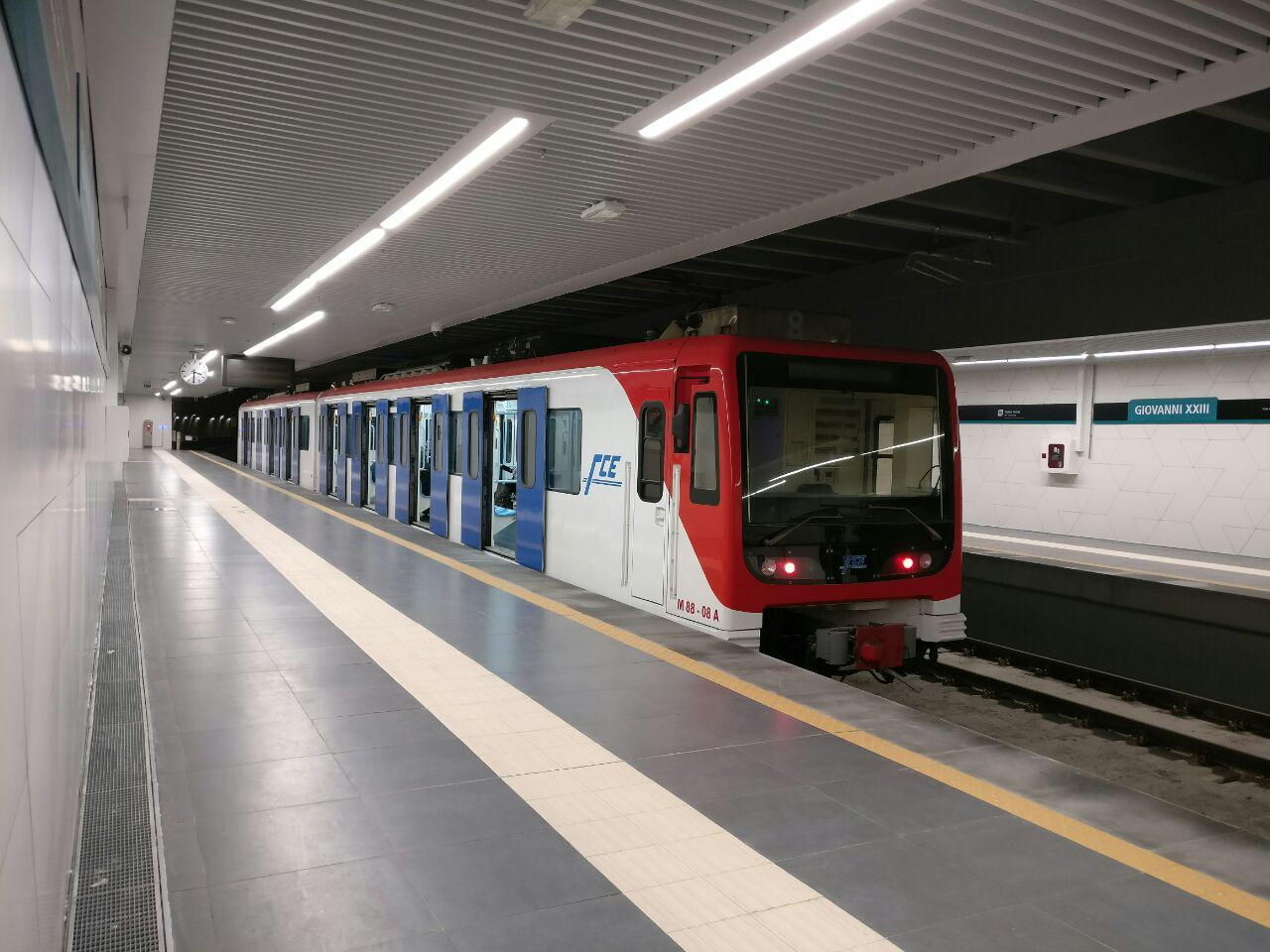
Catania Metro

The first railway in Sicily was opened in 1863 (Palermo-Bagheria) and today all of the Sicilian provinces are served by a network of railway services, linking to most major cities and towns; this service is operated by Trenitalia. Of the 1,378 km (856 mi) of railway tracks in use, over 60% has been electrified whilst the remaining 583 km (362 mi) are serviced by diesel engines. 88% of the lines (1.209 km) are single-track and only 169 km (105 mi) are double-track serving the two main routes, Messina-Palermo (Tyrrhenian) and Messina-Catania-Syracuse (Ionian), which are the main lines of this region. Of the narrow-gauge railways the Ferrovia Circumetnea is the only one that still operates, going round Mount Etna. From the major cities of Sicily, there are services to Naples, Rome and Milan; this is achieved by the trains being loaded onto ferries which cross the Strait.

In Catania there is an underground railway service (metropolitana di Catania); in Palermo the national railway operator Trenitalia operates a commuter rail (Palermo metropolitan railway service), the Sicilian Capital is also served by 4 AMAT (Comunal Public Transport Operator) tramlines; Messina is served by a tramline.

=== Airports ===
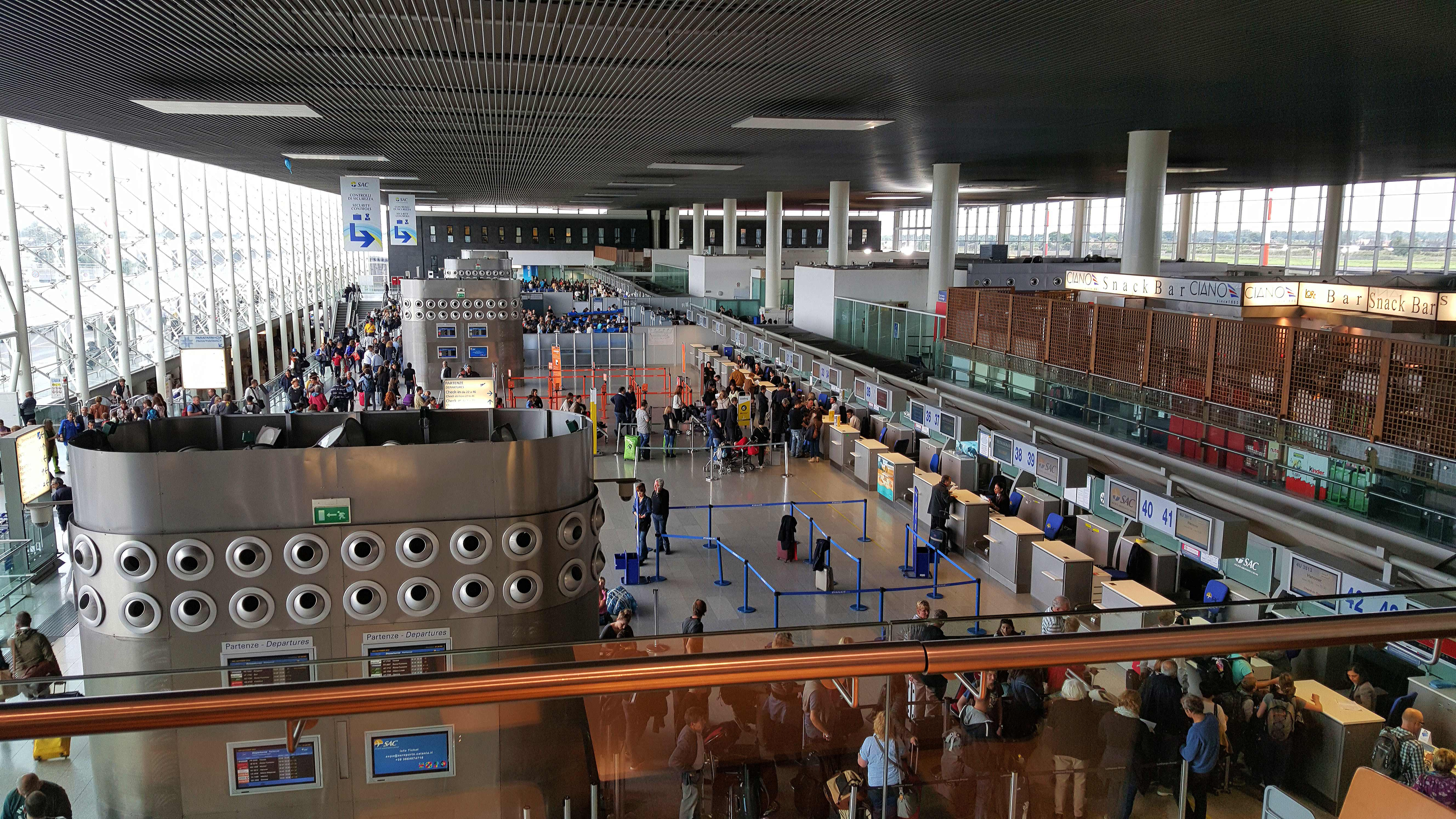
Catania International Airport

Sicily has several airports that serve numerous Italian and European destinations and some extra-European.

- Catania-Fontanarossa Airport, located on the east coast, is the busiest on the island (and one of the busiest in all of Italy).
- Palermo International Airport, which is also a substantially large airport with many national and international flights.
- Trapani-Birgi Airport, a military-civil joint-use airport (third for traffic on the island). Recently the airport has seen an increase in traffic thanks to the low-cost carrier Ryanair.
- Comiso-Ragusa Airport, has recently been refurbished and re-converted from military use to a civil airport. It was opened to commercial traffic and general aviation on 30 May 2013.
- Palermo-Boccadifalco Airport is the old airport of Palermo and is currently used for general aviation and as a base for the Guardia di Finanza and police helicopters.
- NAS Sigonella Airport, it is an Italian Air Force and US Navy installation.
- Lampedusa Airport.
- Pantelleria Airport.

=== Ports ===
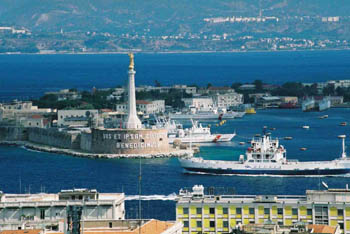
Port of Messina

By sea, Sicily is served by several ferry routes and cargo ports, and in all major cities, cruise ships dock on a regular basis.

- Mainland Italy: Ports connecting to the mainland are Messina (route to Villa San Giovanni and Salerno), the busiest passenger port in Italy, Palermo (routes to Genoa, Civitavecchia and Naples) and Catania (route to Naples).
- Sicily's small surrounding islands: The port of Milazzo serves the Aeolian Islands, the ports of Trapani and Marsala the Aegadian Islands and the port of Porto Empedocle the Pelagian Islands. From Palermo there is a service to the island of Ustica and to Sardinia.
- International connections: From Palermo and Trapani there are weekly services to Tunisia and there is also a daily service between Malta and Pozzallo.
- Commercial and cargo ports: The port of Augusta is the fifth-largest cargo port in Italy and handles tonnes of goods. Other major cargo ports are Palermo, Catania, Trapani, Pozzallo and Termini Imerese.
- Touristic ports: Several ports along the Sicilian coast are in the service of private boats that need to moor on the island. The main ports for this traffic are in Marina di Ragusa, Riposto, Portorosa, Syracuse, Cefalù and Sciacca. In Sicily, Palermo is also a major centre for boat rental, with or without crew, in the Mediterranean.
- Fishing ports: Like all islands, Sicily also has many fishing ports. The most important is in Mazara del Vallo followed by Castellamare del Golfo, Licata, Scoglitti and Portopalo di Capo Passero.

=== Strait of Messina Bridge ===
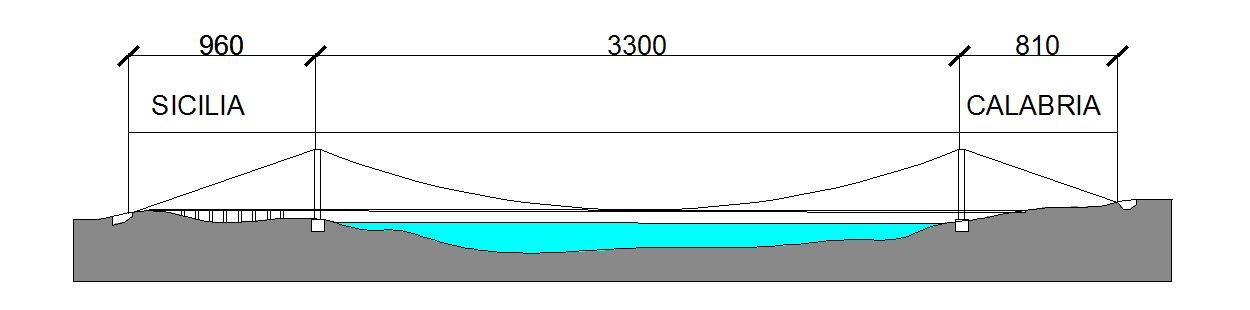
Cross-sectional diagram of the Strait of Messina Bridge

The Strait of Messina Bridge is a proposed 3.6 km (2.2 mi) suspension bridge across the Strait of Messina, connecting Torre Faro in Sicily with Villa San Giovanni on the Italian peninsula.

While a bridge across the Strait of Messina had been proposed since ancient times, the first detailed plan was made in the 1990s for a suspension bridge. The project was cancelled in 2006 under prime minister Romano Prodi. On 6 March 2009, as part of a massive new public works programme, prime minister Silvio Berlusconi's government announced that construction of the Messina Bridge would indeed go ahead, pledging €1.3 billion as a contribution to the total cost, estimated at €6.1 billion. The project was cancelled again on 26 February 2013, by prime minister Mario Monti's government, due to budget constraints. A decade later, the project was revived again with a decree by Giorgia Meloni's government, on 16 March 2023, which received presidential approval on 31 March 2023.

The bridge was fully approved by the Meloni government in August 2025, with construction set to begin in the autumn of 2025. It will be the longest suspension bridge in the world when it opens in 2032. The bridge would also be part of the Berlin–Palermo railway axis (Line 1) of the Trans-European Transport Networks (TEN-T).

== Tourism ==
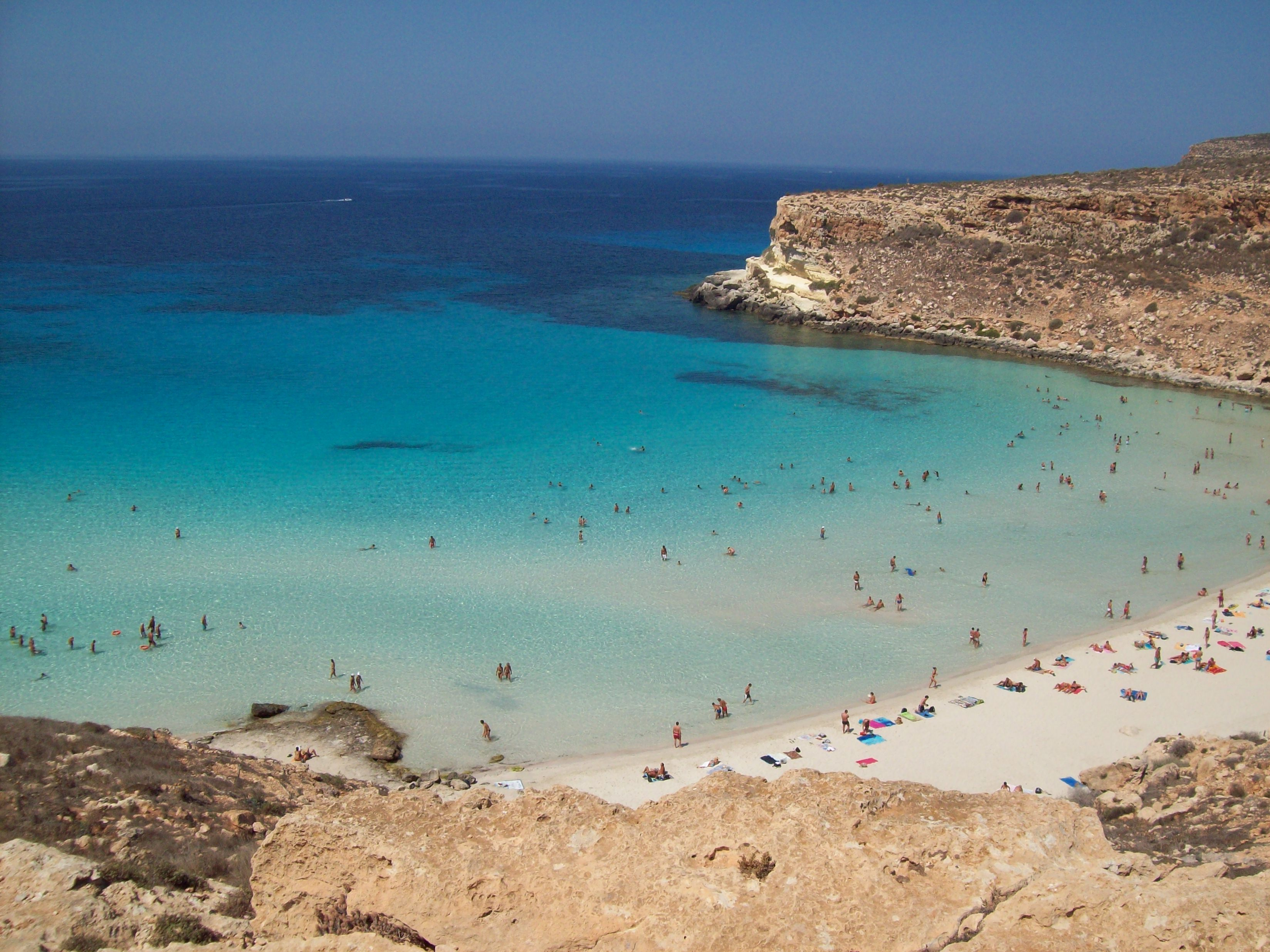
Lampedusa, Pelagian Islands

Sicily's sunny, dry climate, scenery, cuisine, history, and architecture attract many tourists from the rest of Italy and abroad. The tourist season peaks in the summer months, although people visit the island all year round. Mount Etna, the beaches, the archaeological sites, and major cities such as Palermo, Catania, Syracuse and Ragusa are the favourite tourist destinations, but the old town of Taormina and the neighbouring seaside resort of Giardini Naxos draw visitors from all over the world, as do the Aeolian Islands, Erice, Terrasini, Castellammare del Golfo, Cefalù, Agrigento, the Pelagian Islands and Capo d'Orlando. The last features some of the best-preserved temples of the ancient Greek period. Many Mediterranean cruise ships stop in Sicily, and many wine tourists also visit the island.

Some scenes of several Hollywood and Cinecittà films were shot in Sicily. This increased the attraction of Sicily as a tourist destination.

=== UNESCO World Heritage Sites ===
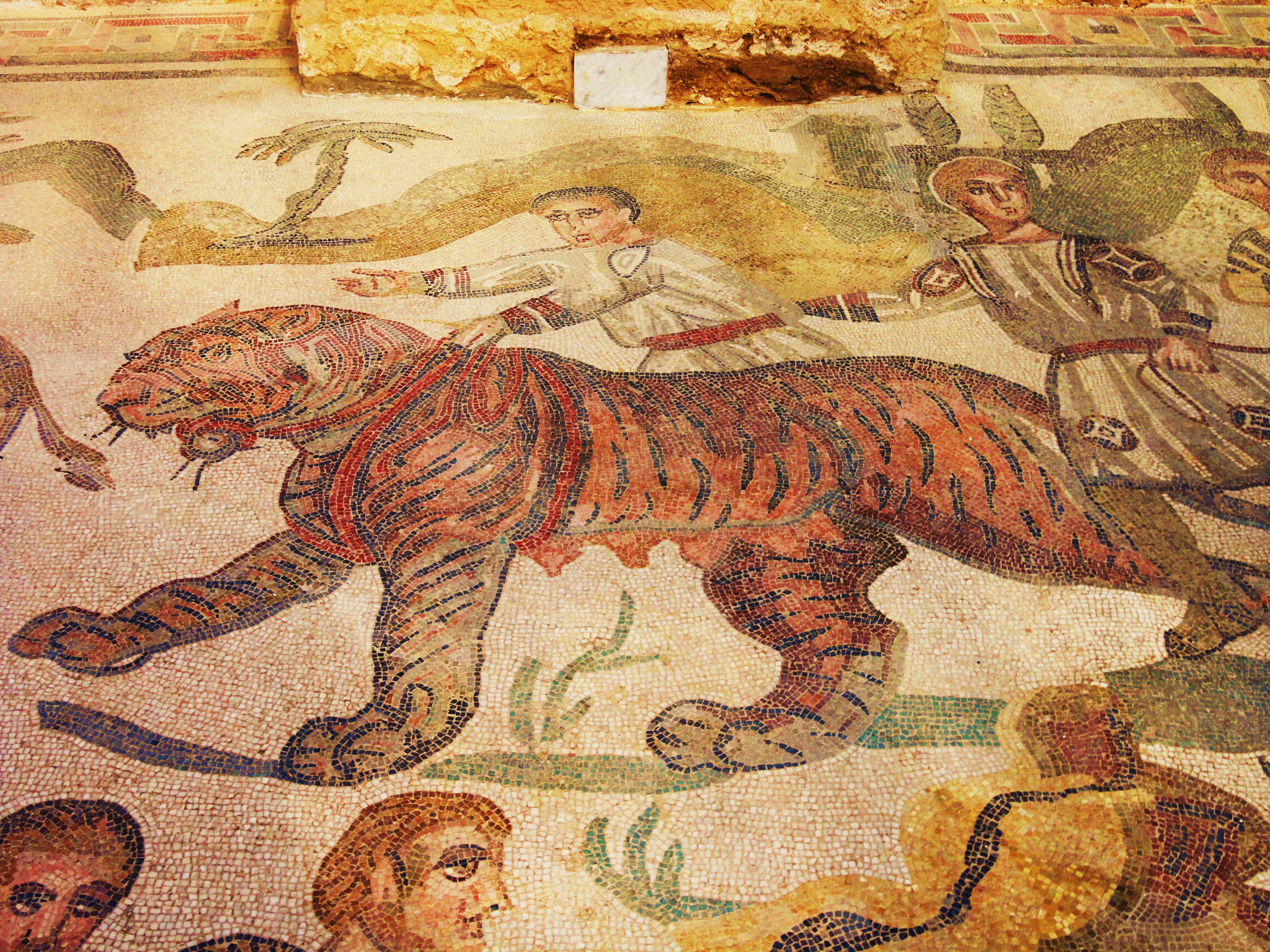
One of the mosaics in Villa Romana del Casale, a large and elaborate Roman villa or palace located about 3 km from the town of Piazza Armerina

There are seven UNESCO World Heritage Sites on Sicily. By the order of inscription:

- Valle dei Templi (1997) is one of the most outstanding examples of Magna Graecia art and architecture, and is one of the main attractions of Sicily as well as a national monument of Italy. The site is located in Agrigento.
- Villa Romana del Casale (1997) is a Roman villa built in the first quarter of the 4th century and located about 3 km (2 mi) outside the town of Piazza Armerina. It contains the richest, largest and most complex collection of Roman mosaics in the world.
- Aeolian Islands (2000) are a volcanic archipelago in the Tyrrhenian Sea, named after the demigod of the winds Aeolus. The Aeolian Islands are a tourist destination in the summer, and attract up to 200,000 visitors annually.
- Late Baroque Towns of the Val di Noto (2002) "represent the culmination and final flowering of Baroque art in Europe". It includes several towns: Caltagirone, Militello in Val di Catania, Catania, Modica, Noto, Palazzolo Acreide, Ragusa and Scicli.
- Necropolis of Pantalica (2005) is a large Necropolis in Sicily with over 5,000 tombs dating from the 13th to the 7th centuries BC. Syracuse is notable for its rich Greek history, culture, amphitheatres and architecture. They are situated in south-eastern Sicily.
- Mount Etna (2013) is one of the most active volcanoes in the world and is in an almost constant state of activity and generated myths, legends and naturalistic observation from Greek, Celts and Roman classic and medieval times.
- Arab-Norman Palermo and the cathedral churches of Cefalù and Monreale; includes a series of nine civil and religious structures dating from the era of the Norman kingdom of Sicily (1130–1194)

==== Tentative UNESCO World Heritage sites ====
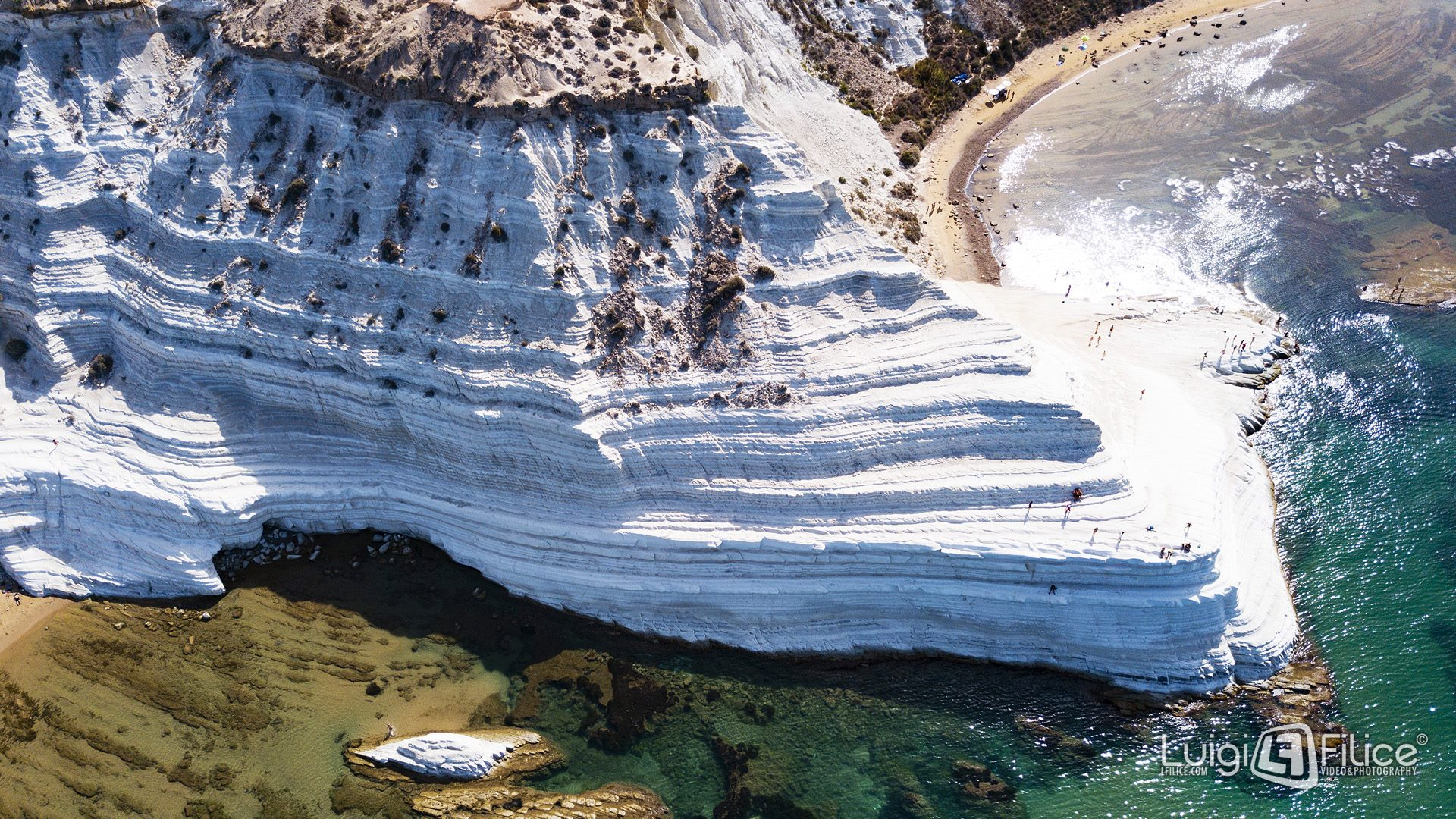
The Scala dei Turchi

- Taormina and Isola Bella
- Motya and Libeo Island: The Phoenician-Punic Civilisation in Italy
- Scala dei Turchi
- Strait of Messina

=== Archaeological sites ===
Because many different cultures settled, dominated or invaded the island, Sicily has a huge variety of archaeological sites. Also, some of the most notable and best preserved temples and other structures of the Greek world are located in Sicily. Here is a short list of the major archaeological sites:

- Sicels/Sicans/Elymians/Greeks: Segesta, Eryx, Cava Ispica, Thapsos, Pantalica;
- Greeks: Syracuse, Agrigento, Segesta, Selinunte, Gela, Kamarina, Himera, Megara Hyblaea, Naxos, Heraclea Minoa;
- Phoenicians: Motya, Soluntum, Marsala, Palermo;
- Romans: Piazza Armerina, Centuripe, Taormina, Palermo;

The excavation and restoration of one of Sicily's best known archaeological sites, the Valley of the Temples in Agrigento, was at the direction of the archaeologist Domenico Antonio Lo Faso Pietrasanta, Fifth Duke of Serradifalco, known in archaeological circles simply as "Serradifalco". He also oversaw the restoration of ancient sites at Segesta, Selinunte, Siracusa and Taormina.

=== Castles ===
In Sicily there are hundreds of castles. The most prominent are:

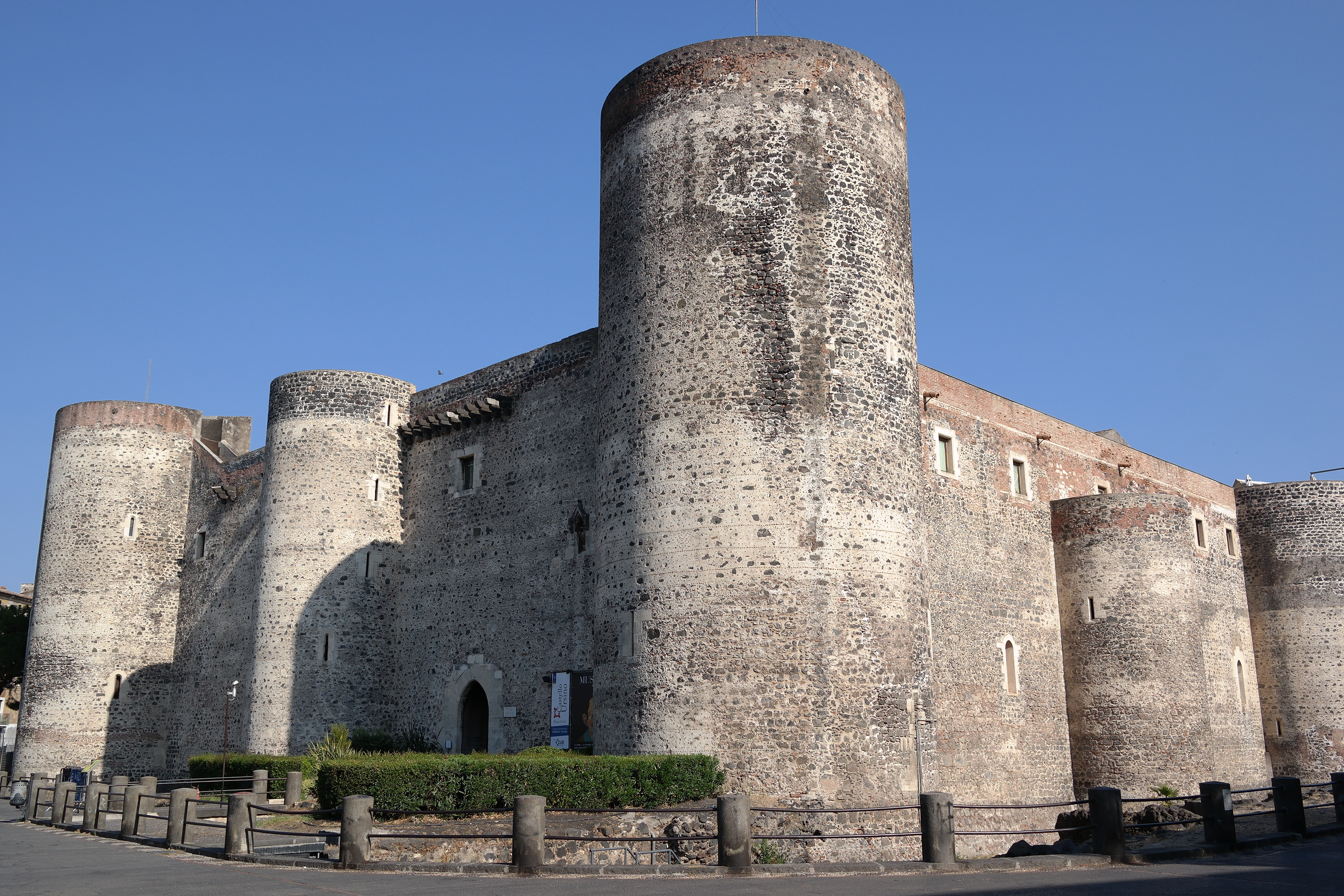
Castello Ursino in Catania

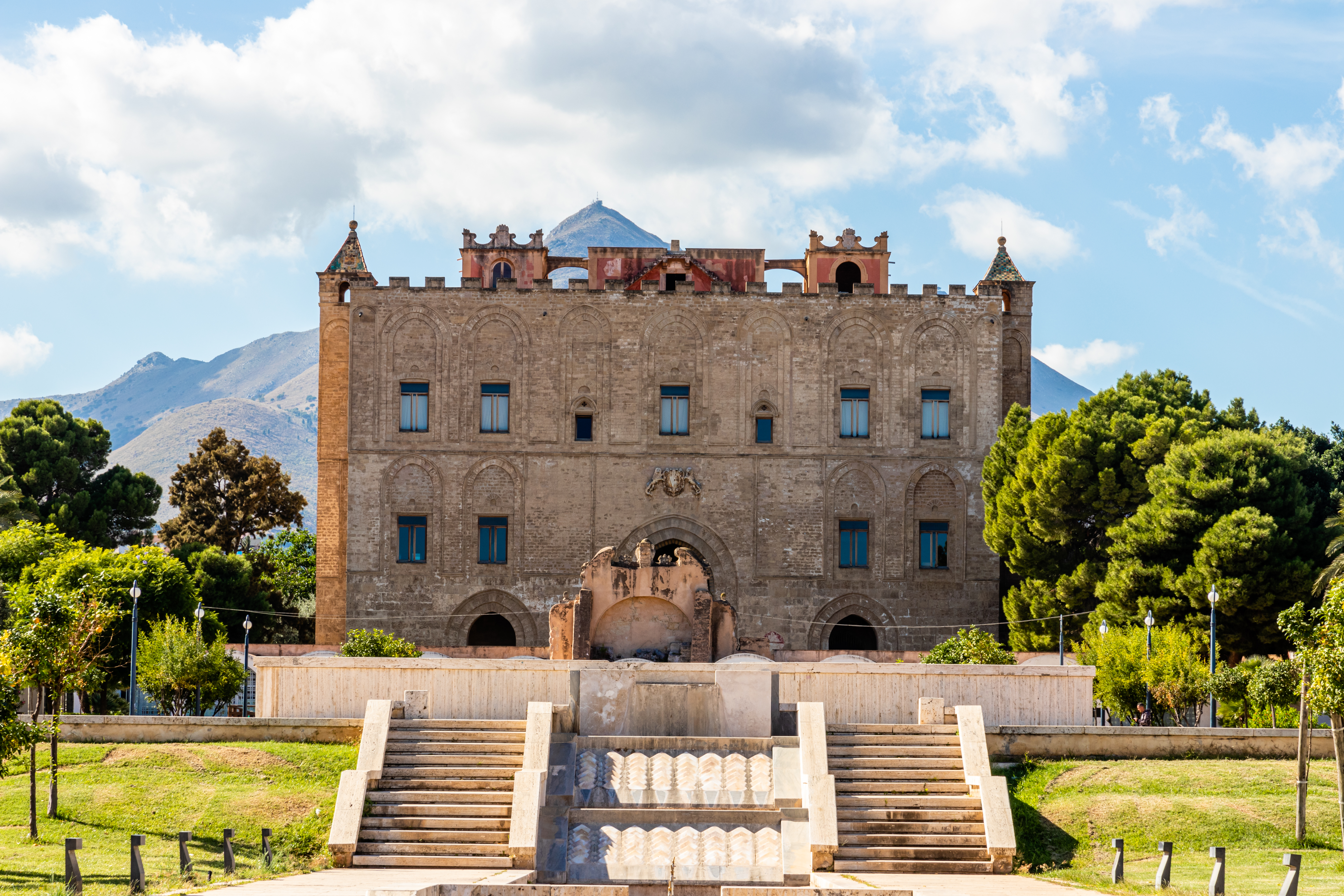
Zisa Castle in Palermo

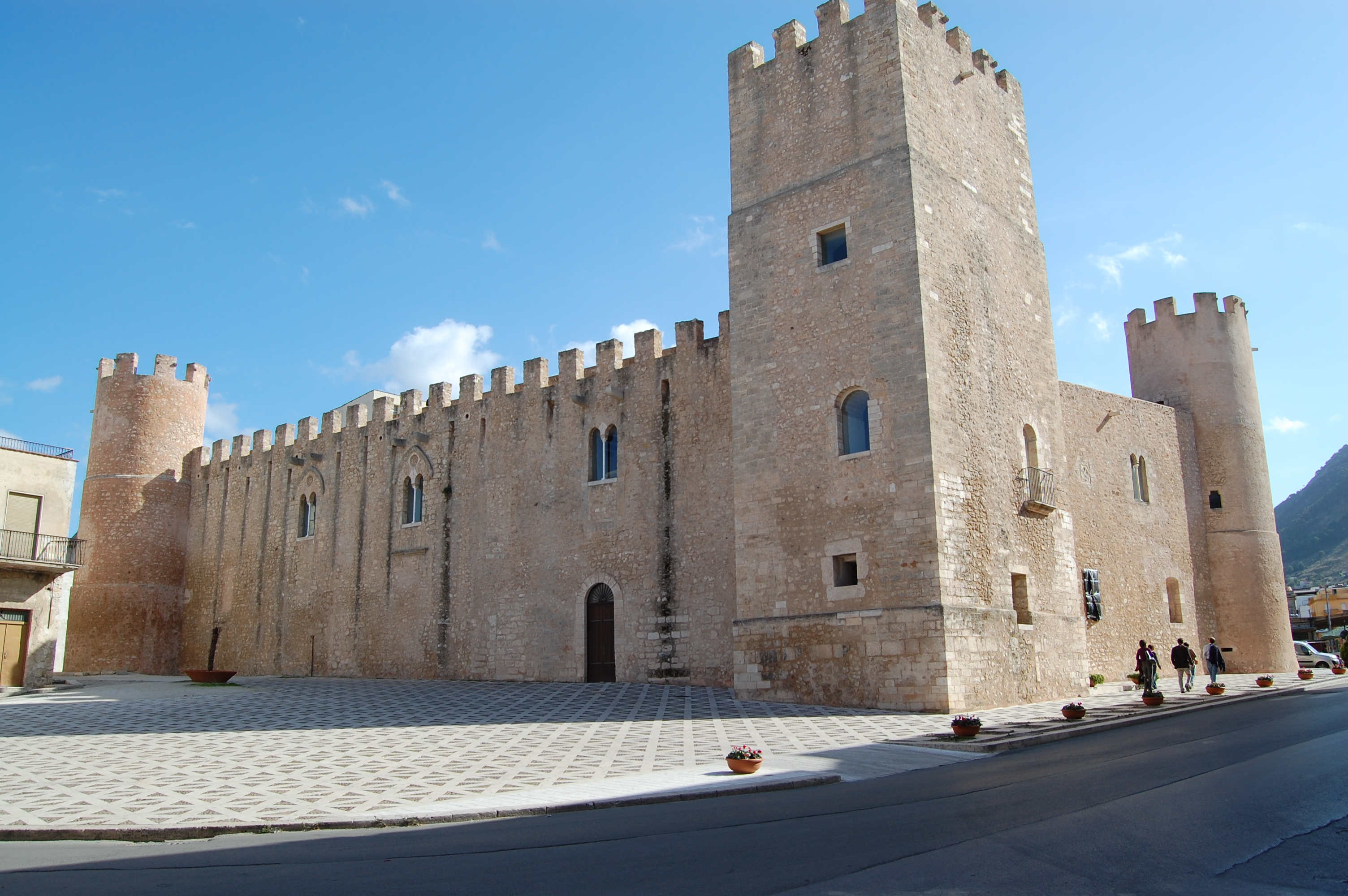
Castle of the Counts of Modica (Alcamo) in Alcamo

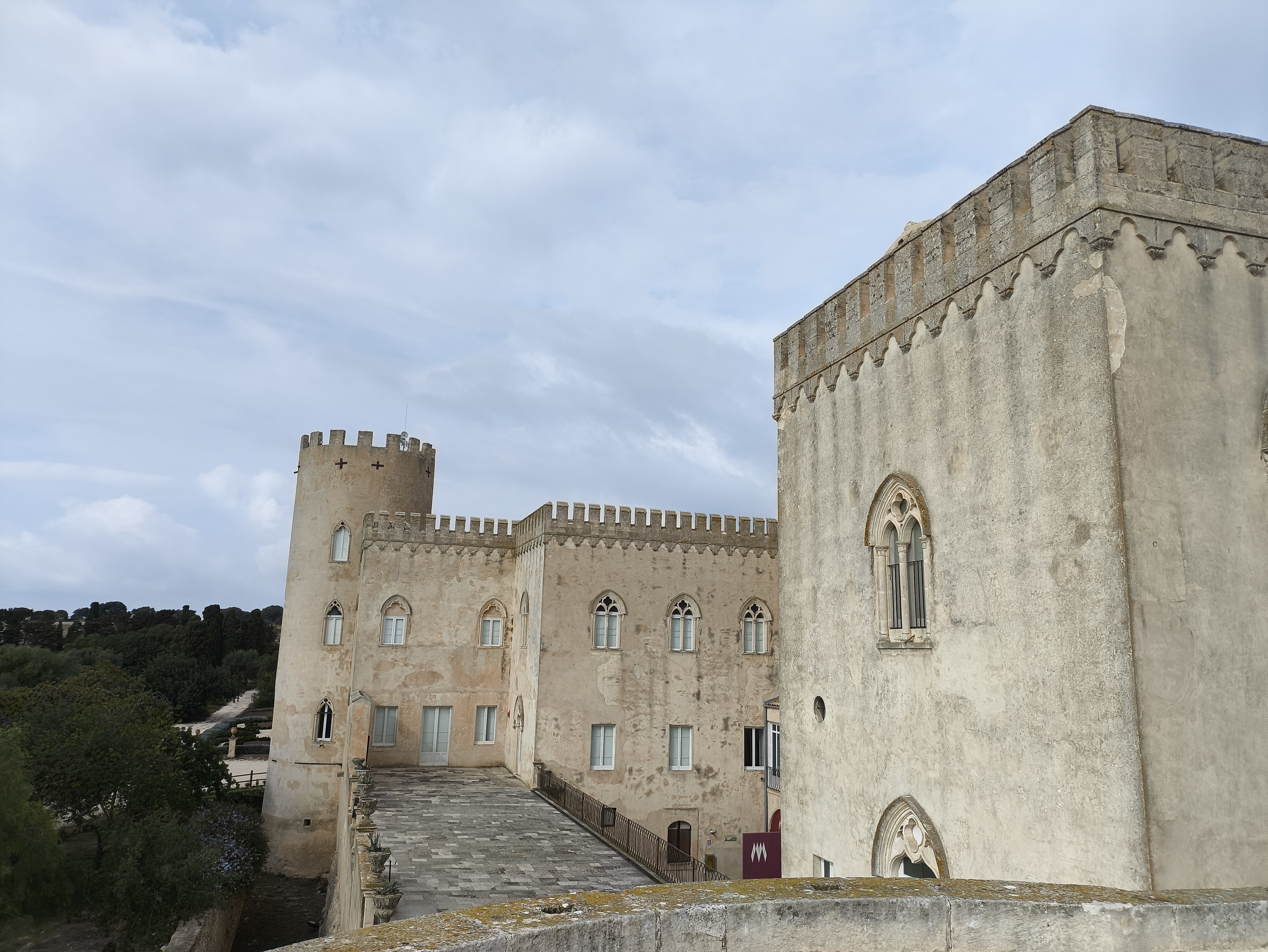
Castello di Donnafugata near Ragusa

Province	Castles	Commune
Caltanisetta	Castello Manfredonico	Mussomeli
Caltanisetta	U Cannuni	Mazzarino
Caltanisetta	Castelluccio di Gela	Gela
Catania	Castello Ursino	Catania
Catania	Castello Normanno	Adrano
Catania	Castello Normanno	Paternò
Catania	Castello di Aci	Aci Castello
Enna	Castello di Lombardia	Enna
Messina	Forte dei Centri	Messina
Messina	Castello di Milazzo	Milazzo
Messina	Castello di Federico II	Montalbano Elicona
Messina	Castello di Sant'Alessio Siculo	Sant'Alessio Siculo
Messina	Castello di Pentefur	Savoca
Messina	Castello di Schisò	Giardini Naxos
Palermo	Zisa, Palermo	Palermo
Palermo	Castello di Caccamo	Caccamo
Palermo	Castello di Carini	Carini
Palermo	Castello dei Ventimiglia	Castelbuono
Ragusa	Castello di Donnafugata	Ragusa
Ragusa	Torre Cabrera	Pozzallo
Ragusa	Castello Dei Conti	Modica
Syracuse	Castello Maniace	Syracuse
Syracuse	Castello Svevo	Augusta
Trapani	Castle of Venus	Erice
Trapani	Castle of the Counts of Modica	Alcamo
Trapani	Castle of Calatubo	Alcamo

=== Coastal towers ===
The coastal towers in Sicily (Torri costiere della Sicilia) are 218 old watchtowers along the coast. In Sicily, the first coastal towers date back to the late Norman period. From 1360 the threat came from the south, from North Africa to Maghreb, mainly to Barbary pirates and corsairs of Barbary Coast. In 1516, the Turks settled in Algiers, and from 1520, the corsair Hayreddin Barbarossa under the command of Ottoman Empire operated from that harbour.

Most existing towers were built on architectural designs of the Florentine architect Camillo Camilliani from 1583 to 1584 and involved the coastal periple of Sicily. The typology changed completely in '800, because of the new higher fire volumes of cannon vessels, the towers were built on the type of Martello towers that the British built in the UK and elsewhere in the British Empire. The decline of Mediterranean piracy caused by the Second Barbary War led to a smaller number of coastal towers built during the 19th century.

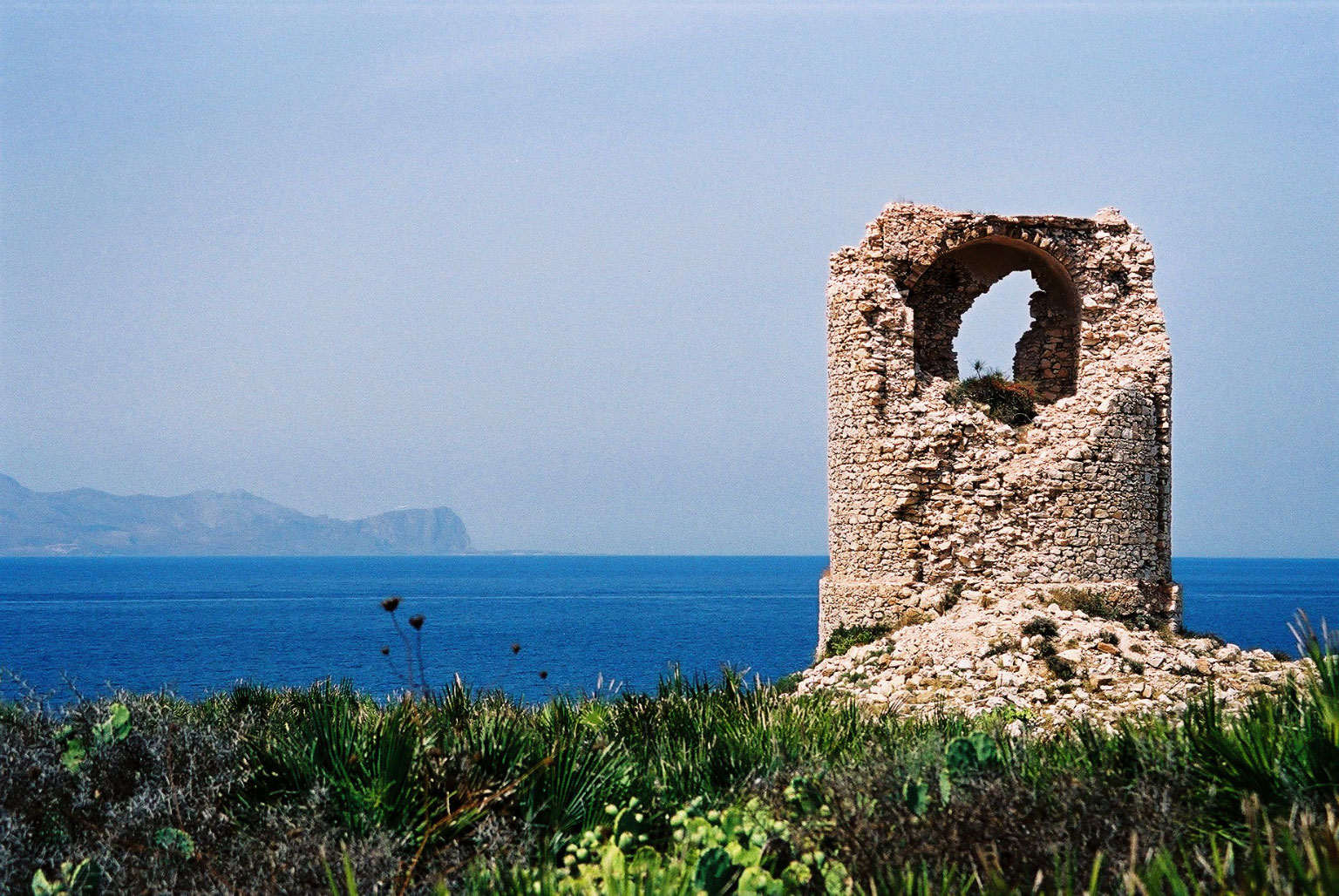
Torre-Capo-Rama (Terrasini)

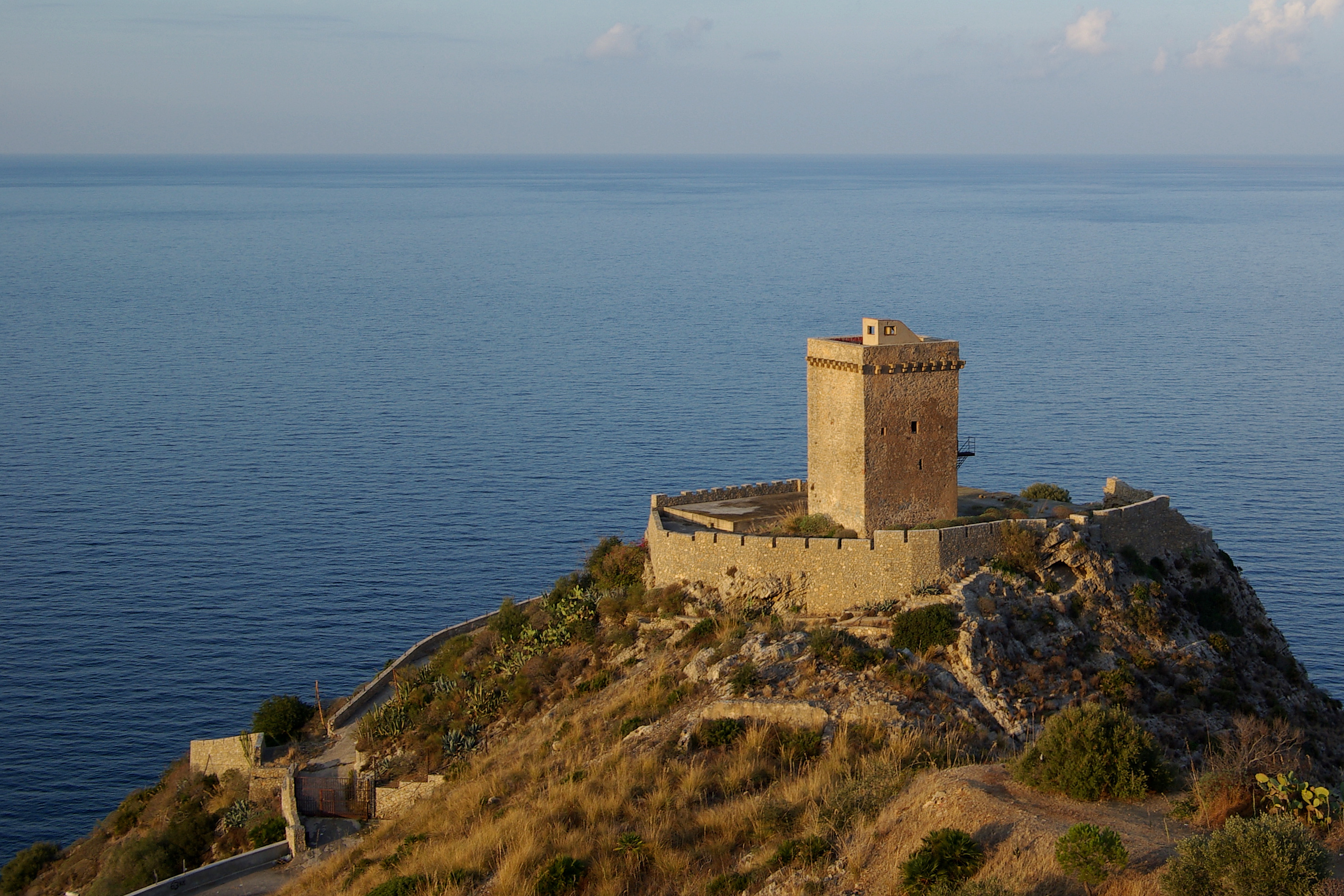
Torre Normanna (Altavilla Milicia)

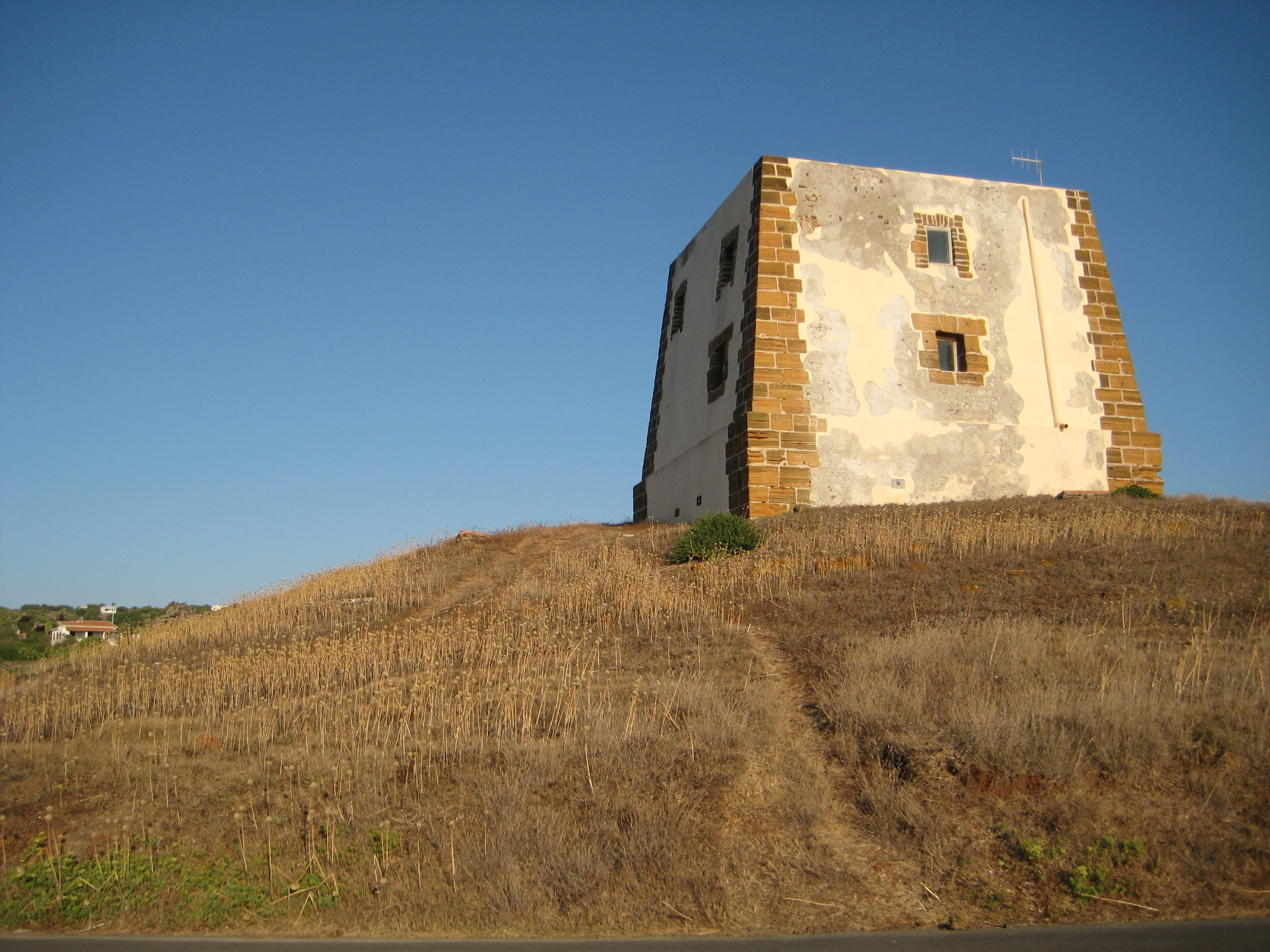
Torre Spalmatore (Ustica)

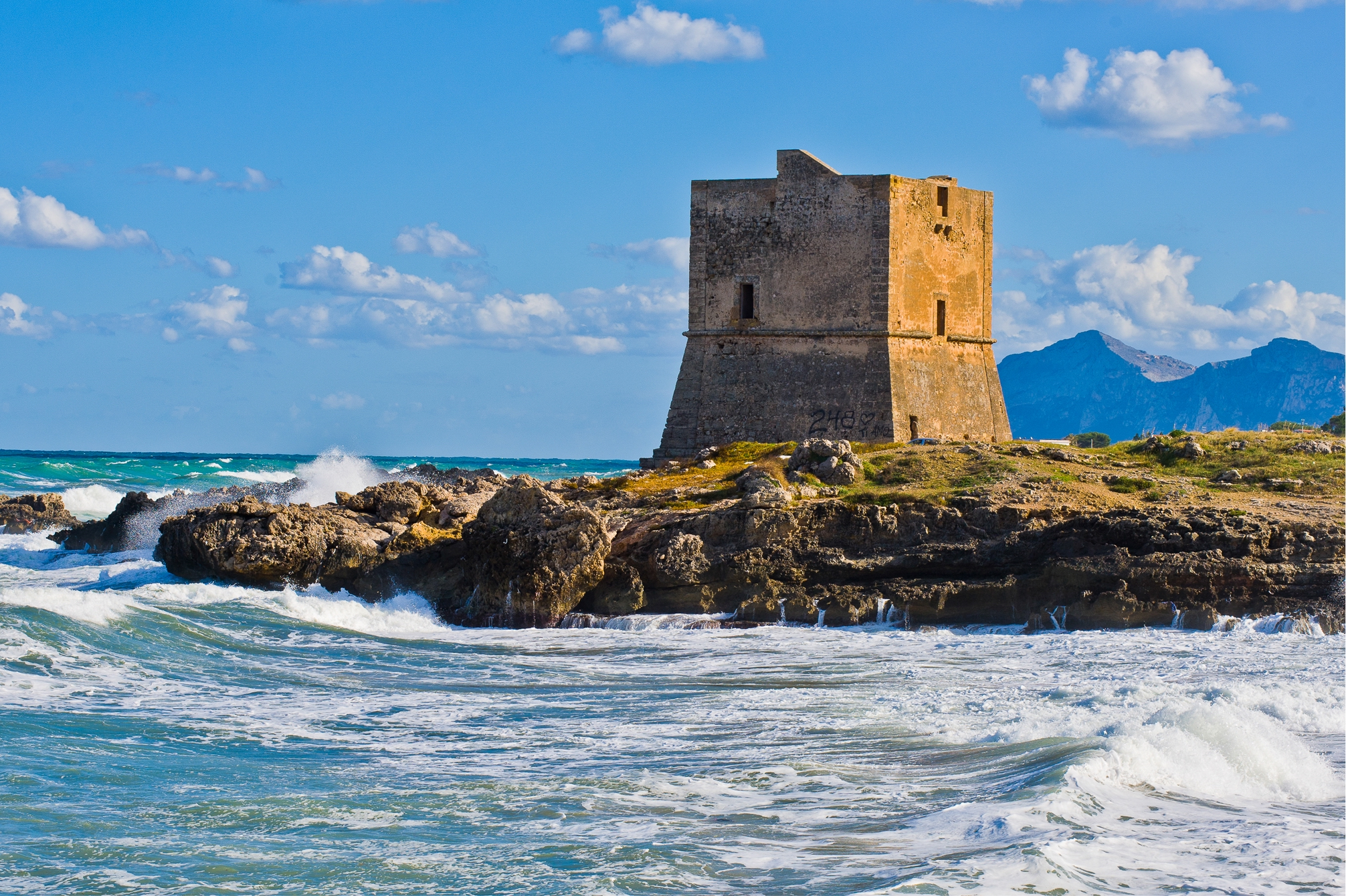
Torre Pozzillo (Cinisi)

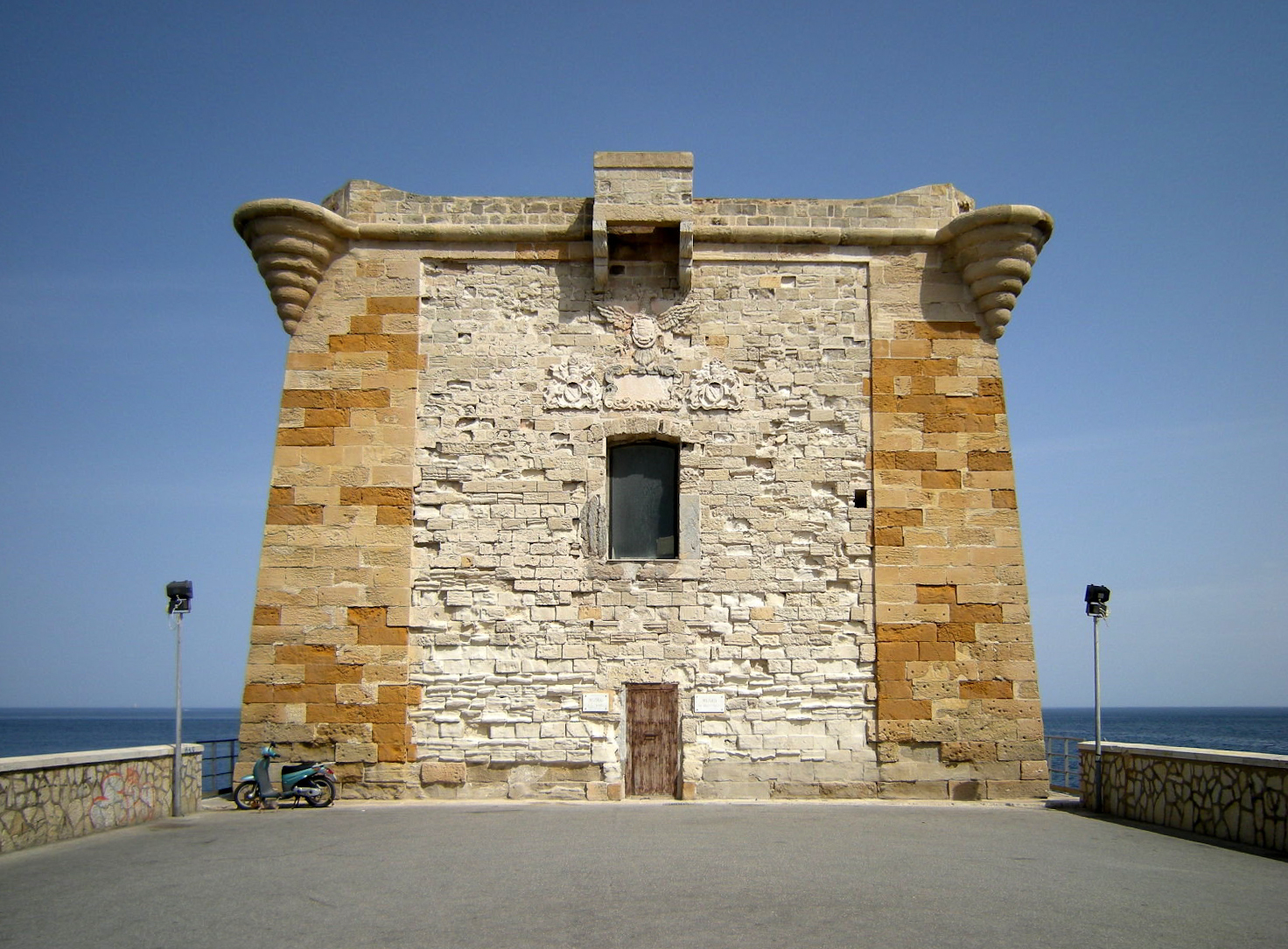
Ligny Tower (Trapani)

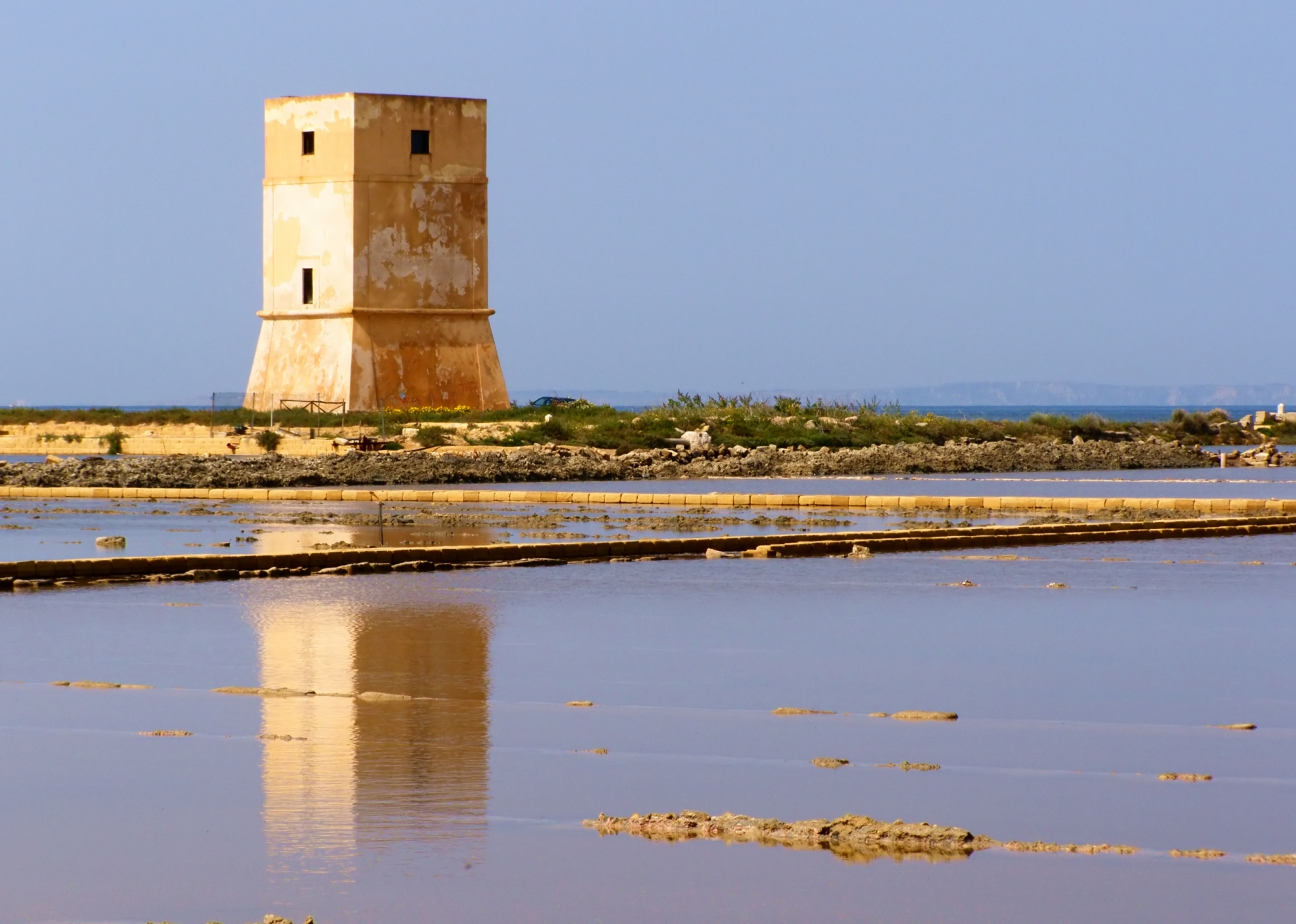
Torre Nubia (Paceco)

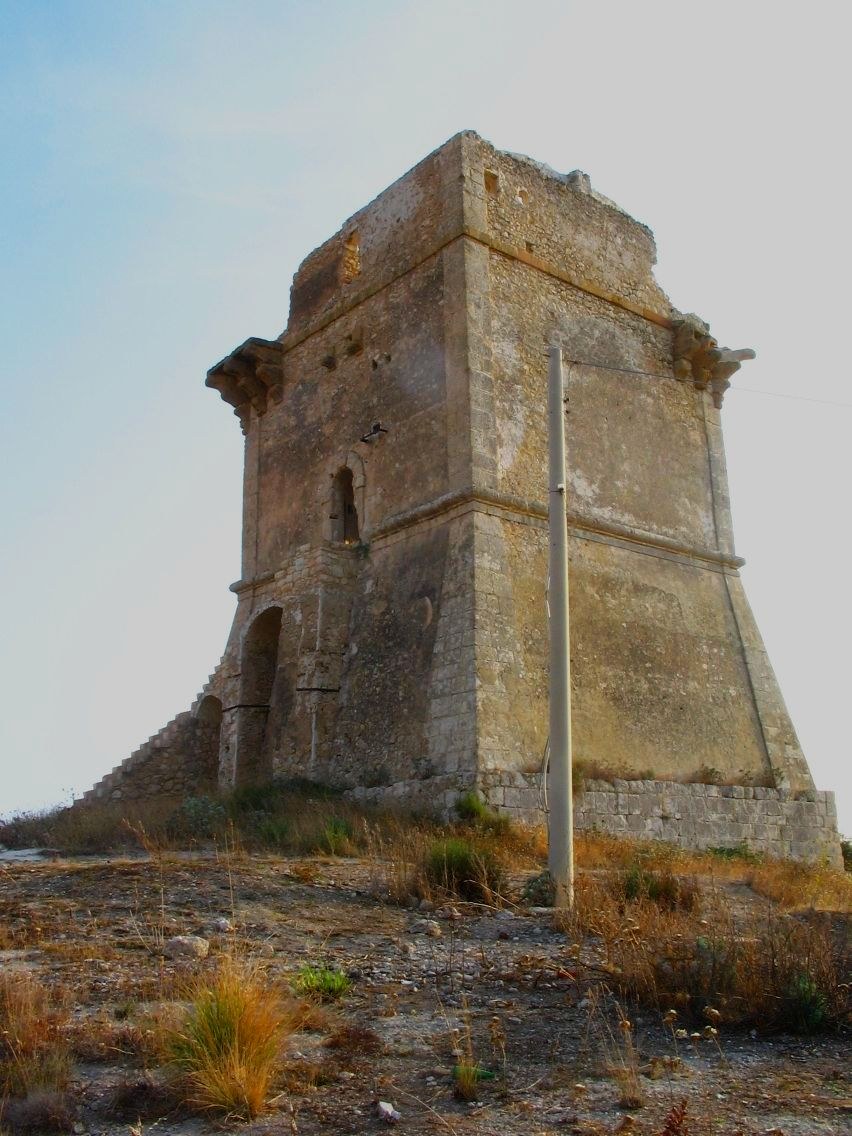
Torre Manfria (Gela)

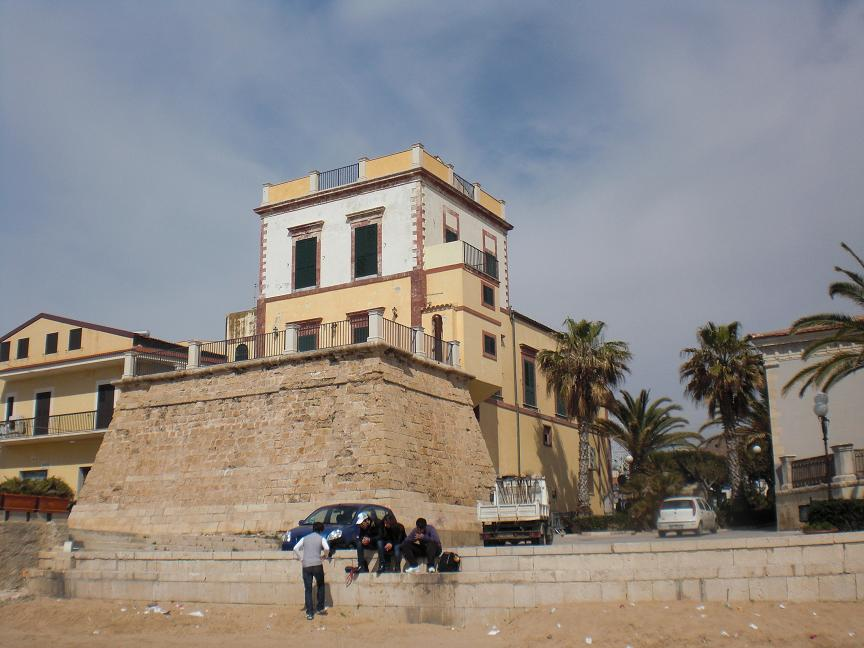
Torre Cabrera (Marina di Ragusa)

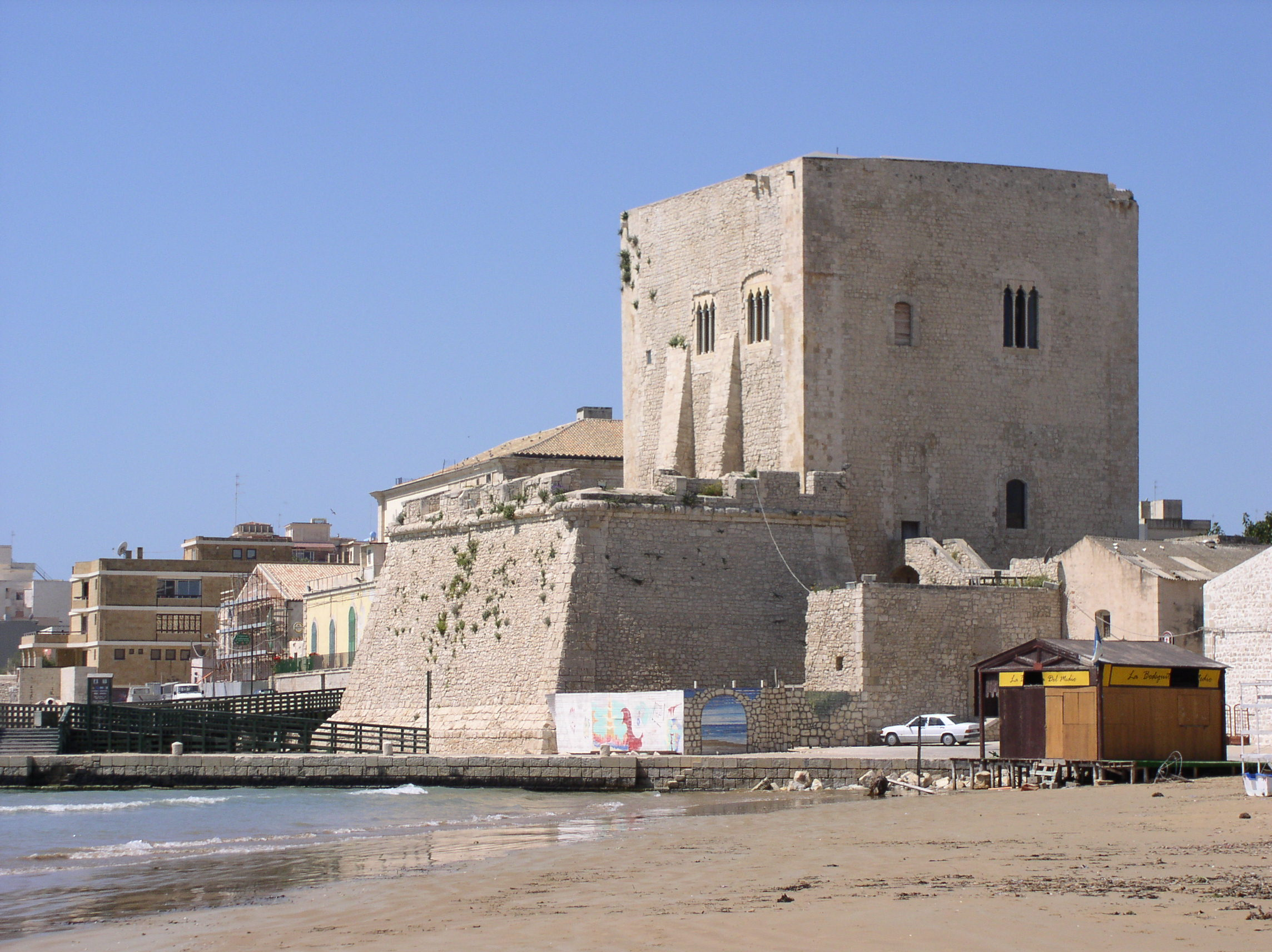
Torre Cabrera (Pozzallo) (Pozzallo)

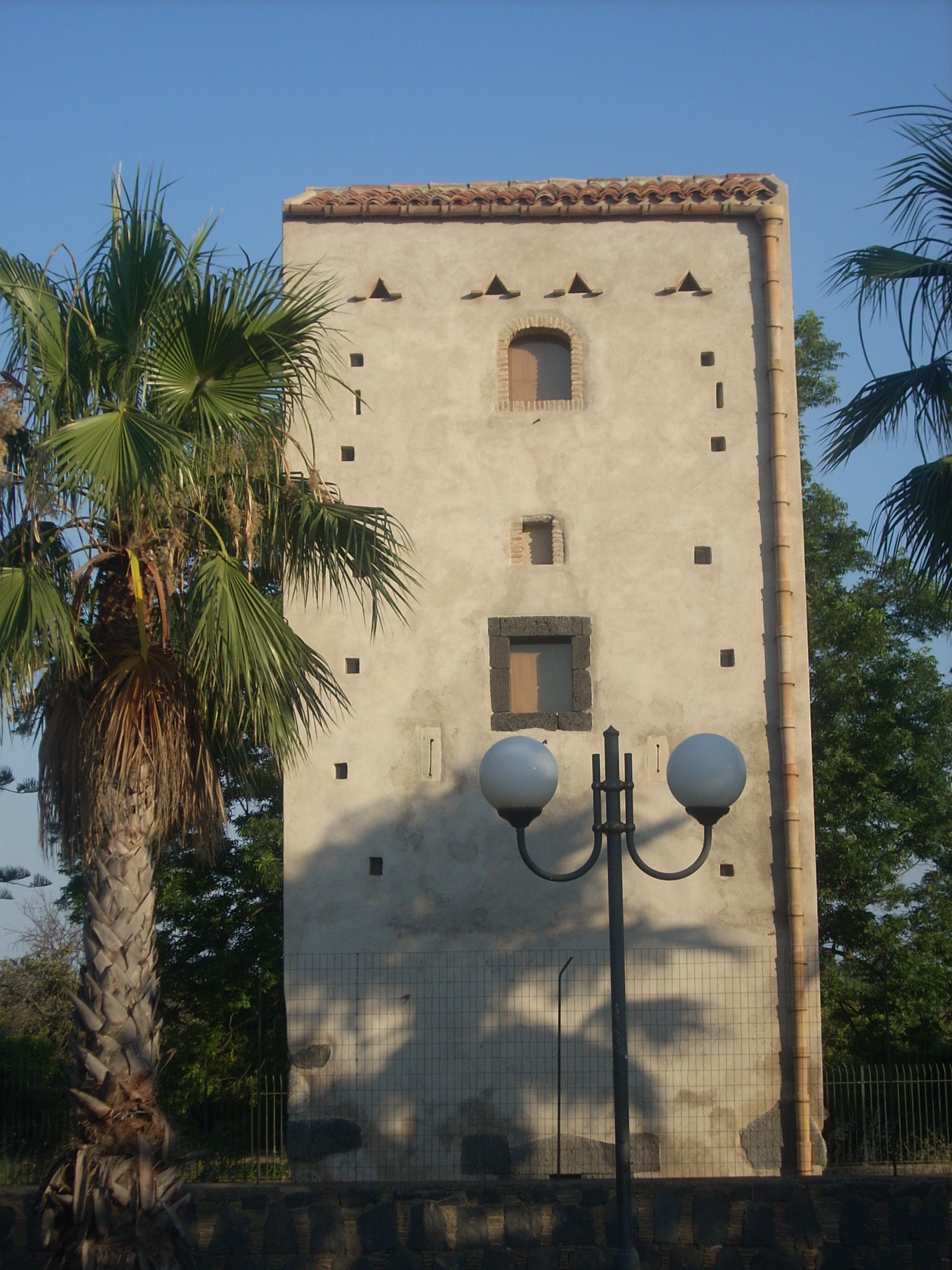
Vignazza Tower (Giardini Naxos)

=== Historical and artistical villages ===
Sicily has many small and picturesque villages, 24 of them have been selected by I Borghi più belli d'Italia (English: The most beautiful Villages of Italy), a non-profit private association of small Italian towns of strong historical and artistic interest, that was founded on the initiative of the Tourism Council of the National Association of Italian Municipalities. These villages are:

- Agira
- Buccheri
- Calascibetta
- Castelmola
- Castiglione di Sicilia
- Castroreale
- Cefalù
- Erice
- Ferla
- Gangi
- Geraci Siculo
- Militello in Val di Catania
- Montalbano Elicona
- Monterosso Almo
- Novara di Sicilia
- Palazzolo Acreide
- Petralia Soprana
- Salemi
- Sambuca di Sicilia
- San Marco d'Alunzio
- Savoca
- Sperlinga
- Sutera
- Troina
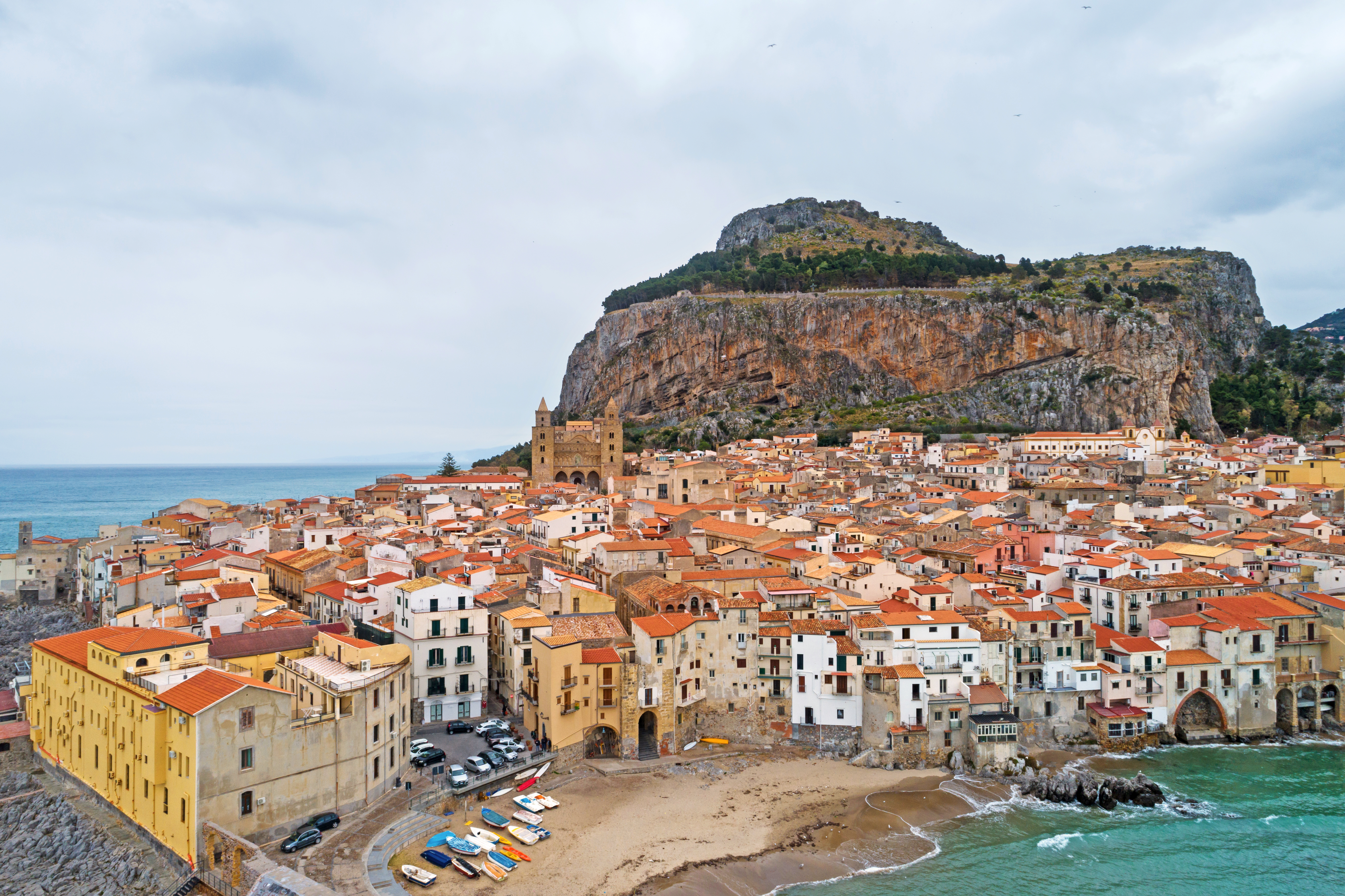
Cefalù

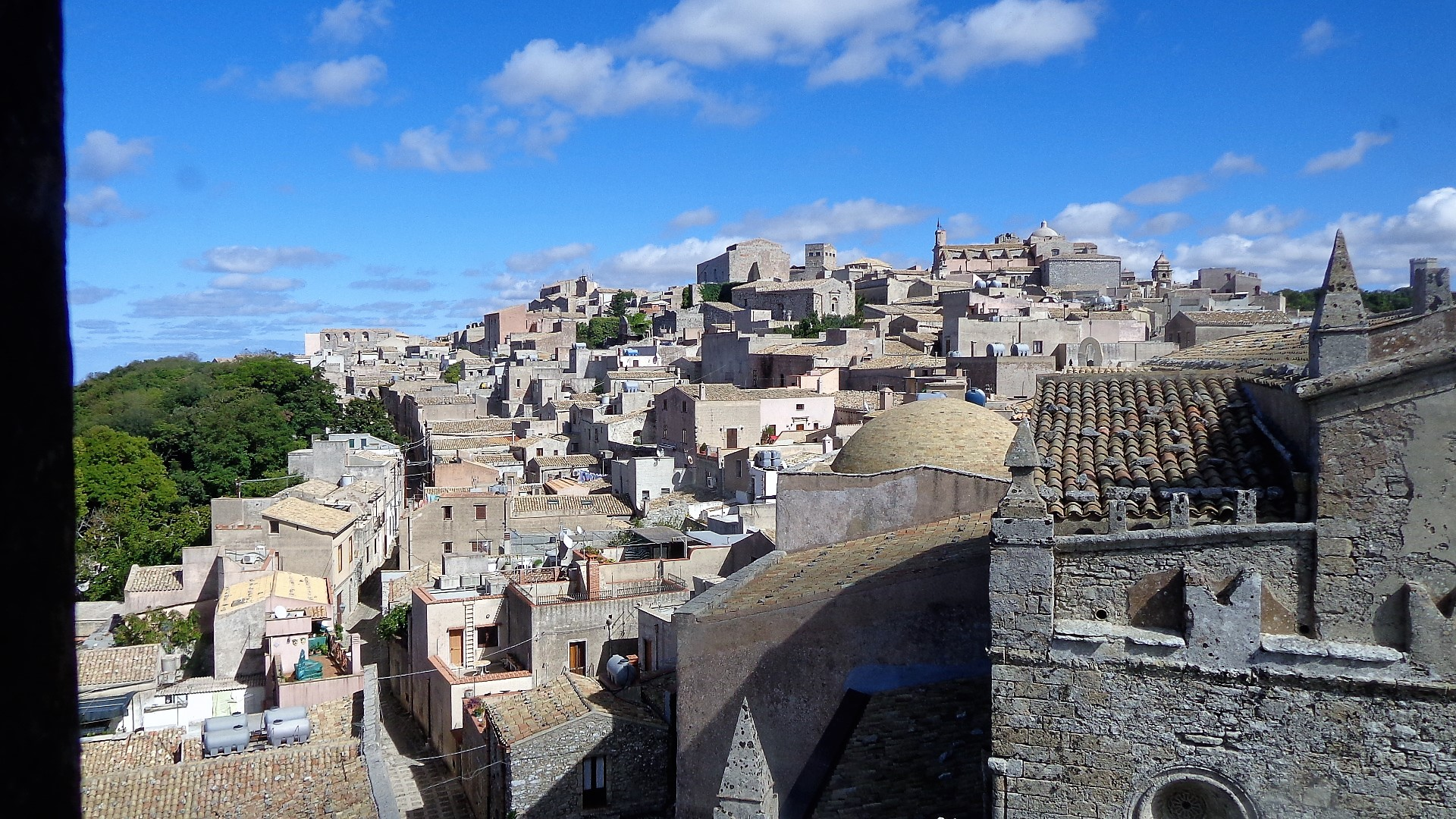
Erice

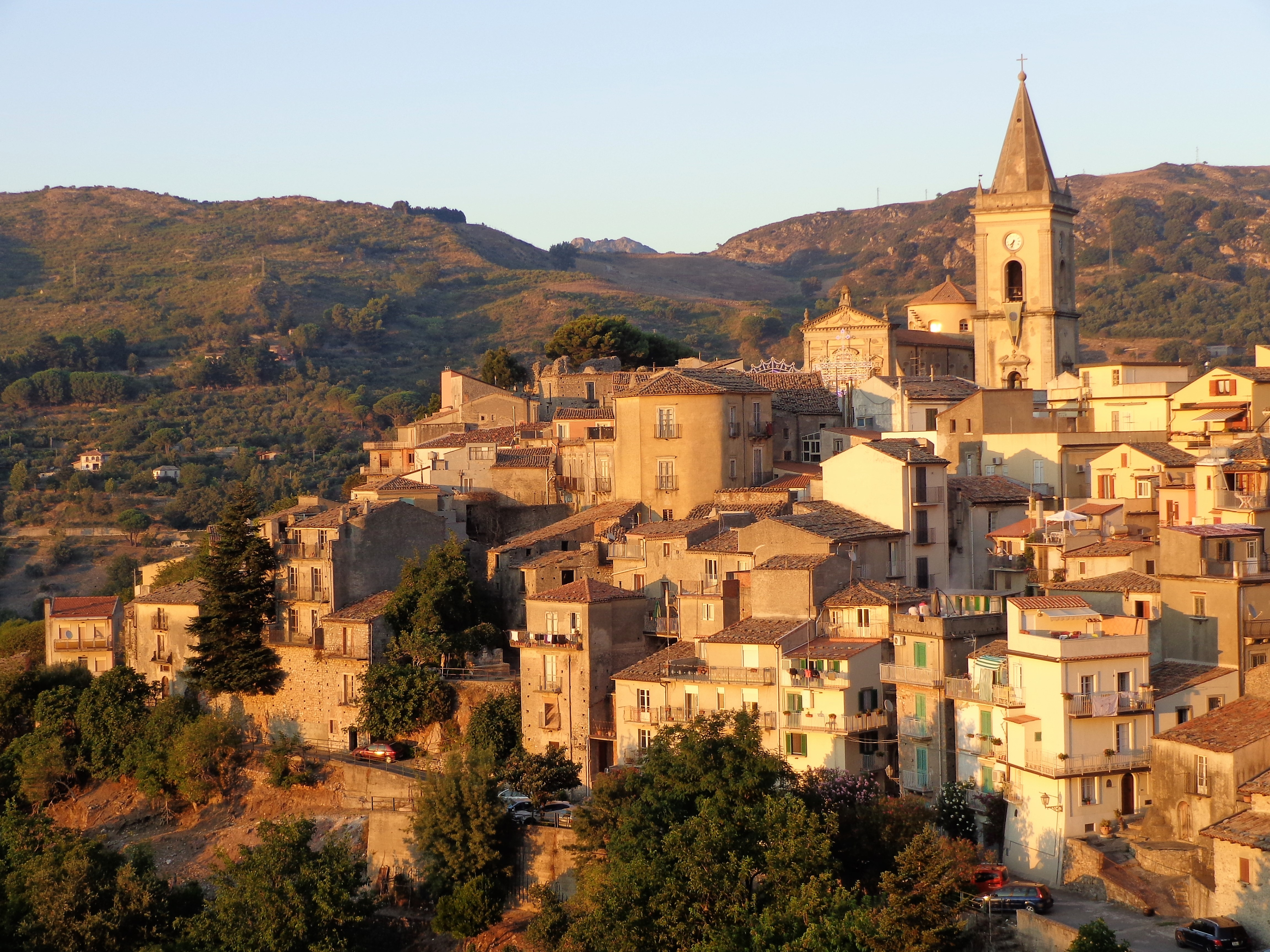
Novara di Sicilia

== Culture ==
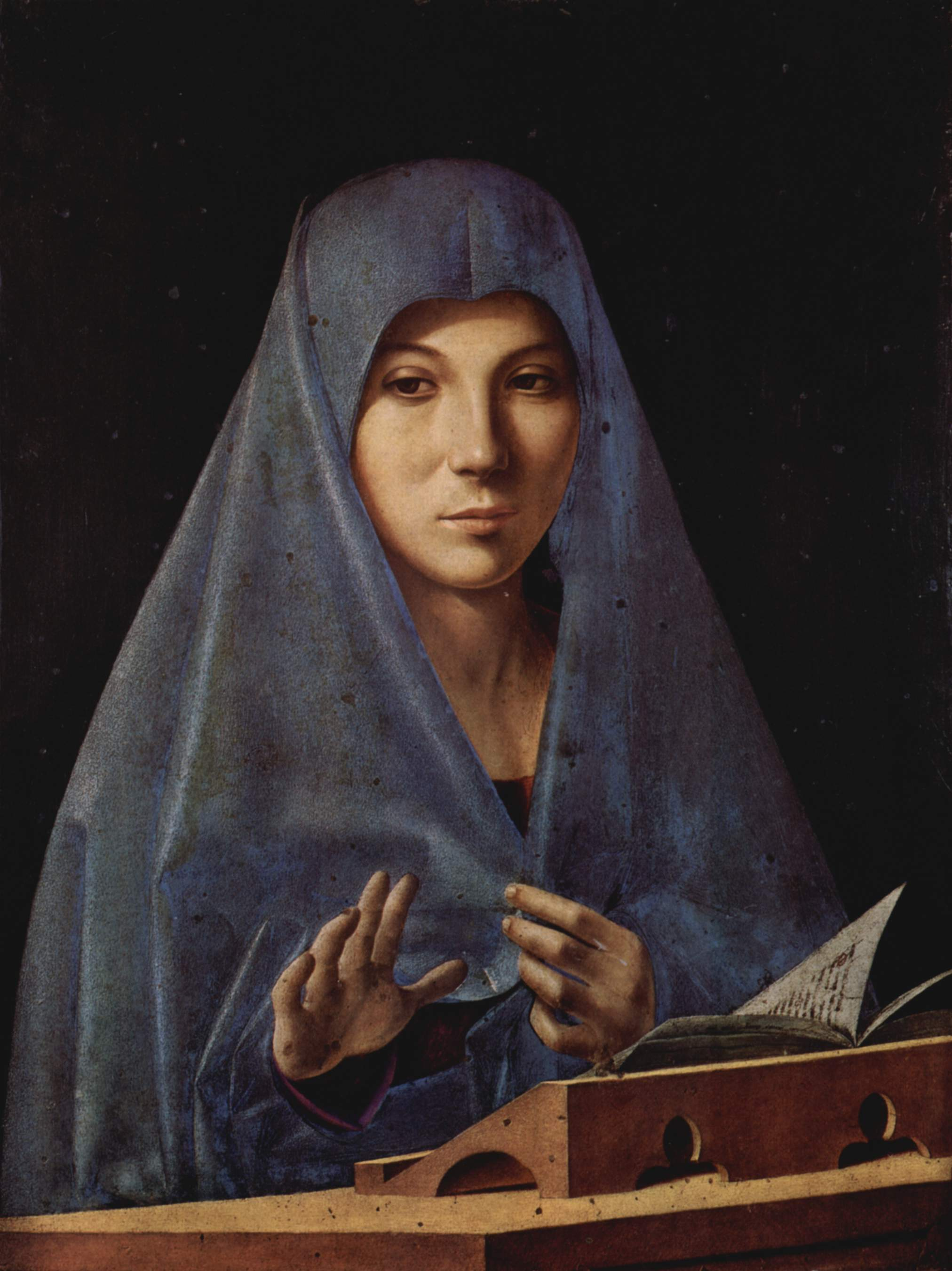
Virgin Annunciate, Antonello da Messina

To have seen Italy without having seen Sicily is to not have seen Italy at all, for Sicily is the clue to everything.

— Goethe

Sicily has long been associated with the arts; many poets, writers, philosophers, intellectuals, architects and painters have roots on the island. Among the earliest illuminaries there are Gorgias and Empedocles, two highly noted Sicilian-Greek philosophers, while the Syracusan-Greek Epicharmus is held to be the inventor of comedy. One of the most famous intellectuals in Greek antiquity was Archimedes, a Syracuse native who is recognized as one of the greatest mathematicians of all time.

=== Art ===
Among the Sicilian artists who succeeded in bringing to the international stage a language of strong civic engagement while at the same time narrating the history of the island, Mario Bardi, a representative of Existential realism, stands out. His painting, characterized by dramatic tones and a constant attention to labour and social tensions, offers a collective and powerful portrayal of Sicily.

=== Architecture ===
Baglio are traditional living structures in Western Sicily.

==== Ceramics ====
Terracotta ceramics from the island are well known, the art of ceramics on Sicily goes back to the original ancient peoples named the Sicanians, it was then perfected during the period of Greek colonisation and is still prominent and distinct to this day. Nowadays, Caltagirone is one of the most important centres in Sicily for the artistic production of ceramics and terra-cotta sculptures. Famous painters include Renaissance artist Antonello da Messina, Pietro Novelli, Bruno Caruso, Renato Guttuso and Greek born Giorgio de Chirico who is commonly dubbed the "father of Surrealist art" and founder of the metaphysical art movement. The most noted architects are Filippo Juvarra (one of the most important figures of the Italian Baroque) and Ernesto Basile.

==== Sicilian Baroque ====
The Sicilian Baroque has a unique architectural identity. Noto, Caltagirone, Catania, Ragusa, Modica, Scicli and particularly Acireale contain some of Italy's best examples of Baroque architecture, carved in the local red sandstone. Noto provides one of the best examples of the Baroque architecture brought to Sicily. The Baroque style in Sicily was largely confined to buildings erected by the church, and palazzi built as private residences for the Sicilian aristocracy. The earliest examples of this style in Sicily lacked individuality and were typically heavy-handed pastiches of buildings seen by Sicilian visitors to Rome, Florence, and Naples. However, even at this early stage, provincial architects had begun to incorporate certain vernacular features of Sicily's older architecture. By the middle of the 18th century, when Sicily's Baroque architecture was noticeably different from that of the mainland, it has a unique freedom of design that is difficult to characterize in words.

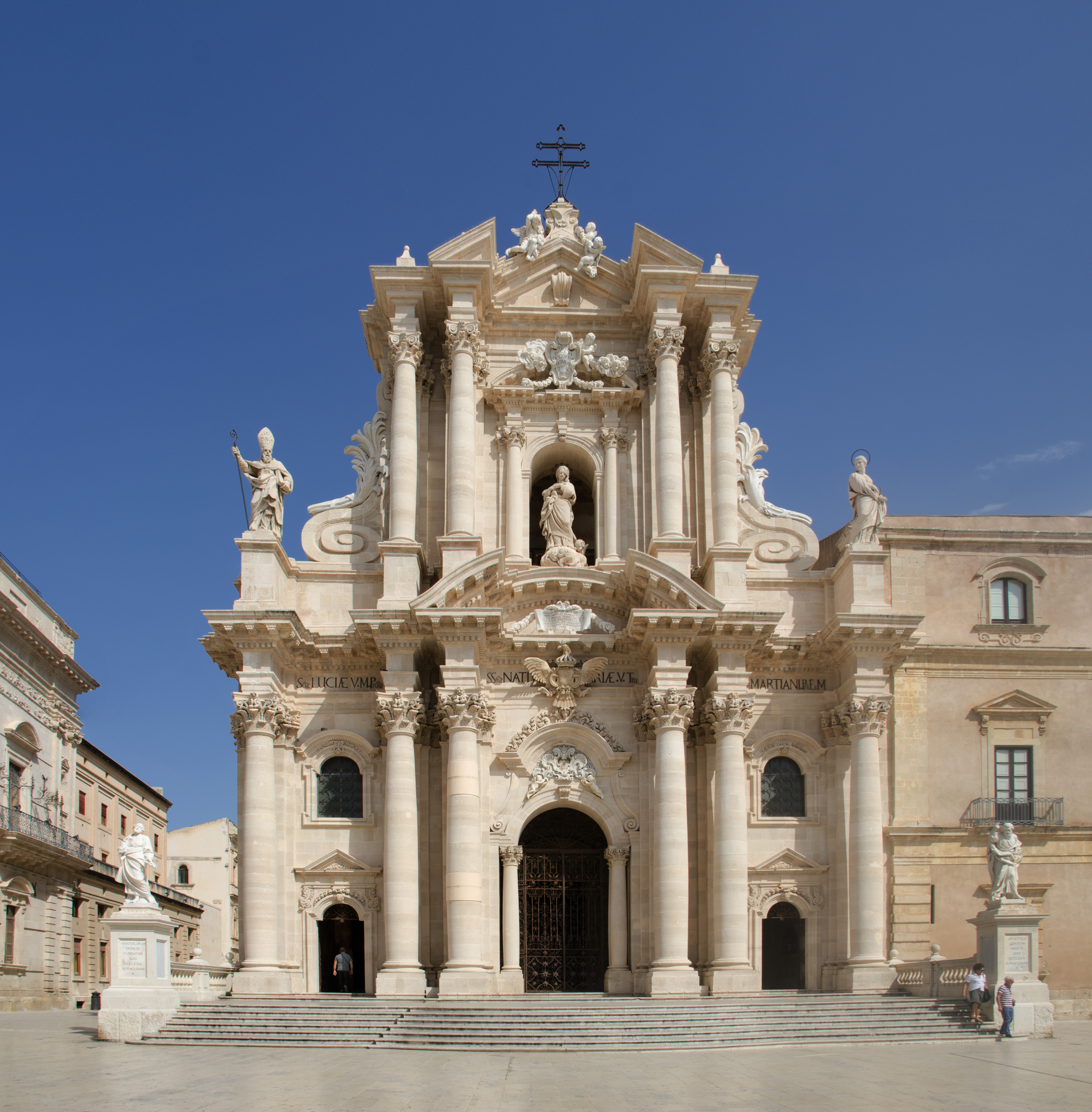
Syracuse, Cathedral

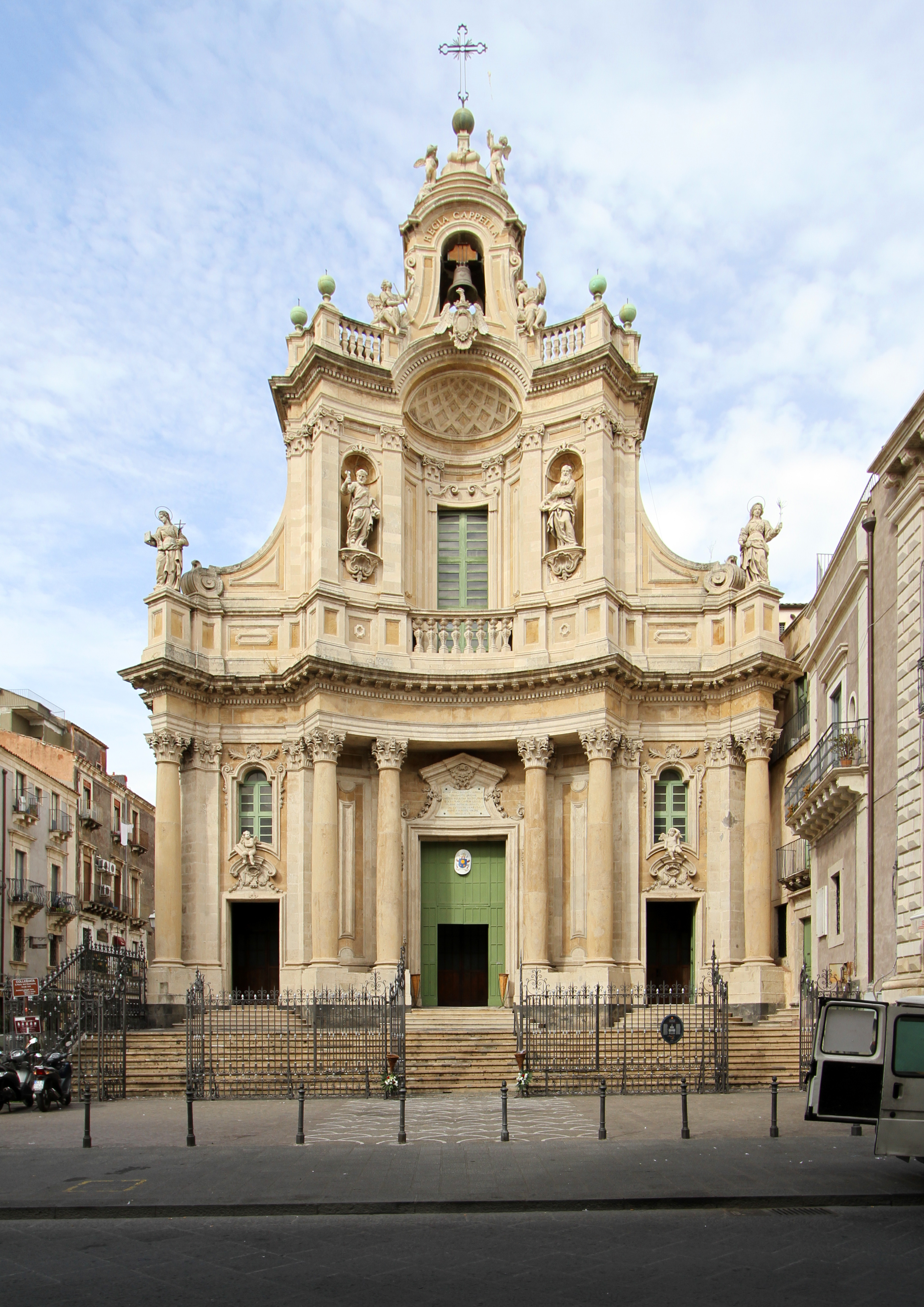
Catania, Basilica Collegiata

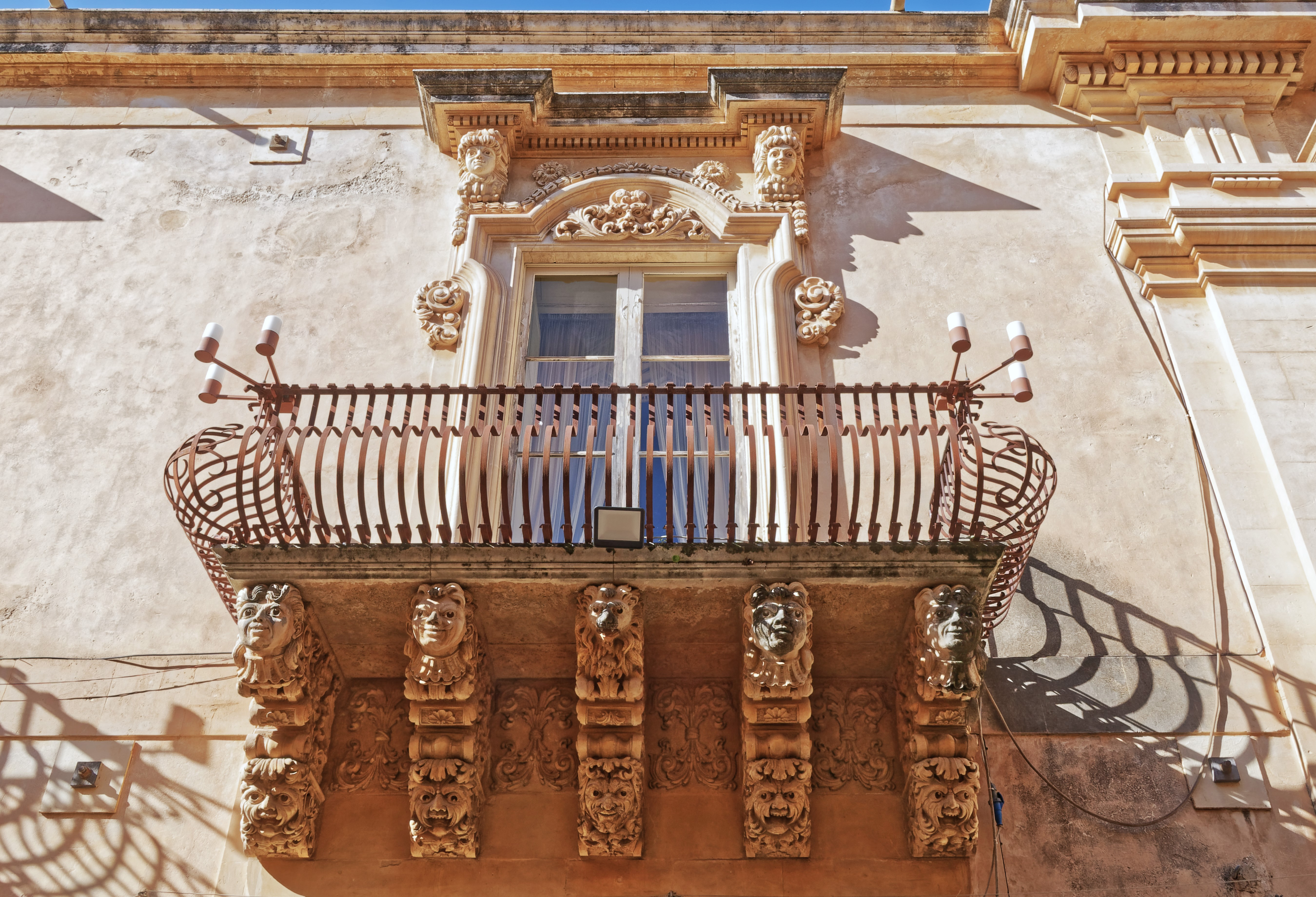
Noto, Palazzo Nicolaci

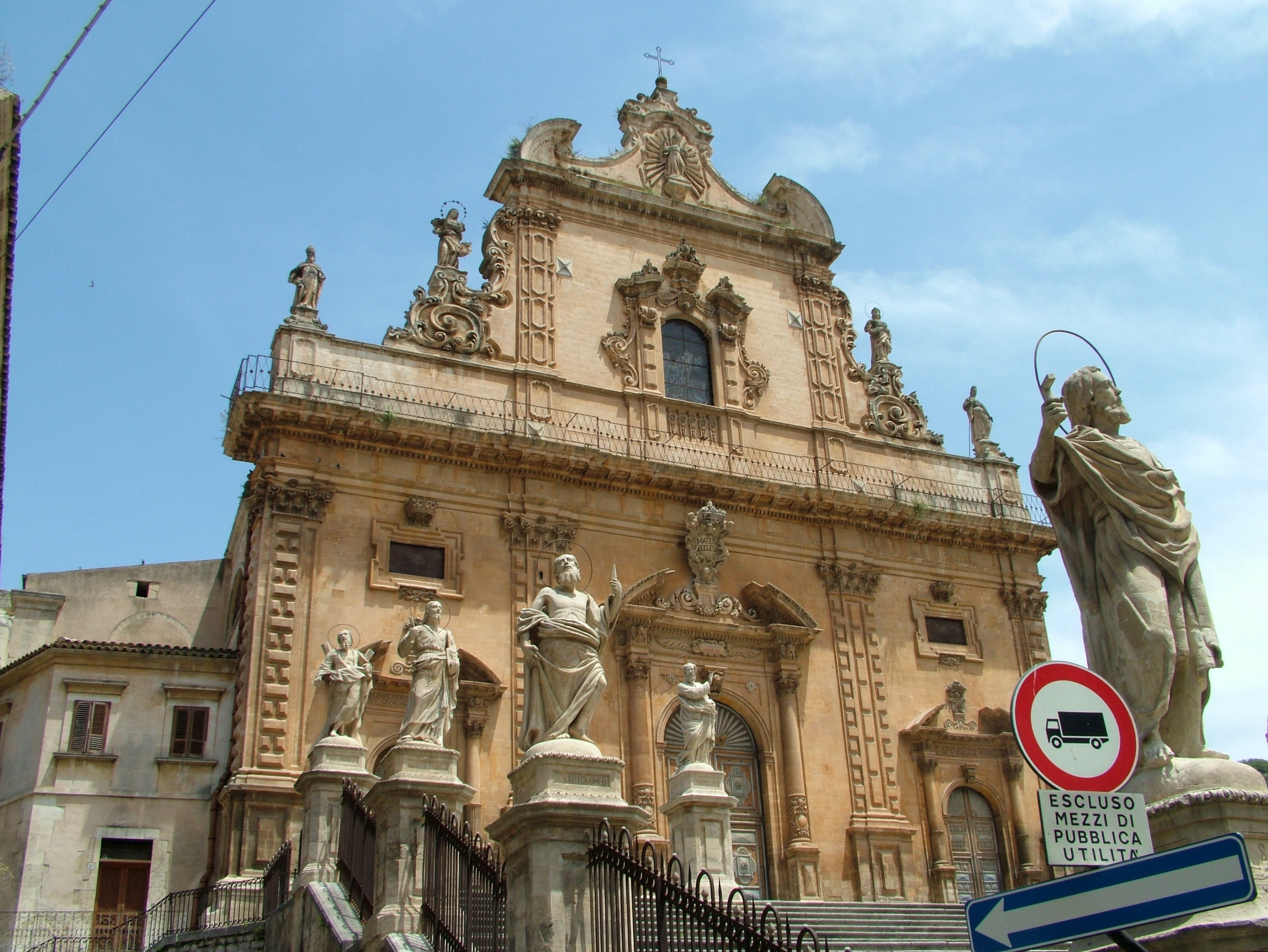
Modica, church of San Pietro

=== Music and film ===
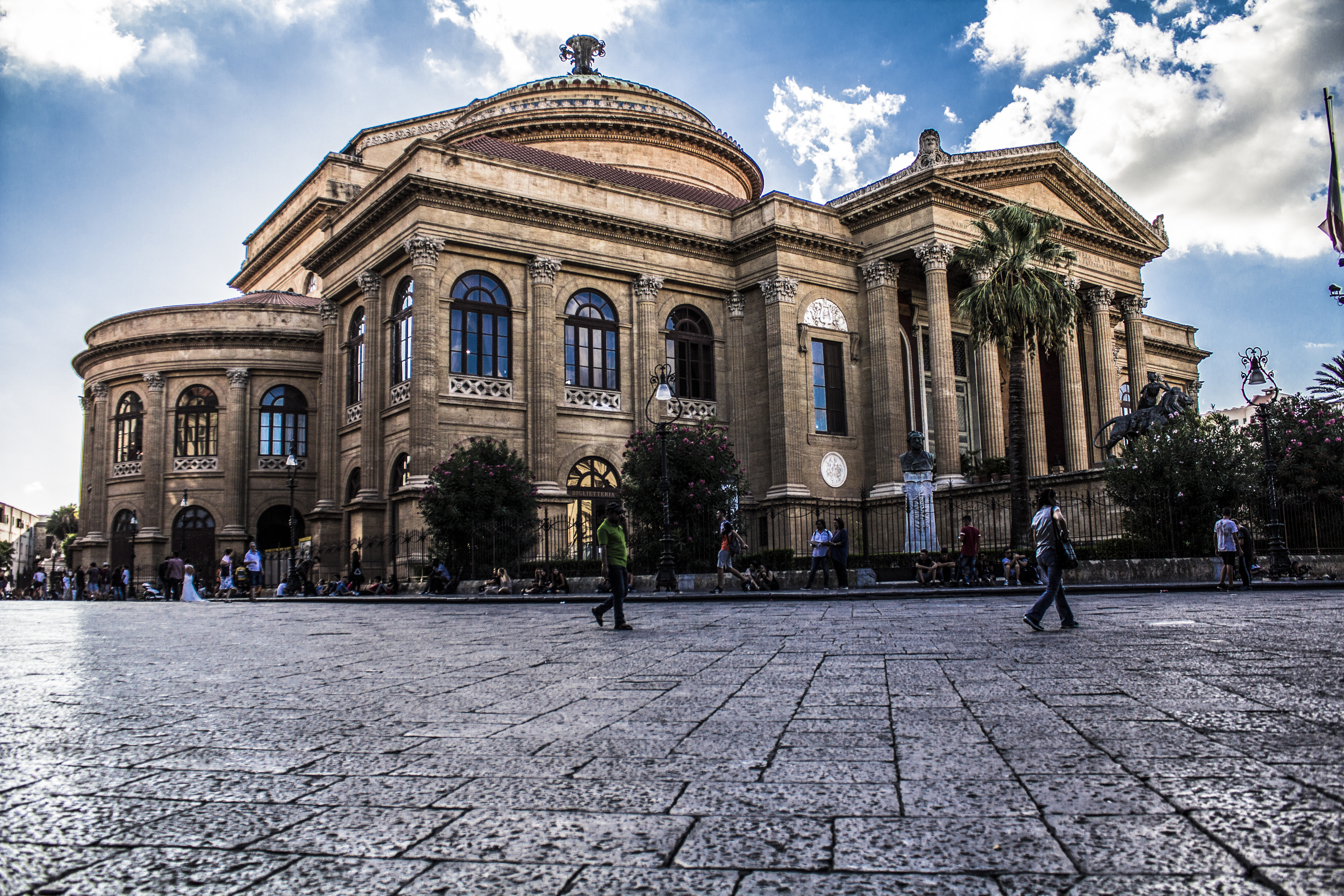
Teatro Massimo, Palermo

Palermo hosts the Teatro Massimo, which is the largest opera house in Italy and the third largest in all of Europe. In Catania there is another important opera house, the Teatro Massimo Bellini with 1,200 seats, which is considered one of the best European opera houses for its acoustics. Sicily's composers vary from Vincenzo Bellini, Sigismondo d'India, Giovanni Pacini and Alessandro Scarlatti, to contemporary composers such as Salvatore Sciarrino and Silvio Amato.

Many films of Italian cinema have been filmed in Sicily, amongst the most noted of which are: Visconti's La Terra Trema and The Leopard, Pietro Germi's Divorce Italian Style and Seduced and Abandoned, and Tornatore's Cinema Paradiso.

The annual Taormina Film Fest takes places in Taormina.

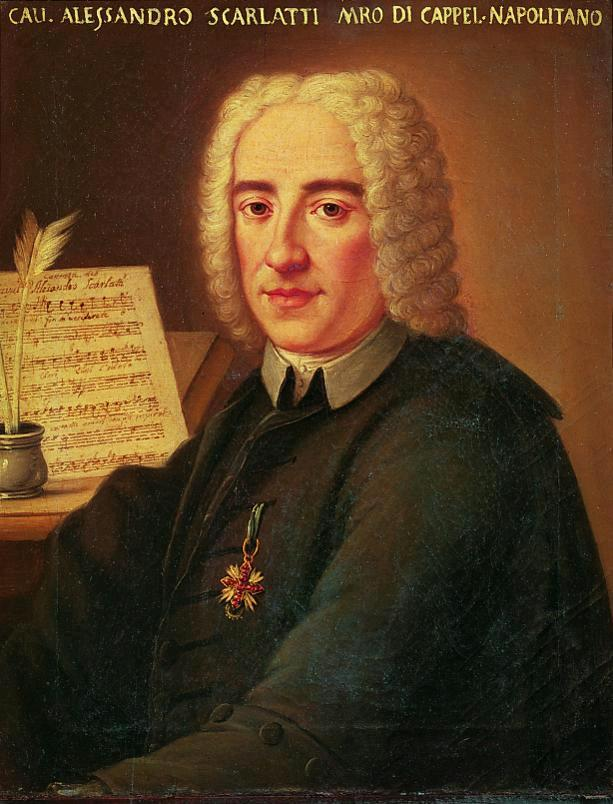
Alessandro Scarlatti

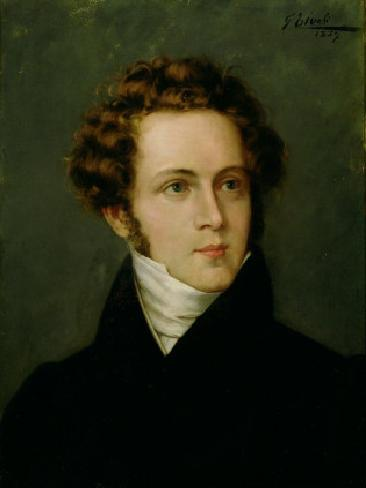
Vincenzo Bellini

=== Literature ===
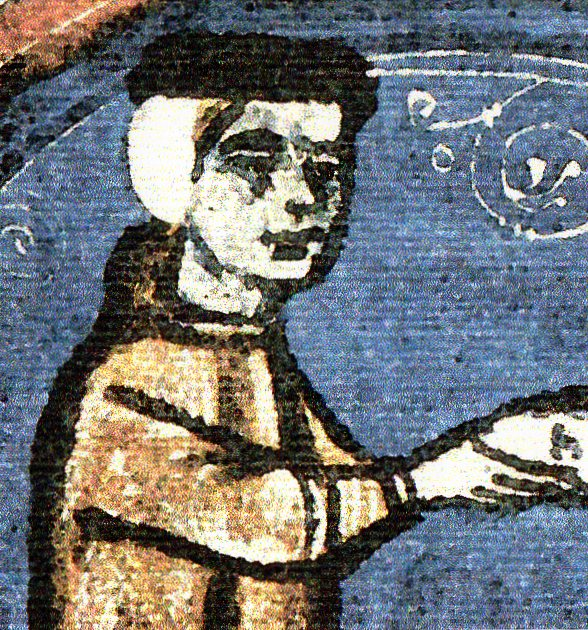
Giacomo da Lentini (detail of a 14th century miniature, National Central Library of Florence), a senior poet of the Sicilian School. Giacomo da Lentini is credited with the invention of the sonnet.

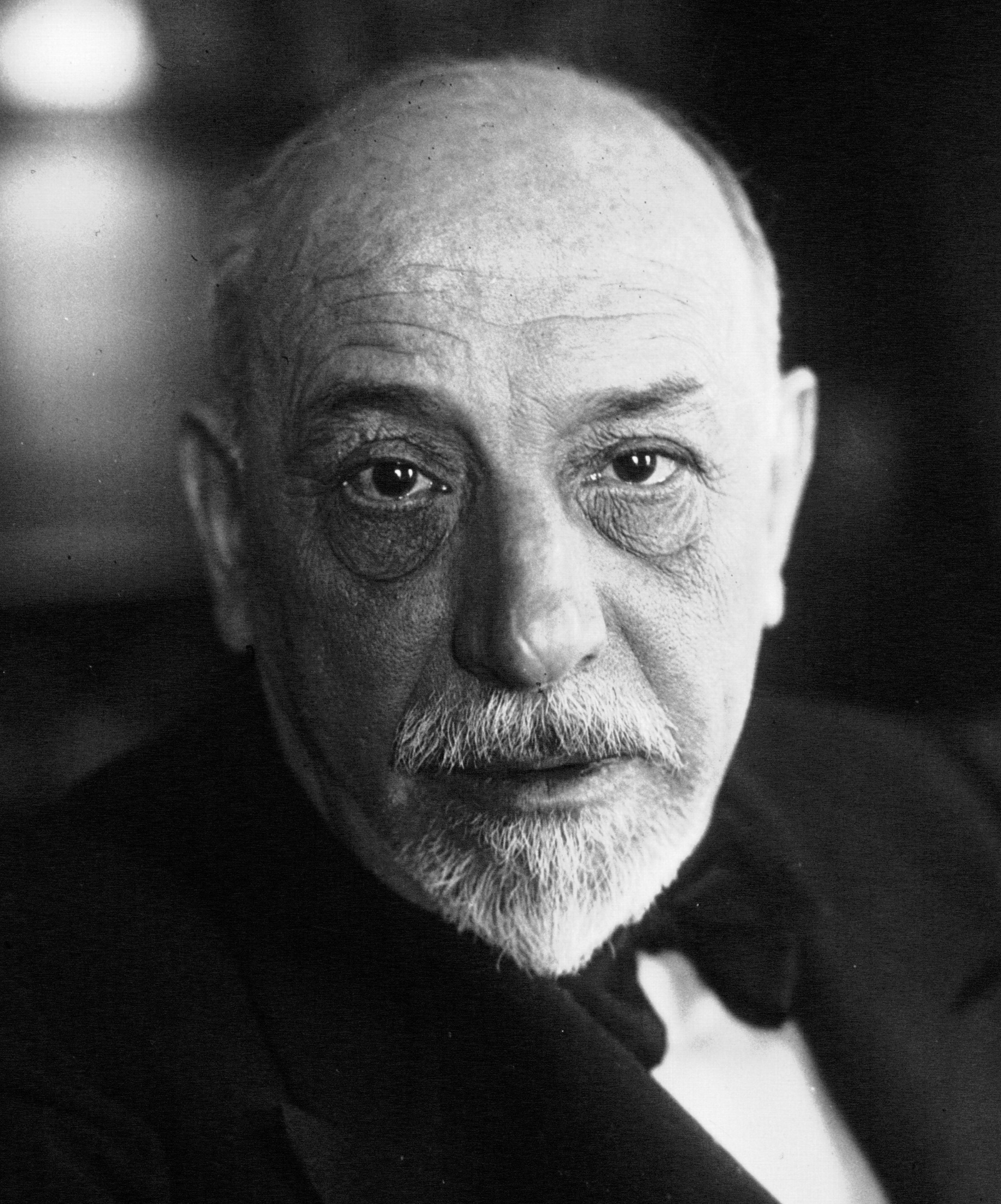
Luigi Pirandello (Nobel laureate, 1934)

The Sicilian School was a small community of Sicilian and mainland Italian poets gathered around Frederick II, most of them belonging to his imperial court in Palermo, which was highly influential on Italian literature. Headed by Giacomo da Lentini, they produced more than 300 poems of courtly love between 1230 and 1266, the experiment being continued after Frederick's death by his son, Manfred. Giacomo da Lentini is credited with the invention of the sonnet.

These poets drew inspiration from the troubadour poetry of Occitania written in langue d'oc, which applied the feudal code of honor to the relation between a man (acting as the vassal) and a woman (acting as king or superior). This is a reversal of the traditional role of women, traditionally dependent on men, and marks a new awareness in medieval society: the decadence of feudalism with the increasing power of the middle class, causes a shift in the reading public, the epic (traditionally devoted to great military pursuits) gradually giving way to the lyric (generally focused on love). In the lower Middle Ages more and more women were reading books than ever before and poetry tried to adapt to their point of view and their newly acquired role in society.

This features Occitan poetry, then very influential in Italy. What distinguishes the Sicilian School from the troubadours, however, is the introduction of a kinder, gentler type of woman than that found in their Occitan models; one who was nearer to Dante's madonnas and Petrarch's Laura, though much less characterised psychologically. The poems of the Sicilians hardly portray real women or situations (Frederick's song cannot be read as autobiographical), but the style and language are remarkable, since the Sicilians (as Dante called them) created the first literary standard in Italy by enriching the existing vernacular base, probably inspired by popular love songs, with new words of Latin and Provençal origin.

Some of the most noted figures among modern writers and poets are Luigi Pirandello (Nobel laureate, 1934), Salvatore Quasimodo (Nobel laureate, 1959), Giovanni Verga (the father of the Italian Verismo), Domenico Tempio, Giovanni Meli, Luigi Capuana, Mario Rapisardi, Federico de Roberto, Leonardo Sciascia, Vitaliano Brancati, Giuseppe Tomasi di Lampedusa, Elio Vittorini, Vincenzo Consolo and Andrea Camilleri (noted for his novels and short stories with the fictional character Inspector Salvo Montalbano as protagonist). On the political side notable philosophers include Gaetano Mosca and Giovanni Gentile who wrote The Doctrine of Fascism.

=== Languages ===
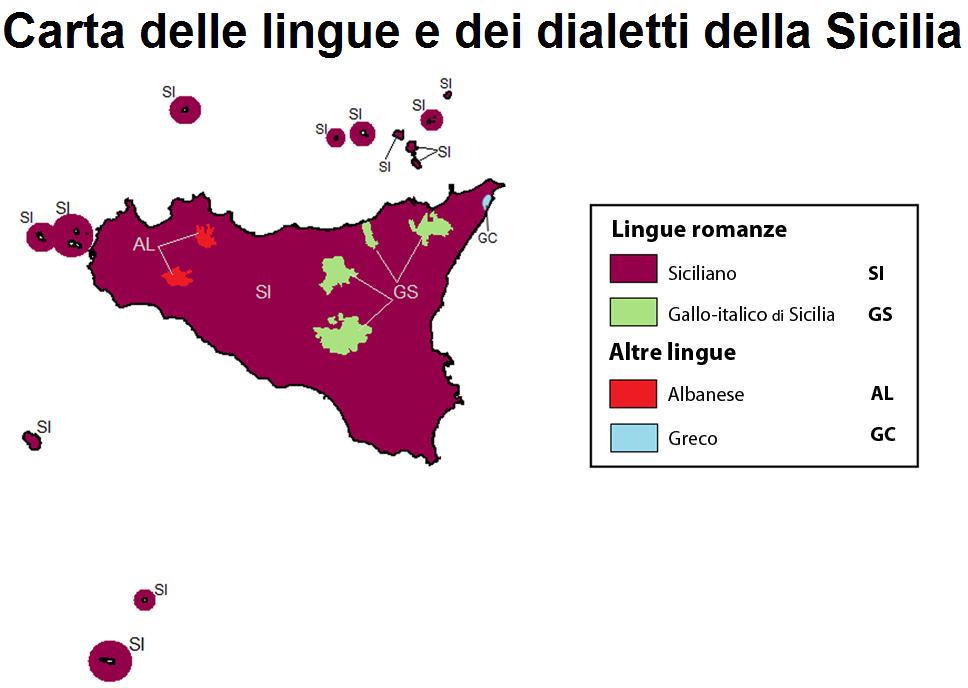
The languages spoken in Sicily (excluding Italian)

Sicily is mostly bilingual, with most people speaking both Italian and Sicilian. Sicilian is a Romance language, closely related to Italian but distinct from it, with vocabulary influenced by Greek, Catalan, Norman, French, Arabic, Spanish and other languages. Today, however, the use of Sicilian is limited to informal and family contexts, and is often replaced by a regional variety of Italian (known as regional Italian of Sicily). Varieties related to Sicilian are also spoken in Calabria and Salento. Sicilian had a significant influence on the Maltese language.

Beyond Sicilian and Italian, other languages are spoken across the island. Within the province of Palermo, four towns are home to speakers of Arbëresh, which is the name given to varieties of Albanian spoken in Italy. The Arbëreshë people originally migrated from the Balkans to escape the invasion of the Ottoman Empire in the 15th and 16th centuries and settled in isolated areas of southern Italy.

In the eastern part of the island, Gallo-Italic varieties, collectively known as Gallo-Italic of Sicily, are spoken. These are related to the other Gallo-Italic languages spoken in most of northern Italy and in other isolated pockets of southern Italy. Gallo-Italic speakers originally migrated to Sicily from southern Piedmont and Liguria to meet the Norman monarchy's need to repopulate strategic centres and control Arab presence in the 11th–13th centuries. (Note: Although the Normans did not control Liguria or Piedmont, the reigning Hauteville family had marital connections with rulers in the two regions, which facilitated the migration.)

=== Science ===
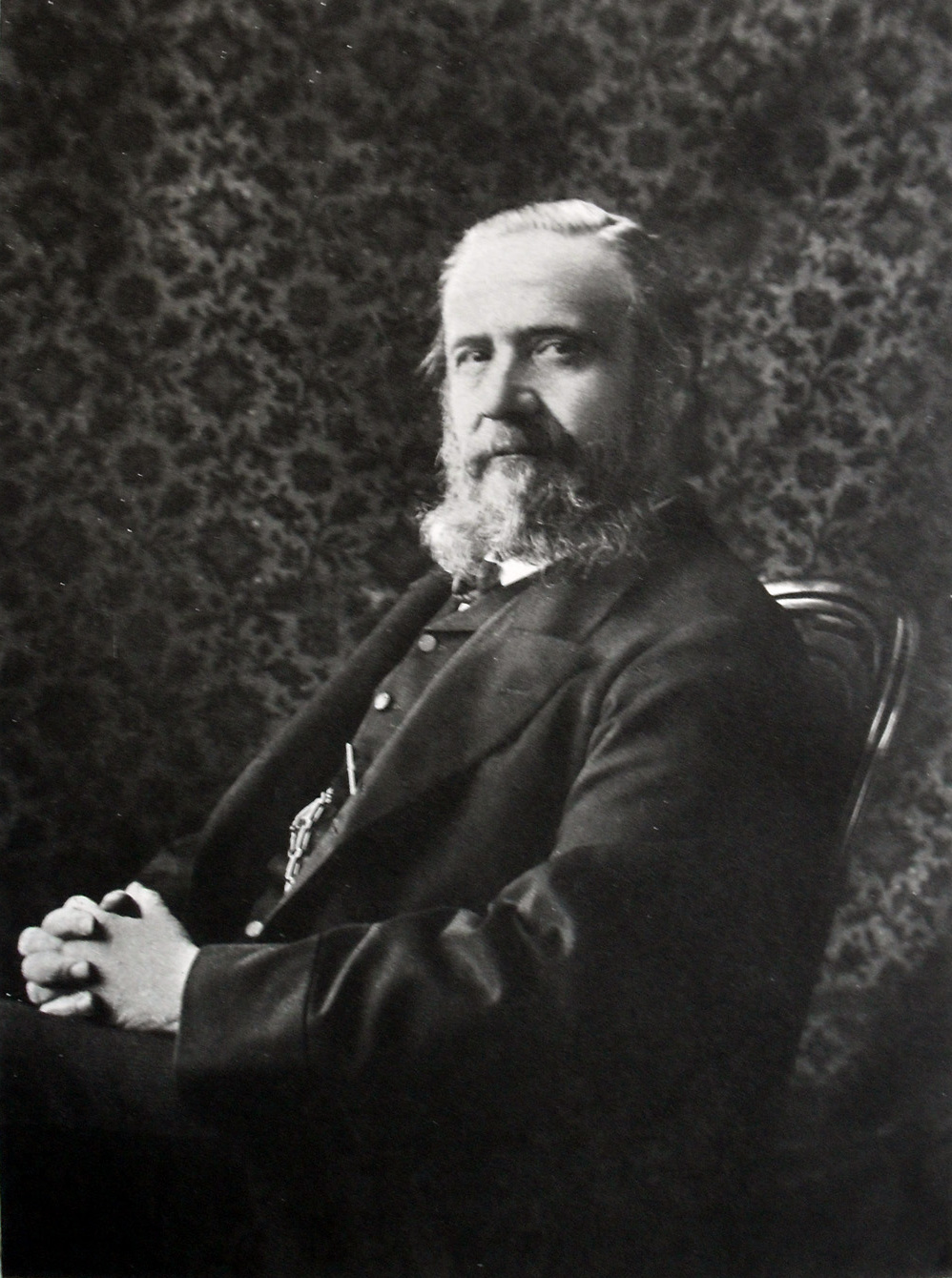
Stanislao Cannizzaro, known for the Cannizzaro reaction and for his influential role in the atomic-weight deliberations of the Karlsruhe Congress

Catania has one of the four laboratories of the Istituto Nazionale di Fisica Nucleare (National Institute for Nuclear Physics) in which there is a cyclotron that uses protons both for nuclear physics experiments and for particle therapy to treat cancer (proton therapy). Noto has one of the largest radio telescopes in Italy that performs geodetic and astronomical observations. There are observatories in Palermo and Catania, managed by the Istituto Nazionale di Astrofisica (National Institute for Astrophysics). In the Observatory of Palermo the astronomer Giuseppe Piazzi discovered the first and the largest asteroid to be identified Ceres (today considered a dwarf planet) on 1 January 1801; Catania has two observatories, one of which is situated on Mount Etna at 1,800 metres (5,900 feet).

Syracuse is also an experimental centre for solar technologies through the creation of the project Archimede solar power plant that is the first concentrated solar power plant to use molten salt for heat transfer and storage which is integrated with a combined-cycle gas facility. All the plant is owned and operated by Enel. The touristic town of Erice is also an important science place thanks to the Ettore Majorana Foundation and Centre for Scientific Culture which embraces 123 schools from all over the world, covering all branches of science, offering courses, seminars, workshops, and annual meetings. It was founded by the physicist Antonino Zichichi in honour of another scientist of the island, Ettore Majorana known for the Majorana equation and Majorana fermions. Sicily's famous scientists also include Stanislao Cannizzaro (chemist), Giovanni Battista Hodierna and Niccolò Cacciatore (astronomers).

=== Education ===
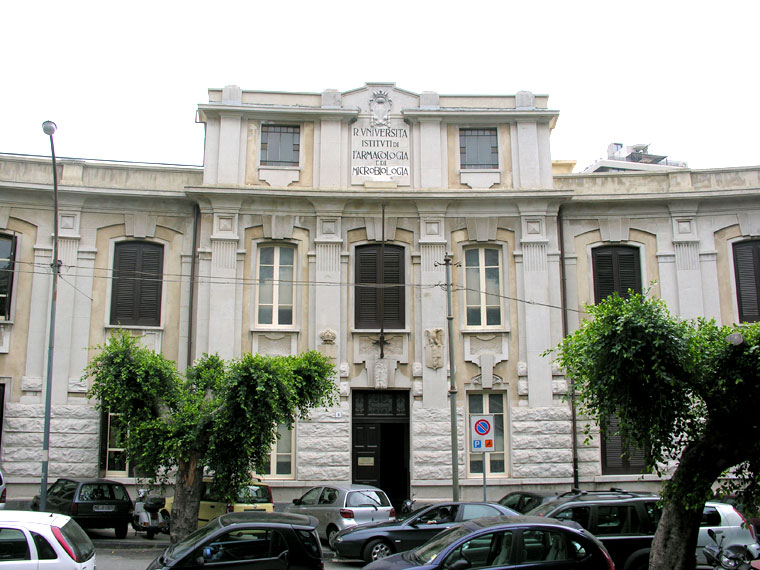
The University of Messina

Sicily has four universities:

- The University of Catania dates back to 1434 and it is the oldest university in Sicily. It currently hosts 12 faculties and over 62,000 students and it offers undergraduate and postgraduate programs. Catania hosts also the Scuola Superiore, an academic institution linked to the University of Catania, aiming for excellence in education.
- The University of Palermo is the island's second-oldest university. It was officially founded in 1806, although historical records indicate that medicine and law have been taught there since the late 15th century. The Orto botanico di Palermo (Palermo botanical gardens) is home to the university's Department of Botany and is also open to visitors.
- The University of Messina, founded in 1548 by Ignatius of Loyola. It is organized in 11 Faculties.
- The Kore University of Enna founded in 1995, is the latest Sicilian university and the first university founded in Sicily after the Italian Unification.

=== Cuisine ===
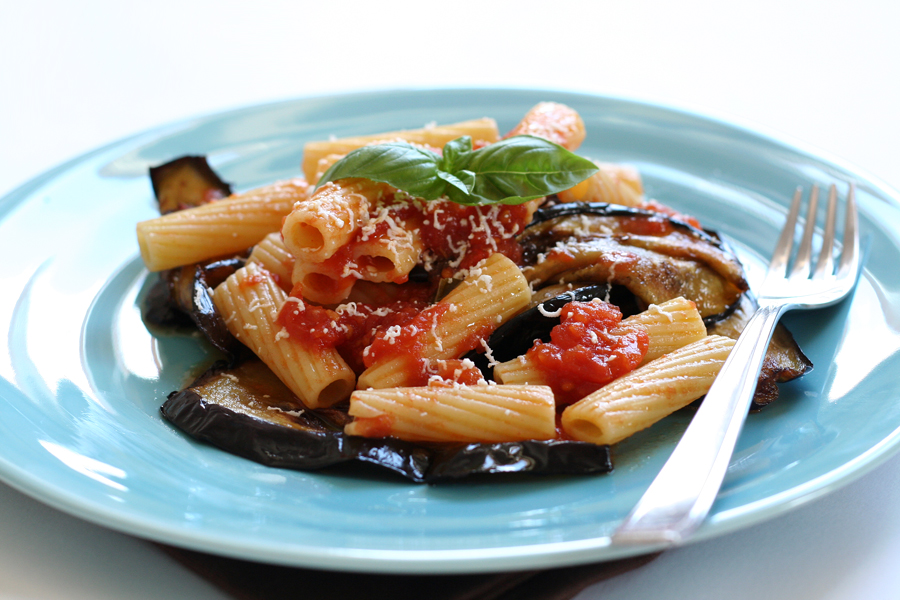
Pasta alla Norma is amongst Sicily's most historic and iconic dishes.

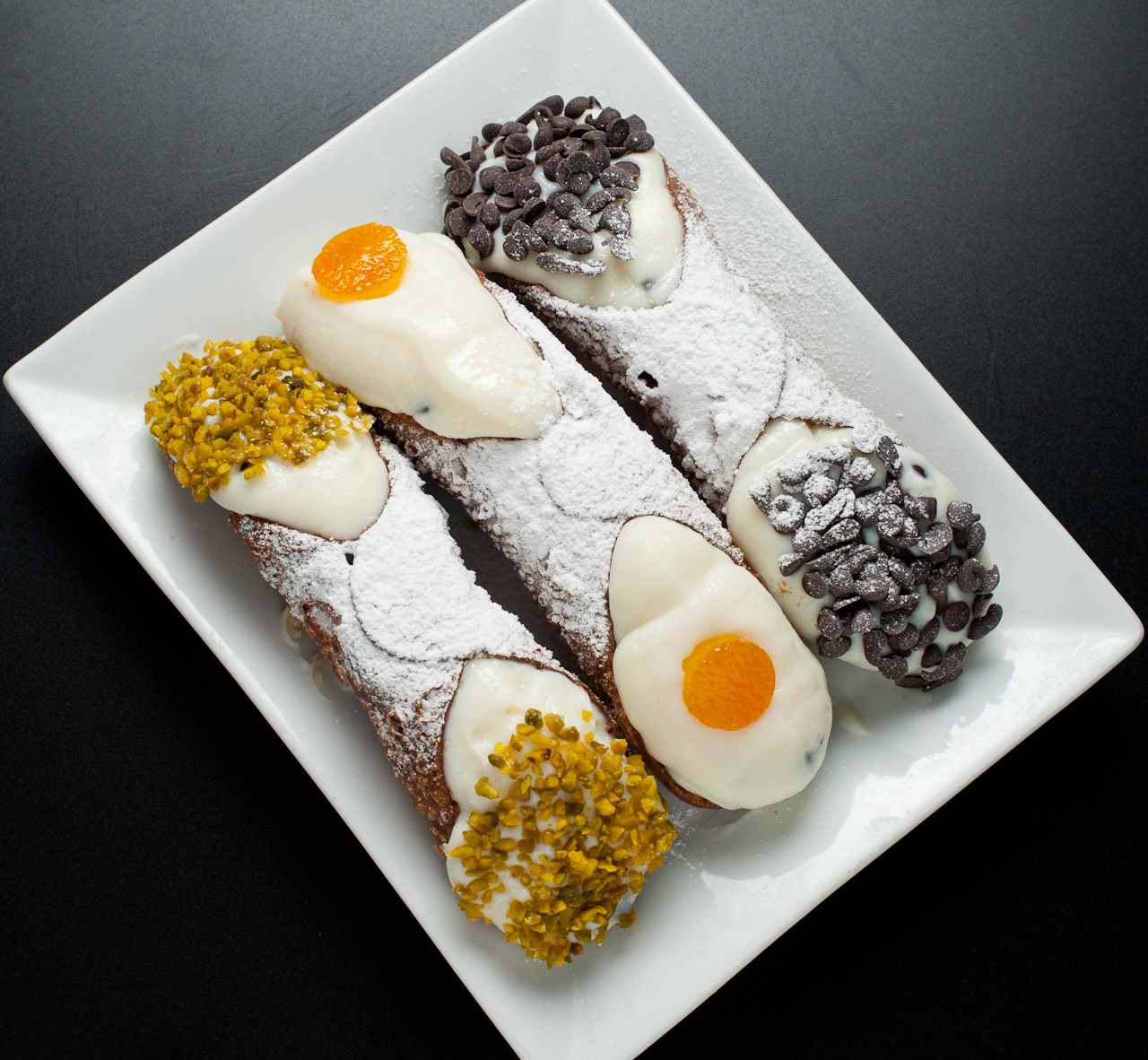
Cannoli with pistachio, candied fruit, and chocolate chips

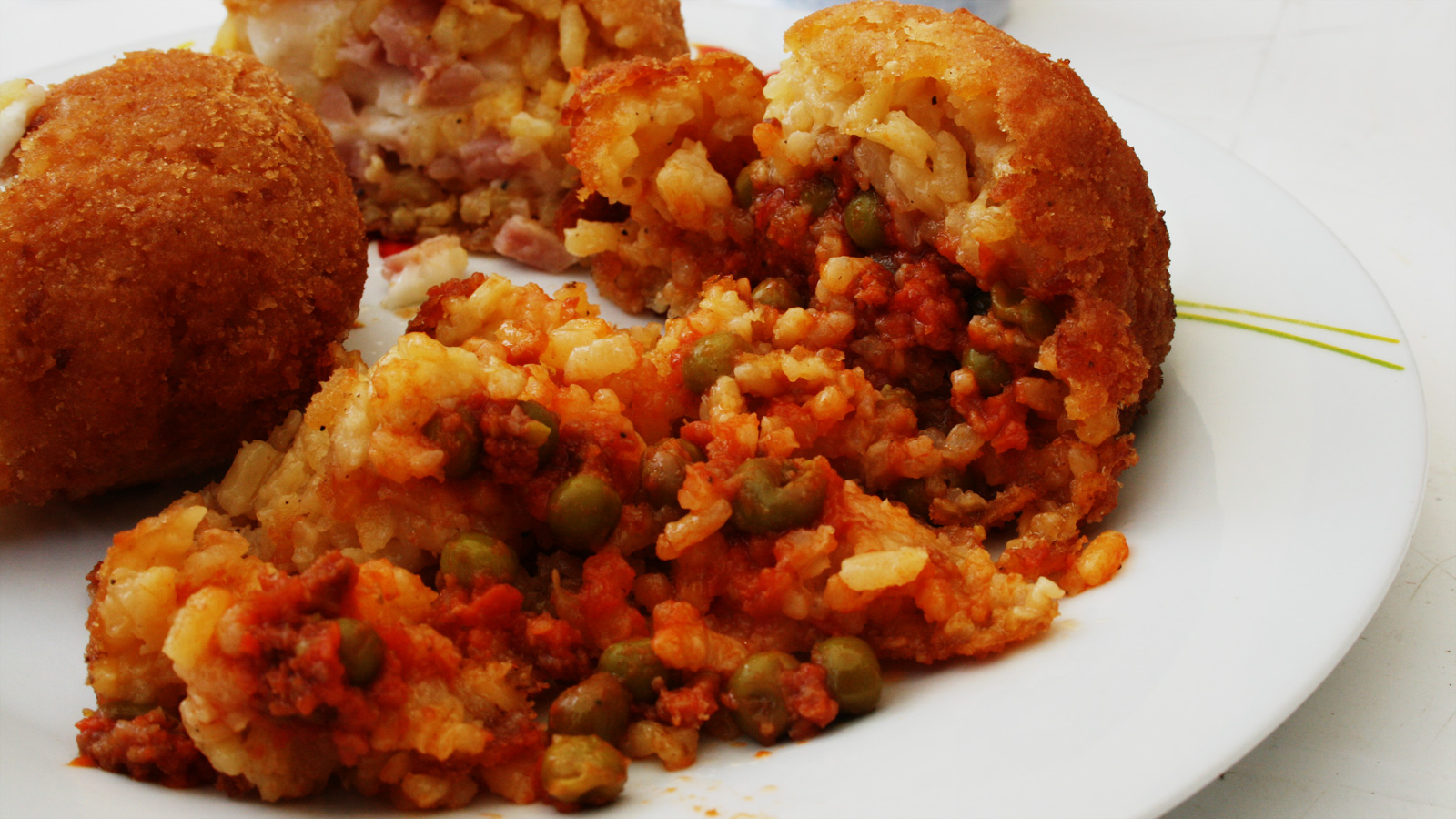
Arancini, rice balls fried in breadcrumbs

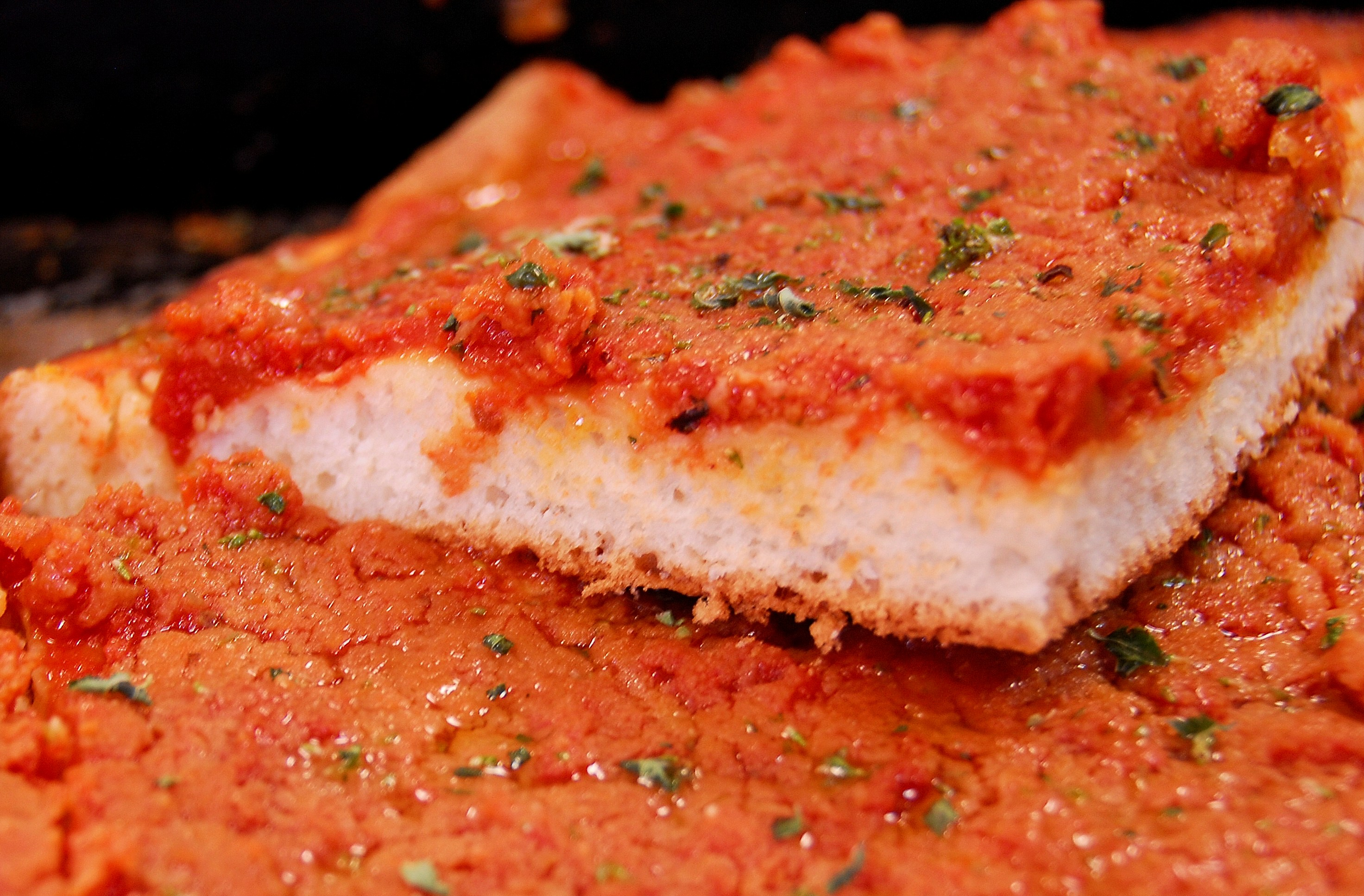
Sicilian pizza

Sicilian cuisine is the style of cooking on the island of Sicily. It shows traces of all cultures that have existed on the island of Sicily over the last two millennia. Although its cuisine has much in common with Italian cuisine, Sicilian food also has Greek, Spanish, Jewish, Maghrebi, and Arab influences. The Sicilian cook Mithaecus, born during the 5th century BC, is credited with having brought knowledge of Sicilian gastronomy to Greece: his cookbook was the first in Greek, therefore he was the earliest cookbook author in any language whose name is known.

Much of the island was initially settled by Greek colonists, who left a preference for fish, wheat, olives, grapes, broad beans, chickpeas, lentils, almonds, pistachios, and fresh vegetables. Arab influences on Sicilian cuisine trace to the Arab domination of Sicily in the 10th and early 11th centuries, and include the use of sugar, citrus, rice, raisins, pine nuts and spices such as saffron, nutmeg, and cinnamon. Norman influences are also found, such as in the fondness for meat dishes. The Jewish community, who lived in the island, also left their mark on the Sicilian cuisine, they were responsible for introducing garlic fried in olive oil into the sauce. Later, the Spanish introduced numerous items from the New World, including cocoa, maize, peppers, zucchini, potatoes, and tomatoes, along with other produce. Much of the island's cuisine encourages the use of fresh vegetables such as eggplant, artichoke, and tomatoes, and fish such as tuna, sea bream, sea bass, cuttlefish, and swordfish. In Trapani in the extreme western corner of the island, North African influences are clear in the use of couscous.

The island has a long history of producing a variety of noted cuisines and wines, to the extent that Sicily is sometimes nicknamed God's Kitchen because of this. Every part of Sicily has its speciality (e.g. Cassata is typical of Palermo although available everywhere in Sicily, as is Granita). The ingredients are typically rich in taste while remaining affordable to the general public. The savoury dishes of Sicily are viewed to be healthy, using fresh vegetables and fruits, such as tomatoes, artichokes, olives (including olive oil), citrus, apricots, aubergines, onions, beans, raisins commonly coupled with seafood, freshly caught from the surrounding coastlines, including tuna, sea bream, sea bass, cuttlefish, swordfish, sardines, and others.

The most well-known part of Sicilian cuisine is the rich sweet dishes including ice creams and pastries. Cannoli (singular: cannolo), a tube-shaped shell of fried pastry dough filled with a sweet filling usually containing ricotta, is strongly associated with Sicily worldwide. Biancomangiare, biscotti ennesi (cookies native to Enna), braccilatte (a Sicilian version of doughnuts), buccellato, ciarduna, pignoli, Biscotti Regina, giurgiulena, frutta martorana, cassata, pignolata, granita, cuccidati (a variety of fig cookie; also known as buccellati) and cuccìa are some notable sweet dishes.

Like the cuisine of the rest of southern Italy, pasta plays an important part in Sicilian cuisine, as does rice; for example with arancini. As well as using some other cheeses, Sicily has spawned some of its own, using both cow's and sheep's milk, such as pecorino and caciocavallo. Spices used include saffron, nutmeg, clove, pepper, and cinnamon, which were introduced by the Arabs. Parsley is used abundantly in many dishes. Although Sicilian cuisine is commonly associated with sea food, meat dishes, including goose, lamb, goat, rabbit, and turkey, are also found in Sicily. It was the Normans and Swabians who first introduced a fondness for meat dishes to the island. Some varieties of wine are produced from vines that are relatively unique to the island, such as the Nero d'Avola made near the baroque town of Noto.

=== Sports ===
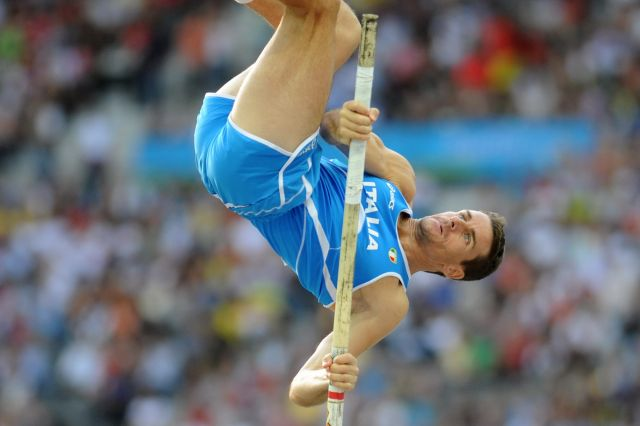
Giuseppe Gibilisco, pole vaulter from Syracuse, 2003 World Champion and bronze Olympic medalist

The most popular sport in Sicily is football, which came to the fore in the late 19th century under the influence of the English. Some of the oldest football clubs in Italy are from Sicily: the three most successful are Palermo, Catania, and Messina, which have played 29, 17 and 5 seasons in the Serie A respectively. No club from Sicily has ever won Serie A, but football is still deeply embedded in local culture and all over Sicily most towns have a representative team.

Palermo and Catania have a heated rivalry and compete in the Sicilian derby together. Palermo is the only team in Sicily to have played on the European stage, in the UEFA Cup. In the island, the most noted footballer is Salvatore Schillaci, who won the Golden Boot at the 1990 FIFA World Cup with Italy. Other noted players include Giuseppe Furino, Pietro Anastasi, Francesco Coco, Christian Riganò, and Roberto Galia. There have also been some noted managers from the island, such as Carmelo Di Bella and Franco Scoglio.

Although football is the most popular sport in Sicily, the island also has participants in other fields. Amatori Catania have competed in the top Italian national rugby union league called National Championship of Excellence. They have even participated at the European level in the European Challenge Cup. Competing in the basketball variation of Serie A is Orlandina Basket from Capo d'Orlando in the province of Messina, where the sport has a reasonable following. Various other sports that are played to some extent include volleyball, handball, and water polo. Previously, in motorsport, Sicily held the prominent Targa Florio sports car race that took place in the Madonie Mountains, with the start-finish line in Cerda. The event was started in 1906 by Sicilian industrialist and automobile enthusiast Vincenzo Florio, and ran until it was cancelled due to safety concerns in 1977.

From 28 September to 9 October 2005 Trapani was the location of Acts 8 and 9 of the Louis Vuitton Cup. This sailing race featured, among other entrants, all boats that took part in the 2007 America's Cup.

=== Popular culture and Traditional items ===
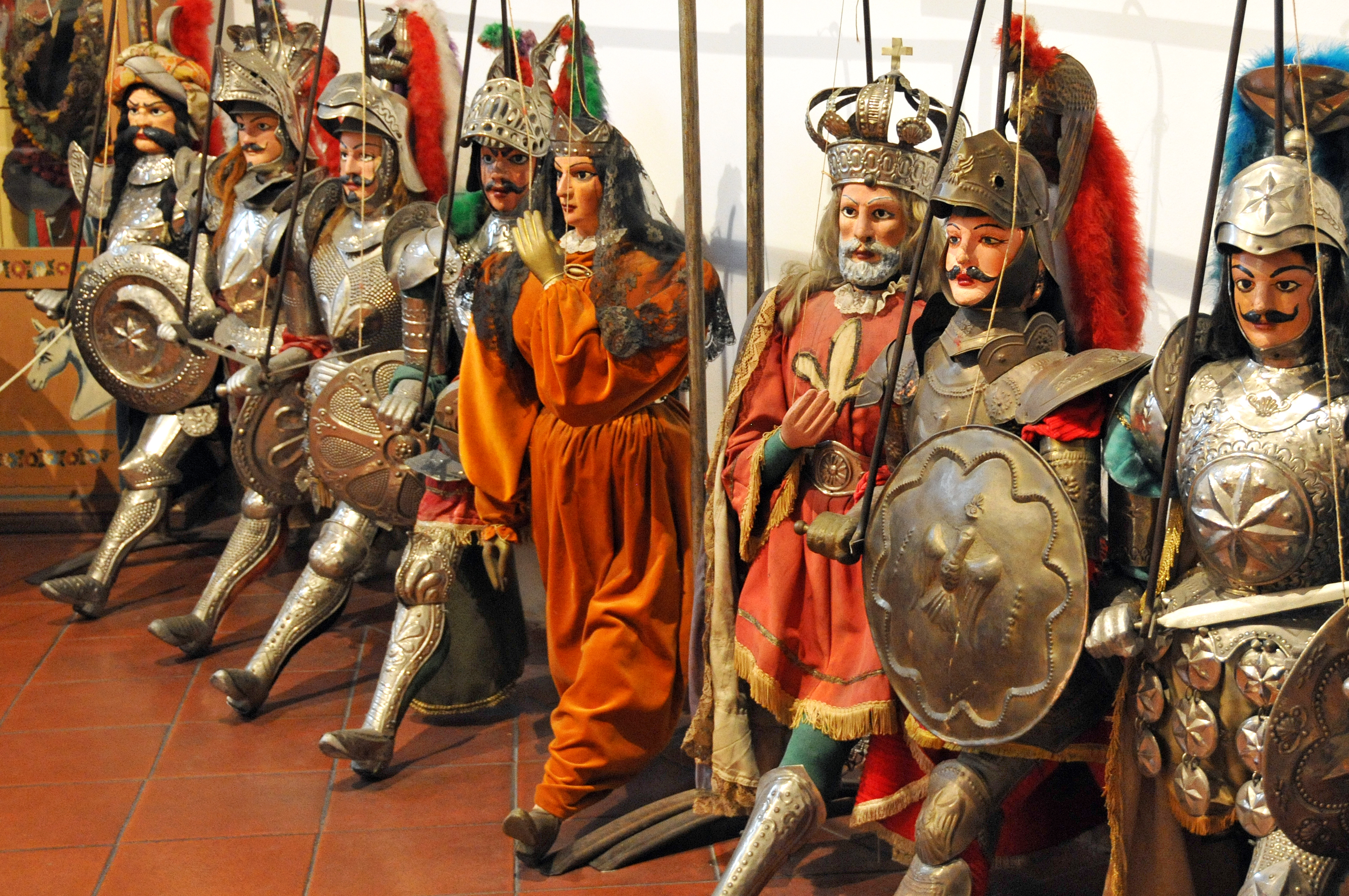
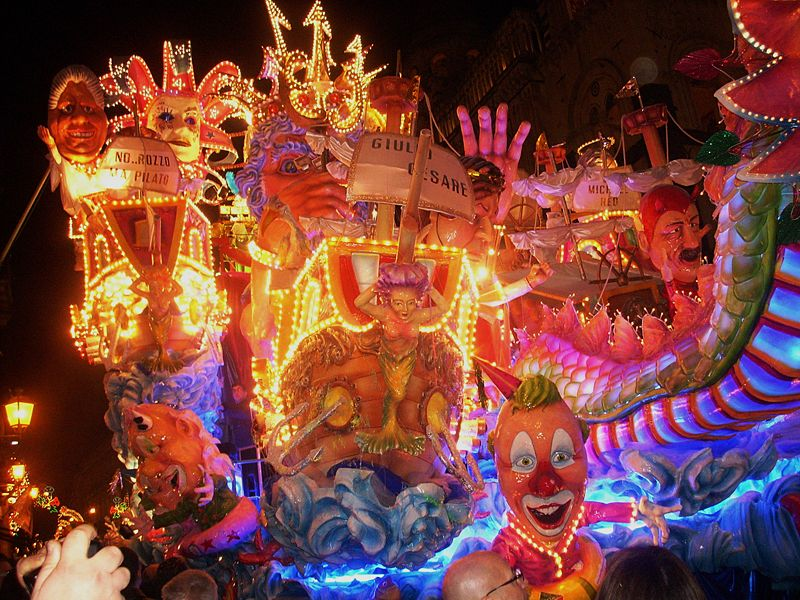
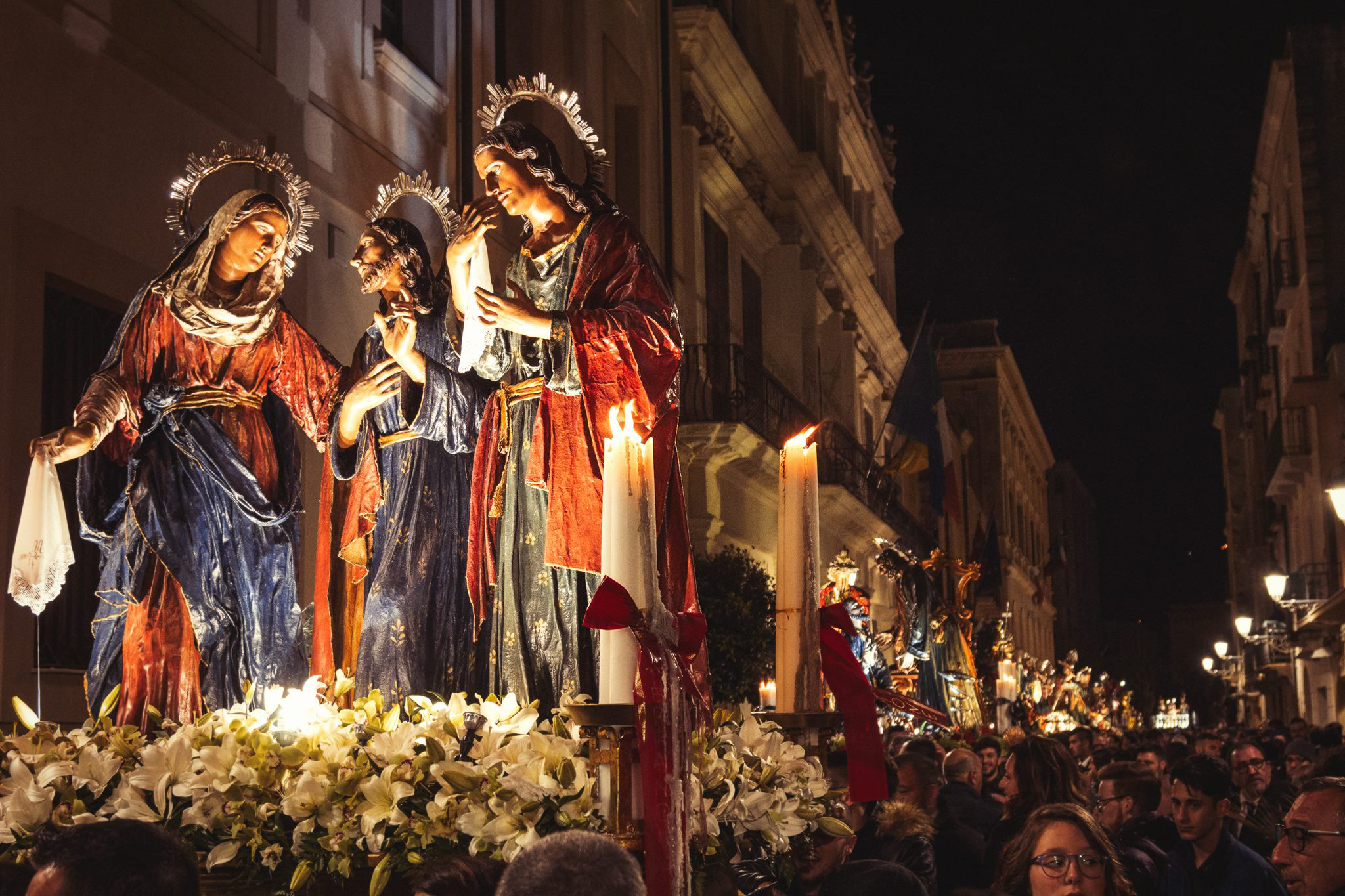
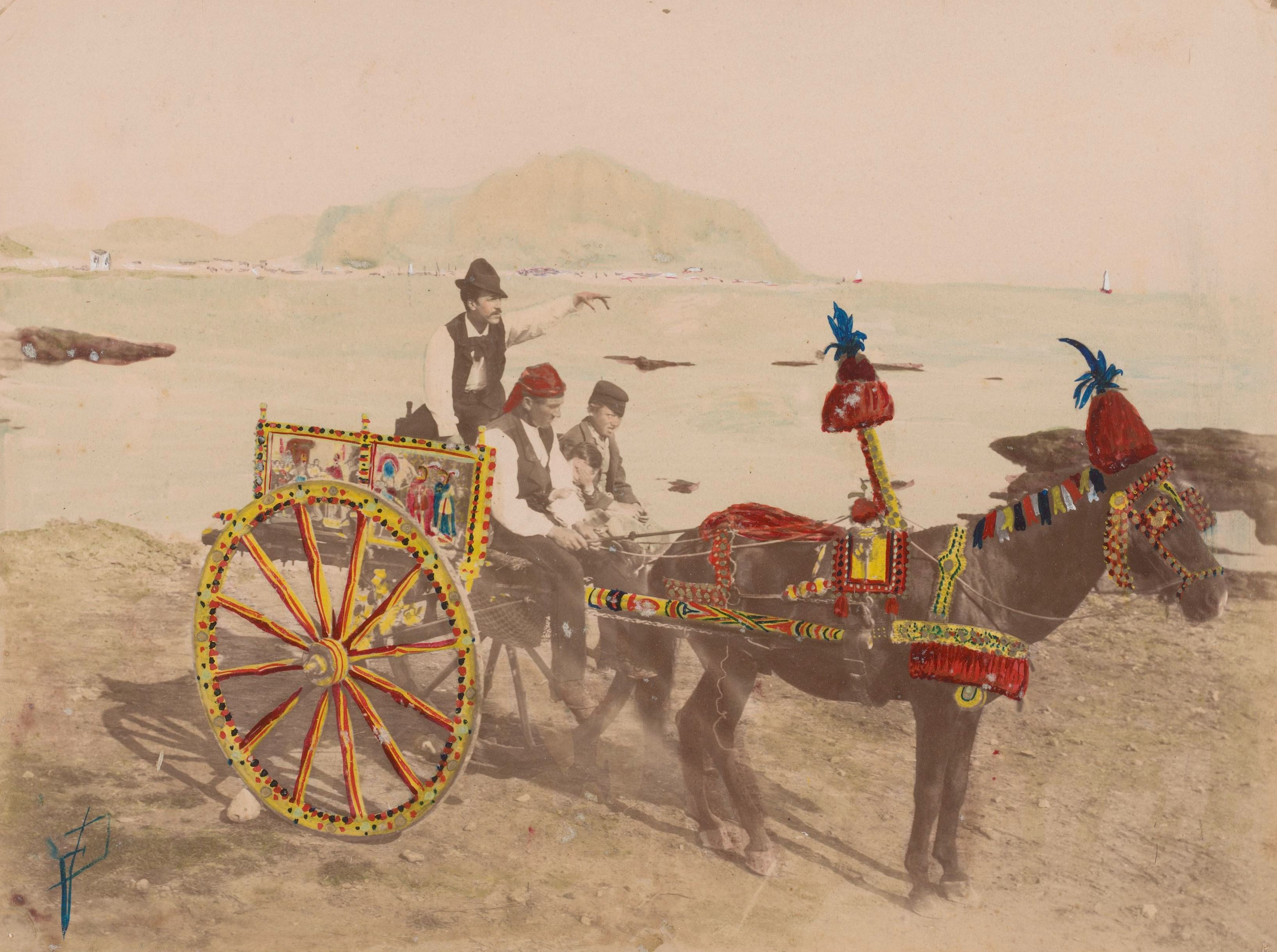
Clockwise from top:
- The marionettes used in the Opera dei Pupi
- The "Misteri", the Holy Week procession in Trapani
- A traditional Sicilian cart, ca. 1860-1900
- The carnival of Acireale

Each town and city has its own patron saint, and the feast days are marked by colourful processions through the streets with marching bands and displays of fireworks.

Sicilian religious festivals also include the presepe vivente (living nativity scene), which takes place at Christmas time. Deftly combining religion and folklore, it is a constructed mock 19th-century Sicilian village, complete with a nativity scene, and has people of all ages dressed in the costumes of the period, some impersonating the Holy Family, and others working as artisans of their particular assigned trade. It is normally concluded on Epiphany, often highlighted by the arrival of the magi on horseback.

Oral tradition plays a large role in Sicilian folklore. Many stories passed down from generation to generation involve a character named "Giufà". Anecdotes from this character's life preserve Sicilian culture as well as convey moral messages.

Sicilians also enjoy outdoor festivals, held in the local square or piazza where live music and dancing are performed on stage, and food fairs or sagre are set up in booths lining the square. These offer various local specialties, as well as typical Sicilian food. Normally these events are concluded with fireworks. A noted sagra is the Sagra del Carciofo or Artichoke Festival, which is held annually in Ramacca in April. The most important traditional event in Sicily is the carnival. Famous carnivals are in Acireale, Misterbianco, Regalbuto, Paternò, Sciacca, Termini Imerese.

The Opera dei Pupi (Opera of the Puppets; Sicilian: Òpira dî pupi) is a marionette theatrical representation of Frankish romantic poems such as the Song of Roland or Orlando furioso that is one of the characteristic cultural traditions of Sicily. The sides of donkey carts are decorated with intricate, painted scenes; these same tales are enacted in traditional puppet theatres featuring hand-made marionettes of wood. The opera of the puppets and the Sicilian tradition of cantastorî (singers of tales) are rooted in the Provençal troubadour tradition in Sicily during the reign of Frederick II, Holy Roman Emperor, in the first half of the 13th century. A great place to see this marionette art is the puppet theatres of Palermo. The Sicilian marionette theatre Opera dei Pupi was proclaimed in 2001 and inscribed in 2008 in the UNESCO Intangible Cultural Heritage Lists.

Today, there are only a few troupes that maintain the tradition. They often perform for tourists. However, there are no longer the great historical families of marionettists, such as the Greco of Palermo; the Canino of Partinico and Alcamo; Crimi, Trombetta and Napoli of Catania, Pennisi and Macri of Acireale, Profeta of Licata, Gargano and Grasso of Agrigento. One can, however, admire the richest collection of marionettes at the Museo Internazionale delle Marionette Antonio Pasqualino and at the Museo Etnografico Siciliano Giuseppe Pitrè in Palermo. Other elaborate marionettes are on display at the Museo Civico Vagliasindi in Randazzo.

The Sicilian cart is an ornate, colourful style of a horse- or donkey-drawn cart native to Sicily. Sicilian woodcarver George Petralia states that horses were mostly used in the city and flat plains, while donkeys or mules were more often used in rough terrain for hauling heavy loads. The cart has two wheels and is primarily handmade out of wood with iron components.

The Sicilian coppola is a traditional kind of flat cap typically worn by men in Sicily. First used by English nobles during the late 18th century, the tascu began being used in Sicily in the early 20th century as a driving cap, usually worn by car drivers. The coppola is usually made in tweed. Today it is widely regarded as a definitive symbol of Sicilian heritage.

=== Flag and emblem ===
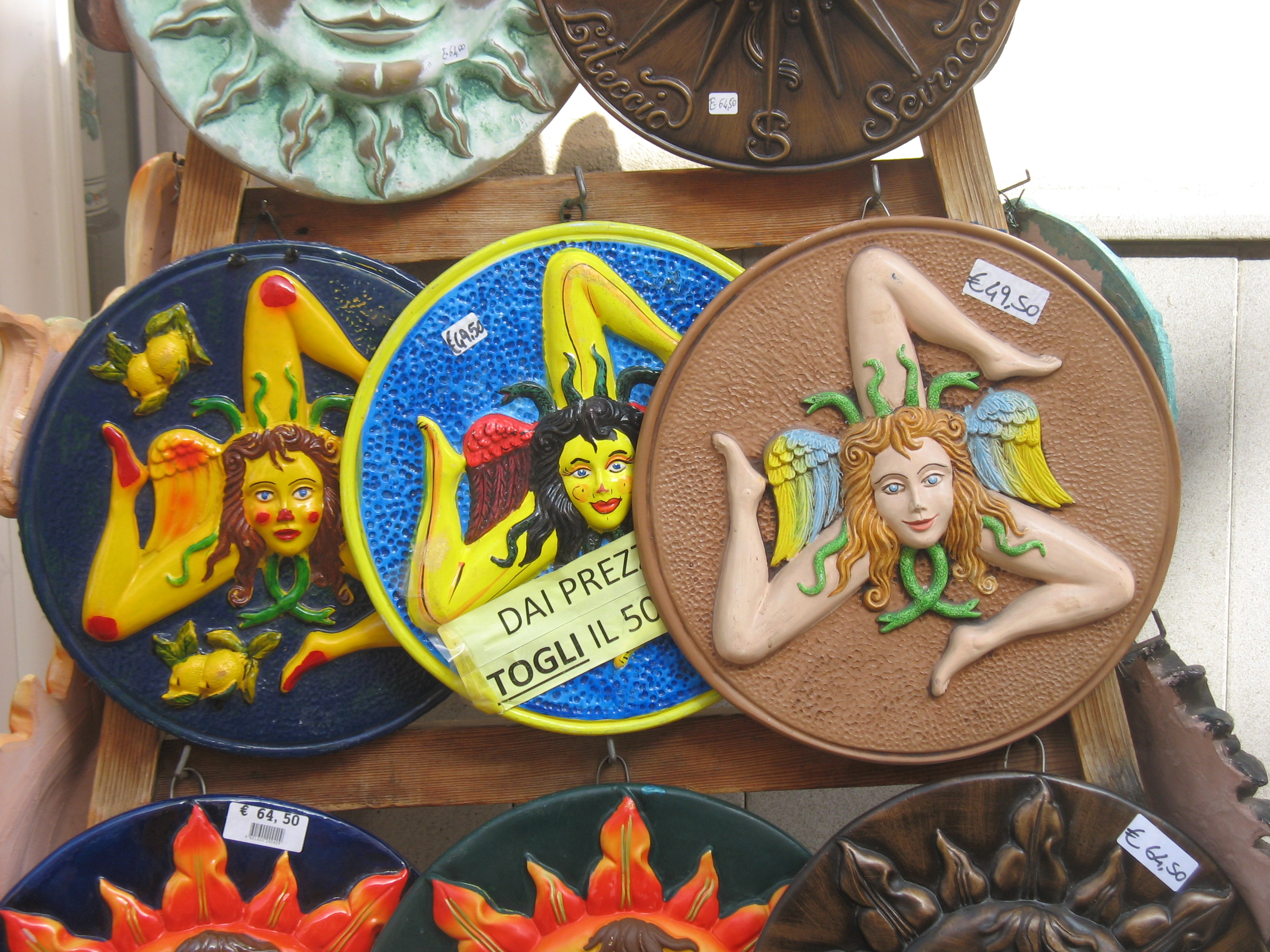
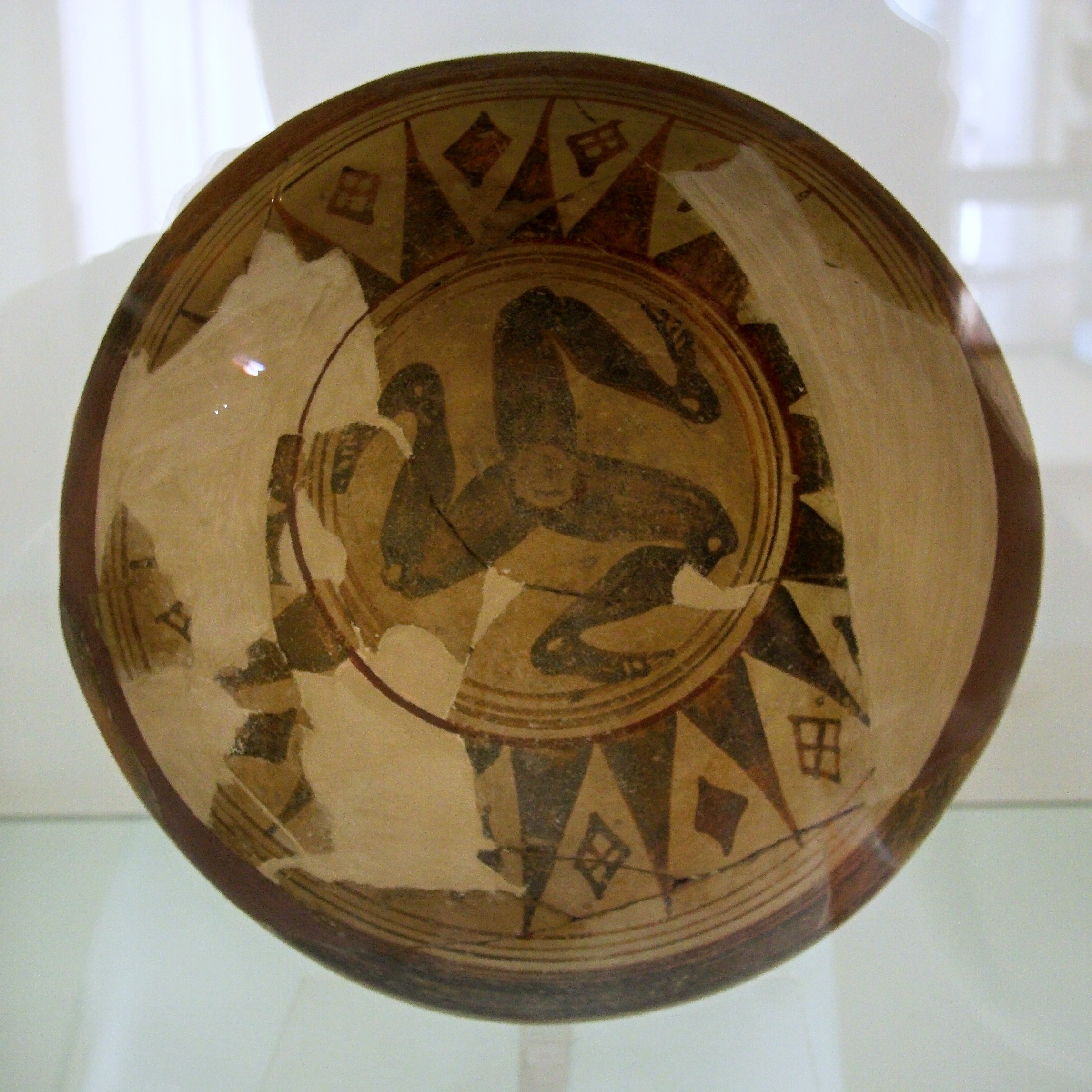
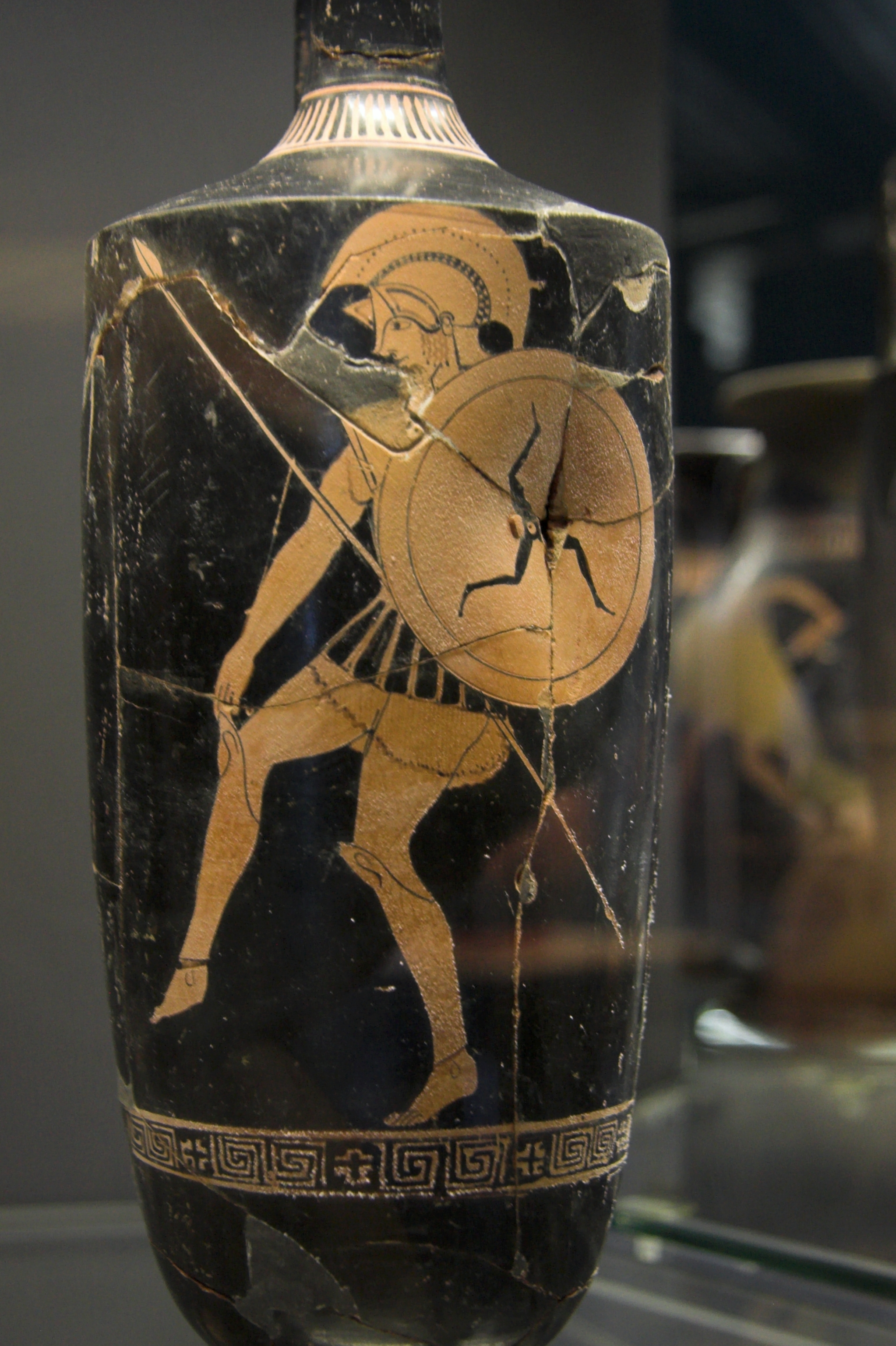
Clockwise from top:
- The Triskelion and Gorgoneion symbol of Sicily
- Red-figure Lekythos from a tomb near Licata, ca. 470 BCE, depicting a warrior with a triskelion on the shield
- Triskelion painted on Ancient Greek of Magna Graecia vase, Agrigento

The Flag of Sicily, regarded as a regional icon, was first adopted in 1282, after the Sicilian Vespers of Palermo. It is characterised by the presence of the triskeles in the middle, depicting the head of Medusa and three wheat ears representing the extreme fertility of the land of Sicily. In early mythology, when Medusa was slain and beheaded by Perseus, the Medusa head was placed in the centre of Athena's shield.

Palermo and Corleone were the first two cities to found a confederation against the Angevin rule. The triskeles symbol came to be on the Sicilian flag in 1943 during World War II when Andrea Finocchiaro Aprile led an independence movement, in collaboration with the allies. Their plan was to help Sicily become independent and form a free republic. The colours, likewise introduced in the 1940s, respectively represent the cities of Palermo and Corleone. The separatist behind the movement used a yellow and red flag with the Trinacria in the centre of it. When World War II ended, Sicily was recognized as an autonomous region in the Italian Republic.

The flag became the official public flag of the Regione Siciliana in January 2000, after the passing of an apposite regional law, which advocates its use on public buildings, schools and city halls along with the national Italian flag and the European one.

Familiar as an ancient symbol of the region, the Triskelion is also featured on Greek coins of Syracuse, such as coins of Agathocles (317–289 BC).The symbol dates back to when Sicily was part of Magna Graecia, the colonial extension of Greece beyond the Aegean. The triskelion was revived, as a neoclassic – and non-Bourbon – emblem for the new Napoleonic Kingdom of the Two Sicilies, by Joachim Murat in 1808. In the case of Sicily, the triskelion symbol is said to represent the three capes (headlands or promontories of the island of Sicily, namely: Pelorus (Peloro, Tip of Faro, Messina: North-East); Pachynus (Passero, Syracuse: South); and Lilybæum (Lilibeo, Cape Boeo, Marsala: West), which form three points of a triangle.

== See also ==
- List of islands of Italy
- List of islands in the Mediterranean
- List of people from Sicily
