= Evander Holyfield vs. James Tillis =

Professional Boxing Match

- Date: July 16, 1988
- Venue: Caesars Tahoe, Stateline, Nevada, U.S.

Tale of the tape
Boxer	Evander Holyfield	James Tillis
Nickname	The Real Deal	Quick
Hometown	Atlanta, Georgia, U.S.	Tulsa, Oklahoma, U.S.
Pre-fight record	18–0 (14 KO)	38–14–1 (29 KO)
Age	25 years, 8 months	31 years
Height	6 ft 1 in (185 cm)	6 ft 1 in (185 cm)
Weight	202 lb (92 kg)	210 lb (95 kg)
Style	Orthodox	Orthodox
Recognition	WBA, WBC and IBF undisputed Cruiserweight Champion	

Result
- Holyfield wins via fifth-round corner retirement

Evander Holyfield vs. James Tillis was a professional boxing match contested on July 16, 1988. The fight is notable for being Holyfield's first in the heavyweight division.

== Background ==
Evander Holyfield had previously defeated Carlos De León to add the WBC cruiserweight title to the WBA and IBF versions already in his possession and become the first undisputed champion in the division's history. After the victory, Holyfield announced his attentions to move up to heavyweight and veteran fighter and former contender James Tillis was eventually named his first opponent. Holyfield was expected to be a future challenger to then-undisputed heavyweight champion Mike Tyson, whom Tillis had fought two years prior to his fight with Holyfield. Though Tillis would lose, he had an impressive showing against Tyson, being the first person to go the distance with him and ending Tyson's 19-fight knockout streak. Though he was no longer a contender, Tillis' experience against several top heavyweights led to Holyfield's promoter Dan Duva selecting him as Holyfield's first heavyweight opponent. Tillis had formally been a top contender in the heavyweight division, starting his career with a 20–0 record and facing Mike Weaver in 1981 for the WBA heavyweight title, though he would lose a 15-round unanimous decision. Since then, Tillis' career had veered largely into journeyman status, facing and losing to several top heavyweights, including future and former champions Tim Witherspoon and Frank Bruno. Though Tillis was considered an underdog against Holyfield, he remained confident he could earn an upset victory and gain a lucrative rematch against Tyson.

== The fight ==
Holyfield would have little trouble with Tillis, earning a relatively easy referee technical knockout victory. There was a brief controversy at the end of round two as Holyfield and Tillis traded punches well after the bell rang. Holyfield's trainer Lou Duva got on the ring apron and restrained Tillis against the ropes which incited Williford who ran across the ring and shoved Duva before referee Richard Steele separated the two trainers. In round five Holyfield would hurt Tillis with several power punches in the final minute of the round. Tillis, with his back against the ropes, would barely make it out of the round as Holyfield landed a flurry of punches in the closing seconds. A clearly dazed Tillis returned to his corner where referee Steele called for the ringside doctor, whom advised Tillis to not continue, giving Holyfield the victory by referee technical knockout.

== Aftermath ==
After the fight Holyfield would say that "It was not my best performance, but it got the job done. Weight wasn't a big issue. I wanted to go in confident and bring some strength."

== Fight card ==
Confirmed bouts:

Weight Class	Weight		vs.		Method	Round	Time	Notes
Heavyweight	200+ lb	Evander Holyfield	def.	James Tillis	RTD	5/10
Super Lightweight	140 lb	Frankie Warren	def.	Clarence Coleman	UD	12
Lightweight	135 lb	John John Molina	def.	Miguel Medina	TKO	8/10
Heavyweight	200+ lb	Randy Johnson	def.	Steve Harvey	TKO	1/6
Middleweight	160 lb	Elias Mayorga	def	Richard LeFevre	UD	4/4
Super Lightweight	140 lb	Billy Martinez	def.	Jesse Madrilles	TKO	4/4

== Broadcasting ==
Country	Broadcaster
United States	Showtime

Preceded by vs. Carlos De León	Evander Holyfield's bouts 16 July 1988	Succeeded by vs. Pinklon Thomas
Preceded by vs. Rodney Smith	James Tillis's bouts 16 July 1988	Succeeded by vs. Gary Mason
