= Evander Holyfield vs. Carlos De León =

Boxing match

- Date: April 9, 1988
- Venue: Caesars Palace, Paradise, Nevada, U.S.
- Title(s) on the line: WBA, WBC and IBF undisputed cruiserweight championship

Tale of the tape
| Boxer | Evander Holyfield | Carlos De León |
| Nickname | The Real Deal | Sugar |
| Hometown | Atlanta, Georgia, U.S. | Trujillo Alto, Puerto Rico |
| Pre-fight record | 17–0 (13 KO) | 44–4 (29 KO) |
| Age | 25 years, 5 months | 28 years, 11 months |
| Height | 6 ft 2 in (188 cm) | 6 ft 0 in (183 cm) |
| Weight | 190 lb (86 kg) | 188 lb (85 kg) |
| Style | Orthodox | Orthodox |
| Recognition | WBA and IBF; Cruiserweight Champion | WBC; Cruiserweight Champion |

Result
- Holyfield defeated De León via 8th round TKO

Evander Holyfield vs. Carlos De León was a professional boxing match contested for the undisputed cruiserweight championship. The bout took place on April 9, 1988 at Caesars Palace in Paradise, Nevada.

== Background ==
In February 1988, a unification match between reigning WBA and IBF cruiserweight champion Evander Holyfield and the reigning WBC cruiserweight champion Carlos De León was agreed upon. However, while the WBC agreed to sanction the bout, both the WBA and IBF were hesitant as the WBC had a weight limit of 195 pounds for the cruiserweight division while both the WBA and IBF adhered to a 190-pound weight limit. At the time, the IBF still scheduled their championship fights at 15-rounds in contrast to the WBC's 12, though IBF president Bob Lee stated he would allow a 12-round fight due to an undisputed title being at stake. The WBC would soon follow suit with the WBA and IBF and agreed to reduce their weight limit back to 190 pounds, which it would remain until 2003, when all four major sanctioning bodies (including the WBO) moved the weight limit up to 200 pounds.

The fight was expected to be Holyfield's final as a cruiserweight, after which he was to move up to the heavyweight division and face James "Quick" Tillis in his first fight in that division. Holyfield was being touted as a potential opponent for the then-undisputed heavyweight champion Mike Tyson, with the two expected to meet after Holyfield had fought a series of fights to get comfortable as a heavyweight. Tyson, along with his then-wife Robin Givens, attended the fight, though the two would ultimately not meet until 1996.

== The fight ==
The fight was the only one of Holyfield's five cruiserweight title defenses on which Holyfield failed to record a knockdown, though he controlled the entire fight and brutalized De León throughout, who fought a more defensive style as he remained with back against the ropes for nearly the entire fight as Holyfield landed punches at will. In the eight round, the fight would come to an end after Holyfield landed 20 unanswered punches as De León offered no offense, referee Mills Lane stopped the fight, giving Holyfield a technical knockout victory at 1:08 of the round. At the time of the stoppage, Holyfield was ahead on by scores of 70–61, 70–63 and 69–64, the first two judges had Holyfield winning every round while the latter gave De León the first.

== Aftermath ==
At the postfight news conference, when Holyfield was asked "Evander, you hit DeLeon a couple of hundred times with clean shots and you didn't knock him down. How can you hope to hurt Tyson?" his trainer, Lou Duva replied "Hey, hasn't it occurred to you that this guy had a pretty good chin?"

== Fight card ==
Confirmed bouts:

| Weight Class | Weight | | vs. | | Method | Round | Time | Notes |
|---|---|---|---|---|---|---|---|---|
| Cruiserweight | 190 lbs. | Evander Holyfield (c) | def. | Carlos De León (c) | TKO | 8/12 | | ^{Note 1} |
| Welterweight | 147 lbs. | Javier Suazo | def. | Vincent Pettway | KO | 6/10 |
| Super Lightweight | 140 lbs. | Meldrick Taylor | def. | Ivan Gonzalez | TKO | 5/10 |
| Bantamweight | 118 lbs. | Juan Carazo | def | Tim Silva | TKO | 6/10 |
| Cruiserweight | 190 lbs. | Patrick Lumumba | def. | Jeff Lampkin | PTS | 8/8 |
| Heavyweight | 200+ lbs. | James Tillis | def | Rodney Smith | KO | 2/10 |

^Note 1 For WBA, WBC, and IBF cruiserweight titles

== Broadcasting ==
| Country | Broadcaster |
|---|---|
| United States | Showtime |

== See also ==
- Jean-Marc Mormeck vs. O'Neil Bell
- Oleksandr Usyk vs. Murat Gassiev

| Preceded by vs. Dwight Muhammad Qawi II | Evander Holyfield's bouts 9 April 1988 | Succeeded by vs. James Tillis |
| Preceded by vs. Jose Maria Flores Burlon | Carlos De León's bouts 9 April 1988 | Succeeded by vs. Sammy Reeson |
