= S. T. Gordon =

American boxer

Personal information
- Nationality: American
- Born: April 18, 1959 (age 67) Pasco, Washington, USA
- Height: 6 ft 0 in (183 cm)
- Weight: Cruiserweight

Boxing career
- Reach: 78"
- Stance: Orthodox

Boxing record
- Total fights: 27
- Wins: 20
- Win by KO: 17
- Losses: 7

S.T. Gordon (born April 18, 1959) is an American former professional boxer who held the WBC and Lineal cruiserweight titles from 1982 to 1983.

== Professional boxing career ==
Gordon became a professional boxer in 1977. He faced undefeated heavyweight prospect Gerry Cooney in 1978 but lost via a fourth-round disqualification. In 1981 he beat aging contender Yaqui Lopez for the North American Boxing Federation cruiserweight title. The next year he won the Lineal and WBC cruiserweight titles with a technical knockout victory over Carlos De León. The champion refused to defend the belt against the number one contender David Pearce in his first defence in the United States, and could not defend his belt in Great Britain because of the BBBoC reluctance to recognise the Cruiserweight division in the UK.

S. T. Gordon went on to defend the title once and also won a heavyweight bout against future titlist Trevor Berbick before losing his cruiserweight title in 1983 in a rematch with De Leon. He retired after the loss but had a brief comeback in 1987 but was knocked out in the first round by Dwain Bonds.

== Professional boxing record ==
27 fights	20 wins	7 losses
By knockout	17	1
By decision	3	5
By disqualification	0	1

No.	Result	Record	Opponent	Type	Round	Date	Location	Notes
27	Loss	20–7	(United States) Dwain Bonds	TKO	1 (8)	Oct 15, 1987	(United States) El Cortez Hotel, San Diego, California, U.S.	
26	Loss	20–6	(Puerto Rico) Carlos De León	UD	12	Jul 17, 1983	(United States) Dunes Hotel, Las Vegas, Nevada, U.S.	Lost WBC cruiserweight title
25	Win	20–5	(Jamaica) Trevor Berbick	UD	10	May 28, 1983	(United States) Showboat Hotel & Casino, Las Vegas, Nevada, U.S.	
24	Win	19–5	(United States) Jesse Burnett	TKO	8 (12)	Feb 16, 1983	(United States) Meadowlands Arena, East Rutherford, New Jersey, U.S.	Retained WBC cruiserweight title
23	Win	18–5	(Puerto Rico) Carlos De León	TKO	2 (15)	Jun 27, 1982	(United States) Front Row Theatre, Highland Heights, Ohio, U.S.	Won WBC cruiserweight title
22	Win	17–5	(Mexico) Yaqui López	TKO	7 (12)	Jul 24, 1981	(United States) MGM Grand Hotel, Reno, Nevada, U.S.	Retained USBA California State cruiserweight title
21	Win	16–5	(United States) David Smith	UD	12	Feb 25, 1981	(United States) Forum, Inglewood, California, U.S.	Won vacant USBA California State cruiserweight title
20	Win	15–5	(United States) Harry Terrell	TKO	5 (12)	Feb 10, 1981	(United States) Civic Auditorium, Santa Monica, California, U.S.	Won vacant USBA cruiserweight title
19	Win	14–5	(United States) Earl Tripp	KO	4 (?)	Oct 22, 1980	(United States) Civic Auditorium, Santa Monica, California, U.S.	
18	Win	13–5	(United States) Ivy Brown	KO	2 (12)	Aug 06, 1980	(United States) Civic Auditorium, Santa Monica, California, U.S.	Won vacant NABF cruiserweight title
17	Win	12–5	(Samoa) Niua Tofaeono	TKO	2 (10)	May 24, 1980	(United States) Civic Auditorium, Santa Monica, California, U.S.	
16	Win	11–5	(United States) Eric Sedillo	KO	5 (10)	Mar 15, 1980	(United States) Weber State College Gymnasium, Ogden, Utah, U.S.	
15	Win	10–5	(United States) Bobby Gatewood	KO	2 (?)	Jul 04, 1979	(United States) Nogales, Arizona, U.S.	
14	Win	9–5	(United States) Earl Tripp	KO	7 (10)	Jun 06, 1979	(United States) Silver Slipper, Las Vegas, Nevada, U.S.	Won vacant USA Nevada cruiserweight title
13	Win	8–5	(United States) Fred Houpe	KO	4 (10)	Nov 11, 1978	(United States) Special Events Center, Salt Lake City, Utah, U.S.	
12	Loss	7–5	(United States) Earl Tripp	UD	10	Oct 18, 1978	(United States) Silver Slipper, Las Vegas, Nevada, U.S.	
11	Loss	7–4	(United States) Eddie López	UD	10	Aug 28, 1978	(United States) Sports Arena, Pico Rivera, California, U.S.	
10	Win	7–3	(Samoa) Vaiao Suafoa	KO	5 (?)	Apr 19, 1978	(United States) Silver Slipper, Las Vegas, Nevada, U.S.	
9	Loss	6–3	(United States) Gerry Cooney	DQ	4 (6)	Mar 17, 1978	(United States) The Aladdin, Las Vegas, Nevada, U.S.	Gordon disqualified for repeated holding
8	Win	6–2	(Samoa) Vaiao Suafoa	KO	5 (?)	Jan 17, 1978	(United States) Silver Slipper, Las Vegas, Nevada, U.S.	
7	Win	5–2	(United States) Dave Ochoa	TKO	1 (6)	Nov 09, 1977	(United States) Marina Hotel, Las Vegas, Nevada, U.S.	
6	Loss	4–2	(United States) Mike Creel	SD	5	Jul 28, 1977	(United States) Community Center, Tucson, Arizona, U.S.	
5	Win	4–1	(United States) Howard Snyder	TKO	1 (6)	Jun 15, 1977	(United States) Silver Slipper, Las Vegas, Nevada, U.S.	
4	Win	3–1	(United States) Richard Janssen	UD	4	May 6, 1977	(United States) Adams Field House, Missoula, Montana, U.S.	
3	Win	2–1	(United States) Richard Dean	KO	1 (5)	Apr 20, 1977	(United States) Silver Slipper, Las Vegas, Nevada, U.S.	
2	Win	1–1	(United States) Abelardo Meraz	KO	1 (5)	Mar 24, 1977	(United States) Silver Slipper, Las Vegas, Nevada, U.S.	
1	Loss	0–1	(United States) Alvaro Lopez	UD	5	Feb 23, 1977	(United States) Silver Slipper, Las Vegas, Nevada, U.S.	

== See also ==
- List of cruiserweight boxing champions
- List of WBA world champions

Sporting positions
World boxing titles
Preceded by Carlos De León	Lineal Cruiserweight Champion; June 27, 1982 – July 17, 1983	Succeeded by Carlos De León
Preceded by Carlos De León	WBC Cruiserweight Champion; June 27, 1982 – July 17, 1983	Succeeded by Carlos De León
