= Yaqui López =

Mexican boxer (born 1951)

Yaqui Lopez
Personal information
- Nickname: Yaqui
- Nationality: (Mexico) Mexican
- Born: Álvaro López; May 21, 1951 (age 75) Zacatecas, Mexico
- Height: 6 ft 3 in (192 cm)
- Weight: Heavyweight; Cruiserweight; Light Heavyweight

Boxing career
- Reach: 77 in (197 cm)
- Stance: Orthodox

Boxing record
- Total fights: 76
- Wins: 61
- Win by KO: 39
- Losses: 15

Álvaro López (born May 21, 1951, in Zacatecas, Mexico), known as Yaqui López is a former Mexican boxer and current member of the World Boxing Hall of Fame (not to be confused with the International Boxing Hall of Fame). A native of Zacatecas, López is considered by many as one of the greatest Light Heavyweights to never become world champion.

== Early life ==
López was born in Zacatecas, Mexico.

A young López had dreams of becoming a Matador. During his first bull fight when López was in his teens, a bull drove its horns into his ankle and shattered it. Due to his injury, López decided not to purse a bull fighting career.

== Amateur career ==
López ended his amateur boxing career with a record of 13–3. At the Diamond Belt Championship in Eureka, California, he knocked out the defending champion to win the title.

== Professional career ==
In April 1972, Álvaro won his pro debut against Herman Hampton at the Civic Auditorium in Stockton, California. The two would rematch in Carson City, Nevada less than two months later, with Álvaro stopping the bout early by knockout in the 2nd round.

=== WBC Light Heavyweight Championship ===
On October 9, 1976, López lost a unanimous decision to world champion John Conteh. The fight was held in Denmark.

=== WBA Light Heavyweight Championship ===
Álvaro met Víctor Galíndez in two installments for the WBA Light Heavyweight Championship. The fights were held in Italy. Some boxing writers thought that Álvaro won the fights, though the decision victories went to the champion, Galíndez.

He was one of the few boxers of his time to challenge James Scott at the Rahway State Prison.

=== 1980 Fight of the Year ===
López would later fight in Ring Magazine's 1980 Fight of the Year against WBC Light Heavyweight Champion, Matthew Saad Muhammad. López dominated the first half of the fight, but all three score cards very close up until the fourteenth round. López eventually ran out of energy to continue fighting and was stopped.

=== WBC Cruiserweight Championship ===
In Álvaro's last world title attempt, he would lose to the much younger WBC Cruiserweight Champion, Carlos De León. López would then wait almost a year before fighting Bash Ali. Following the match, he retired from boxing.

== Legacy ==
Lopez is a member of both the California Boxing Hall of Fame and the World Boxing Hall of Fame. He has his own gym named after him, Yaqui Lopez's Fat City Boxing.

== Professional boxing record ==
61 Wins (39 knockouts, 22 decisions), 15 Losses (6 knockouts, 9 decisions)
Res.	Record	Opponent	Type	Round	Date	Location	Notes
Loss	61-15	(Nigeria) Bash Ali	SD	12	12-09-1984	Stockton, California, United States	
Loss	61-14	(Puerto Rico) Carlos De Leon	TKO	4 (12)	21-09-1983	San Jose, California, United States	For WBC cruiserweight title
Win	61-13	(United States) Eddie Gonzales	UD	10	07-05-1983	Stateline, Nevada, United States	
Win	60-13	(United States) Mike Jameson	UD	10	19-02-1983	Incline Village, Nevada, United States	
Win	59-13	(United States) James Williams	UD	10	27-11-1982	Incline Village, Nevada, United States	
Win	58-13	(United States) Roger Braxton	UD	10	09-09-1982	Stateline, Nevada, United States	
Win	57-13	(United States) Ken Arlt	UD	10	31-07-1982	Incline Village, Nevada, United States	
Win	56-13	(United States) David Smith	UD	12	01-06-1982	Sacramento, California, United States	Won California cruiserweight title
Win	55-13	(United States) Alvin Dominey	TKO	6 (10)	05-05-1982	Stockton, California, United States	
Loss	54-13	(United States) Johnny Davis	UD	10	14-01-1982	Atlantic City, New Jersey, United States	
Win	54-12	(Australia) Tony Mundine	TKO	3 (12)	27-11-1981	Gold Coast, Queensland, Australia	
Loss	53-12	(United States) ST Gordon	TKO	7 (12)	24-07-1981	Reno, Nevada, United States	For WBC-NABF cruiserweight title
Win	53-11	(United States) Willie Taylor	KO	7 (10)	27-05-1981	Stockton, California, United States	
Win	52-11	(United States) George O'Mara	TKO	10 (10)	18-03-1981	San Carlos, California, United States	
Win	51-11	(United States) Grover Robinson	KO	4 (10)	14-02-1981	Incline Village, Nevada, United States	
Win	50-11	(United States) Carl Ivy	KO	3 (10)	29-11-1980	Incline Village, Nevada, United States	
Loss	49-11	(United States) Michael Spinks	TKO	7 (10)	18-10-1980	Atlantic City, New Jersey, United States	
Loss	49-10	(United States) Matthew Muhammad	TKO	14 (15)	13-07-1980	McAfee, New Jersey, United States	For WBC light heavyweight title
Win	49-9	(The Bahamas) Bobby Lloyd	KO	8 (10)	20-05-1980	Fresno, California, United States	
Win	48-9	(United States) Pete McIntyre	KO	8 (12)	16-04-1980	Fresno, California, United States	
Loss	47-9	(United States) James Scott	UD	10	01-12-1979	Woodbridge, New Jersey, United States	
Win	47-8	(Nigeria) Bash Ali	UD	10	04-10-1979	Redwood City, California, United States	
Win	46-8	(The Bahamas) Andros Ernie Barr	KO	4 (10)	12-09-1979	Stockton, California, United States	
Win	45-8	(United States) Ivy Brown	KO	3 (10)	27-02-1979	Sacramento, California, United States	
Win	44-8	(United States) Wilbert Albers	KO	3 (10)	18-01-1979	Stockton, California, United States	
Loss	43-8	(United States) Matthew Muhammad	TKO	11 (12)	24-10-1978	Philadelphia, Pennsylvania, United States	For WBC-NABF light heavyweight title
Win	43-7	(United States) Jesse Burnett	UD	15	02-07-1978	Stockton, California, United States	
Loss	42-7	(Argentina) Victor Galindez	UD	15	06-05-1978	Viareggio, Toscana, Italy	For WBA light heavyweight title
Win	42-6	(United States) Mike Rossman	TKO	6 (10)	02-03-1978	New York City, United States	
Win	41-6	(Panama) Fabian Falconette	TKO	2 (10)	12-01-1978	Los Angeles, California, United States	
Win	40-6	(United States) Clarence Geigger	KO	4 (10)	15-12-1977	Stockton, California, United States	
Win	39-6	(United States) Chuck Warfield	KO	4 (10)	27-10-1977	Stockton, California, United States	
Loss	38-6	(Argentina) Victor Galindez	UD	15	17-09-1977	Rome, Lazio, Italy	For WBA light heavyweight title
Win	38-5	(Mexico) Benny Barra	KO	5 (10)	27-07-1977	Las Vegas, Nevada, United States	
Win	37-5	(United States) Manuel Fierro	KO	3 (10)	20-07-1977	Stockton, California, United States	
Win	36-5	(United States) Bobby Lloyd	KO	5 (10)	17-06-1977	Miami Beach, Florida, United States	
Loss	35-5	(United States) Lonnie Bennett	TKO	3 (10)	22-04-1977	Indianapolis, Indiana, United States	
Win	35-4	(United States) Larry Castaneda	KO	8 (10)	07-03-1977	Stockton, California, United States	
Win	34-4	(United States) Danny Brewer	TKO	6 (10)	17-02-1977	Stateline, Nevada, United States	
Win	33-4	(United States) Pete McIntyre	KO	6 (10)	08-12-1976	Stockton, California, United States	
Win	32-4	(United States) Clarence Geigger	TKO	5 (10)	18-11-1976	Stateline, Nevada, United States	
Loss	31-4	(United Kingdom) John Conteh	UD	15	09-10-1976	Copenhagen, Denmark	For WBC light heavyweight title
Win	31-3	(United States) Larry Castaneda	KO	9 (10)	17-07-1976	Stockton, California, United States	
Win	30-3	(United States) Karl Zurheide	TKO	6 (10)	30-06-1976	Stockton, California, United States	
Win	29-3	(United States) David Smith	UD	10	03-05-1976	Stockton, California, United States	
Win	28-3	(United States) Terry Lee	UD	10	12-02-1976	Portland, Oregon, United States	
Win	27-3	(United States) Jesse Burnett	SD	12	24-09-1975	Stockton, California, United States	Won California light heavyweight title
Loss	26-3	(United States) Jesse Burnett	MD	12	31-07-1975	Stockton, California, United States	Lost California light heavyweight title
Win	26-2	(Canada) Gary Summerhays	UD	10	03-07-1975	Gardnerville, Nevada, United States	
Win	25-2	(United States) Mike Quarry	UD	10	14-05-1975	Stockton, California, United States	
Win	24-2	(United States) Lee Mitchell	KO	6 (10)	08-04-1975	Sacramento, California, United States	
Win	23-2	(United States) Terry Lee	TKO	9 (12)	04-03-1975	Sacramento, California, United States	Retained California light heavyweight title
Win	22-2	(United States) Hildo Silva	UD	10	13-11-1974	Stockton, California, United States	
Win	21-2	(United States) Bobby Rascon	KO	6 (10)	11-10-1974	Portland, Oregon, United States	
Win	20-2	(United States) Joe Cokes	MD	12	07-07-1974	Gardnerville, Nevada, United States	
Win	19-2	(United States) Hildo Silva	UD	12	10-05-1974	Stockton, California, United States	Won California light heavyweight title
Win	18-2	(United States) Willie Warren	UD	10	06-03-1974	Reno, Nevada, United States	
Win	17-2	(United States) Andy Kendall	RTD	4 (10)	14-02-1974	Portland, Oregon, United States	
Win	16-2	(United States) Al Bolden	UD	10	06-12-1973	Portland, Oregon, United States	
Win	15-2	(Mexico) Alfonso Gonzalez	KO	2 (10)	01-11-1973	Portland, Oregon, United States	
Win	14-2	(United States) Charlie Brooks	KO	5 (10)	20-09-1973	Stockton, California, United States	
Win	13-2	(United States) Herman Hampton	KO	4 (10)	22-08-1973	Tacoma, Washington, United States	
Win	12-2	(Canada) Ron Wilson	TKO	6 (10)	03-08-1973	Reno, Nevada, United States	
Win	11-2	(United States) Dave Rogers	TKO	5 (10)	06-07-1973	Gardnerville, Nevada, United States	
Win	10-2	(Canada) Ron Wilson	UD	10	09-06-1973	Santa Rosa, California, United States	
Win	9-2	(United States) Hildo Silva	UD	10	21-04-1973	Santa Rosa, California, United States	
Loss	8-2	(United States) Al Bolden	UD	10	15-03-1973	Seattle, Washington, United States	
Win	8-1	(Mexico) Polo Ramirez	KO	7 (8)	08-02-1973	Stockton, California, United States	
Win	7-1	(United States) Van Sahib	KO	1 (10)	11-12-1972	Eugene, Oregon, United States	
Win	6-1	(United States) Herman Hampton	KO	7 (8)	29-11-1972	Stockton, California, United States	
Win	5-1	(United States) Mark Hearn	TKO	2 (6)	06-11-1972	Eugene, Oregon, United States	
Win	4-1	(United States) Henry Tavake	UD	6	24-10-1972	San Carlos, California, United States	
Loss	3-1	(United States) Jesse Burnett	SD	8	01-07-1972	Stockton, California, United States	
Win	3-0	(United States) Cisco Solorio	TKO	6 (8)	16-06-1972	Stockton, California, United States	
Win	2-0	(United States) Herman Hampton	KO	2 (8)	02-06-1972	Carson City, Nevada, United States	
Win	1-0	(United States) Herman Hampton	UD	6	24-04-1972	Stockton, California, United States	
