= Carlos De León =

Puerto Rican boxer (1959–2020)

Personal information
- Nickname: Sugar
- Nationality: Puerto Rican
- Born: May 3, 1959 Trujillo Alto, Puerto Rico
- Died: January 1, 2020 (aged 60) Buffalo, New York
- Height: 6 ft 0 in (1.83 m)
- Weight: Cruiserweight; Light heavyweight

Boxing career
- Stance: Orthodox

Boxing record
- Total fights: 61
- Wins: 52
- Win by KO: 32
- Losses: 8
- Draws: 1

Carlos De León, also known as "Sugar" De Leon, (May 3, 1959 – January 1, 2020) was a Puerto Rican boxer who made history by becoming the first cruiserweight to win the world title twice. Subsequently, he kept breaking his own record for the most times as cruiserweight champion by regaining the title on two further occasions.

== Career ==
De León, a native of Trujillo Alto, Puerto Rico, first won a world title when he faced the WBC world champion Marvin Camel on November 25, 1980, replacing David Pearce the Great Britain boxer on the undercard of Sugar Ray Leonard and Roberto Durán's second fight in New Orleans. De León outpointed Camel over fifteen rounds. In a rematch later, De León knocked out Camel in eight rounds. When his countryman Ossie Ocasio won the WBA world title, De León and Ocasio became the second pair of Puerto Ricans to share world titles in the same division at the same time; Alfredo Escalera and Samuel Serrano had achieved the feat in the 1970s in the junior lightweight division.

=== Taking loss ===
De León lost his title in a shocking upset to former Gerry Cooney victim S. T. Gordon by a knockout in round two in Cleveland in 1982, and won a comeback fight versus former world heavyweight champion Leon Spinks by a knockout in round six in 1983. After that, he and Gordon boxed a rematch in Las Vegas, and De León dropped Gordon once in the first round and once in the twelfth, en route to a unanimous decision win in a history-making bout: De León had now become the first boxer to win the world cruiserweight title twice.

=== Champion again ===
He defended his title against Yaqui López by a knockout in four at San Jose, California, and with decisions over Anthony Davis and Bashiru Ali. The Davis bout took place in Las Vegas and the fight with Ali was in Oakland, California. De León next lost his title in Las Vegas to Alfonzo Ratliff in a decision. Ratliff was in turn beaten by Bernard Benton, who defended against De León on March 22, 1986, once again in Las Vegas. De León joined the likes of Sugar Ray Robinson and Muhammad Ali in becoming one of the few boxers ever to win one division's world championship at least three times, defeating Benton by decision.

=== Once more ===
He made a couple of defenses in Italy and then in 1988, he defended the title against Uruguayan José María Flores Burlón in Atlantic City, New Jersey, winning by twelve rounds in a unanimous decision but then he lost his titles in a unification bout with WBA and IBF world champion Evander Holyfield, by TKO in the eighth round, also in Las Vegas. But Holyfield soon left the division to pursue the world heavyweight championship, and De León was left with an open door to break his own record and win the title for a record fourth time. He went to London, where he beat the WBC's number two ranked contender, Sammy Reeson, by a knockout in the ninth round, breaking his own record and was crowned world cruiserweight champion once again.

=== Holding on ===
Carlos held on to the title for two years until finally losing it to Massimiliano Duran in Italy in an eleventh-round disqualification. He gained the title by his aforementioned win over Sammy Reeson. He made a defense by drawing with Johnny Nelson before the loss to Massimilano Duran mentioned earlier.

== After boxing ==
During the 1990s, De León ran afoul of the law a number of times, once while he was carrying a rifle. He worked on helping the professional boxing career of his son, prospect Carlos de León Jr.

He died on January 1, 2020, due to a cardiac arrest. He was 60.

== Professional boxing record ==
62 fights	53 wins	8 losses
By knockout	33	5
By decision	20	2
By disqualification	0	1
Draws	1	

No.	Result	Record	Opponent	Type	Round, time	Date	Location	Notes
62	Loss	53–8–1	Brian Nielsen	TKO	3 (8)	Nov 24, 1995	Randers, Denmark	
61	Loss	53–7–1	Corrie Sanders	TKO	1 (10), 0:49	Aug 13, 1994	Convention Hall, Atlantic City, New Jersey, U.S.	
60	Win	53–6–1	Bobby Arthurs	MD	10	Feb 17, 1994	Joliet, Illinois, U.S.	
59	Win	52–6–1	Brian Morgan	PTS	8	Jan 14, 1994	Chicago, Illinois, U.S.	
58	Win	51–6–1	Jordan Keepers	TKO	5 (?)	Nov 5, 1993	Gary, Indiana, U.S.	
57	Win	50–6–1	Andre Crowder	KO	1 (8)	Jun 19, 1993	Davenport, Iowa, U.S.	
56	Win	49–6–1	Joey Christjohn	PTS	6	May 15, 1993	Milwaukee, Wisconsin, U.S.	
55	Win	48–6–1	James Wilder	UD	10	Mar 13, 1993	Aurora, Illinois, U.S.	
54	Win	47–6–1	Rocky Bentley	UD	10	Jan 22, 1993	Countryside, Illinois, U.S.	
53	Win	46–6–1	Bruce Johnson	TKO	4 (10)	Jun 27, 1992	Miami, Florida, U.S.	
52	Loss	45–6–1	Massimiliano Duran	DQ	11 (12)	Jul 27, 1990	Capo d'Orlando, Sicilia, Italy	Lost WBC cruiserweight title; De León disqualified for hitting after the bell
51	Draw	45–5–1	Johnny Nelson	SD	12	Jan 27, 1990	City Hall, Sheffield, England	Retained WBC cruiserweight title
50	Win	45–5	Sammy Reeson	TKO	9 (12), 2:04	May 17, 1989	London Arena, London, England	Won vacant WBC cruiserweight title
49	Loss	44–5	Evander Holyfield	TKO	8 (12), 1:08	Apr 9, 1988	Caesars Palace, Paradise, Nevada, U.S.	Lost WBC cruiserweight title; For WBA and IBF cruiserweight titles
48	Win	44–4	Jose Maria Flores Burlon	UD	12	Jan 22, 1988	Atlantic City, New Jersey, U.S.	Retained WBC cruiserweight title
47	Win	43–4	Larry Phelps	KO	1 (10), 1:33	Aug 1, 1987	Las Vegas, Nevada, U.S.	
46	Win	42–4	Angelo Rottoli	TKO	5 (12)	Feb 21, 1987	Bergamo, Lombardia, Italy	Retained WBC and The Ring cruiserweight titles
45	Win	41–4	Michael Greer	TKO	8 (12), 1:43	Aug 10, 1986	Giardini Naxos, Sicilia, Italy	Retained WBC and The Ring cruiserweight titles
44	Win	40–4	Bernard Benton	MD	12	Mar 22, 1986	Las Vegas, Nevada, U.S.	Won WBC and The Ring cruiserweight titles
43	Loss	39–4	Alfonzo Ratliff	SD	12	Jun 6, 1985	Las Vegas, Nevada, U.S.	Lost WBC and The Ring cruiserweight titles
42	Win	39–3	Dorcey Gaymon	TKO	9 (10)	Jan 12, 1985	Oranjestad, Aruba	
41	Win	38–3	Bash Ali	UD	12	Jun 2, 1984	Oakland, California, U.S.	Retained WBC and The Ring cruiserweight titles
40	Win	37–3	Anthony Davis	UD	12	Mar 9, 1984	Las Vegas, Nevada, U.S.	Retained WBC and The Ring cruiserweight titles
39	Win	36–3	Yaqui Lopez	TKO	4 (12), 2:51	Sep 21, 1983	San Jose, California, U.S.	Retained WBC cruiserweight title
38	Win	35–3	S.T. Gordon	UD	12	Jul 17, 1983	Las Vegas, Nevada, U.S.	Won WBC cruiserweight title
37	Win	34–3	Leon Spinks	RTD	6 (10), 3:00	Mar 6, 1983	Atlantic City, New Jersey, U.S.	
36	Win	33–3	Ivy Brown	PTS	10	Nov 26, 1982	Houston, Texas, U.S.	
35	Loss	32–3	S.T. Gordon	TKO	2 (15), 2:51	Jun 27, 1982	Highland Heights, Ohio, U.S.	Lost WBC cruiserweight title
34	Win	32–2	Marvin Camel	TKO	8 (15)	Feb 24, 1982	Atlantic City, New Jersey, U.S.	Retained WBC cruiserweight title
33	Win	31–2	Greg Payne	TKO	3 (10), 1:38	Dec 12, 1981	Houston, Texas, U.S.	
32	Win	30–2	Marvin Camel	MD	15	Nov 25, 1980	New Orleans, Louisiana, U.S.	Won WBC cruiserweight title
31	Win	29–2	Mario Rosa	PTS	8	Jun 28, 1980	San Juan, Puerto Rico	
30	Win	28–2	Waldemar Paulino	KO	1 (12), 0:28	Apr 25, 1980	Anaheim, California, U.S.	
29	Win	27–2	Christy Elliott	TKO	4 (12), 1:15	Sep 25, 1979	Miami Beach, Florida, U.S	
28	Win	26–2	Willie McIntyre	TKO	1 (10)	Aug 25, 1979	San Juan, Puerto Rico	
27	Win	25–2	Manny Freitas	TKO	1 (?), 1:25	Apr 8, 1979	Las Vegas, Nevada, U.S.	
26	Win	24–2	Bonifacio Avila	TKO	2 (10), 2:46	Jan 27, 1979	San Juan, Puerto Rico	
25	Win	23–2	Wendell Joseph	PTS	10	Nov 18, 1978	Saint Thomas, U.S. Virgin Islands, U.S.	
24	Win	22–2	Rennie Pinder	TKO	3 (10)	Sep 26, 1978	Miami Beach, Florida, U.S.	
23	Win	21–2	Roy Harry	KO	1 (10), 2:14	Sep 8, 1978	Saint Thomas, U.S. Virgin Islands, U.S.	
22	Win	20–2	Tyrone Freeman	TKO	3 (10), 2:28	Apr 8, 1978	Bayamón, Puerto Rico	
21	Win	19–2	Jesse Lara	TKO	2 (?), 1:13	Mar 25, 1978	Las Vegas, Nevada, U.S	
20	Win	18–2	Ray Bryant	TKO	5 (10)	Jan 28, 1978	San Juan, Puerto Rico	
19	Win	17–2	Eddie Davis	TKO	5 (10)	Nov 8, 1977	Orlando, Florida, U.S.	
18	Win	16–2	Battling Douglas	TKO	5 (10), 2:12	Oct 14, 1977	Saint Thomas, U.S. Virgin Islands, U.S.	
17	Loss	15–2	Ray Hammond	PTS	8	Sep 10, 1977	San Juan, Puerto Rico	
16	Win	15–1	Mustapha Ali	UD	10	Jul 29, 1977	Saint Thomas, U.S. Virgin Islands, U.S	
15	Win	14–1	Eddie Davis	TKO	3 (?)	Jun 25, 1977	Bayamón, Puerto Rico	
14	Win	13–1	Antonio Colon	TKO	6 (?)	Feb 12, 1977	Bayamón, Puerto Rico	
13	Win	12–1	Carlos Soto	PTS	8	Oct 11, 1976	San Juan, Puerto Rico	
12	Win	11–1	Astor Agosto	PTS	8	Aug 16, 1976	San Juan, Puerto Rico	
11	Win	10–1	Dario de Jesus	PTS	8	Jul 19, 1976	San Juan, Puerto Rico	
10	Win	9–1	Carlos Soto	PTS	8	Apr 5, 1976	San Juan, Puerto Rico	
9	Loss	8–1	Roberto Colon	PTS	4	Feb 15, 1976	Ponce, Puerto Rico	
8	Win	8–0	Larry Adkins	PTS	8	Sep 15, 1975	Port-of-Spain, Trinidad and Tobago	
7	Win	7–0	James Jackson	TKO	3 (?)	Nov 11, 1975	Port-of-Spain, Trinidad and Tobago	
6	Win	6–0	Cubby Jackson	TKO	4 (?)	May 17, 1975	Philipsburg, Sint Maarten, Netherlands Antilles, Netherlands	
5	Win	5–0	Kid Gavilan	TKO	6 (?)	Apr 5, 1975	Philipsburg, Sint Maarten, Netherlands Antilles, Netherlands	
4	Win	4–0	Tripodi Guadalupe	TKO	5 (?)	Mar 17, 1975	Philipsburg, Sint Maarten, Netherlands Antilles, Netherlands	
3	Win	3–0	Vernon Laws	TKO	3 (?)	Nov 2, 1974	Saint Croix, U.S. Virgin Islands, U.S.	
2	Win	2–0	Jesse Torres	TKO	2 (?)	Oct 19, 1974	Saint Croix, U.S. Virgin Islands, U.S.	
1	Win	1–0	Roy Harris	TKO	4 (?)	Aug 3, 1974	Saint Thomas, U.S. Virgin Islands, U.S.	

== See also ==
- List of cruiserweight boxing champions
- List of WBC world champions
- List of Puerto Rican boxing world champions
- List of Puerto Ricans

Sporting positions
World boxing titles
Preceded by Marvin Camel	Lineal Cruiserweight Champion; November 25, 1980 – June 27, 1982	Succeeded by S.T. Gordon
Preceded by Marvin Camel	WBC Cruiserweight Champion; November 25, 1980 – June 27, 1982	Succeeded by S.T. Gordon
Preceded by S.T. Gordon	Lineal Cruiserweight Champion; July 17, 1983 – June 6, 1985	Succeeded by Alfonso Ratliff
Preceded by S.T. Gordon	WBC Cruiserweight Champion; July 17, 1983 – June 6, 1985	Succeeded by Alfonso Ratliff
Inaugural champion	The Ring Cruiserweight Champion; February 3, 1984 – June 6, 1985	Succeeded by Alfonso Ratliff
Preceded by Bernard Benton	Lineal Cruiserweight Champion; March 22, 1986 – April 9, 1988	Succeeded by Evander Holyfield
Preceded by Bernard Benton	WBC Cruiserweight Champion; March 22, 1986 – April 9, 1988	Succeeded by Evander Holyfield
Preceded by Bernard Benton	The Ring Cruiserweight Champion; March 22, 1986 – March 30, 1987; Recognition of division stopped	Succeeded by Jean Marc Mormeck; Division reintroduced
Vacant Title last held by Evander Holyfield	WBC Cruiserweight Champion; May 17, 1989 – July 27, 1990	Succeeded by Massimiliano Duran
