= Schisò Castle =

Coordinates: 37.823574°N 15.271838°E

Schisò Castle (in Italian Castello di Schisò) is a 16th-century fortress on Cape Schisò in Giardini Naxos, Sicily, Italy.

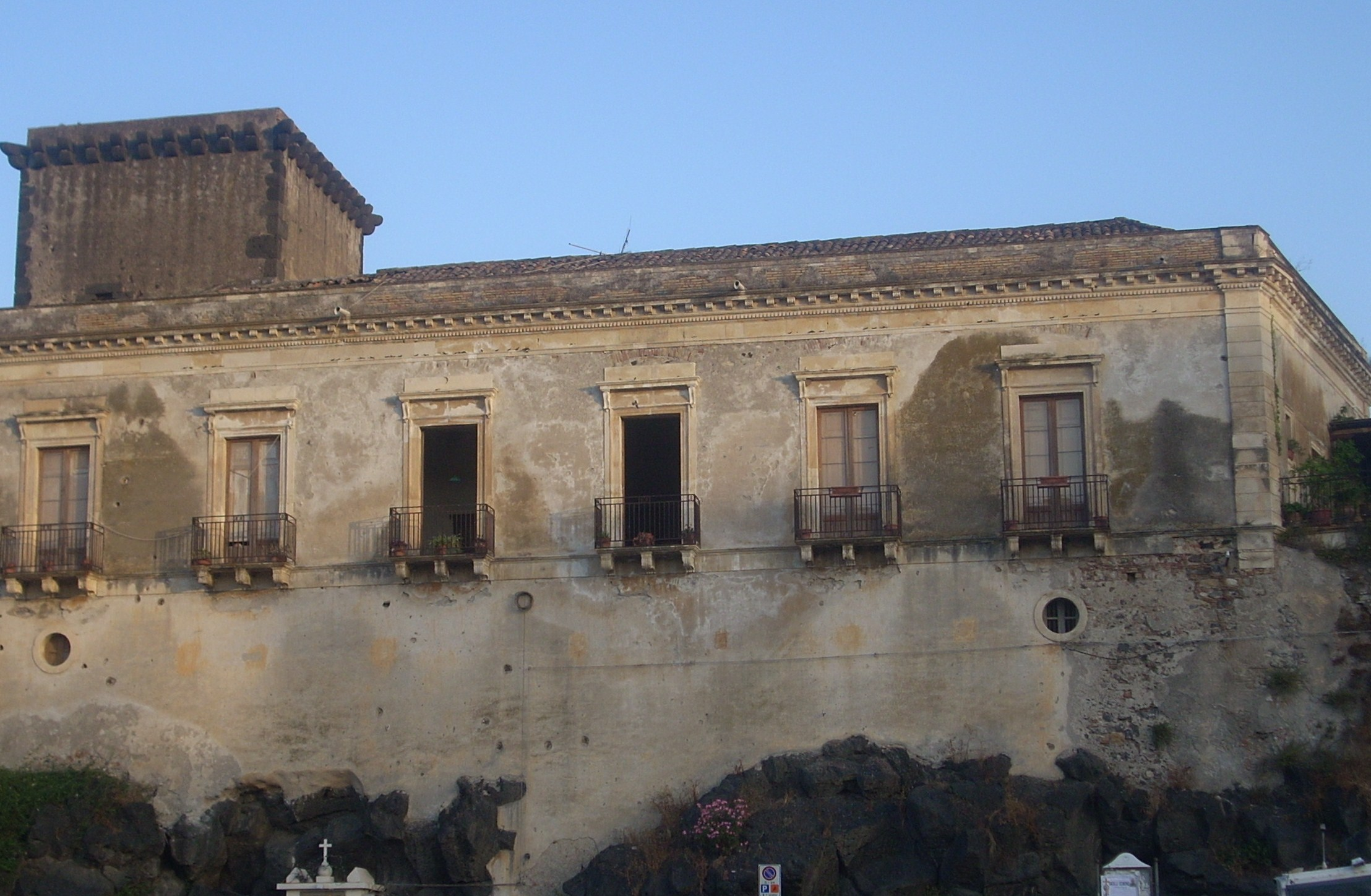
Schisò Castle. The observation tower was added in the 16th century when the castle was rebuilt from an earlier, medieval structure

== History ==
Schisò Castle, which overlooks the bay of Giardini Naxos, was originally constructed in the 13th and 14th centuries. It was rebuilt in the 16th century, with a military observation tower added which served to patrol Cape Schisò and the bay against raids by Barbary pirates who were led by the Turkish corsair Barbarossa Kheir-ed-Din to plunder the many small coastal fishing villages on the coast south of Port Schisò. Within the castle was a sugarcane processing unit as the production of this crop was a lucrative activity in 16th-century Sicily.

It is built upon a small hill formed by lava rock, and its name Schisò is derived from the Arabic word Al Qusus which means bust or chest. It was renovated in the late 19th century, with the addition of balconies which line the facade. Its first owner in the 16th century was Don Cesare Statella, a nobleman from the city of Catania. Subsequent owners included the aristocratic De Spuches family, Giovanni Conti, Lombardo Alonco, and in the early 20th century the castle passed to the family of Paladino who continue to own it up to the present day.

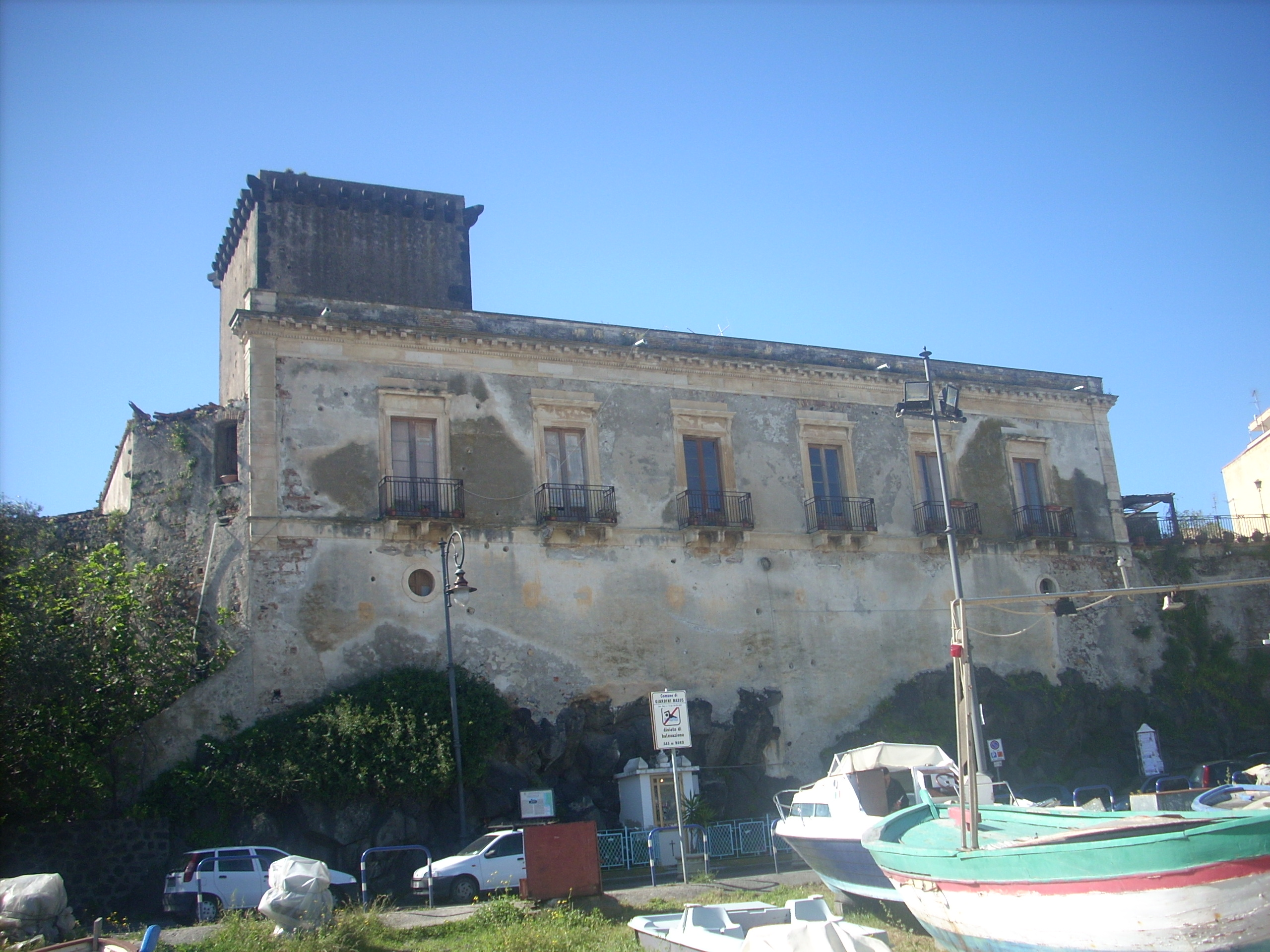
A full view of Schisò Castle.
