= James Tillis =

American boxer

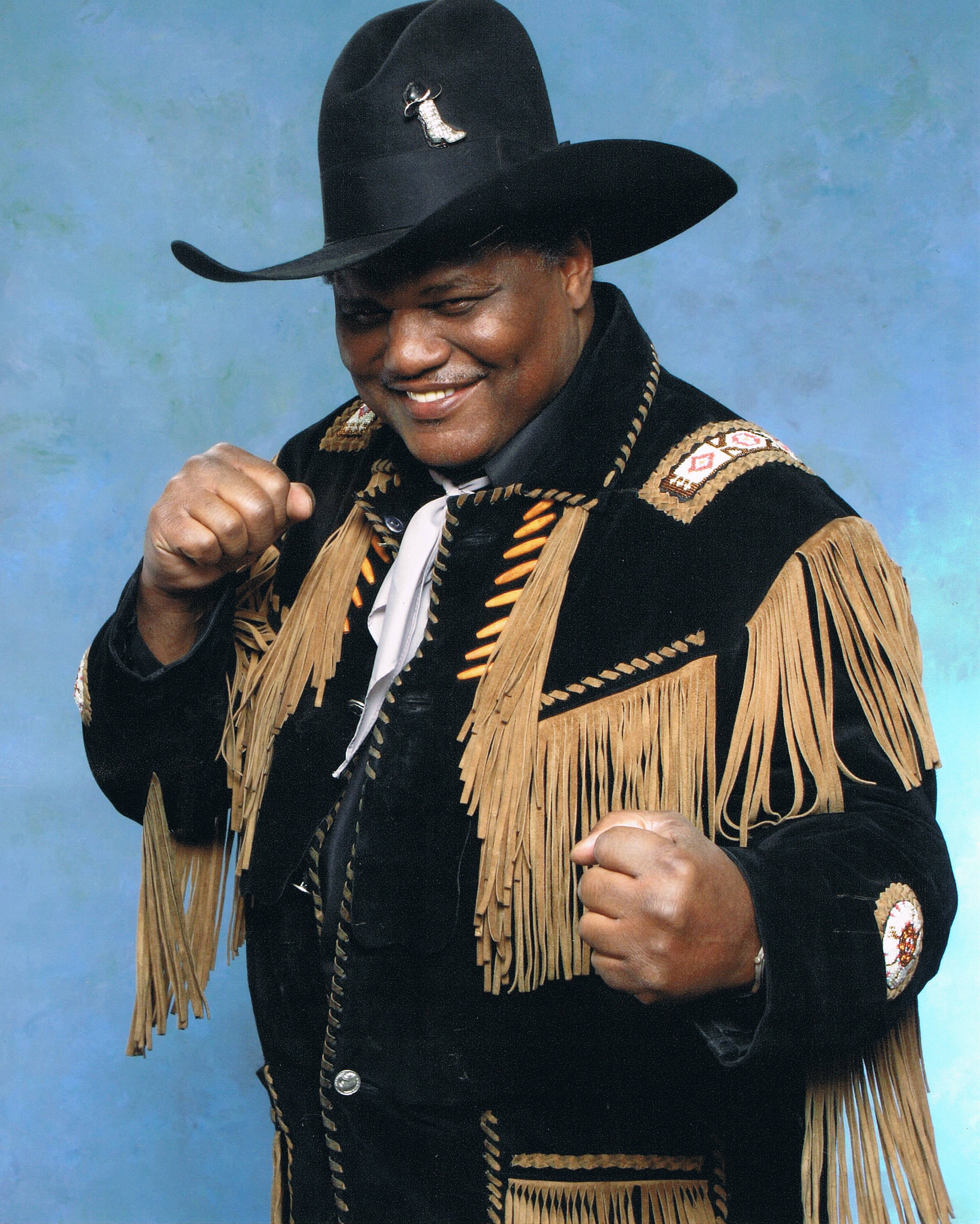
- James "Quick" Tillis - The Fighting Cowboy

Personal information
- Nicknames: Quick; The Fighting Cowboy
- Born: James Theodore Tillis; July 5, 1957 (age 69) Tulsa, Oklahoma, U.S.
- Height: 6 ft 1 in (1.85 m)
- Weight: Heavyweight
- Website: jamesquicktillis.com

Boxing career
- Reach: 80 in (203 cm)
- Stance: Orthodox

Boxing record
- Total fights: 65
- Wins: 42
- Win by KO: 31
- Losses: 22
- Draws: 1
- No contests: 1

James Tillis (born July 5, 1957) is an American former professional boxer and actor. Known as "Quick", he was famous for his remarkable fast hand speed for a man of his size and build. A natural southpaw, Tillis changed to orthodox midway in his amateur career. His left remained the stronger hand and for that reason, he had a powerful jab and left hook, together with the ability to switch stances while fighting. Tillis challenged for the WBA world heavyweight title in 1981, but was defeated in a fifteen-round unanimous decision fight against Mike Weaver. Tillis was the first man to go the distance with Mike Tyson in 1986, breaking his knockout-streak and giving him a close fight, nearly a draw, with two of three judges scoring the fight 6-to-4. (in the words of Hall of Fame's Gil Clancy, Tillis was "one punch" away from victory.) He holds notable wins over Ron Stander by TKO in the 7th round in 1980, and the hard punching Earnie Shavers by ten-round decision in 1982.

== Early years ==
A native of Tulsa, Oklahoma, he was the firstborn son of James Tillis and wife Rose. Tillis attended Mclain High School and grew up in a very religious southern family, with an alcoholic father and a deeply religious mother. His mother would later join First Baptist Mohawk Church under the leadership of Pastor Clint Simmons. He dreamed about being a professional prize fighter and was given the nickname "Quick" by his first cousin Keith Reed.

== Amateur career ==
"Quick" was influenced to begin training to become a boxer after he listened to the 1964 bout between Muhammad Ali and Sonny Liston on the radio. He enlisted the help of noted trainer Ed Duncan, by becoming involved in the sport at the O'Brien Park recreation center in north Tulsa. Tillis' amateur record of 92–8 led to his being considered for the United States Olympic team. Due to an illness, he was unable to compete in the Olympic trials.

However, his impressive amateur career included three state Golden Gloves and four state AAU titles. He lost to future pro opponent Greg Page at the 1976 National Golden Gloves, and to Charles Singleton at the 1978 National Golden Gloves in Albuquerque, New Mexico. At the 1977 USA–USSR Duals in Milwaukee, Wisconsin, he lost on points to the Soviet light heavyweight David Kvachadze. He also managed to beat future pro contender Renaldo Snipes, who he later turned pro with on the same card in 1978.

== Professional career ==
Tillis began his professional boxing career in 1978, with a first-round knockout of Ron Stephany. He won his first 20 fights with 16 knockouts. One of his most impressive early victories was a seventh-round knockout of Ron Stander in 1980. Stander had once challenged Joe Frazier for the world title and was regarded as one of boxing's most durable fighters. Other notable wins included a knockout of the South American champion Domingo D'Elia, and a points win over the sometimes dangerous fringe contender Mike Koranicki. His co-managers were Beau Williford and Gary Bentley.

=== Title fight ===
In 1981, Tillis fought "Hercules" Mike Weaver for the WBA World Heavyweight title. After a strong start, Tillis tired. The fight would become famous for trainer Angelo Dundee imploring Tillis to do something, asking the fighter, "Do you want to be a bum all your life?" Ultimately, Tillis lost a close points decision.

In June 1982, Tillis came off the floor to outpoint the hard-hitting legend Earnie Shavers. He blew that momentum only a few months later, being upset by undefeated contender Pinklon Thomas, who was a late substitute, via an 8th-round knockout loss. In November 1982, Tillis fought former amateur rival Greg Page for the USBA Heavyweight title. He knocked Page down in the 2nd round, but again tired and was the victim of another eighth-round knockout loss. Thomas and Page would go on to win different versions of the world title.

=== Downward spiral ===
Having scored four wins, Tillis challenged future two-time world champion Tim Witherspoon in September 1983, for the vacant North American Boxing Federation title. Tillis was shockingly bombed out in one round, apparently slipping on a wet spot in the ring as Witherspoon hit him. After the fight, Tillis' trainer Angelo Dundee left him and advised him to retire, as he had just suffered his third defeat in thirteen months.

Tillis got a new team and put together four wins in 1984, before challenging Carl Williams in a world title eliminator. Having decked Williams twice in the opening round, Tillis tired and was outpointed. In 1985, under the guidance of trainer Drew Bundini Brown, he fought Joe Frazier's son and top contender Marvis Frazier. In a recurring theme, he had Frazier down in the second round, but again ran out of gas and was outpointed. A few months later, he traveled to South Africa to fight hard-hitting ex-champ Gerrie Coetzee. Tillis lost a unanimous decision, but sent Coetzee to hospital with stitches and missing teeth.

=== Stamina issue ===
After extensive medical examination, Tillis' strange recurrent fatigue midway through fights was found to derive from a severe allergy to the classic fighter's diet of milk and eggs. A doctor provided Tillis with a more suitable diet, in the training for his upcoming fight with Mike Tyson, a red-hot prospect with a 19–0 (19 KOs) record. Tillis appeared to be a new man, as he exchanged with Tyson and gave the future two-time champion a very tough fight. Although ultimately outpointed, he was the first person to take Iron Mike to the distance. Surprisingly, Tillis' heart and will to fight has been questioned quite frequently by boxing analysts, even his co-manager Beau Williford told to the press the night before the fight considering that James was on a three-times-in-a-row losing streak, that his professional career as a boxer would be ended most likely if stopped by Tyson. Trainer Angelo Dundee, who worked with Tillis for the Weaver fight and some subsequent fights, finally gave up his job, he said: "James had no spirit to fight." In the pre-fight interview he told the ESPN staff that he found that spirit. To prove Dundee was wrong, Tillis violated almost all the Dundee "No-Nos" in the Tyson fight:

- Fought out of the squared-up stance, instead of the closed sideway stance.
- Sometimes fought with both hands down.
- Switched to southpaw and back to orthodox.
- Lead with his right hand.
- "Left-hooked with a hooker."
- Got tangled in wild exchanges.

Culminative moment of the fight came at 2:45 of the fourth round, when Tillis charged at Tyson with a leaping left hook, missed, and went off-balanced while pivoting on his left foot. Tyson slipped the punch and promptly switched to orthodox, throwing a leaping left hook of his own that landed right to the Tillis' chin, Tillis went down immediately. Tillis got up quickly at the count of "Two." That was the only knockdown during the entire fight, it cost Tillis a point, and subsequently a round on all the three judges' scorecards, and eventually the fight, which otherwise would have been ended a draw.

Initially, the crowd was rooting for Tyson, but in the later rounds it turned somewhat against Tyson due to him being unable to knock Tillis out, and after the ring announcer Paul LeFlore announced the judges' decision, pronouncing Tyson as the winner by a unanimous decision, the crowd booed wildly when referee Joe Cortez raised Tyson's hand. Being interviewed by the ABC Sports staff, Tyson himself said he just "fought a guy who was up for this fight, in the greatest shape in his life."

The new Tillis was short-lived, however, as he traveled to Australia and lost a decision to veteran Joe Bugner. In 1987, he was upset in eight rounds, as underdog (and regular Tyson sparring partner) Michael Williams came off the floor to stop Tillis. Later in the same year, he was stopped in five rounds on cuts by future champ Frank Bruno in London, and then knocked out in 10 rounds by hard-hitting Johnny DuPlooy in South Africa.

Having failed to secure a rematch with Tyson in 1988, this time for the undisputed heavyweight championship, he made one last attempt at the big time. Tillis was brought in to fight reigning cruiserweight world champion Evander Holyfield, who was making a high-profile move into the heavyweight ranks. Holyfield outpunched Tillis in five one-sided rounds.

Tillis resurfaced in 1991. However, his days even as a journeyman appeared over, as hard-hitting (and future WBO World Champion) Tommy Morrison stopped him in the first round.

=== Semi-retirement ===
Tillis fought on and off until 2001. Although he still was able to outpoint former top-flight amateur Craig Payne, a 39-year-old Tillis was stopped in six rounds by Cliff Couser in 1996.

Tillis fought his last fight in 2001, losing to clubfighter Rob Calloway when he was 44 years old.

== Professional boxing record ==
66 fights	42 wins	22 losses
By knockout	31	11
By decision	11	11
Draws	1	
No contests	1	

No.	Result	Record	Opponent	Type	Round, time	Date	Location	Notes
66	Loss	42–22–1 (1)	Rob Calloway	TKO	9	Apr 13, 2001	Saint Joseph Civic Center, Saint Joseph, Missouri, U.S.	
65	Loss	42–21–1 (1)	Tim Puller	UD	10	Oct 16, 1999	Issaquah, Washington, U.S.	
64	Loss	42–20–1 (1)	Cliff Couser	TKO	6	Aug 30, 1996	Quay Centennial Building, Vancouver, Washington, U.S.	
63	Win	42–19–1 (1)	Craig Payne	UD	8	Jun 21, 1996	Quay Centennial Building, Vancouver, Washington, U.S.	
62	NC	41–19–1 (1)	Will Hinton	NC	3	Dec 7, 1995	Denver, Colorado, U.S.	
61	Loss	41–19–1	Alexander Zolkin	UD	10	Oct 8, 1995	Columbus, Ohio, U.S.	
60	Win	41–18–1	Stan White Johnson	TKO	3	Feb 28, 1992	Union Hall, Countryside, Countryside, Illinois, U.S.	
59	Win	40–18–1	Danny Blake	SD	10	Nov 22, 1991	Peoria, Illinois, U.S.	
58	Loss	39–18–1	Tommy Morrison	TKO	1	Jan 11, 1991	Trump Taj Mahal, Atlantic City, New Jersey, U.S.	
57	Win	39–17–1	Carlton West	TKO	3	Dec 7, 1990	Valley Sports Arena, Roanoke, Virginia, U.S.	
56	Loss	38–17–1	Adilson Rodrigues	UD	10	Mar 20, 1989	Toledo, Parana, Brazil	
55	Loss	38–16–1	Arthel Lawhorne	UD	10	Jan 14, 1989	The Palace of Auburn Hills, Auburn Hills, Michigan, U.S.	
54	Loss	38–15–1	Gary Mason	TKO	5	Nov 30, 1988	Elephant and Castle Shopping Centre, Southwark, England	
53	Loss	38–14–1	Evander Holyfield	RTD	5	Jul 16, 1988	Caesars Tahoe, Stateline, Nevada, U.S.	
52	Win	38–13–1	Rodney Smith	KO	2	Apr 9, 1988	Caesars Palace, Paradise, Nevada, U.S.	
51	Win	37–13–1	Dennis Jackson	KO	5	Oct 16, 1987	Boardwalk Hall, Atlantic City, New Jersey, U.S.	
50	Loss	36–13–1	Johnny DuPlooy	TKO	10	Jun 23, 1987	Ellis Park Indoor Arena, Johannesburg, South Africa	
49	Loss	36–12–1	Frank Bruno	TKO	5	Mar 24, 1987	Wembley Arena, London, England	
48	Win	36–11–1	Ronnie Douglas	TKO	5	Mar 6, 1987	Fort Smith, Arkansas, U.S.	
47	Loss	35–11–1	Mike Williams	TKO	8	Jan 8, 1987	Marriott Brookhollow, Houston, Texas, U.S.	
46	Draw	35–10–1	Avery Rawls	PTS	10	Nov 11, 1986	Showboat Hotel and Casino, Las Vegas, Nevada, U.S.	
45	Win	35–10	Lorenzo Boyd	KO	3	Oct 28, 1986	Station Square, Pittsburgh, Pennsylvania, U.S.	
44	Win	34–10	Eddie Richardson	PTS	10	Oct 18, 1986	Mesquite, Texas, U.S.	
43	Loss	33–10	Joe Bugner	PTS	10	Sep 15, 1986	Sydney Entertainment Centre, Sydney, Australia	
42	Win	33–9	Art Terry	UD	8	Jul 29, 1986	Continental Inn, Lexington, Kentucky, U.S.	
41	Win	32–9	Mark Young	KO	8	Jun 17, 1986	Tulsa, Oklahoma, U.S.	
40	Loss	31–9	Mike Tyson	UD	10	May 3, 1986	Glens Falls Civic Center, Glens Falls, New York, U.S.	
39	Loss	31–8	Tyrell Biggs	UD	8	Jan 25, 1986	Americana Host Farm, Lancaster, Pennsylvania, U.S.	
38	Loss	31–7	Gerrie Coetzee	UD	10	Sep 7, 1985	Ellis Park Stadium, Johannesburg, South Africa	
37	Loss	31–6	Marvis Frazier	UD	10	May 20, 1985	Lawlor Events Center, Reno, Nevada, U.S.	
36	Win	31–5	Bashir Wadud	UD	10	Dec 15, 1984	Genesee Theatre, Waukegan, Illinois, U.S.	
35	Loss	30–5	Carl Williams	UD	10	Oct 23, 1984	Atlantis Hotel and Casino, Atlantic City, New Jersey, U.S.	
34	Win	30–4	Michael Bennett	KO	1	Aug 20, 1984	Miami, Oklahoma, U.S.	
33	Win	29–4	Billy Joe Thomas	KO	3	Jul 10, 1984	Tulsa, Oklahoma, U.S.	
32	Win	28–4	Bobby Crabtree	KO	3	Apr 26, 1984	Excelsior Hotel, Tulsa, Oklahoma, U.S.	
31	Win	27–4	Otis Bates	KO	2	Feb 9, 1984	Tulsa, Oklahoma, U.S.	
30	Loss	26–4	Tim Witherspoon	TKO	1	Sep 23, 1983	Richfield Coliseum, Richfield, Ohio, U.S.	For vacant NABF heavyweight title
29	Win	26–3	Lynwood Jones	KO	4	Jul 9, 1983	DiVinci Manor, Chicago, Illinois, U.S.	
28	Win	25–3	Larry Givens	TKO	2	May 22, 1983	Chicago, Illinois, U.S.	
27	Win	24–3	Grady Daniels	TKO	4	Apr 25, 1983	Congress Americana Hotel, Chicago, Illinois, U.S.	
26	Win	23–3	Leroy Boone	PTS	10	Mar 28, 1983	Congress Americana Hotel, Chicago, Illinois, U.S.	
25	Loss	22–3	Greg Page	TKO	8	Nov 26, 1982	Astrodome, Houston, Texas, U.S.	For USBA heavyweight title
24	Loss	22–2	Pinklon Thomas	TKO	8	Aug 14, 1982	Stouffer's Ballroom, Cleveland, Ohio, U.S.	
23	Win	22–1	Earnie Shavers	UD	10	Jun 11, 1982	Caesars Palace, Paradise, Nevada, U.S.	
22	Win	21–1	Jerry Williams	KO	3	Mar 13, 1982	Sands Hotel, Paradise, Nevada, U.S.	
21	Loss	20–1	Mike Weaver	UD	15	Oct 3, 1981	Rosemont Horizon, Rosemont, Illinois, U.S.	For WBA heavyweight title
20	Win	20–0	Tom Fischer	PTS	10	Mar 9, 1981	Hilton Chicago, Chicago, Illinois, U.S.	
19	Win	19–0	Domingo D'Elia	TKO	4	Nov 13, 1980	International Amphitheatre, Chicago, Illinois, U.S.	
18	Win	18–0	Mike Koranicki	UD	10	Aug 14, 1980	International Amphitheatre, Chicago, Illinois, U.S.	
17	Win	17–0	Eric Sedillo	TKO	4	Jun 12, 1980	Hilton Chicago, Chicago, Illinois, U.S.	
16	Win	16–0	Walter Santemore	UD	10	May 15, 1980	Aragon Ballroom, Chicago, Illinois, U.S.	
15	Win	15–0	Frank Schram	TKO	2	Apr 17, 1980	Aragon Ballroom, Chicago, Illinois, U.S.	
14	Win	14–0	Ron Stander	TKO	7	Mar 3, 1980	International Amphitheatre, Chicago, Illinois, U.S.	
13	Win	13–0	Roy Wallace	UD	10	Feb 1, 1980	International Amphitheatre, Chicago, Illinois, U.S.	
12	Win	12–0	Al Jones	KO	4	Dec 13, 1979	Tulsa Civic Center, Tulsa, Oklahoma, U.S.	
11	Win	11–0	Harry Terrell	KO	1	Nov 20, 1979	Circle Arena, Chicago, Illinois, U.S.	
10	Win	10–0	Bob Whaley	TKO	1	Oct 19, 1979	Chicago, Illinois, U.S.	
9	Win	9–0	Jimmy Cross	TKO	2	Sep 7, 1979	Circle Arena, Chicago, Illinois, U.S.	
8	Win	8–0	Charles Anderson Atlas	TKO	2	Jul 30, 1979	International Amphitheatre, Chicago, Illinois, U.S.	
7	Win	7–0	Henry Porter	TKO	6	Jul 20, 1979	University of Illinois at Chicago, Chicago, Illinois, U.S.	
6	Win	6–0	George Gofarth	TKO	5	Jun 11, 1979	Aragon Ballroom, Chicago, Illinois, U.S.	
5	Win	5–0	Rocky Lane	KO	1	Mar 31, 1979	Chicago, Illinois, U.S.	
4	Win	4–0	Sylvester Wilder	TKO	3	Feb 28, 1979	DePaul University, Chicago, Illinois, U.S.	
3	Win	3–0	Dave Watkins	KO	1	Feb 2, 1979	Aragon Ballroom, Chicago, Illinois, U.S.	
2	Win	2–0	Al Bell	TKO	1	Dec 15, 1978	Aragon Ballroom, Chicago, Illinois, U.S.	
1	Win	1–0	Ron Stephany	KO	1	Nov 18, 1978	Alumni Hall, Chicago, Illinois, U.S.	

== Exhibition boxing record ==
2 fights	0 wins	0 losses
Non-scored	2	

No.	Result	Record	Opponent	Type	Round, time	Date	Location	Notes
2	—N/a	0–0 (2)	(United States) Larry Holmes	—N/a	2	Mar 18, 1990	Jakarta, Indonesia	Non-scored bout
1	—N/a	0–0 (1)	(United States) Mike Tyson	—N/a	4	Nov 12, 1987	DePaul University Alumni Hall, Chicago, Illinois, U.S.	Non-scored bout

== Life after boxing ==
In retirement he wrote an autobiography, Thinkin Big: The Story of James Quick Tillis, the Fightin' Cowboy.

James Tillis received catBOX Entertainment, Inc.’s Lifetime Sports Achievement Award. Tillis, whose fighting prowess named him “quick” and “the fighting cowboy”, was honored with the catBOX Entertainment, Inc.’s Lifetime Sports Achievement Award, before the main event at catBOX’s professional fight card set for February 11, 2010 at Remington Park Casino in Oklahoma City, Oklahoma.

On February 12, 2010, the State of Oklahoma honored one of its favorite sons, James “Quick” Tillis of Tulsa. Gov. Brad Henry signed a declaration making Feb 12 James “Quick” Tillis Day in Oklahoma.

As of 2010 Tillis is living in Tulsa.

His daughter Iciss played basketball at Duke University as a center, and was on the United States National Team for the 2003 Pan American Games. Iciss was later selected in the first round by the Detroit Shock during 2004 WNBA draft. She later played for the New York Liberty in 2006.
