= Vignazza Tower =

- Torre Vignazza
- Giardini Naxos, Sicily, Italy
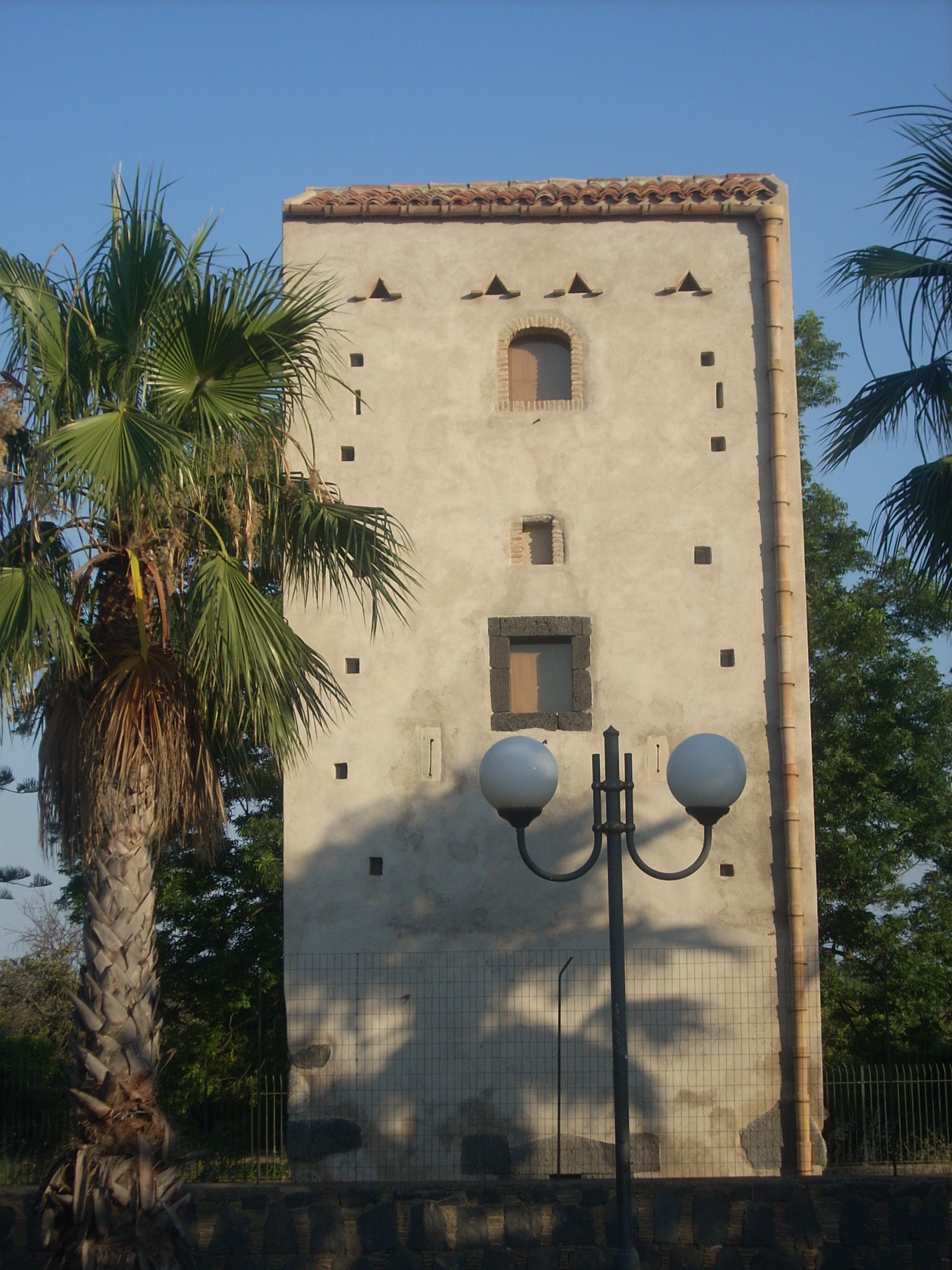
- Facade of Vignazza Tower

Site information
- Type: Coastal watchtower
- Condition: Intact

Location
- Coordinates: 37°49′16.4″N 15°16′6.6″E

Site history
- Built: 1544

Vignazza Tower (Italian: Torre Vignazza) is a 16th-century coastal watchtower in Giardini Naxos, Sicily, southern Italy. Today, the tower is in good condition.

== History ==
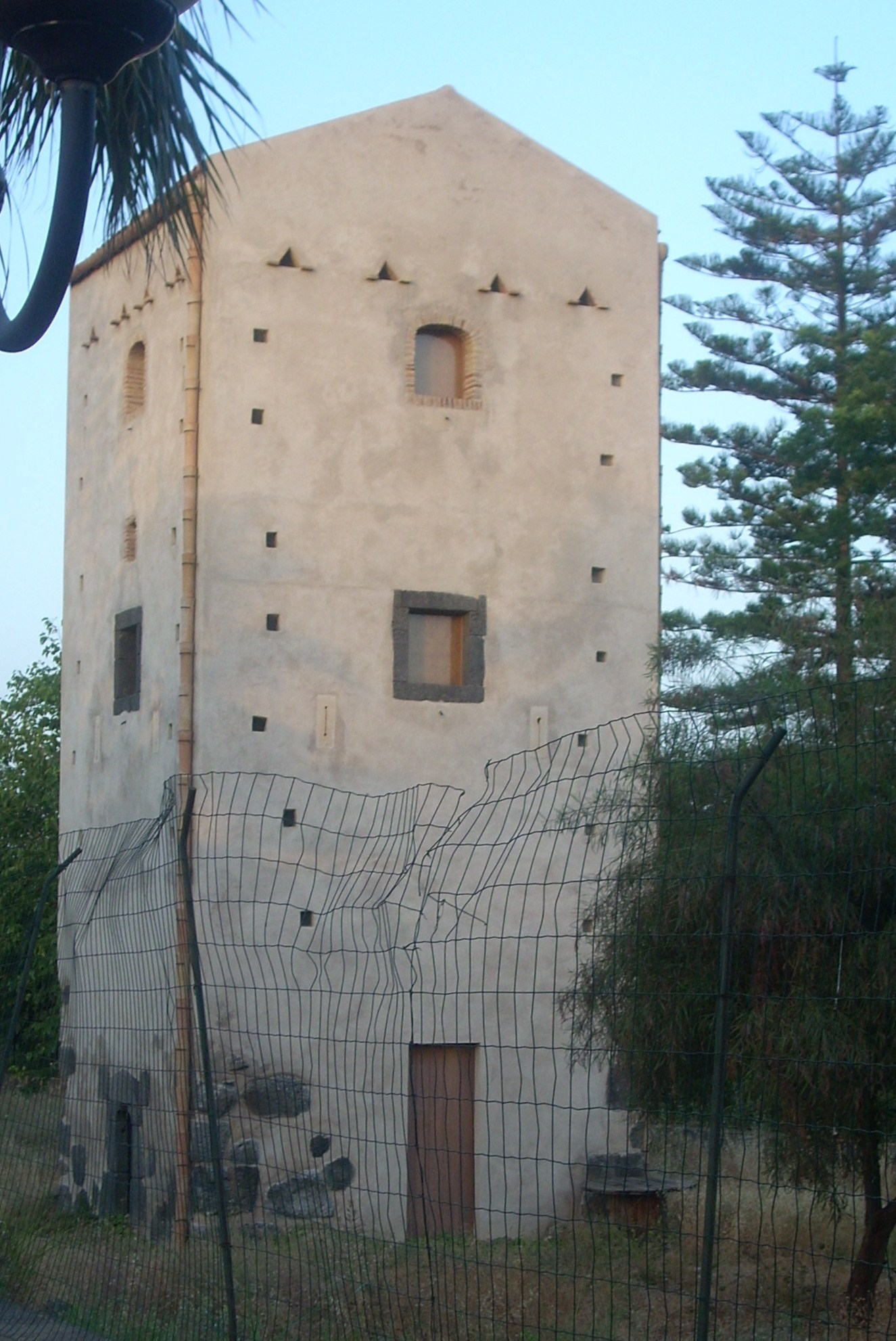
Vignazza Tower as viewed from the south.

Vignazza Tower is a quadrangular structure, three stories high. It was constructed in 1544 to patrol Cape Schisò and the coast south of Port Schisò against the raids of the Barbary corsairs who were led by the Turkish corsair Barbarossa Kheir-ed-Din to attack and plunder the small fishing villages on the coast. When an enemy ship was sighted, the guardian of the watchtower sent out smoke signals to alert the villagers and other watchtowers of the imminent threat. There were many watchtowers such as Vignazza constructed along the Sicilian coast.

Vignazza Tower is located in the Recanati area of Giardini Naxos and is annexed to the archeological park. Its interior is occasionally used for exhibitions and various performances.
