= Giardini Naxos =

Municipality in Sicily, Italy

Giardini Naxos I Jardina (Sicilian)
- Comune
- Comune di Giardini Naxos
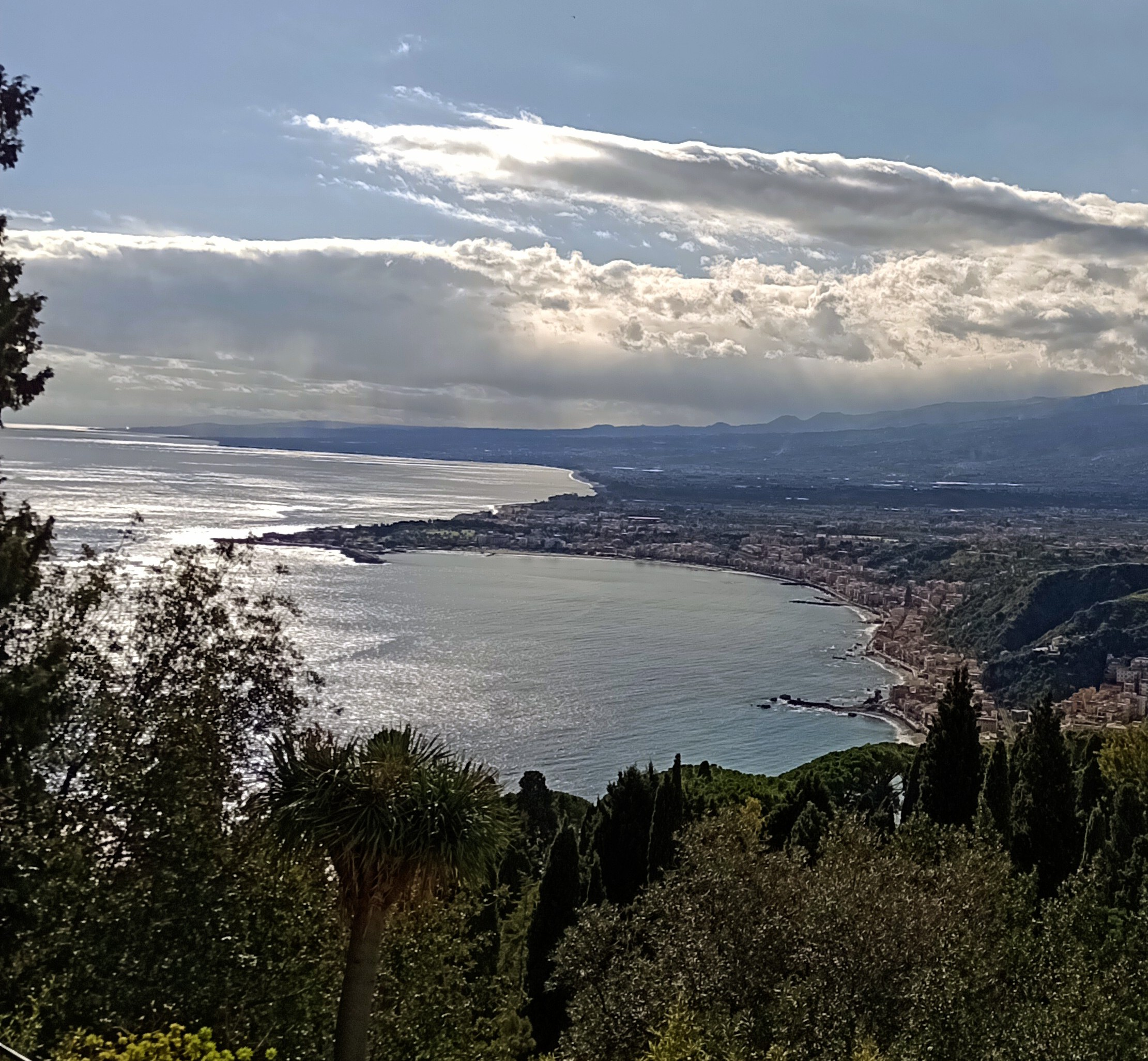
- Giardini Naxos panorama viewed from Taormina
- Interactive map of Giardini Naxos
- Location of Giardini Naxos in Sicily Giardini Naxos (Italy)
- Coordinates: 37.836329°N 15.270690°E
- Country: Italy
- Region: Sicily
- Metropolitan city: Messina (ME)

Government
  - Mayor: Agatino Salvatore Bosco (since 25 May 2026) (Lista Civica)

Area
  - Total: 5 km^{2} (1.9 sq mi)
- Elevation: 8 m (26 ft)

Population (31 August 2017)
  - Total: 9,325
  - Density: 1,900/km^{2} (4,800/sq mi)
- Demonym: Giardinesi
- Time zone: UTC+1 (CET)
  - Summer (DST): UTC+2 (CEST)
- Postal code: 98030
- Dialing code: 0942
- Patron saint: Maria SS. Raccomandata
- Saint day: september 8
- Website: Official website

Giardini Naxos (lit. 'Naxos Gardens'; Sicilian: I Jardina, lit. 'The Gardens') is a comune (municipality) in the Metropolitan City of Messina, on the island of Sicily in southern Italy. It is situated on the coast of the Ionian Sea on a bay which lies between Cape Taormina and Cape Schisò. Since the 1970s it has become a seaside resort, a popular tourist destination, and a cruise ship stop.

== History ==
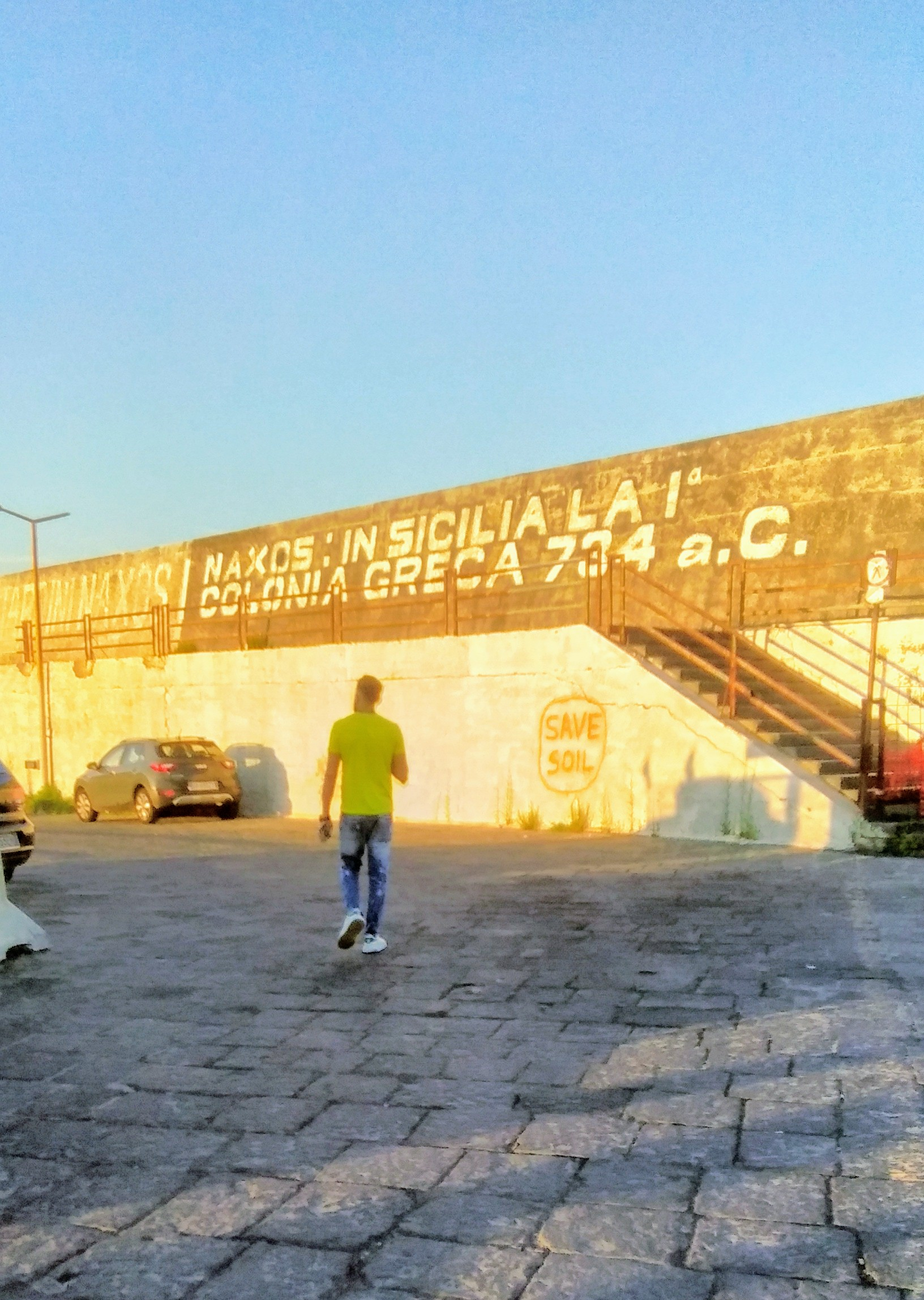
Port of Giardini Naxos with the date of its founding as a Greek colony written on the mole.

Founded by Thucles the Chalcidian in 734 BC in Magna Graecia, Naxos was never a powerful city, but its temple of Apollo Archegetes, protecting deity of all the Greek colonies, gave it prominence in religious affairs. Leontini and Catania were both colonized from here. Hippocrates, tyrant of Gela, captured it in 494 BC. Its opposition to Syracuse ultimately led to its capture and destruction in 403 BC at the hands of Dionysius the tyrant, after it had supported Athens during that city's disastrous Sicilian Expedition. Though the site continued to be inhabited, most activity shifted to neighbouring Tauromenium.

In 1544, following the raids by corsair, Kheir-ed-Din, several military buildings were constructed to protect Cape Schisò from the Barbary pirates who continued to attack and plunder the coastal villages. These were Schisò Castle, which was rebuilt from an earlier 13th-century castle, Schisò fort, and Vignazza Tower. The latter is a quadrangular watchtower which served to patrol the coast south of Port Schisò; if any pirate boats were sighted, the observers inside the tower could alert the villagers and neighbouring watchtowers by sending out smoke signals. Vignazza Tower is located in the Recanati area of Giardini Naxos.

On 20/21 January 2026 Giardini Naxos suffered considerable damage to property and infrastructure from Storm Harry. The Port Zone at Capo Schisò was the worst hit.

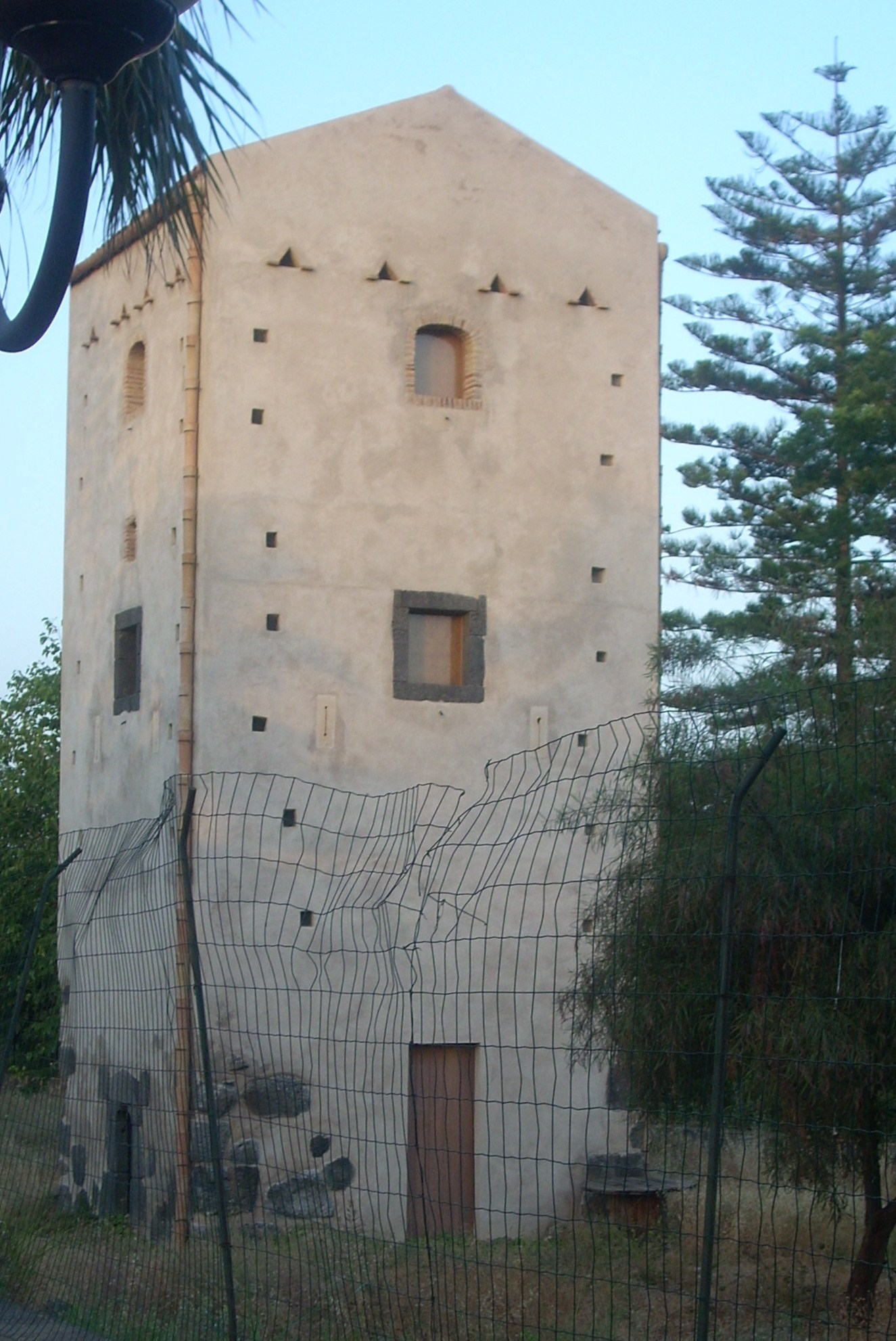
Vignazza Tower, a watchtower built in 1544 to patrol the coast against raids by Barbary pirates

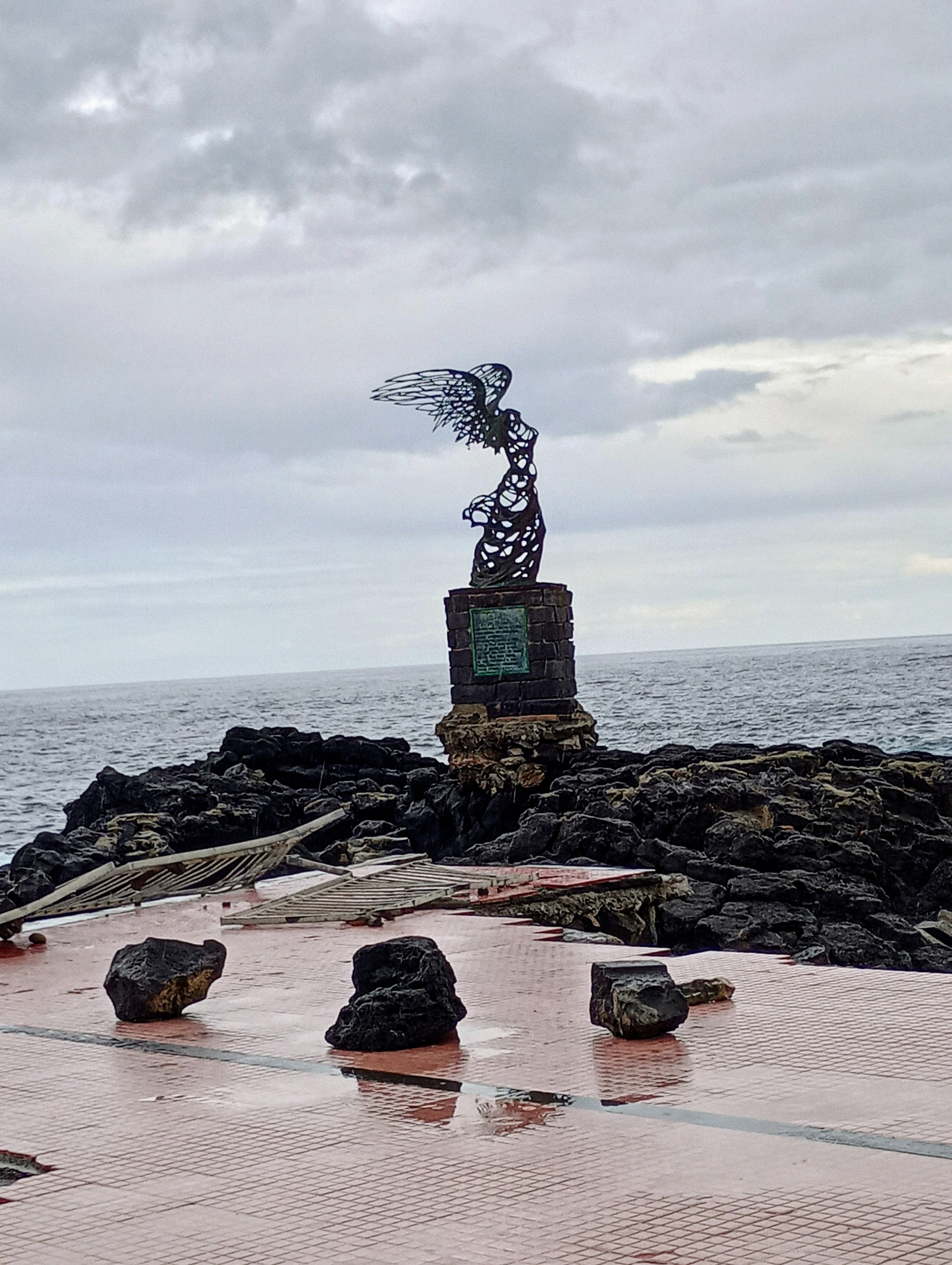
Damage from Storm Harry at Capo Schisò

== Economy ==
Prior to the early 1970s, Giardini Naxos was a quiet fishing village. Now it is a tourist destination, its attractions including beaches, the panoramic view of the bay and surrounding hills, and its small fishing port. A larger port services the cruise ships which arrive regularly. It attracts foreign visitors and Italians alike, many of whom own summer residences in the comune. The seafront is lined with hotels, smaller pensions, pubs, lidos, restaurants and discos. Every Ferragosto its a tradition for people of all ages to spend the night camping and celebrating on the beaches.

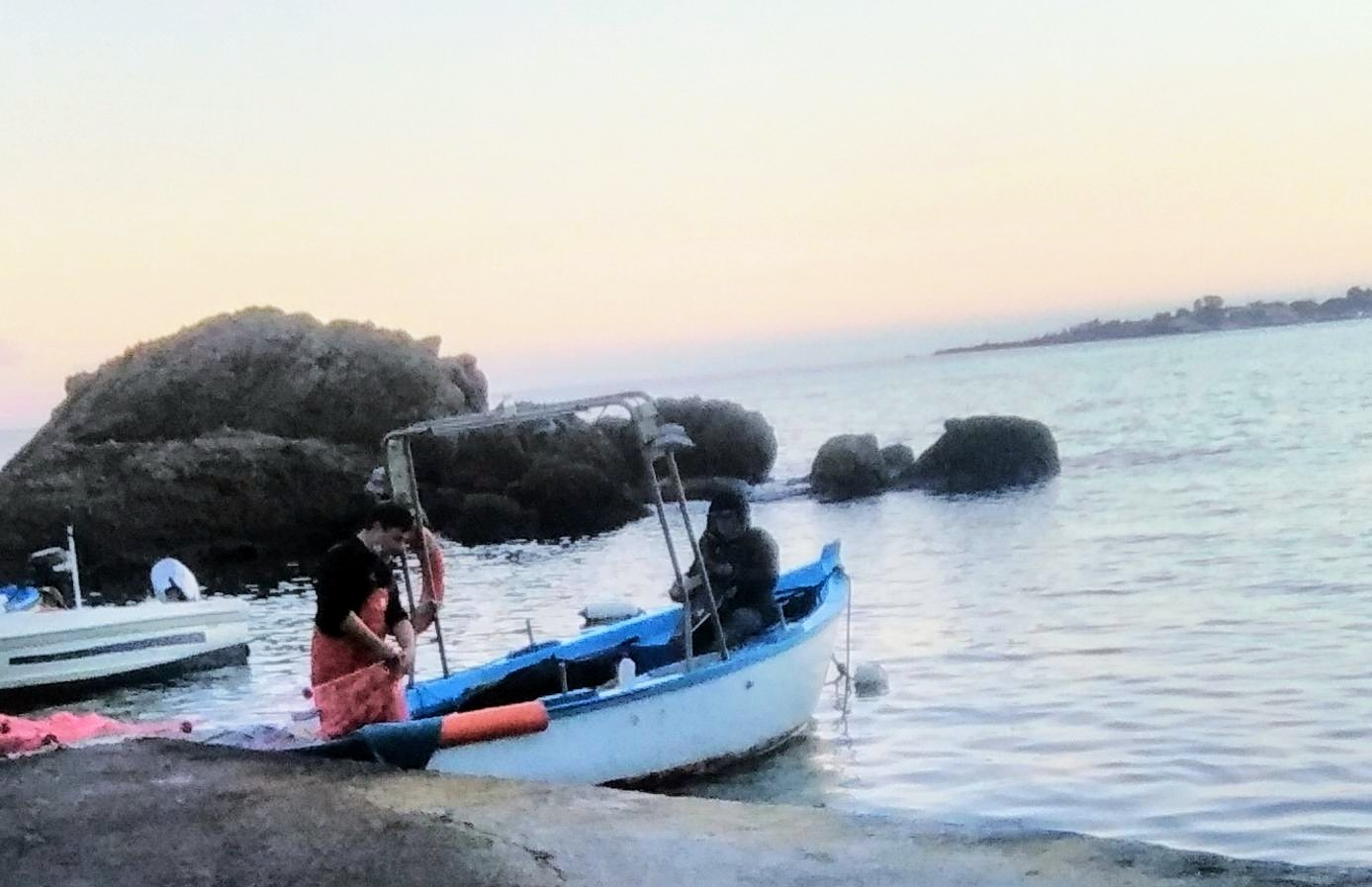
Fishing is still part of the local economy.

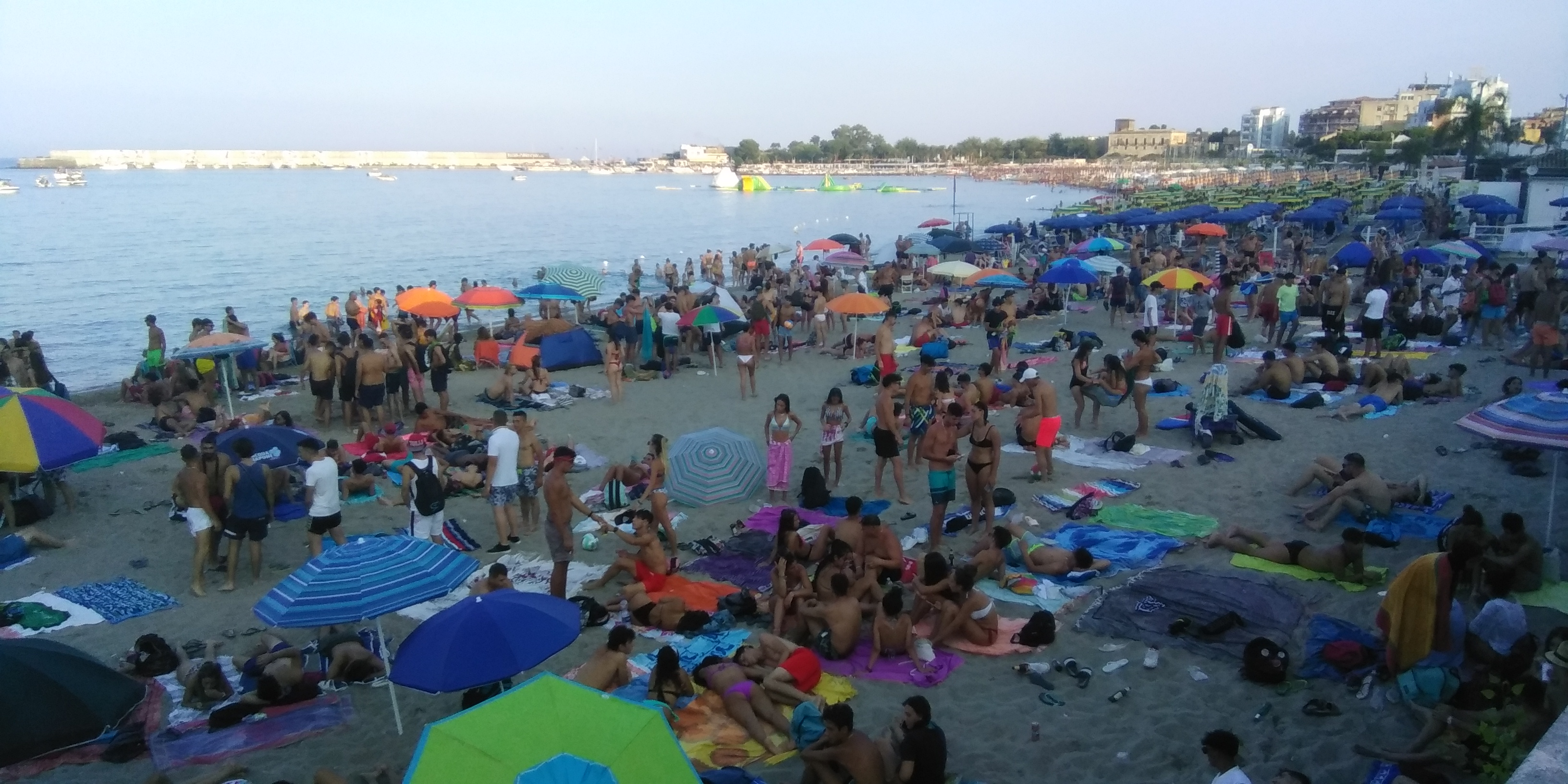
Scene of Ferragosto celebrations on San Pancrazio beach

The town of Taormina is situated in the hills above Giardini Naxos and can be easily accessed by car and bus. Giardini Naxos also has several churches and an archaeological park.

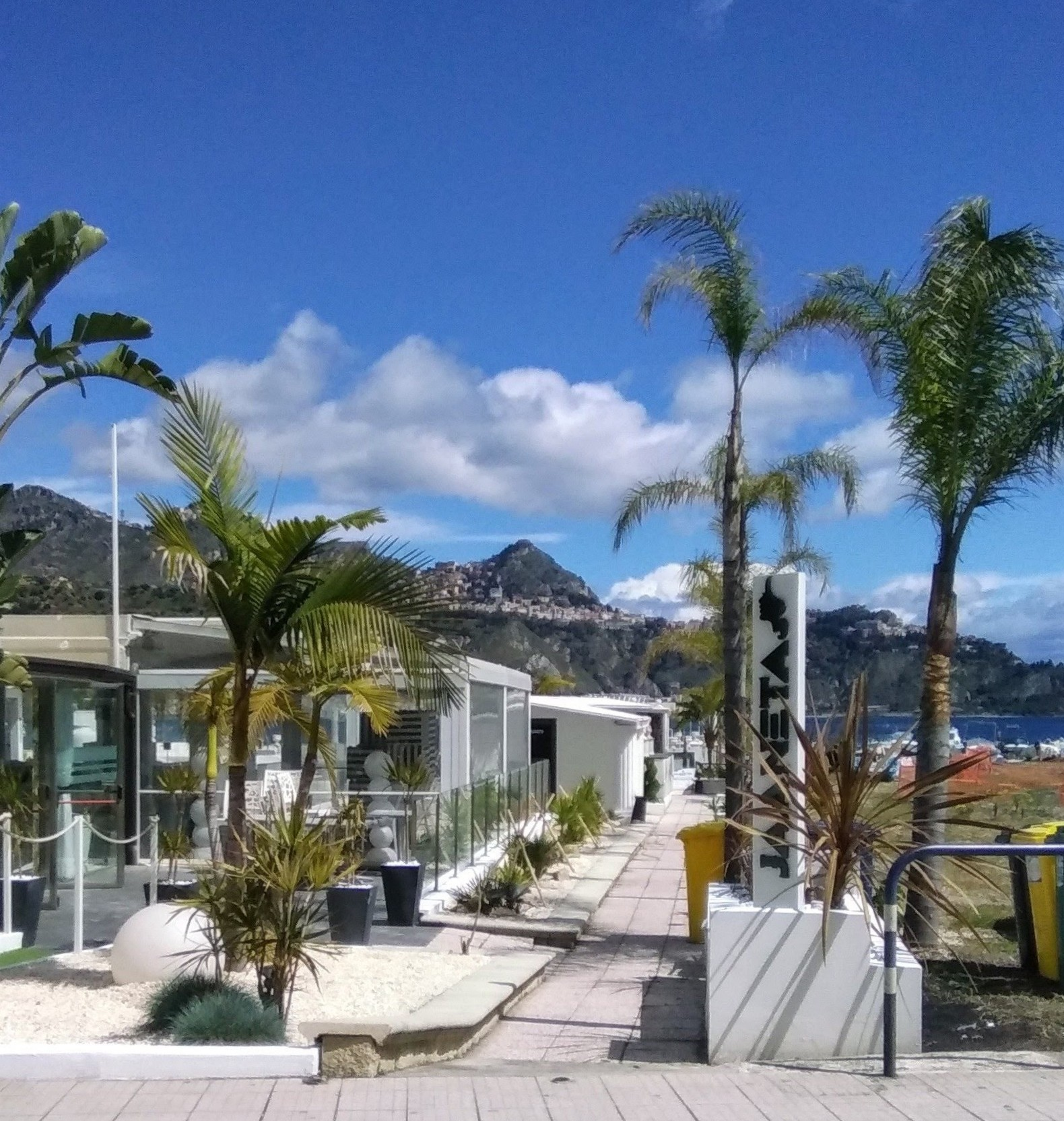
Jaaneta Beach, a popular summer disco club located on Cape Schisó
