= Castello di Terra =

- Trapani, Sicily, Italy
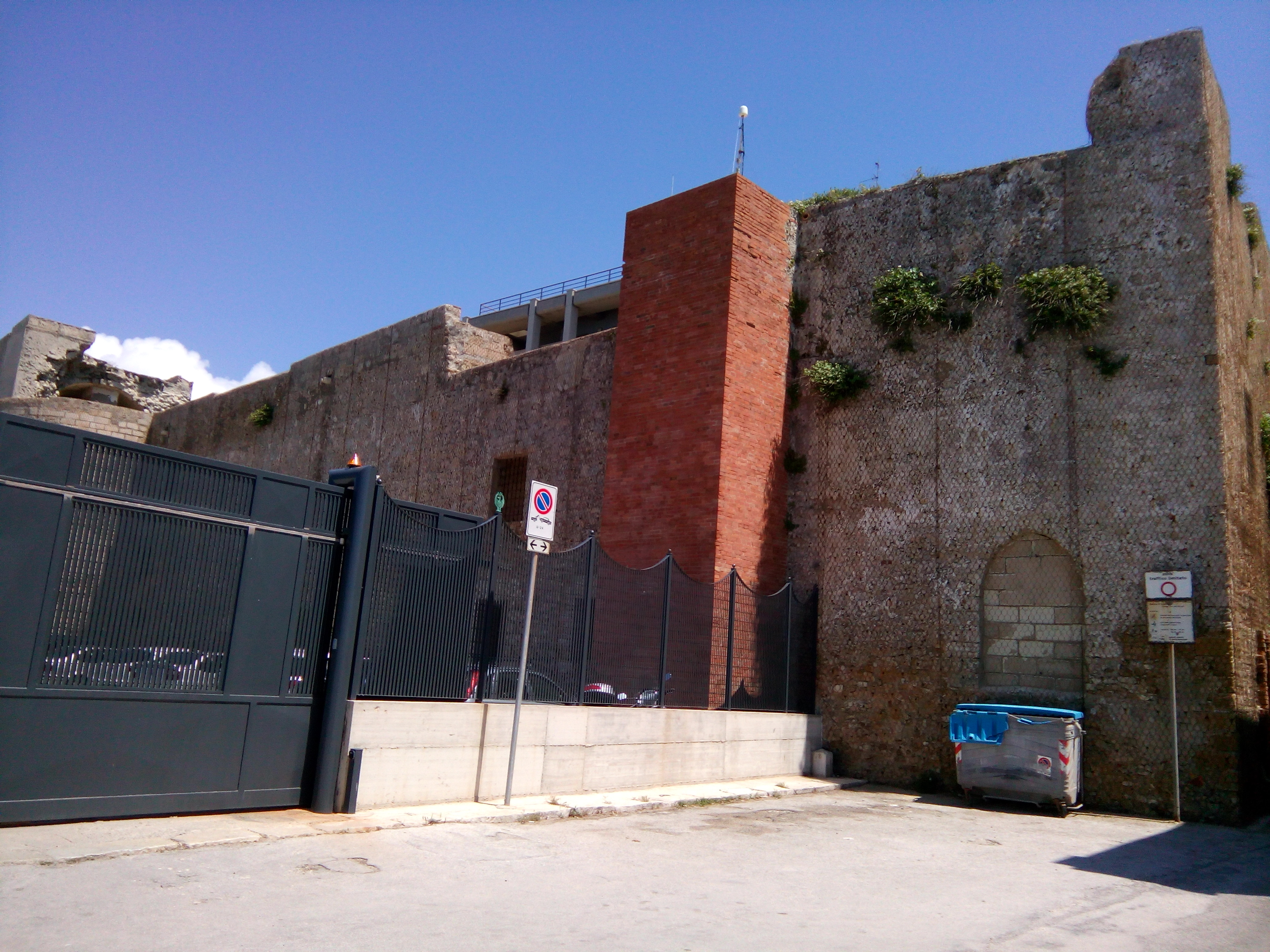

Site information
- Type: castle
- Owner: State property
- Open to the public: No
- Condition: Ruins

Location
- Coordinates: 38°1′8.9″N 12°30′50.9″E

Site history
- Built: c. 1186
- In use: 12th–19th centuries

The Castello di Terra (English: Land Castle) is a castle in Trapani, Sicily. It was originally built in the late 12th century, and was modified over the years until the 19th century. The castle is now in ruins.

== History ==
The Castello di Terra was built in around 1186, and was expanded in the second half of the 14th century and modified again in the 16th and 17th centuries. The castle was originally located at the mouth of the channel linking the Tyrrhenian Sea to the port.

Parts of the castle were converted into barracks in the 19th century. The barracks were demolished in the 1970s and their site is now occupied by a police station.

Archaeological excavations and a partial restoration were carried out at the castle in 1992 and 1994.

== Layout ==
The castle originally had a quadrilateral shape, with semi-circular towers along its curtain walls and rectangular towers at the corners. Today, only the northwestern face of the castle is still intact.
