= Senate of Trapani =

Former Senator's Palace in Trapani (Sicily)

Senate of Trapani Illustrissimo Senato Regio Consigliere

Type
- Type: unicameral house

History
- Established: 14th century
- Disbanded: 18th century

Meeting place
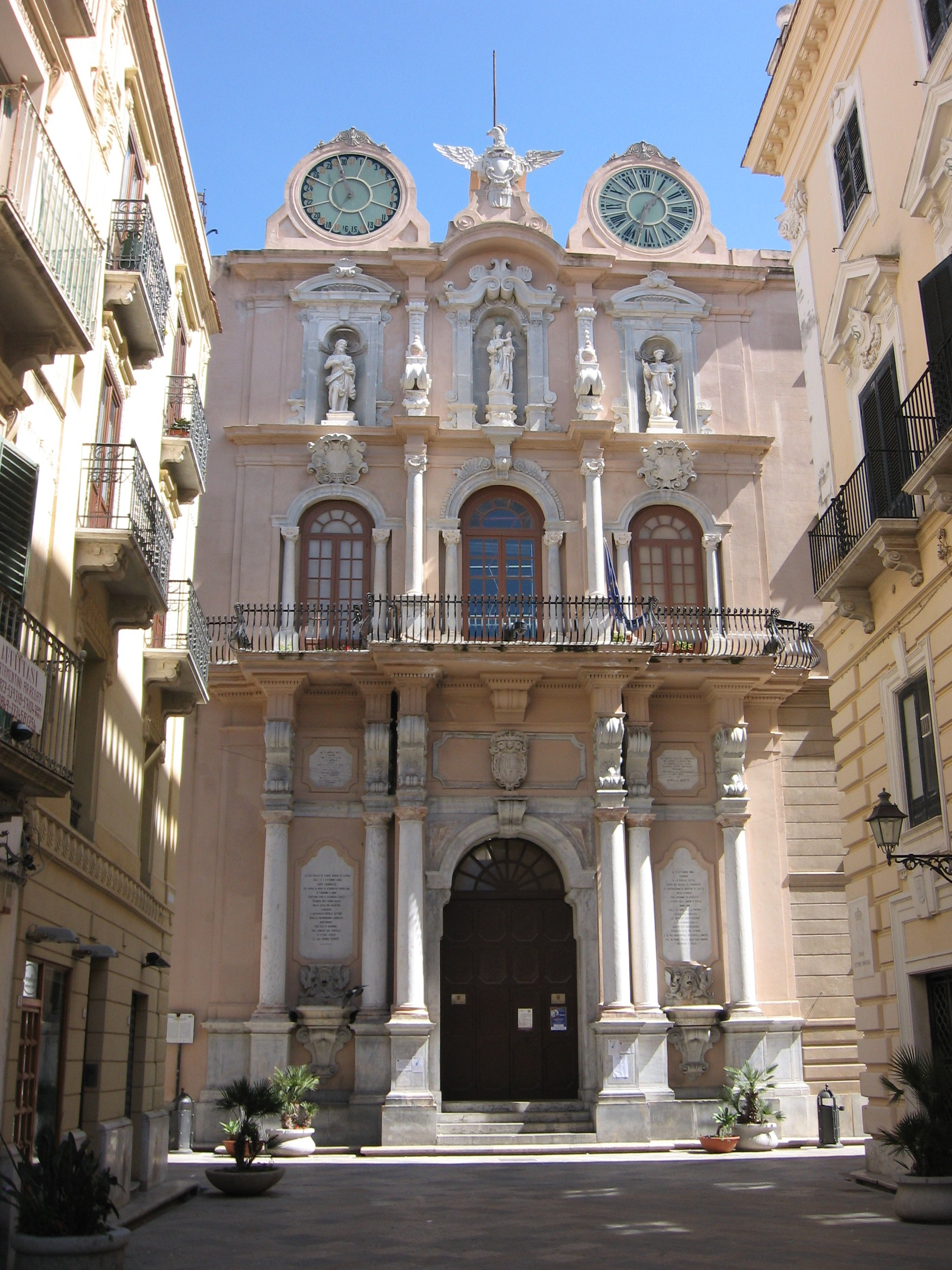
- Palazzo Cavarretta, Trapani, Sicily, Italy

The Senate of Trapani was a medieval municipal institution endowed with judicial and executive powers, symbolizing the privileges enjoyed by the city during the Kingdom of Sicily. Members of local nobility and patriciate occupied seats in the city Senate, wielding hereditary influence over political, administrative, and economic affairs, and nominating candidates for the highest municipal offices.

== History ==
Already in 1195, The Holy Roman Emperor Henry VI decreed that the Capitano Giustiziere (Chief Justice) of Trapani should hold the same rank as the Strategos of Messina.

During medieval and early modern periods, Trapani was among the five most important cities of the Kingdom of Sicily. Alongside Trapani itself, the other cities—Messina, Syracuse, Catania, and Palermo—had civic senates established during the Aragonese domination.

Trapani was one of the four cities never alienated from the royal domain (initially, Syracuse had been the seat of the queen's court). It occupied the fifth place in the royal (demanial) estate division of the Sicilian Parliament (fourth, before Syracuse rejoined). For centuries, the city hosted a municipal magistrate known as the Illustrissimo Senato Regio Consigliere. The Senate consisted of four patricians, known as giurati.

Benigno da Santa Caterina records that Emperor Charles V, upon landing in Trapani in 1535, entered the Temple of Saint Augustine and swore—before all other cities of the kingdom—to uphold the privileges granted to Trapani by his royal predecessors. Consequently, the Senate added the following words to its city seal surrounding Trapani's coat of arms:

"Drepanum Civitas Invictissima, in qua Caesar primum iuravit"

(“Trapani, Most Invincible City, in which Caesar first swore.”)

Charles V further confirmed all privileges previously granted by Alfonso the Magnanimous and Ferdinand the Catholic, including the right of Trapani's Senate to confer academic degrees in theology, mathematics, medicine, physics, law, and fine arts.

On November 12, 1589, King Philip II of Spain granted Trapani the privilege of being designated a city (città), rather than a mere town (terra). The giurati became known as counselors of the Sacro Regio Consiglio (Sacred Royal Council). The Senate was thus the city's supreme magistrature, and the giurati were assisted by counselors. In 1643, the giurati were awarded the title of senator, a distinction later confirmed by Charles II of Spain in 1665.

The last Senate remained active until 1759.

== Offices and functions ==
The offices appointed by the Senate were as follows:

- Captain of Justice (Capitano di giustizia): The highest-ranking magistrate, also known as giustiziere or giustiziario. He was elected annually by the Senate and represented political authority. Established during Norman rule, from 1443 onwards—by privilege granted by Alfonso V the Magnanimous—he was part of the Royal Council and held the first seat within the Senate chamber. He was responsible for administering criminal justice, serving as head of the Captain’s Court (Corte capitaniate), which included five magistrates. His guard consisted of 18 halberdiers.
- Mayor (Sindaco): Elected every three years, he served as the advocate for the people, intervening and acting on their behalf.
- Prefect (Prefetto): Known also as bajolo since Norman rule, he administered civil justice alongside three judges, holding office for one year.
- Senators (Giurati): for the subsequent year: Elected annually to ensure continuity.
- Civil Judges: Responsible for handling civil cases.

The senators also held authority to resolve civil disputes, manage food supplies (annona), oversee storage and distribution of food provisions, maintain public roads and street lighting, and were even responsible for procuring snow. The Senate members appointed additional officials including the assessor, notary, treasurer, secretary, architect, chapel master (maestro di cappella), charity officers, and the Lenten preacher. Many Senate members also participated in the Brotherhood of Charity of the Holy Cross (Confraternita della Carità della Santa Croce).

Senators (giurati) wore short Spanish-style robes with white embroidered sleeves, and on days of mourning, long robes with a cloak (tabarro). During official ceremonies, Senate processions consisted exclusively of mounted participants: first came the drummers, then two trumpeters, followed by kettle-drum players, four constables and the chief constable bearing the standard. Behind them came the Senate’s carriage, drawn by four horses, followed by the carriage carrying the mace-bearer, and finally the carriages of the nobles concluding the procession.

== Headquarters ==
From its inception, the Senatorial Palace (Palazzo Senatorio) was situated next to the Clock Tower, overlooking Porta Oscura, opposite Rua Grande (today Corso Vittorio Emanuele). Over the centuries, the building underwent numerous transformations. The most significant changes occurred at the end of the 17th century, when the interior spaces were completely redesigned, and the structure was expanded by incorporating adjacent buildings and embellished with an elegant, majestic Baroque façade. These renovations were initiated and entirely funded by the knight Giacomo Cavarretta; hence, the building is also known as Palazzo Cavarretta.

== Sources ==
- Mario Serraino, Trapani nella vita civile e religiosa, Trapani, Cartograf, 1968, pp. 47-60.
- Mario Serraino, Trapani invittissima e fedelissima, Trapani, Corrao, 1985, pp. 37-40.
- Francesco Maria Emanuele Gaetani, Della Sicilia nobile, Palermo, Pietro Bentivenga, 1759, pp. 383-422.
- Giuseppe Calvino, Memoria sul diritto che ha la città di Trapani ad essere capoluogo per la magistratura, Palermo, Francesco Abbate, 1815.
