= Trapani =

Trapani Tràpani (Sicilian) Drèpanon (Greek)
- Comune
- Comune di Trapani
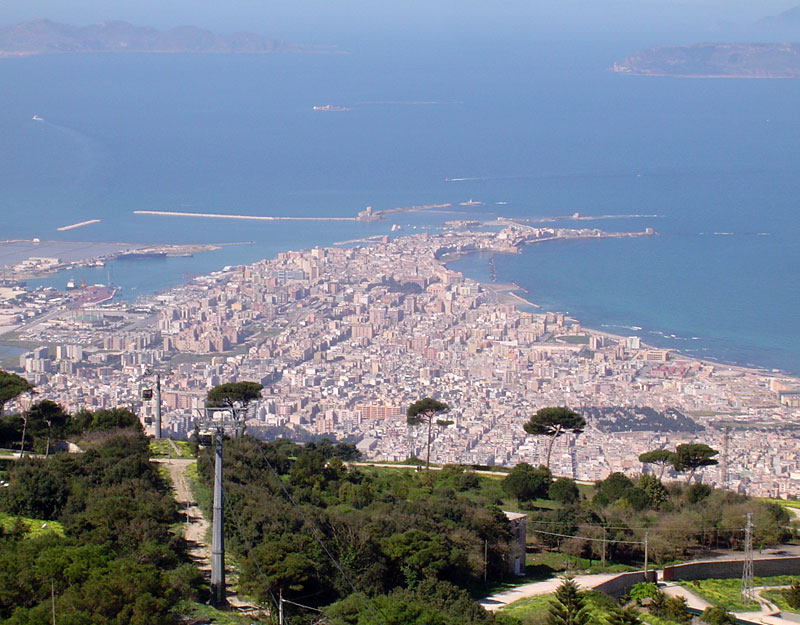
- Trapani seen from Erice. The islands of Favignana (left) and Levanzo (right) can be seen in the background.

- Flag Coat of arms

- The comune of Trapani within the province of Trapani

- Location within Italy Location within Sicily
- Coordinates: 38°01′03″N 12°30′54″E
- Country: Italy
- Region: Sicily
- Province: Trapani (TP)
- Frazioni: Marausa, Xitta, Palma, Fontanasalsa, Guarrato, Fulgatore, Salinagrande, Locogrande, Rilievo, Borgo Fazio, Ummari

Government
  - Mayor: Giacomo Tranchida (PD)

Area
  - Total: 180.61 km^{2} (69.73 sq mi)
- Elevation: 3 m (9.8 ft)

Population (2026)
  - Total: 54,636
  - Density: 302.51/km^{2} (783.49/sq mi)
- Demonym: Trapanese
- Time zone: UTC+1 (CET)
  - Summer (DST): UTC+2 (CEST)
- Postal code: 91100
- Dialing code: 0923
- Patron saint: St. Albert
- Saint day: August 7
- Website: Official website

Trapani (US: /ˈtrɑːpəni/ TRAH-pə-nee; Italian: [ˈtraːpani]; Sicilian: Tràpani [ˈʈɽaːpanɪ]) is a city and comune (municipality) on the western coast of the autonomous island region of Sicily in Italy. It is the capital of the Province of Trapani. Founded by Elymians, the city is still an important fishing port and the main gateway to the nearby Egadi Islands. With a population of 54,636, it is the 11th-largest city in Sicily.

Historically, Trapani developed a thriving economy based on the extraction and trade of salt, benefiting from its strategic position projecting into the Mediterranean Sea, and from its port, which was once the commercial gateway for the ancient city of Eryx (modern-day Erice), situated atop the mountain that overlooks it. Today, its economy relies primarily on the service sector, fishing (historically tuna fishing using traditional methods known as mattanza), marble quarrying and exportation, commercial activities, and tourism.

The urban agglomeration includes approximately 80,000 residents, as it also encompasses the populous district of Casa Santa, administratively belonging to the municipality of Erice.

== History ==
=== Etymology ===
The city was originally named Drépanon from the Greek word for "sickle", because of the curving shape of its harbour.

Two ancient legends relate supposed mythical origins for the city and its name. In the first legend, Trapani stemmed from the sickle which fell from the hands of the goddess Demeter while she was seeking for her daughter Persephone, who had been kidnapped by Hades. The second myth features Kronos, who eviscerated his father Ouranos, god of the sky, with a sickle which, falling into the sea, created the city. In ancient times, Saturn (i.e., the Punic god Baal Hammon) was the patron god of Trapani. Today, Saturn's statue stands in a piazza in the centre of the city.

In Virgil's Aeneid, Anchises, father of Aeneas, died in Drepanum, and after fleeing from Dido, the Trojan hero returned there to hold funeral games in his honor, known as the ludi novendiales.

=== Foundation ===
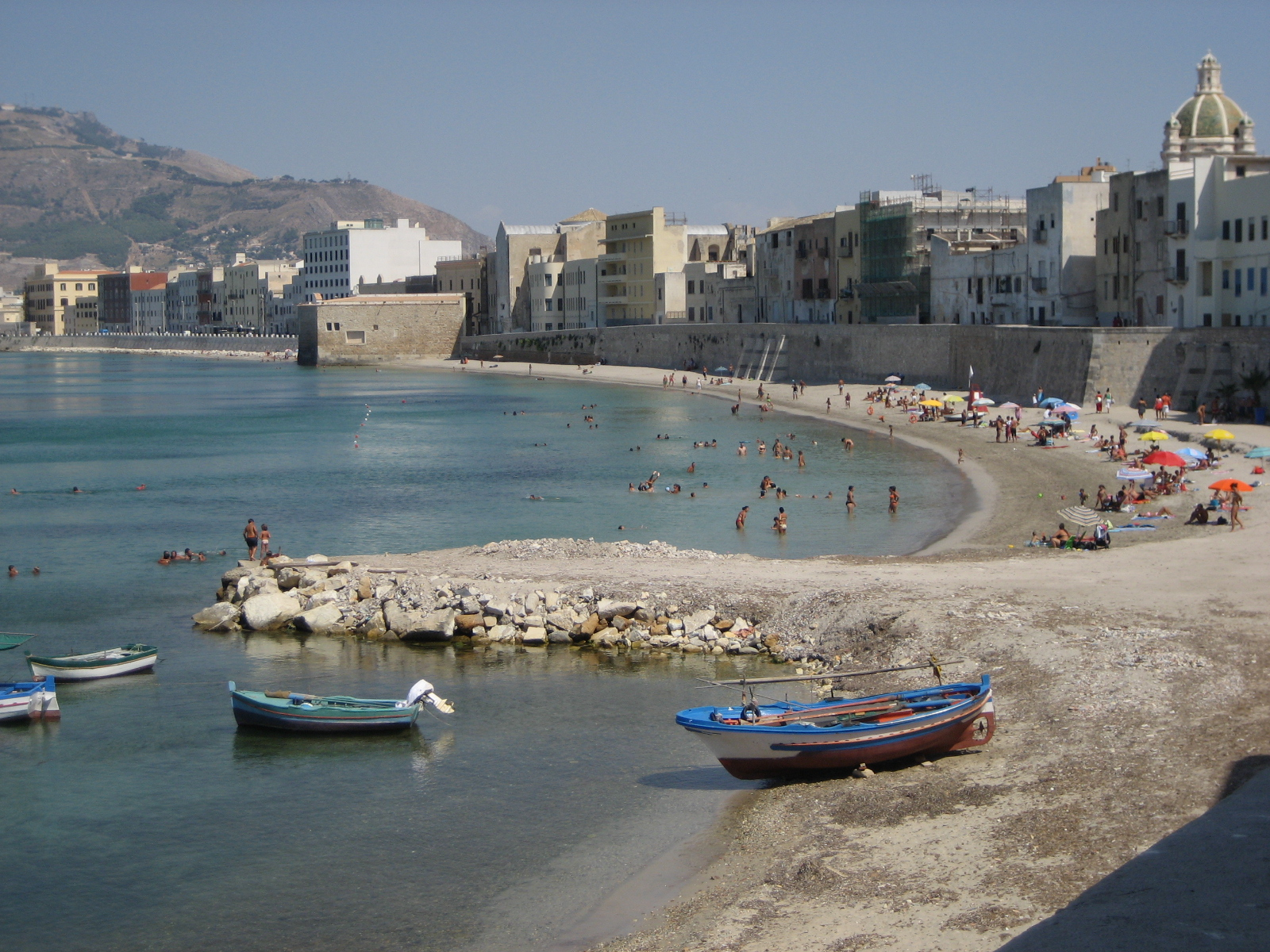
View from the old wall of Tramontana

The founders of the earliest settlement of Drepana were likely the Elymians, a people who inhabited western Sicily during the protohistoric era, with Eryx (modern-day Erice), one of their main centers, overlooking it from Monte Erice. The foundation of Trapani almost certainly predates the fall of Troy (1184 BC). The original village of Trapani probably arose on an island separated from the marshy mainland by a navigable channel, serving as the commercial port for Erice. Due to its favorable geographical location, Trapani quickly developed into a thriving emporium-city.

=== Carthaginian influence ===
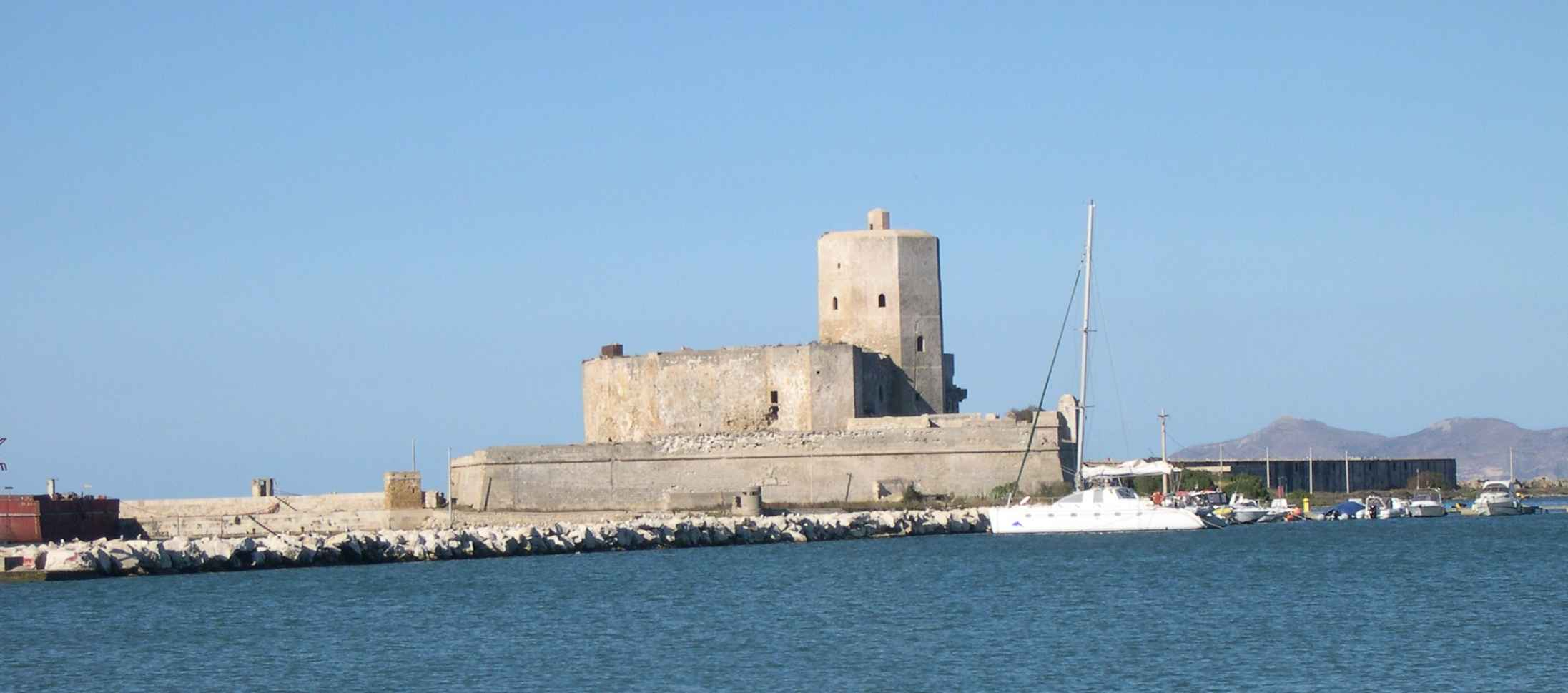
Torre Peliade (Colombaia)

Between the 9th and 8th centuries BC, Trapani came under Punic influence. Throughout the subsequent wars against the Greeks and Syracuse, Trapani fortified itself and remained a steadfast ally of Carthage. In 260 BC, Hamilcar arrived in Sicily, reinforced the city's defensive walls, and constructed the Castello di Terra, the Torre Pali, and the Torre Peliade (also known as Colombaia). He also relocated part of Erice's population to Trapani. The Carthaginian general Adherbal, who had established his military headquarters in the city, defeated the Romans in the Battle of Drepana. Together with Lilybaeum (modern-day Marsala), Drepana was among the last Carthaginian strongholds in Sicily.

=== From Roman times to Spanish domination ===
Trapani's strategic location played a significant role during the First Punic War, notably in 249 BC, when the Carthaginians defeated the Roman fleet in the Battle of Drepana. However, a few years later, in 241 BC, the Romans under Gaius Lutatius Catulus decisively defeated the Carthaginian fleet at the Battle of the Aegates, marking the end of the war. Rome subsequently captured the city, Latinizing its name to Drepanum.

The Romans treated Sicilian cities according to their behavior during the Punic Wars. Drepanum was categorized among the 26 "censorial cities" (civitates censoriae), known for their steadfast resistance against Roman forces. Consequently, Rome penalized the city for its loyalty to Carthage, leading Trapani into a period of decline and depopulation.

After Roman rule, the Vandals and later the Byzantines dominated the city. However, significant growth occurred in the 9th century under Arab rule (from 827), who called the city Itràbinis, Taràbanis, or Tràpanesch, and subsequently under the Normans, who captured Trapani in 1077 under Roger I. In these periods, Trapani flourished commercially and culturally, becoming an essential harbor during the Crusades. Throughout the Middle Ages, Trapani's port was among the most prominent in the Mediterranean; all major maritime republics (Genoa, Pisa, Venice, Amalfi) maintained consulates there. The city notably served as a strategic stopover, especially for Genoa and Pisa, en route to their North African territories.

In 1266, during the War of Saint Sabas, Venetian and Genoese fleets clashed in front of Trapani's harbor, with the Venetians capturing the entire Genoese fleet.

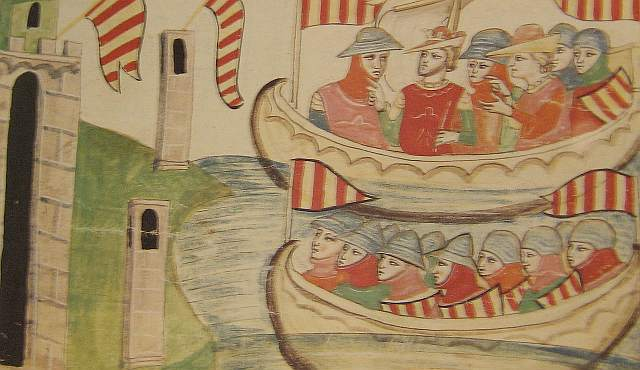
Peter III Aragon, in Trapani (Sicily) during the "Vespri siciliani" (1282) (Biblioteca Vaticana)

In 1282, after a brief period under Angevin control, Trapani played an active role in the Sicilian Vespers rebellion led by Palmiero Abate, subsequently coming under Aragonese rule. Throughout the 14th and 15th centuries, Trapani expanded, becoming the economic and political center of Western Sicily. In 1478, King Ferdinand II of Aragon honored Trapani with the title Invittissima ("Most Invincible"), acknowledging its steadfast resistance to the kingdom's enemies.

In 1516, Trapani was among the Sicilian cities that rebelled against Hugo de Moncada. The revolt was led by Don Simone Sanclemente, who briefly established himself as Capitano di giustizia (Chief Justice), effectively becoming the city's ruler for several months.

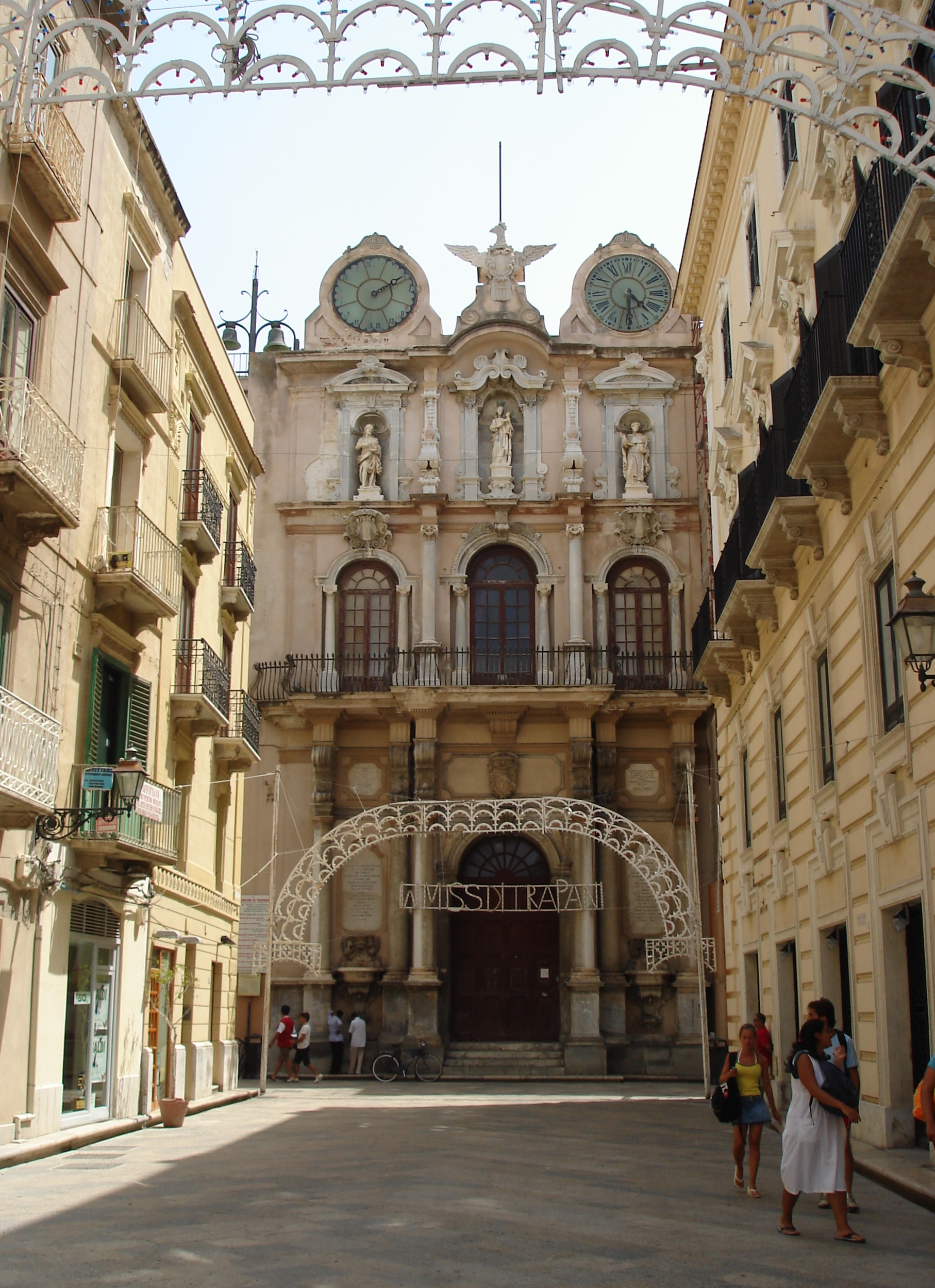
Palazzo Cavarretta or Senatorio, seat of the historical city senate, and of the present-day municipal council

On August 20, 1535, Emperor Charles V arrived in Trapani after conquering Tunis. Recognizing the city's strategic importance, Charles V described Trapani as the "Key to the Kingdom" and swore to uphold its privileges, including the authority granted to the Senate of Trapani to confer university degrees in medicine, physics, theology, mathematics, fine arts, and law. In 1589, Trapani was formally elevated from Terra (land) to Civitas (city).

The 17th century was marked by decline, driven by famine-induced uprisings in 1647 and 1670–1673, and a severe plague outbreak in 1624. However, in the 18th century, the city's population significantly increased, growing from approximately 16,000 to 25,000 inhabitants.

=== From Bourbon rule to fascism ===
Following brief periods under the House of Savoy (1713) and Habsburg rule (1720), Trapani fell under Bourbon dominion starting in the second half of the 18th century, lasting until 1860.

In 1756, Trapani's stonemasons were commissioned to craft the grand staircase (scala regia) of the Royal Palace of Caserta. During Bourbon rule, several marshlands around Trapani were reclaimed, promoting urban development. Residents actively engaged in the commerce of salt and tuna fishing (tonnare). Trapani participated energetically in the Sicilian revolts of 1848–1849, which were violently suppressed. In 1861, Trapani voted in favor of joining the newly established Kingdom of Italy.

After World War I, during which approximately 700 inhabitants of Trapani lost their lives, the city experienced a period of significant growth. Industries related to salt extraction, tuna fishing, wine, and olive oil production made Trapani a dynamic city, economically and culturally. In 1924, following a visit, Benito Mussolini appointed Cesare Mori as prefect of Trapani. After a little more than a year, Mori was transferred to Palermo and granted extraordinary powers to suppress Mafia activity.

During World War II, Trapani became strategically important as a harbor and submarine base. Its airfields at Milo and Chinisia served as critical logistical hubs for Axis troops in North Africa. The city endured extensive bombardments, beginning with French attacks on June 22, 1940, followed by RAF raids on November 10, 1941, and May 31, 1942, as well as 27 subsequent Anglo-American bombings from January to July 1943. These air raids severely damaged Trapani, destroying its historic San Pietro neighborhood entirely and placing the city ninth among Italy’s most heavily bombed provincial capitals. On July 22, 1943, General Patton's Allied forces entered Trapani, encountering a severely devastated city.

=== Contemporary era ===
In the 1946 referendum, the Province of Trapani was the only one in Sicily to vote predominantly in favor of the Republic, although the city itself expressed a monarchist preference. Between 1950 and 1965, Trapani gradually revived its industrial and commercial activities, yet it never fully recovered from the post-war crisis, retreating instead into a service-oriented economy and administrative functions associated with its provincial capital status. The Belice Valley earthquake in January 1968 caused death and destruction in Trapani as well. The city also suffered fatalities in the floods of 1965 and November 5, 1976, the latter resulting in 16 deaths.

Starting in the 1990s, Trapani proactively promoted itself as a tourist, historical, cultural, and sporting destination. This transformation involved restoring the historic city center, developing new urban infrastructure, expanding hospitality and entertainment sectors, and emphasizing its significant historic, architectural, and natural heritage.

In recent years, Trapani has gained international prominence by hosting major cultural exhibitions featuring artists such as Caravaggio, Leonardo da Vinci, and Michelangelo (the rediscovered Crucifix), and notable sporting events, including stages of the prestigious Louis Vuitton Cup.

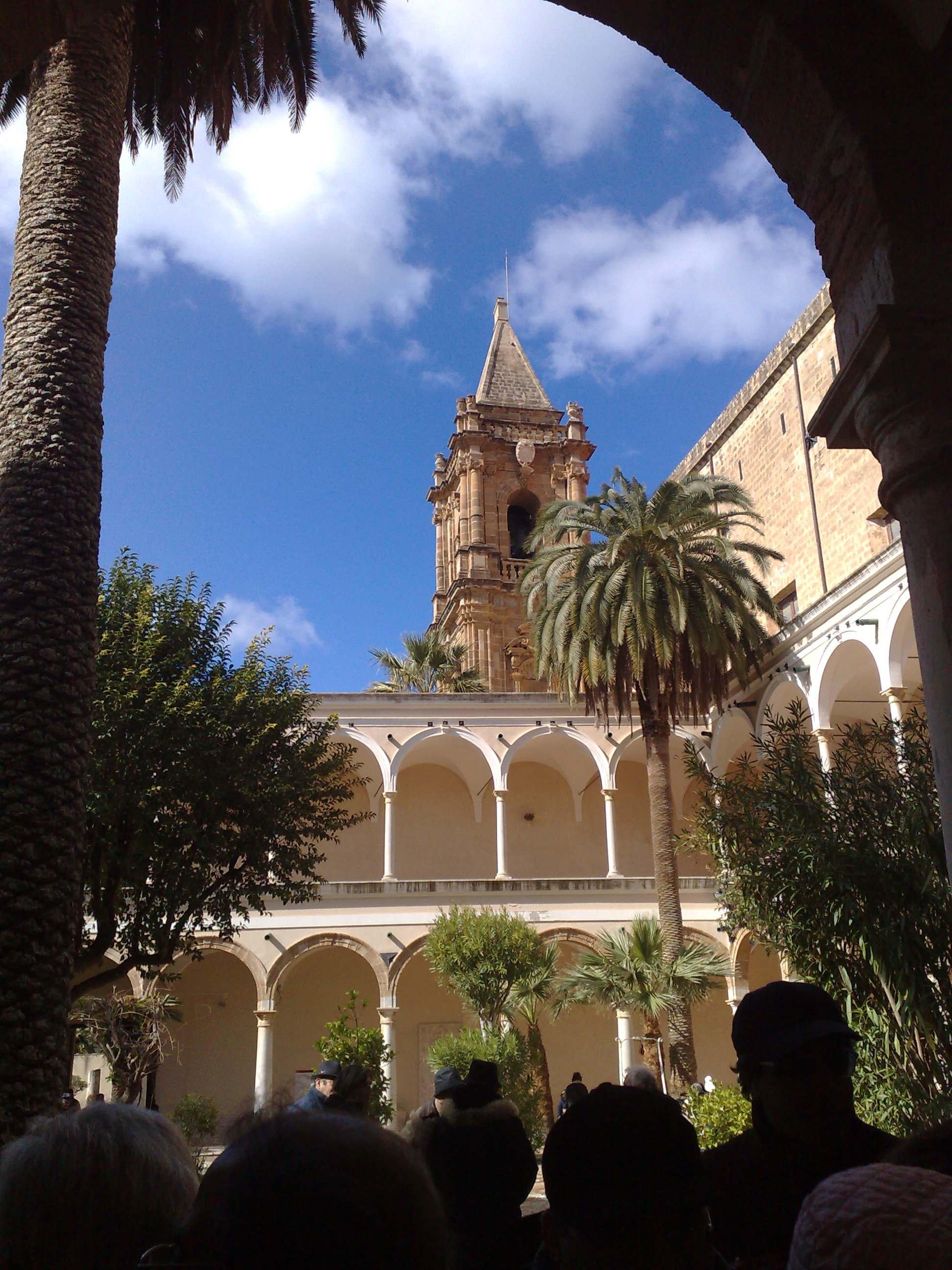
Cloister of the Museum Pepoli

== Geography ==
The comune of Trapani consists of two discontiguous parts separated by the comune of Paceco. The northern part includes much of the city and some rural area; the much larger southern part includes the area of Marausa, half of Trapani-Birgi Airport and a large rural area. The comune does not include the north-eastern suburbs of the urban area, such as Casa Santa, which are part of the comune of Erice. The comune of Trapani has a population of 70,000 but the entire urban, including those parts in the comune of Erice, has over 90,000 residents.

=== Climate ===
Trapani has a hot-summer mediterranean climate with hot and dry summers coupled with moderately wet and mild winters. Summer lows are cooler than in other places of Sicily and Calabria, while at the same time remaining significantly warm for several months.

Climate data for Trapani Birgi, normals 1991–2020, extremes 1991–present
Month	Jan	Feb	Mar	Apr	May	Jun	Jul	Aug	Sep	Oct	Nov	Dec	Year
Record high °C (°F)	20.4 (68.7)	23.6 (74.5)	29.0 (84.2)	33.4 (92.1)	39.4 (102.9)	42.4 (108.3)	42.2 (108.0)	44.0 (111.2)	38.0 (100.4)	33.3 (91.9)	27.2 (81.0)	23.0 (73.4)	44.0 (111.2)
Mean daily maximum °C (°F)	15.1 (59.2)	15.0 (59.0)	17.0 (62.6)	19.7 (67.5)	23.6 (74.5)	27.6 (81.7)	30.3 (86.5)	31.1 (88.0)	28.1 (82.6)	24.3 (75.7)	20.0 (68.0)	16.3 (61.3)	22.3 (72.2)
Daily mean °C (°F)	11.3 (52.3)	11.2 (52.2)	12.9 (55.2)	15.2 (59.4)	18.8 (65.8)	22.6 (72.7)	25.4 (77.7)	26.2 (79.2)	23.7 (74.7)	20.1 (68.2)	16.2 (61.2)	12.9 (55.2)	18.0 (64.5)
Mean daily minimum °C (°F)	7.6 (45.7)	7.3 (45.1)	8.7 (47.7)	10.6 (51.1)	13.9 (57.0)	17.4 (63.3)	20.3 (68.5)	21.2 (70.2)	19.3 (66.7)	15.9 (60.6)	12.4 (54.3)	9.4 (48.9)	13.7 (56.6)
Record low °C (°F)	0.0 (32.0)	−0.2 (31.6)	0.2 (32.4)	1.8 (35.2)	6.0 (42.8)	10.2 (50.4)	13.2 (55.8)	15.0 (59.0)	11.8 (53.2)	6.8 (44.2)	2.4 (36.3)	0.6 (33.1)	−0.2 (31.6)
Average precipitation mm (inches)	65.2 (2.57)	51.7 (2.04)	44.0 (1.73)	33.3 (1.31)	18.8 (0.74)	4.8 (0.19)	2.9 (0.11)	6.3 (0.25)	48.7 (1.92)	66.5 (2.62)	74.6 (2.94)	72.0 (2.83)	488.8 (19.25)
Average precipitation days (≥ 1 mm)	8.9	7.8	6.4	5.3	3.2	1.0	0.5	1.1	4.7	6.6	8.5	10.0	64
Average relative humidity (%)	79.9	78.7	77.7	74.4	72.0	70.8	71.7	71.3	73.7	76.0	78.4	80.0	75.4
Average dew point °C (°F)	7.8 (46.0)	7.3 (45.1)	8.5 (47.3)	9.9 (49.8)	12.9 (55.2)	16.1 (61.0)	19.0 (66.2)	19.8 (67.6)	18.1 (64.6)	15.6 (60.1)	12.0 (53.6)	9.3 (48.7)	13.0 (55.4)
Mean monthly sunshine hours	148.2	161.3	209.3	233.7	290.5	316.8	349.1	318.7	232.2	202.7	157.2	146.3	2,766
Source 1: NOAA (normals and extremes 1991–2020, dew point 1981–2010)
Source 2: Deutscher Wetterdienst (extremes since 2021)

== Demographics ==
Historical population
Year	Pop.	±%
1991	61,807	—
2001	60,847	−1.6%
2011	61,270	+0.7%
2021	56,293	−8.1%
Source: City Population, ISTAT

As of 2026, the population is 54,636, of which 48.6% are males, and 51.4% are females. Minors make up 14.5% of the population, and seniors make up 25.4%.

=== Immigration ===
As of 2025, immigrants make up 6.4% of the total population. The 5 largest foreign countries of birth are Romania, Tunisia, Nigeria, Germany, and Morocco.

== Culture ==
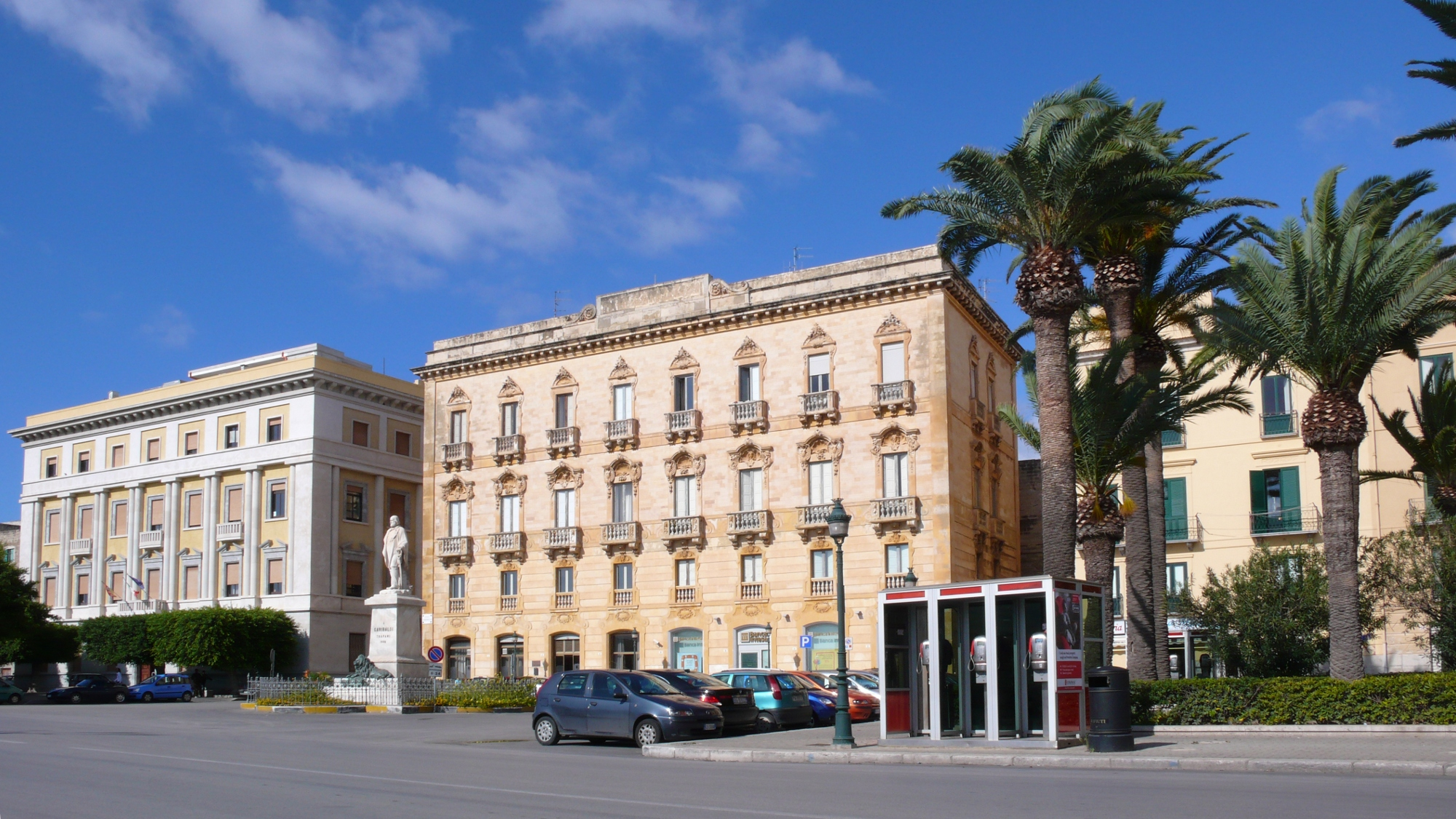
Piazza Garibaldi

The old city of Trapani dates from the later medieval or early modern periods; there are no more remains of the ancient city and many of the city's historic buildings are designed in the Baroque style.

- The Church of Sant'Agostino (14th century)
- The Church of Santa Maria di Gesù (15th–16th centuries)
- Basilica-Sanctuary of Maria Santissima Annunziata (also called "Madonna di Trapani") originally built in 1315–1332 and rebuilt in 1760. It houses Museo regionale Agostino Pepoli and a marble statue of the Madonna of Trapani, which might be attributed to the work of Nino Pisano.
- Fontana di Tritone ("Triton's Fountain")
- The Baroque Palazzo della Giudecca or Casa Ciambra.
- The cathedral (built in 1421, but restored in the 18th century by Giovanni Biagio Amico). It includes a painting of "Annunciation" attributed to Anthony van Dyck.
- Church of Maria SS. dell'Intria, an example of Sicilian Baroque.
- Church of Badia Nuova, a small Baroque church.
- Castello di Terra, a ruined 12th-century castle, today police office.
- Ligny Tower, a 17th-century watchtower housing Phreistory museum.
- Regional Museum Agostino Pepoli - Located in the 14th-century Carmelite convent, adjacent to the Sanctuary of Basilica-Sanctuary of Maria Santissima Annunziata, it is one of the most important Sicilian museums. It houses acollection of decorative arts, sculptures (including works by the Gagini), cribs and coral jewelry, and an art gallery that includes, among others, paintings by Titian and Giacomo Balla.
- Museum of Prehistory - It is housed inside the seventeenth-century Torre di Ligny, on the extreme western point of the city, and preserves important prehistoric evidence of human presence in the area, as well as finds (artifacts, amphorae, anchors, a Punic helmet) from the sea of Trapani.
- Museum of Contemporary Art San Rocco - Housed inside Palazzo San Rocco, in the historic center.
- DiArt, diocesan collection of permanent religious art, housed in the episcopal seminary of Raganzìli in Casa Santa locality.
- Diocesan Museum, in the Church of Sant'Agostino
- Optical Illusions Museum
- Specus Corallii designed by architect Antonino Cardillo

=== Folklore ===
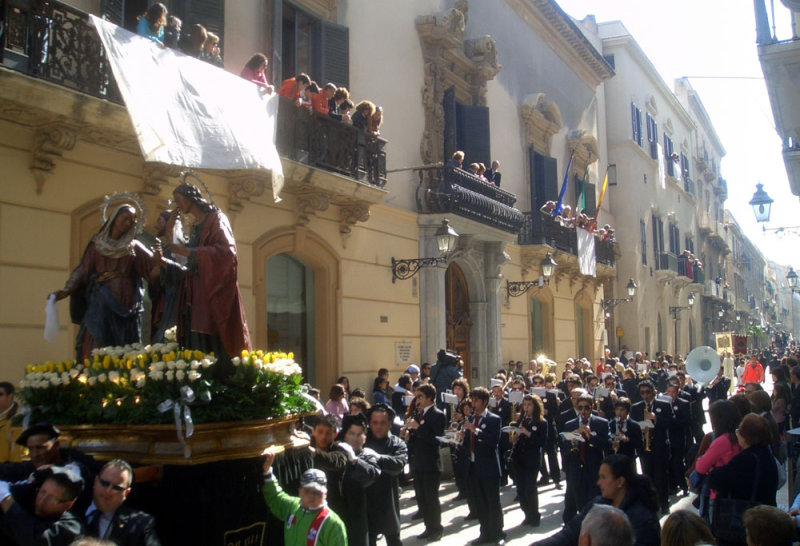
Easter procession, The Misteri

The city is renowned for its Easter related Holy Week activities and traditions, culminating between Good Friday and Holy Saturday in the Processione dei Misteri di Trapani, colloquially simply the Misteri di Trapani (in English the Procession of the Mysteries of Trapani or the Mysteries of Trapani), a day-long passion procession organized and sponsored by the city's guilds, featuring twenty floats of wood, canvas and glue sculptures, mostly from the 17th and 18th centuries, of individual scenes of the events of the Passion.

The Misteri are among the oldest continuously running religious events in Europe, having been played every Good Friday since before the Easter of 1612. Running for at least 16 continuous hours, but occasionally well beyond the 24 hours, they are the longest religious festival in Sicily and in Italy. Important also to the cult of the Madonna of Trapani.

The city gives its name to a variety of pesto – pesto alla trapanese – made using almonds instead of the traditional pine nuts in Ligurian pesto.

== Economy ==
Much of Trapani's economy still depends on the sea and fishing and canning are the main local industries. Coral is also an important export, along with salt, marble, and marsala wine. The nearby coast is lined with numerous saltworks formed by the evaporation of seawater situated majestically along the coast road between Trapani and Marsala.

The city is also an important ferry port, with links to the Egadi Islands, Pantelleria, Sardinia, France and Tunisia. It also has its own airport, the Trapani-Birgi Airport.

=== Fishing ===
Trapani is one of the traditional locations of the mattanza tuna fishing technique, alongside: (San Giuliano, San Cusumano, Isola di Formica, Favignana, Bonagia, San Vito Lo Capo, Scopello, Capo Granitola). Today, this technique is forbidden but the fishing port is very active and hosts 142 small and medium fishing boats, for a total of 2805 GRT (gross tonnage).

The old fish market, renovated in 1998, is now used for cultural events and a new one, large and modern, more functional to fishing activities has been located near the port. It represents the only market in the Province and its recent restructuring, with European funds, places it at the forefront in the national level both in terms of marketing and product traceability.

=== Coral processing ===
Between the fifteenth and sixteenth centuries Trapani fishermen began to practice coral fishing, and coral craftmen started to develop its processing succeeding throughout the Mediterranean. A network of prestigious commissions was consolidated throughout Europe and it was thus possible to produce ever richer and more elaborate works. Today, however, fishing has almost completely disappeared, while coral processing is limited to few craftsmen.

=== Saltworks ===
Windmills and saltworks are evidence of industrial archeology. Saltworks are located in the area of Natural Reserve of Saline di Trapani and Paceco managed by the WWF and characterized by a remarkable flora and fauna. Thanks to the protection guaranteed by the Reserve, the activity of the saltworkers and the production of salt have increased, favoring the return and reproduction of dozens of species of migratory birds, including the pink flamingo.

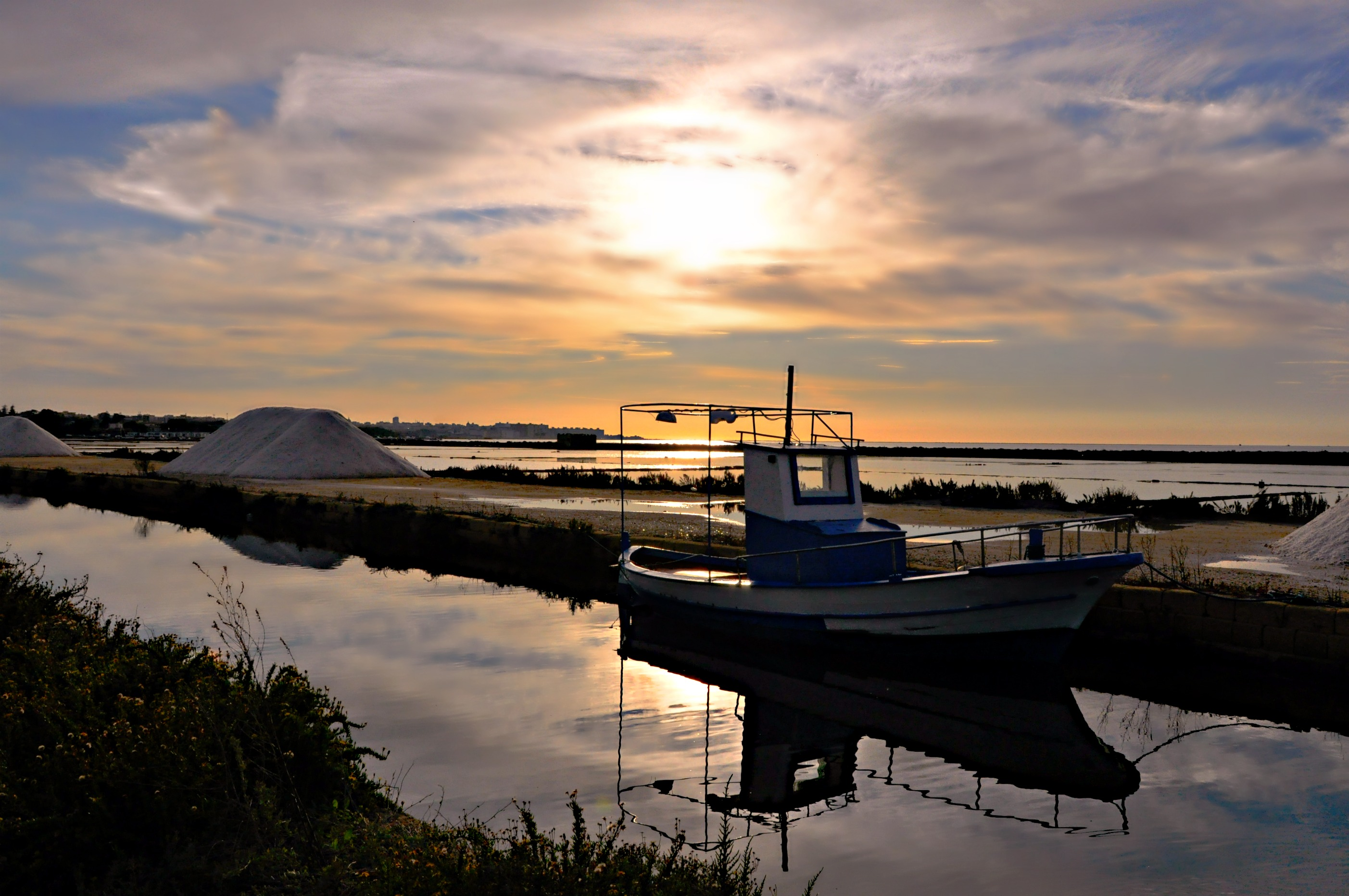

== Transport ==
Trapani-Birgi Airport is a military-civil joint use airport (third for traffic on the island). Recently the airport has seen an increase of traffic thanks to low-cost carriers from all parts of Europe (i.e. London-Stansted and London-Luton, Paris Beauvais, Dublin, Bruxelles, Munich, Frankfurt, Eindhoven, Stockholm, Malta, Bratislava).

== Sport ==
From September 28 to October 9, 2005, Trapani was the location of Acts 8 and 9 of the Louis Vuitton Cup. This sailing race featured, among other entrants, all the boats that took part in the 2007 America's Cup.

The town is also the base for the local football team Trapani Calcio. Founded in 1905, they are nicknamed the Granata (the Maroons) after their kit colour. In 2010, Trapani Calcio was admitted into the 2010–11 Lega Pro Seconda Divisione (formerly Serie C2), ending the club's 13-year absence from the professional ranks. Subsequently, it made debut in Serie B in the 2013–14 season. It currently plays in Serie B with the coach Fabrizio Castori.

== International relations ==
=== Twin towns – sister cities ===
Trapani is twinned with:

- Constanța, Romania
- Les Sables-d'Olonne, France
- Roquefort-les-Pins, France
- Würselen, Germany

== Identification as Ithaca ==
Samuel Butler claimed, following visits in Trapani, that the city and its neighboring islands is the inspiration for both Odysseus's home of Ithaca as described in Homer's Odyssey, and Scheria, where Odysseus met Nausicaa.

== Gallery ==
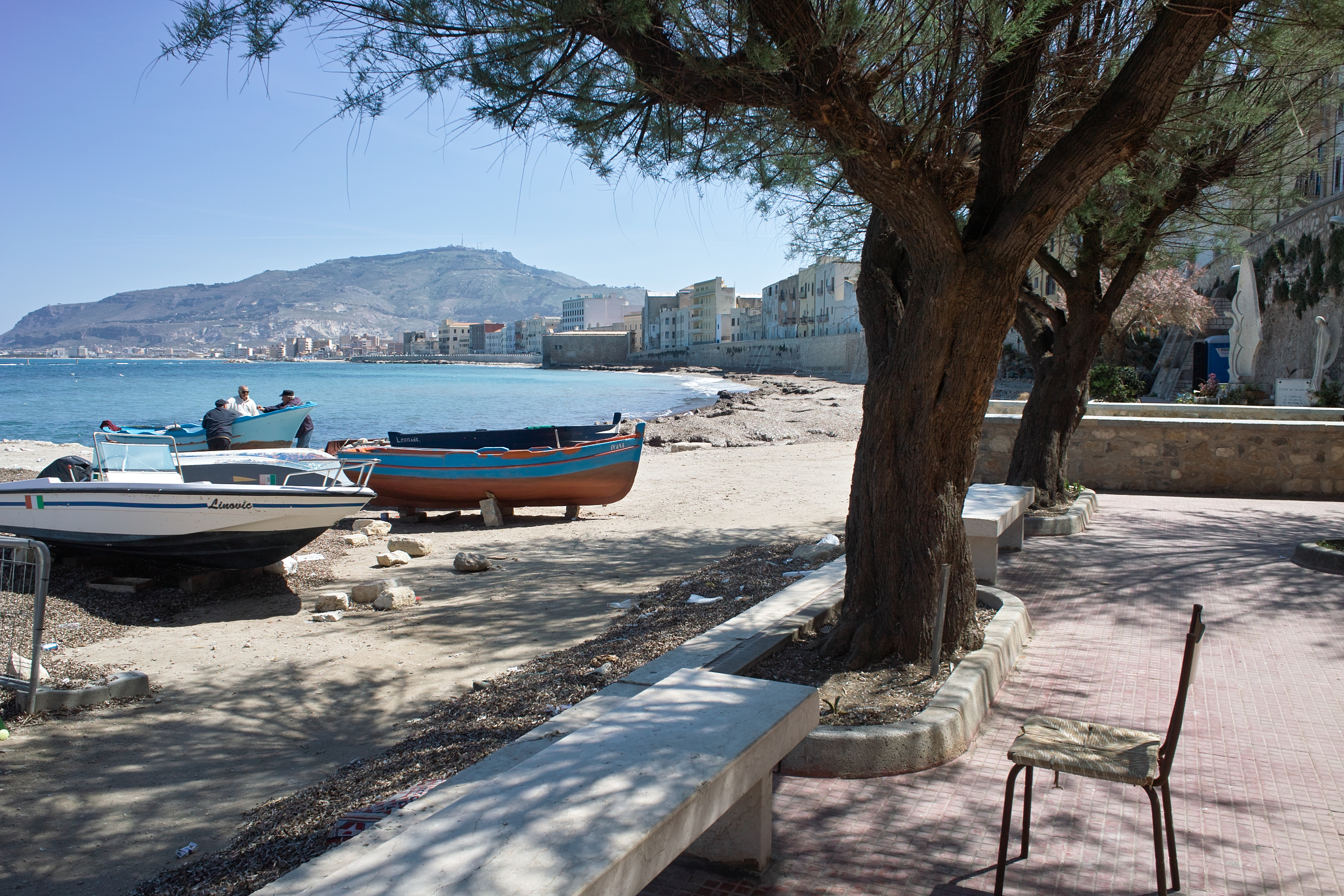
Mura di Tramontana

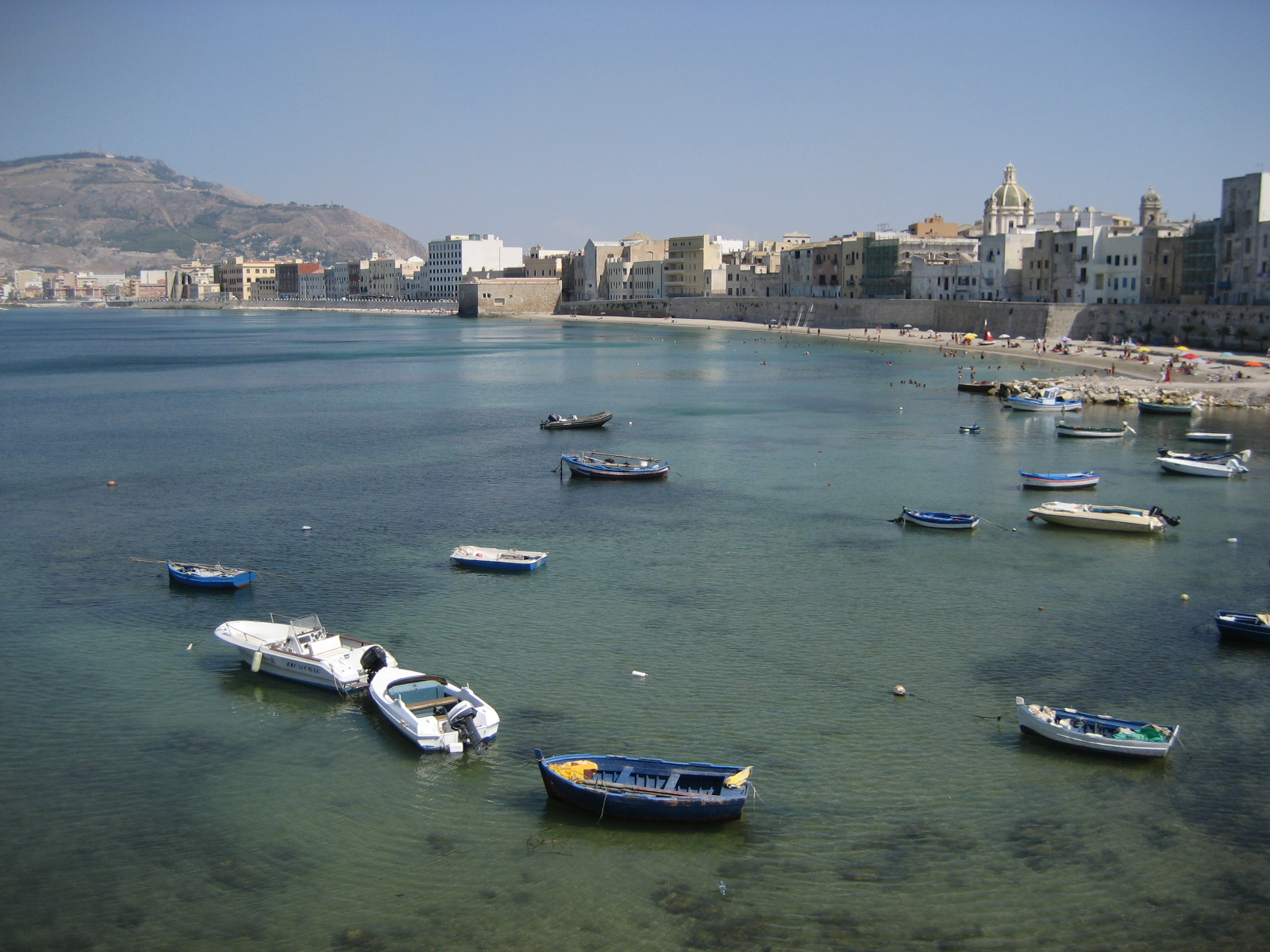
Mura di Tramontana (centro storico)

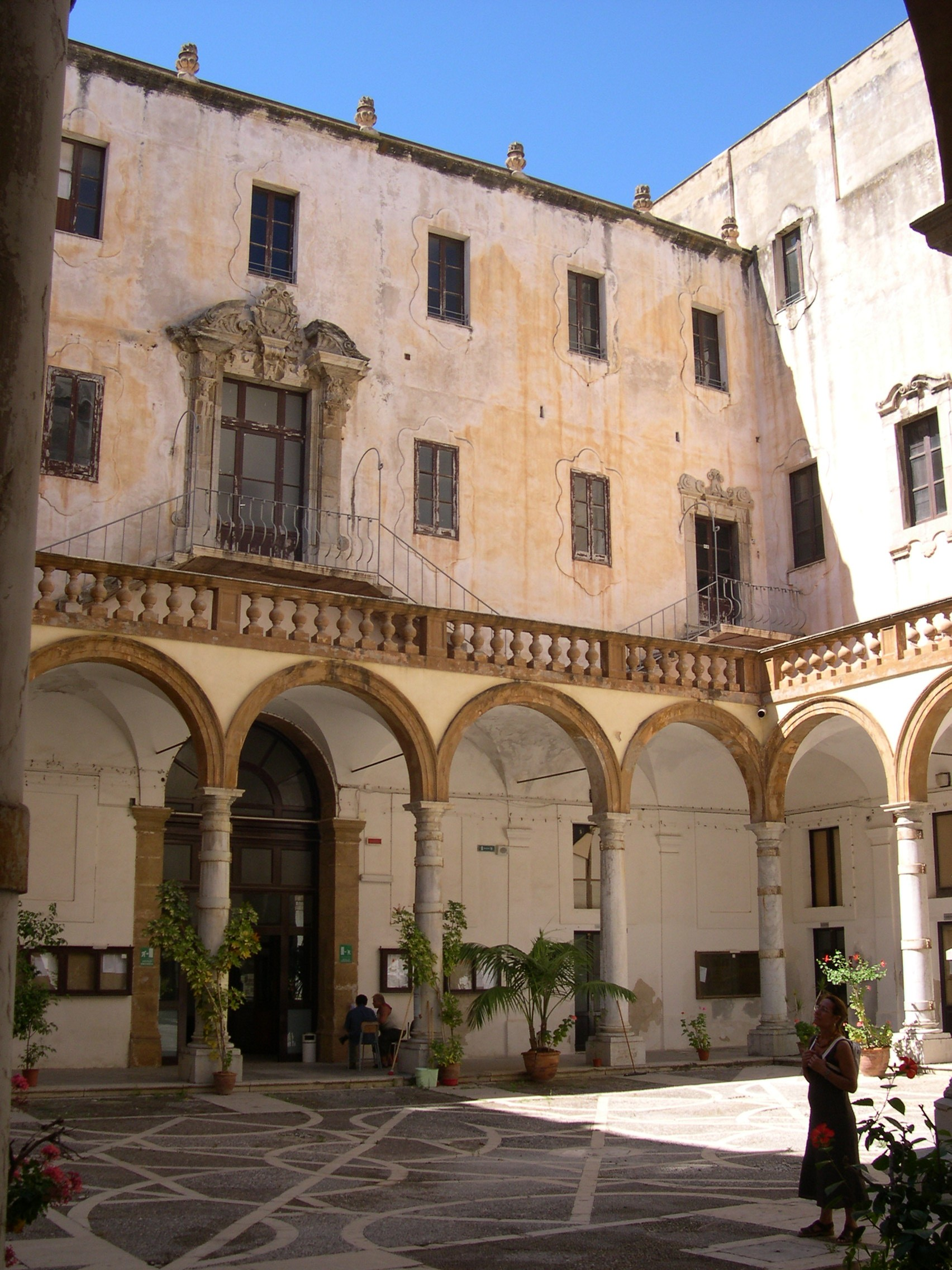
Chiostro dei gesuiti

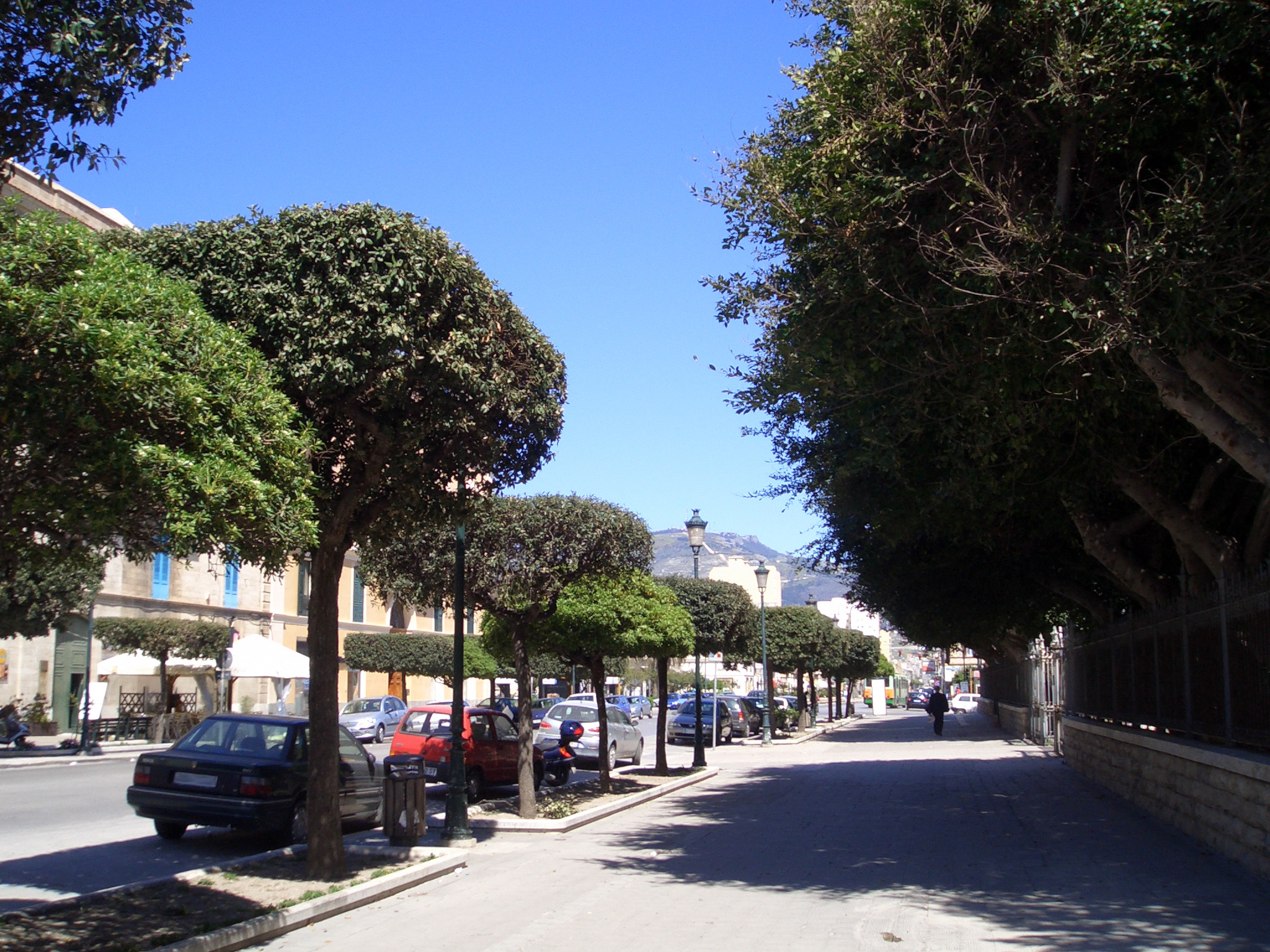
Via Regina Margherita

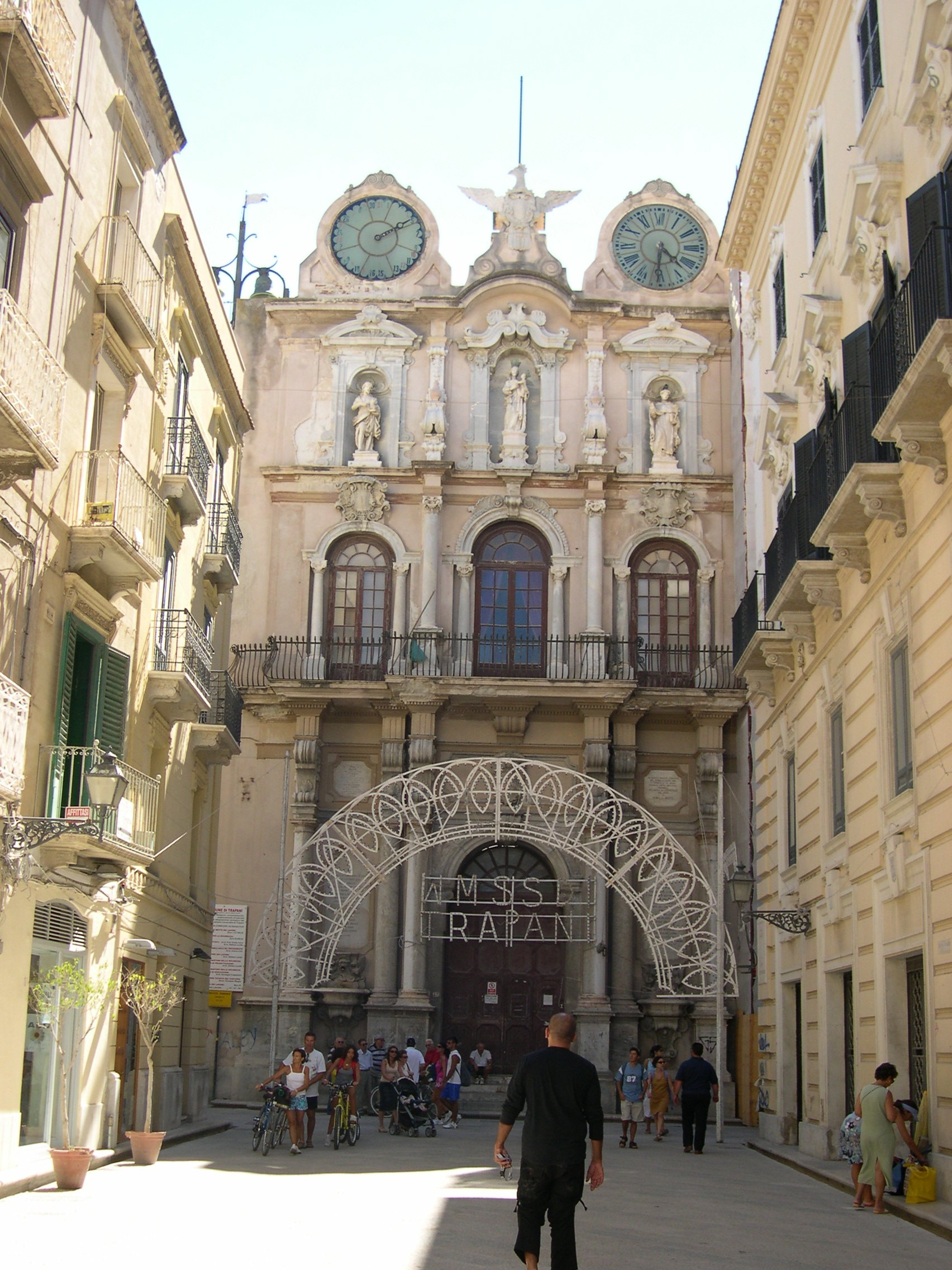
Palazzo Cavarretta in Via Torrearsa

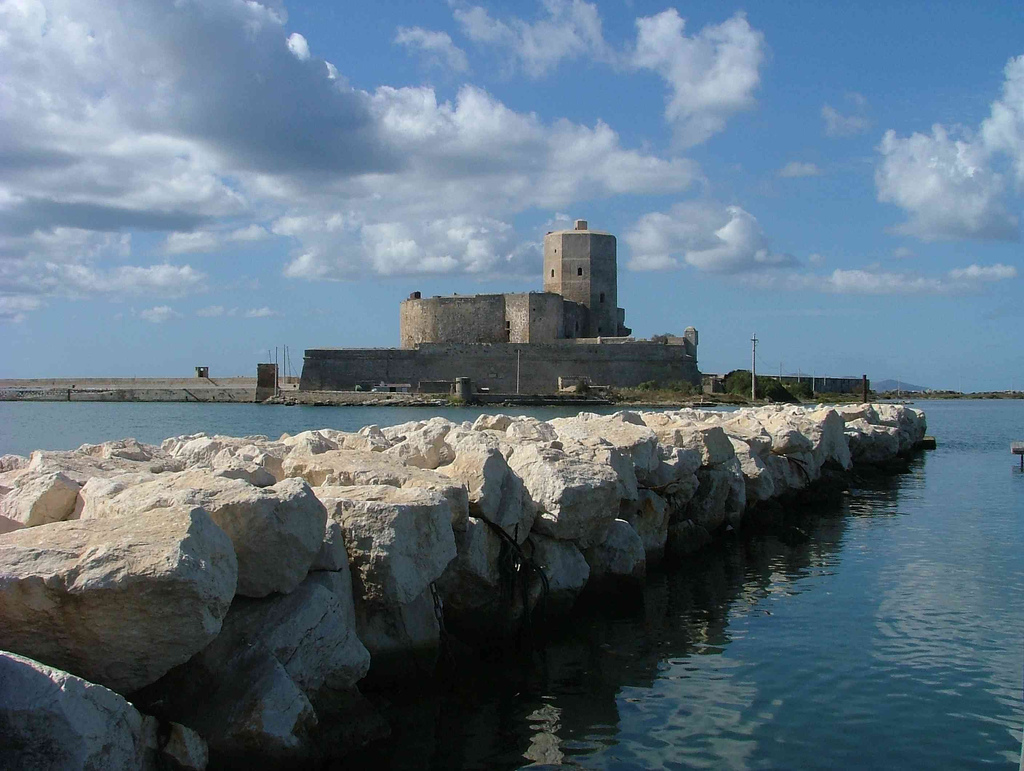
Chiesa di San Liberale

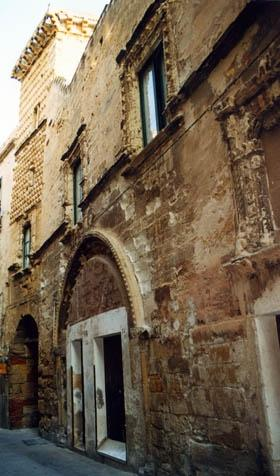
Palazzo della Giudecca

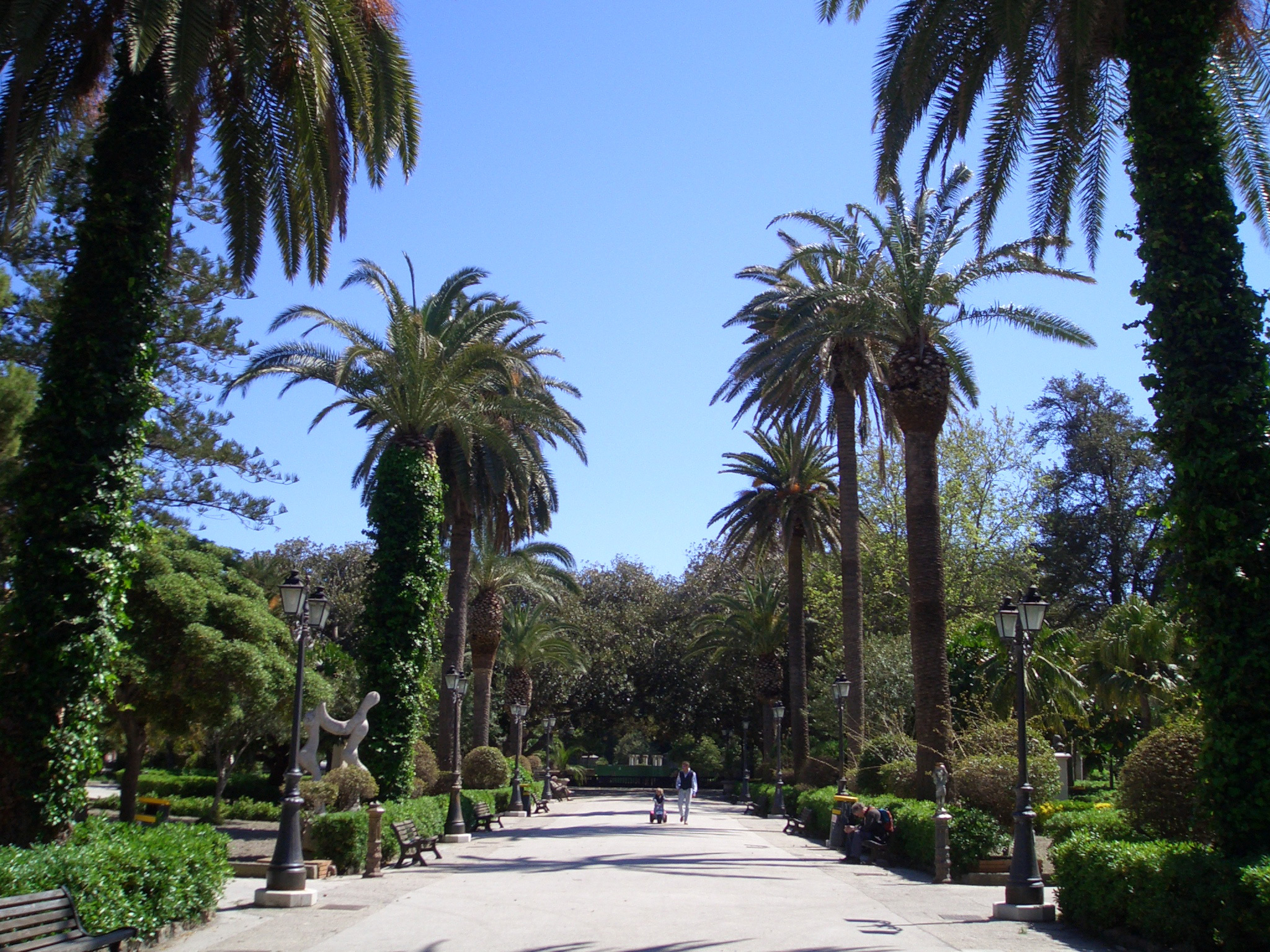
Villa Margherita

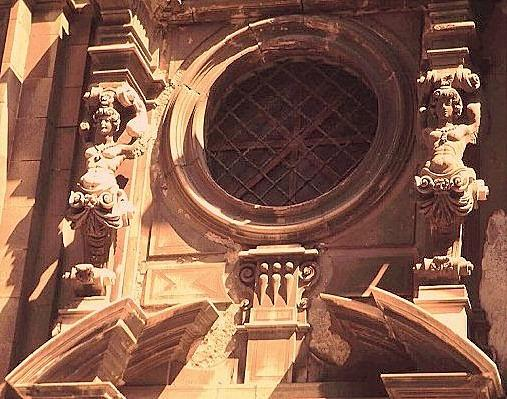

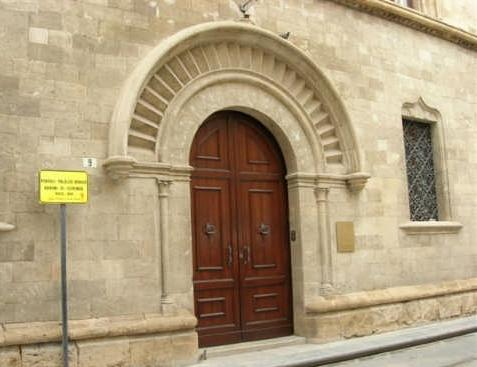

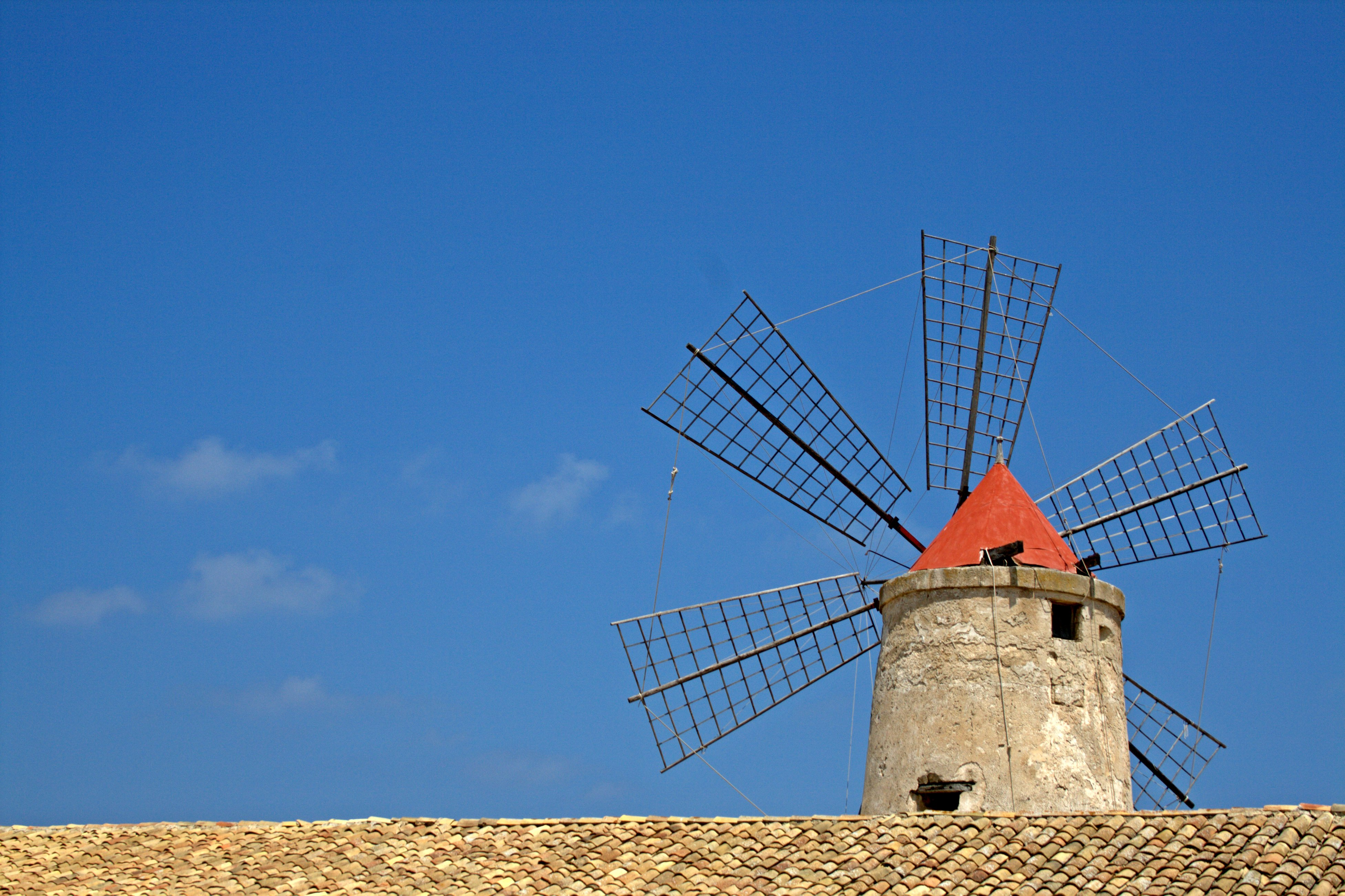
Windmill of the Salina

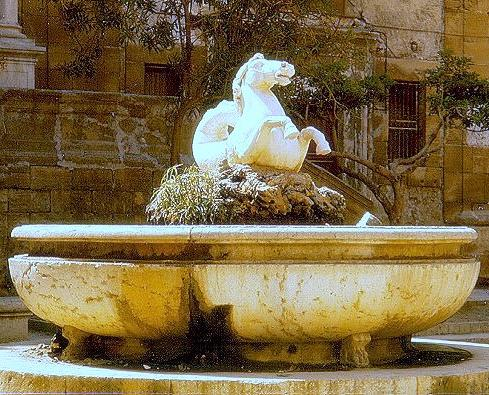

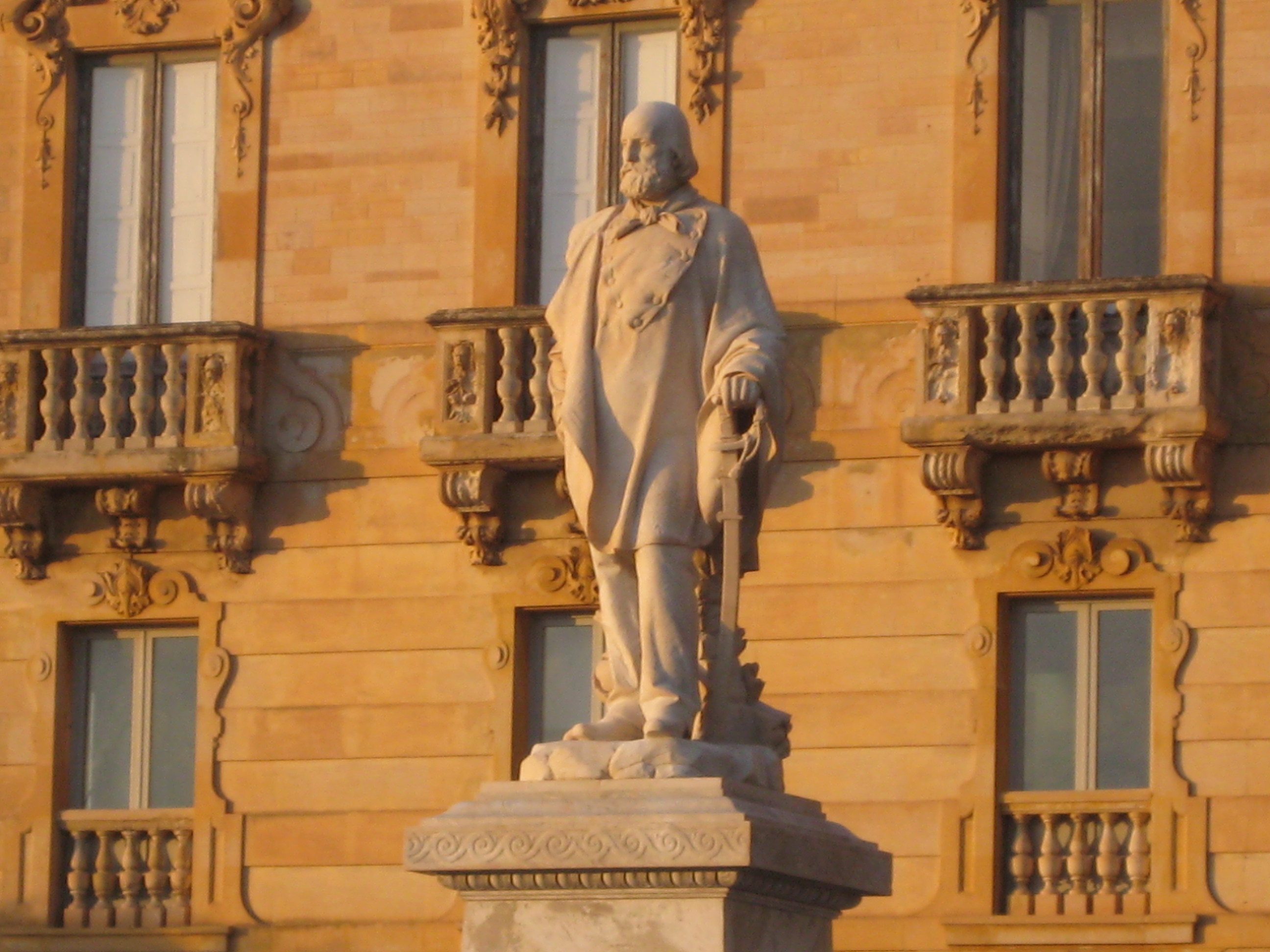

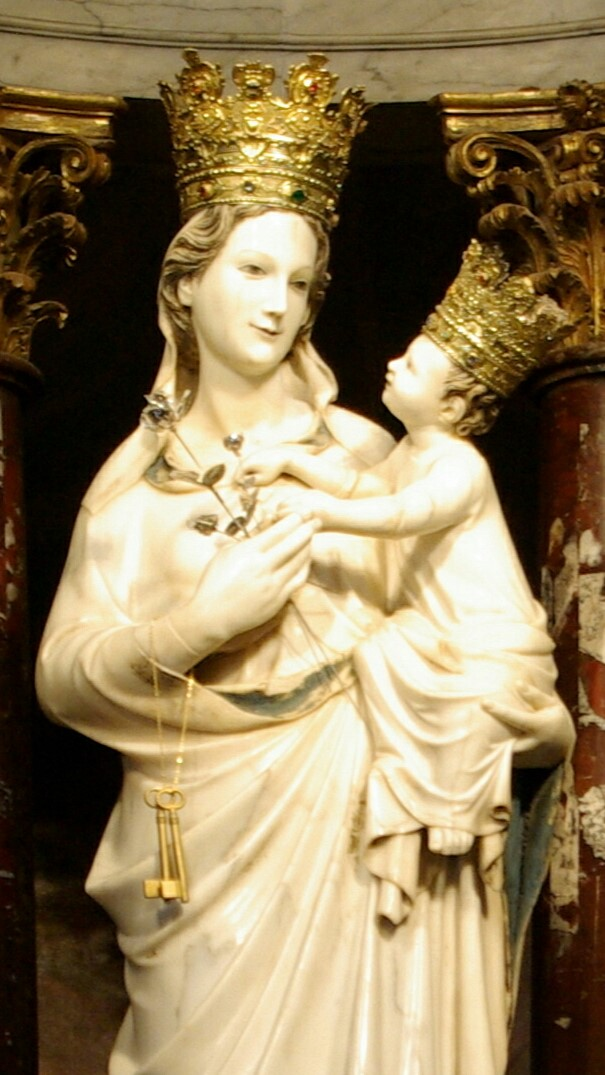
Our Lady of Trapani, the patroness of the town. Crowned in 1734 with a papal decree of Pope Clement XII.

== See also ==
- Battle of Drepana
- Drepana
