= Ligny Tower =

- Torre di Ligny
- Trapani, Sicily, Italy
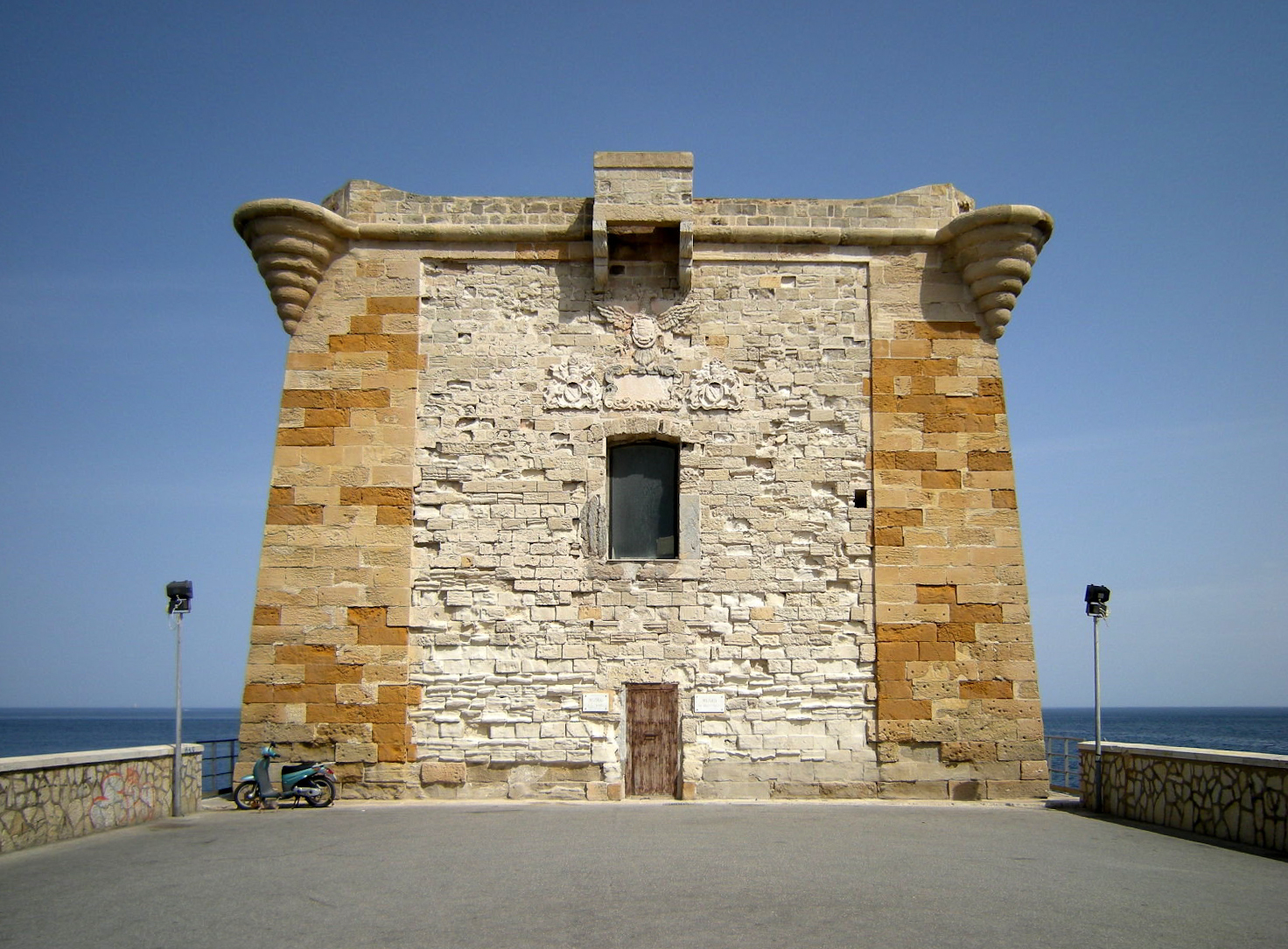
- View of Ligny Tower

Site information
- Type: Coastal watchtower
- Controlled by: Museo civico Torre di Ligny
- Open to the public: Yes
- Condition: Intact

Location
- Coordinates: 38°1′10.7″N 12°29′49″E

Site history
- Built: 1671–1672
- Built by: Kingdom of Sicily
- In use: 1672–1862; 1940s

Ligny Tower (Italian: Torre di Ligny, Sicilian: Turrignì) is a coastal watchtower in Trapani, Sicily. It was built between 1671 and 1672 at a strategic position on the city's western coast. Today, the tower is in good condition, and it is open to the public as an archaeological museum.

== History ==
Ligny Tower was built on a narrow strip of land on Trapani's western coast, to defend the city from attacks by the Barbary corsairs. It was named after the Viceroy of Sicily, Claude Lamoral, 3rd Prince of Ligne, who had ordered its construction. The tower was designed by the Flemish architect Carlos de Grunenbergh. It has a square base with scarped walls, with four corner turrets which originally contained lanterns.

The tower was proposed in a meeting held at Palermo on 11 January 1670. Construction began in 1671, and it was inaugurated in October 1672.

A passage connecting the tower with the mainland was built in 1806, and guns were installed on the tower's roof until 1862. It was subsequently used as a semaphore station, but it was eventually abandoned.

In World War II, the tower was used by the Regia Marina and was armed with anti-aircraft guns.

== Present day ==
The tower was restored in 1979 by the architect Francesco Terranova. Since 1983, the tower has been an archaeological museum, known as Museo civico Torre di Ligny.
