= Mike Tyson vs. Michael Spinks =

Boxing competition

Once and For All
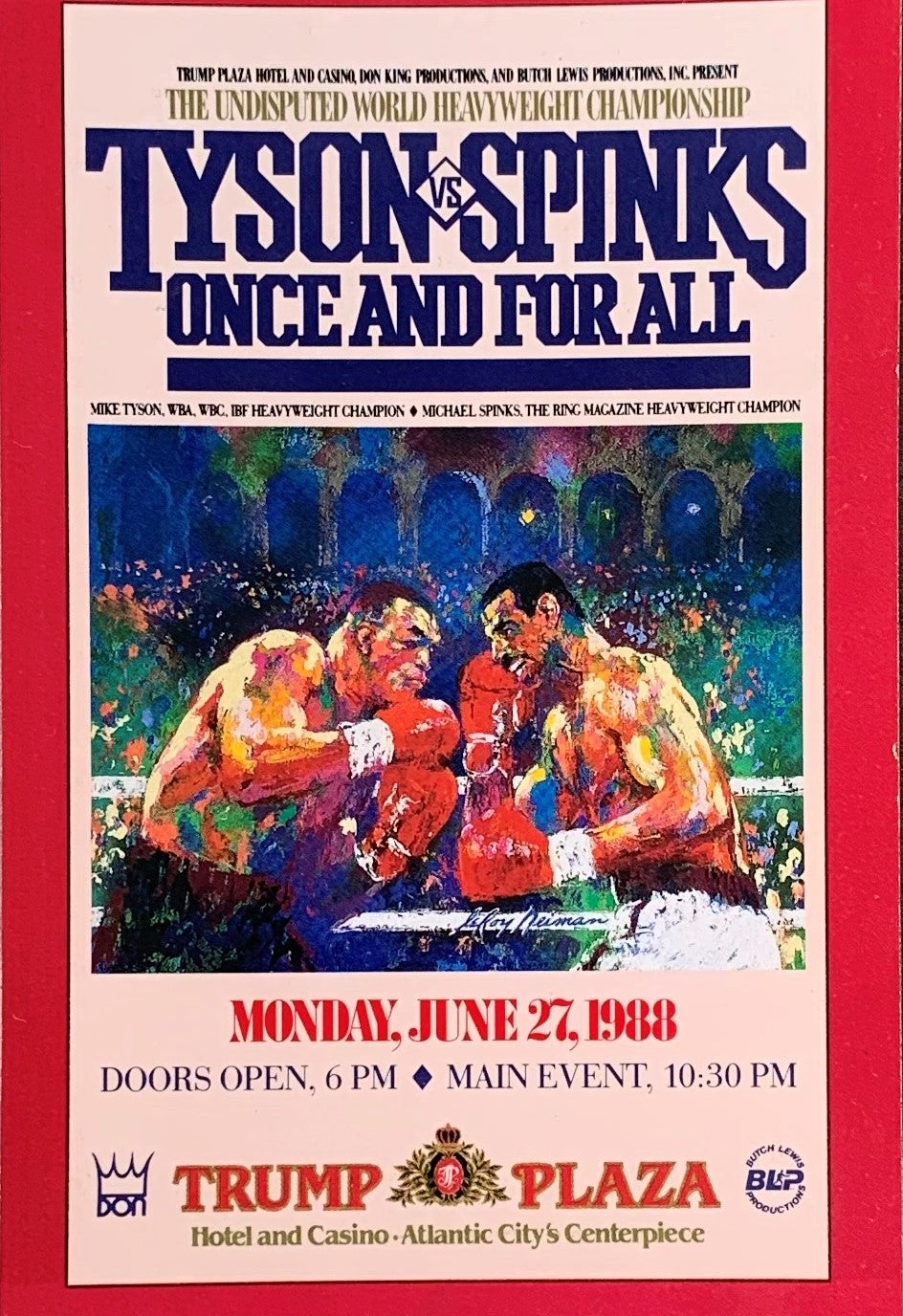
- A pre-fight mural by LeRoy Neiman
- Date: June 27, 1988
- Venue: Convention Hall, Atlantic City, New Jersey
- Title(s) on the line: WBA, WBC, IBF, The Ring and Lineal Undisputed heavyweight titles

Tale of the tape
| Boxer | Mike Tyson | Michael Spinks |
| Nickname | Iron | Jinx |
| Hometown | Catskill, New York | St. Louis, Missouri |
| Purse | $22,000,000 | $13,500,000 |
| Pre-fight record | 34–0 (30 KO) | 31–0 (21 KO) |
| Age | 21 years, 11 months | 31 years, 11 months |
| Height | 5 ft 10 in (178 cm) | 6 ft 2 1/2 in (189 cm) |
| Weight | 218 1/4 lb (99 kg) | 212 1/4 lb (96 kg) |
| Style | Orthodox | Orthodox |
| Recognition | WBA, WBC and IBF; Heavyweight Champion; The Ring; No. 1 Ranked Heavyweight | The Ring and Lineal; Heavyweight Champion; 2-division world champion |

Result
- Tyson wins via 1st-round KO

Mike Tyson vs. Michael Spinks, billed as Once and For All, was a professional boxing match which took place on June 27, 1988. Both fighters were undefeated and each had a claim to being the legitimate heavyweight champion. At the time, Tyson held the belts of all three of the major sanctioning organizations (WBA, WBC, and IBF) while Spinks was The Ring and Lineal champion. The fight was held at the Convention Hall, Atlantic City, New Jersey; at the time, it was the richest fight in boxing history, grossing some $70 million, of which Tyson earned a record purse of around $22 million and Spinks $13.5 million. Tyson won the fight, knocking out Spinks in 91 seconds.

== Background ==
Tyson had won HBO's Heavyweight World Series, which saw all three major sanctioning bodies cooperate with HBO and Don King Productions to stage a tournament that would produce an undisputed world heavyweight champion. Over the course of eighteen months, he took the WBC title from Trevor Berbick, the WBA title from James “Bonecrusher” Smith, and the IBF title from Tony Tucker and became the first fighter to be regarded as undisputed champion since Leon Spinks in 1978.

However, while Tyson was the sanctioning bodies’ champion, he had not garnered universal recognition as champion. Spinks had entered the tournament as the IBF champion, a title he had held since defeating Larry Holmes in 1985. He competed in two bouts in the tournament and won them both, a disputed 15-round decision in a rematch with Holmes and a knockout over Steffen Tangstad. This had set up a match between Spinks and Tucker, the IBF's top contender, but Spinks began negotiating to fight Gerry Cooney instead of Tucker and the IBF responded by stripping Spinks, taking him out of the tournament. Despite this, Spinks was still recognized by The Ring as its world champion and was also still considered to be the lineal champion, honors which he had yet to be defeated for.

== History ==
Michael Spinks became a professional boxer shortly after he won the gold medal at middleweight in the 1976 Summer Olympics. Initially, Spinks was more concerned with assisting his brother Leon's rise to the heavyweight championship, but was later convinced to turn pro himself. In 1981 Spinks fought Eddie Mustafa Muhammad for the WBA light heavyweight championship and defeated him by decision to win his first world title. Spinks won the WBC title from Dwight Braxton in 1983 to become the undisputed champion. In 1984, Spinks added the newly created IBF title. In September 1985, after having defended his titles a combined total of ten times, Spinks moved up to the heavyweight class to challenge reigning IBF, Ring, and lineal champion Larry Holmes, who had been champion since 1978. Spinks defeated Holmes in a fifteen-round decision to become the first reigning light heavyweight champion to win the heavyweight championship. Spinks defeated Holmes again in a rematch and then successfully defended his title against Steffen Tangstad. Instead of defending his IBF title against top contender Tony Tucker, Spinks elected to take a more lucrative fight with former contender Gerry Cooney, who had fought three times in five years, in June 1987. The IBF responded by stripping Spinks of the title, but he was still in possession of the lineal and Ring titles and was considered by many to still be the rightful champion.

Mike Tyson turned professional in 1985 and won his first 19 fights by knockout, quickly garnering media attention and establishing an "aura of invincibility". In November 1986 Tyson knocked out Trevor Berbick to win the WBC heavyweight title; at 20 years old, Tyson was the youngest heavyweight champion in history. In his very next fight Tyson faced James "Bonecrusher" Smith, who had won the WBA title in an upset over Tim Witherspoon earlier in 1986, and defeated him by unanimous decision. Tyson then took a tune-up fight against former world champion Pinklon Thomas and knocked him out in six rounds, then waited for the result of a fight between Tucker and James 'Buster' Douglas for the vacant IBF title that had been stripped from Spinks. Tyson faced Tucker, the winner, in August 1987 and won by unanimous decision, becoming the first fighter to unify all three major titles. Tyson then defended his unified title three times, by knocking out Olympic gold medalist Tyrell Biggs in October 1987 in seven rounds, facing a returning Larry Holmes in January 1988 and knocking him out in four rounds, and finally by knocking out another former world champion Tony Tubbs in two rounds two months later. By 1988 Tyson had become "the most talked about – and marketable – heavyweight champion since Muhammad Ali".

== Build up ==
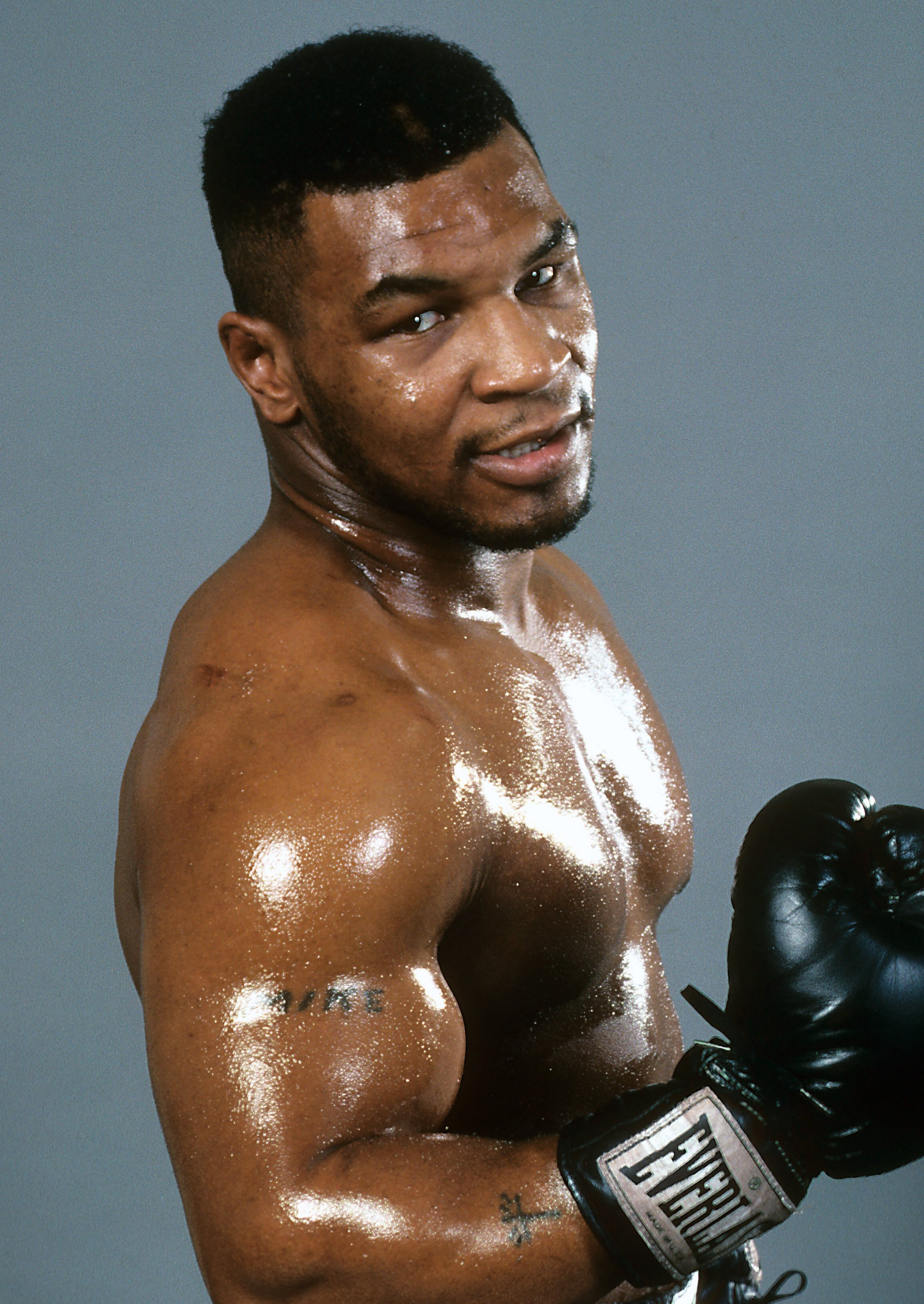
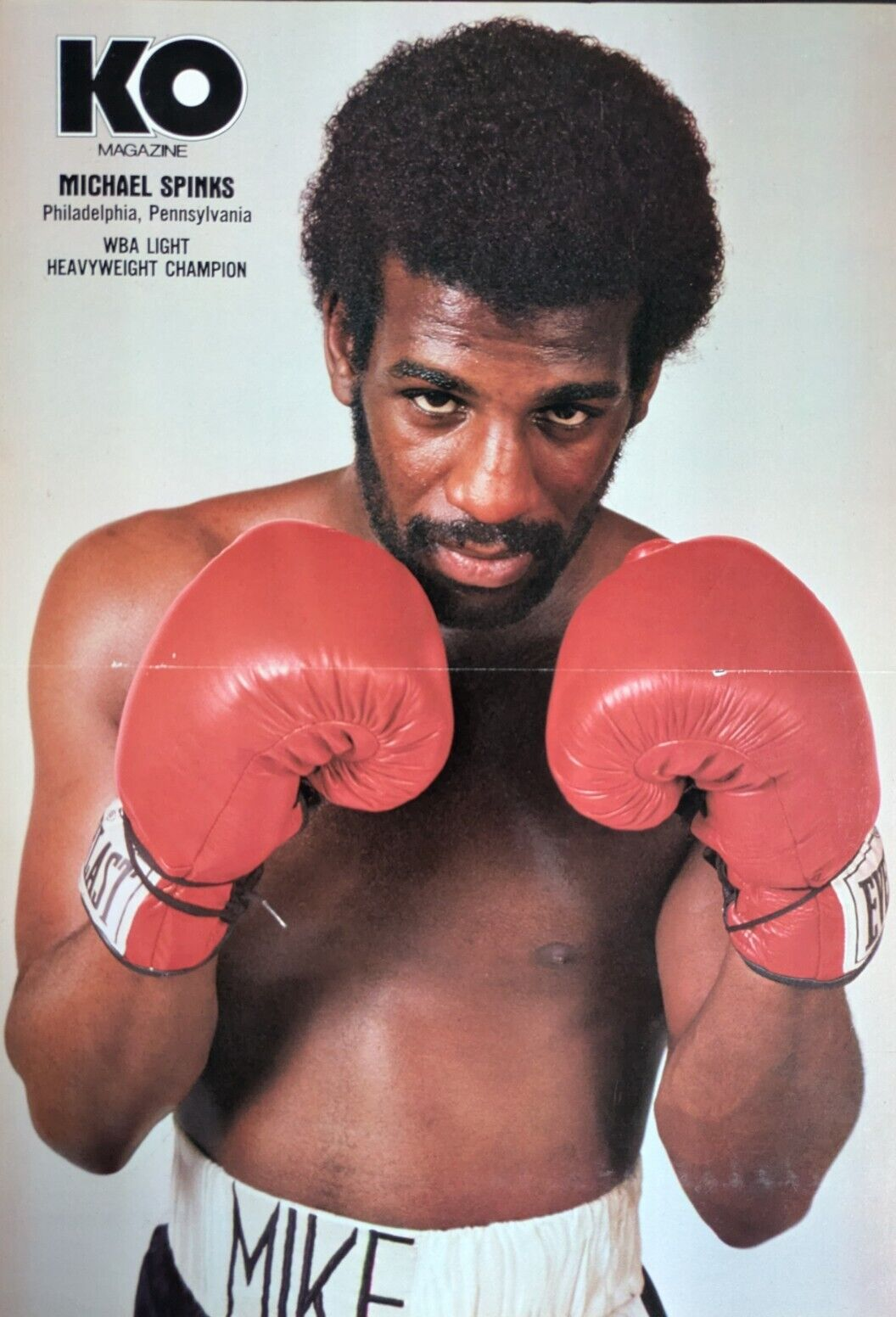
Going into the fight, Mike Tyson (left, shown in 1987) held the WBA, WBC, and IBF world heavyweight titles, while Michael Spinks (right, c. 1982) was The Ring and lineal champion.

Interest in a showdown between Tyson and Spinks grew to settle the issue of who the real champion was, but negotiations were protracted because Tyson's co-managers Bill Cayton and Jimmy Jacobs and Spinks' manager Butch Lewis struggled to agree on terms. Negotiations temporarily broke down when Lewis insisted on a $15 million guarantee for his fighter. Annoyed at constantly being asked about the fight, Tyson eventually demanded that his managers reach an agreement with Lewis.

Trump in a 1988 commercial promoting the fight

By April an agreement had been reached, although another problem arose when the IBF threatened to strip Tyson of their title if the fight was not scheduled for 15 rounds. IBF president Bob Lee then relented, not wanting his organisation to be absent from the biggest fight of the year, and agreed to a 12-round limit. Donald Trump bid a record site fee of $11 million to stage the fight at the Atlantic City Convention Hall, adjacent to his own Trump Plaza. Tyson would earn between $18 million and $22 million depending on fight revenues, the highest purse received by a boxer until James 'Buster' Douglas made $25 million for fighting Evander Holyfield in 1990. Spinks earned a flat $13.5 million, more than all his other fight purses combined.

Billed as "Once and for All", the fight was highly anticipated and earned comparisons with the 1971 Fight of the Century between Joe Frazier and Muhammad Ali, who were also undefeated heavyweight champions when they met to decide the undisputed title. Reports of Tyson's chaotic personal life also increased interest in the bout. In the days leading up to the fight, one or both men featured on the cover of TIME, People, Sports Illustrated and Ring Magazine. Celebrities such as Jack Nicholson, Sylvester Stallone, Sean Penn, Madonna, Warren Beatty, Oprah Winfrey, Billy Crystal, George Steinbrenner, Carl Weathers, Jesse Jackson and Chuck Norris would all be in attendance. A ringside ticket would cost a record $1,500 (equivalent to $4,083 in 2025). Co-promoter Shelly Finkel predicted that the bout would surpass Marvin Hagler vs. Sugar Ray Leonard and become the highest grossing fight in boxing history.

The bout represented a contrast of styles, with Tyson's "speed and devastating power" up against "the unorthodox style of Spinks... who rarely looks impressive but has always found a way to win." Opinions on the fight were mixed, although in general more pundits favored Tyson. Larry Holmes, the only man to have faced both fighters, predicted a Tyson win by knockout in "two to three rounds". Former world champions Jake LaMotta and Billy Conn and trainers Gil Clancy, Angelo Dundee and Richie Giachetti all picked Tyson to win by knockout, as did Gerry Cooney and Dan Duva. Ray Arcel thought Tyson would win on points. IBF middleweight champion Frank Tate gave Tyson the edge, while trainer Lou Duva felt that Tyson would ultimately have too much power for Spinks. James Smith, who had lost a decision to Tyson the previous year, said that for Spinks to win he would "need to take me in the ring with him." Emmanuel Steward's prediction was "Tyson, Tyson, Tyson." Another former heavyweight champion, George Foreman, also predicted a Tyson win.

Muhammad Ali thought Spinks would win, as "he hits hard enough, he'll stick and move, he's fast on his feet, and he'll keep his distance." Tony Zale and sportswriter Bert Sugar backed Spinks to out-box Tyson. Dave Anderson of The New York Times wrote that Spinks would win, "probably in a 12-round decision. But possibly in a late-round knockout." Reigning WBA welterweight champion Marlon Starling, veteran announcer Don Dunphy and Tyson's former trainer Teddy Atlas also favoured Spinks. Contender Meldrick Taylor felt Tyson would win if it ended in a knockout, but favoured Spinks if it went the distance. 1940s middleweight champion Rocky Graziano predicted Spinks would "psych out Tyson, then knock the hell out of him." Archie Moore gave Spinks "a wonderful chance" of winning. Sugar Ray Leonard gave Spinks genuine chances to outpoint Tyson. Floyd Patterson, who like Tyson had been trained by Cus D'Amato, said "I originally picked him [Tyson], and I still do, but now I give Spinks a chance." Spinks entered the ring as a 4–1 underdog.

Predictions and prognosis
| Observer | Occupation | Winner | Method |
|---|---|---|---|
| Muhammad Ali | former heavyweight champion | Spinks | |
| Dave Anderson | sportswriter, New York Times | Spinks | Probably points, possibly KO |
| Gil Clancy | boxing trainer and analyst, CBS Sports | Tyson | KO "early" |
| Angelo Dundee | trainer | Tyson | KO 1 |
| Don Dunphy | sportscaster | Spinks | |
| Richie Giachetti | trainer | Tyson | KO 5 |
| Bob Goodman | vice president, Matchmaker - MSG | Tyson | KO 5 |
| Randy Gordon | boxing analyst, MSG Network | Tyson | KO 2 |
| Jack Fiske | sportswriter, San Francisco Chronicle | Tyson | KO 6 |
| Larry Holmes | ex-heavyweight champion | Tyson | KO "few rounds" |
| Michael Katz | sportswriter, New York Daily News | Tyson | KO "very quickly" |
| George Kimball | sportswriter, Boston Globe | Tyson | KO 5 |
| Sal Marchiano | boxing analyst, WNBC-TV | Tyson | KO |
| Mike Marley | sportswriter, NY Post | Tyson | KO 7 |
| Wallace Matthews | sportswriter, Newsday | Spinks | TKO 10...11 |
| Larry Merchant | boxing analyst, HBO Sports | Tyson | KO "early" |
| Ferdie Pacheco | boxing analyst, NBC Sports | Tyson | KO 6 |
| Dave Raffo | sportswriter, UPI | Tyson | KO 5 |
| Ed Schuyler | sportswriter, Associated Press | Tyson | KO 4 |
| Dave Sims | sportscaster, SportsNight, SNC | Tyson | KO 6 |
| Marlon Starling | WBA welterweight champion | Spinks | |
| Bert Sugar | editor, Boxing Illustrated | Spinks | decision |
| Sugar Ray Leonard | ex-middleweight champion | Spinks | decision |

== The fight ==
Minutes before the fighters were due to enter the ring, there was a commotion in Tyson's dressing room when Butch Lewis noticed a bump in Tyson's gloves and demanded his hands be re-wrapped. The commotion continued with Lewis insistent that he would not let the fight start until the bump was smoothed out. The matter was only resolved when Spinks' trainer Eddie Futch was called in, and he accepted that Tyson's gloves were fine. Though he was trying to protect his fighter's interests, Lewis later admitted that he had also seen a chance to "pull a little psyche" on Tyson. Instead, Tyson had just been angered by the delay. When Lewis had left and Tyson once again prepared to leave his dressing room, he told his trainer Kevin Rooney: "you know, I'm gonna hurt this guy."

Tyson attacked Spinks from the opening bell, landing a solid left hook in the first ten seconds and forcing Spinks to cover up. Spinks clinched and was driven back to the ropes by another Tyson attack. He moved off the ropes but Tyson trapped him again; a left uppercut and a right hand to the body forced Spinks to take a knee after a minute, which marked the second time Spinks had been knocked down in his professional career since a controversial ruled knockdown against Dwight Muhammad Qawi during the eighth round of their 1983 encounter. Spinks took a count of four before rising. As the two men moved towards each other Tyson turned away from a Spinks right hand and responded with a left-right combination to the head which put Spinks down again. This time he was unable to rise and referee Frank Cappuccino counted him out. The fight was over after 91 seconds, presently the sixth shortest heavyweight title fight in history. Just ten punches were landed, eight by Tyson, two by Spinks. The round was named round of the year for 1988 by Ring Magazine.

Afterwards Spinks said: "I came to fight like I said I would. I just tried to do what I knew I had to do, and that was fight. Not that I stood toe to toe with him, but I tried to take the shot and I came up short." Futch opined that Spinks was undone because he abandoned his gameplan of boxing and moving early on and instead tried to win Tyson's respect. Spinks later conceded that "fear was knocking at my door big time." Tyson said "The first punch I threw, he wobbled a bit. I knew right there I had him," adding "my trainer told me before the fight that he bet both our purses that I would knock him out in the first round. So I went out and knocked him out in the first round. And later I found out he was fooling." Tyson dedicated the win to Jimmy Jacobs, who had died in March.

== Aftermath ==
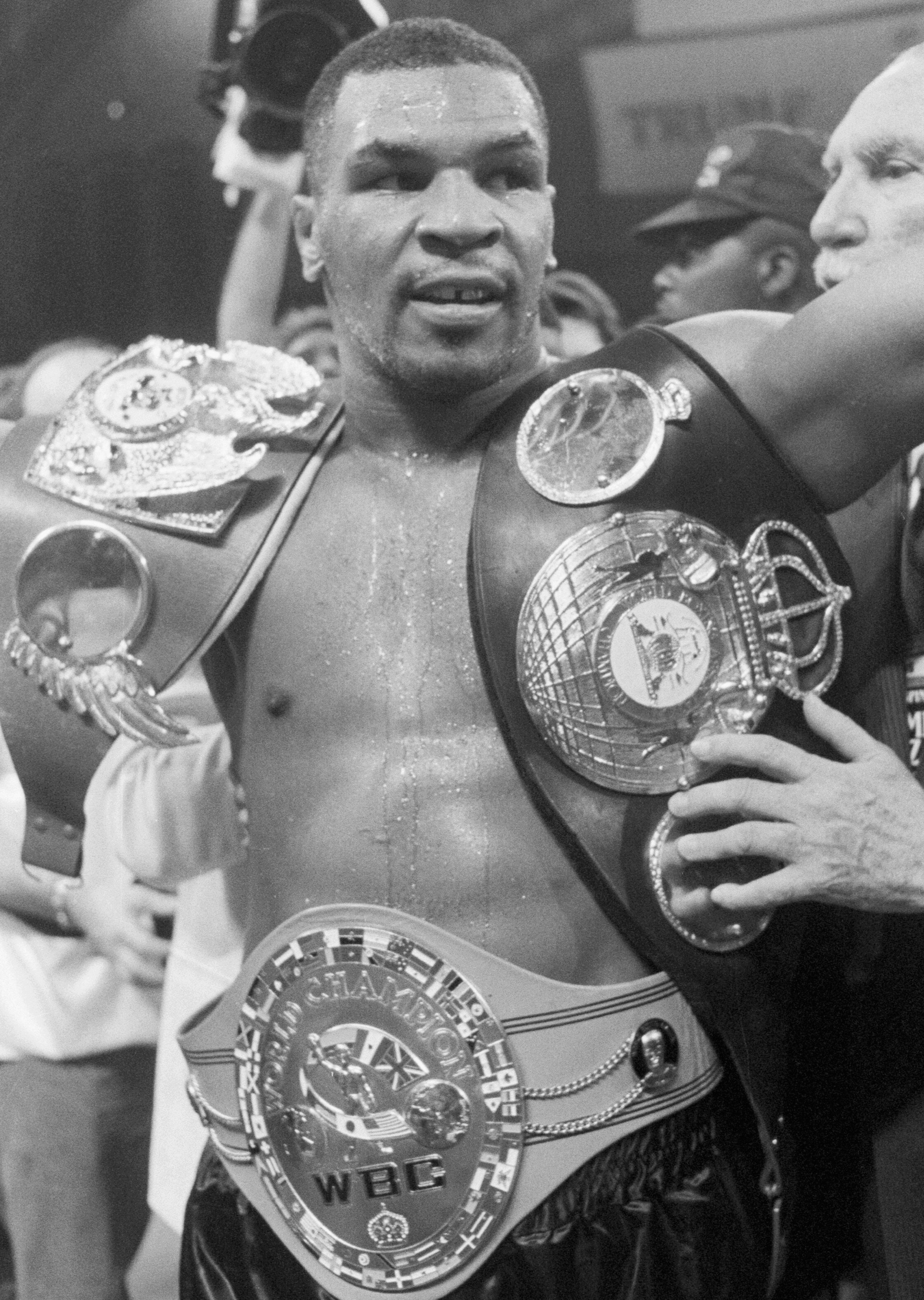
Tyson after the fight

Tyson vs. Spinks was the richest fight in boxing history up to that point, grossing around $70 million, $10 million more than the previous record holder, the Marvin Hagler vs. Sugar Ray Leonard bout in 1987. $12.3 million came from the 21,785 live gate, almost double the previous live gate record of $6.8 million set by Hagler vs. Leonard. 700,000 households bought the fight on pay-per-view television, generating $21 million. A further 800,000 tickets were sold at closed-circuit theatre TV venues, generating $32 million.

The fight also surpassed the 1987 Super Bowl as the highest-grossing single day sporting event in history. It is estimated to have generated $344 million in gambling revenues in Atlantic City, over $100 million more than a typical four-day weekend in June. The Trump Plaza casino achieved a record drop of $11.5 million on the day of the fight.

Spinks never boxed again and announced his retirement from the sport a month later. The Tyson fight was the only loss of his professional career. Tyson also spoke of retiring, hinting that "this may be my last fight." The win over Spinks has been described as the pinnacle of Tyson's boxing career. It was also his last fight under longtime trainer Kevin Rooney, who was dismissed by Tyson in December. Tyson made two more successful title defences before losing to James 'Buster' Douglas in a major upset in 1990. He continued fighting until 2005, but was unable to replicate his earlier achievements. Tyson and Spinks have both been inducted into the International Boxing Hall of Fame and the World Boxing Hall of Fame.

== Undercard ==
Confirmed bouts:

| Winner | Result | Opponent |
|---|---|---|
| (United States) Carl Williams | UD12 | (Canada) Trevor Berbick |
| (United States) James Douglas | TKO7 | (United States) Mike Williams |
| (United States) Maurice Blocker | TKO5 | (Venezuela) Orlando Orozco |
| (Canada) Donovan Ruddock | TKO2 | (United States) Reggie Gross |
| (United States) Glenn Thomas | MD8 | (Canada) John Herbert |
| (United States) Jerry Jones | TKO3 | (United States) Bill Melsop |
| (Puerto Rico) Rodolfo Marin | UD4 | (United States) Bruce Johnson |
| (United States) Anthony Witherspoon | TKO5 | (United States) Alex Stanley |

== Broadcasting ==
| Country | Broadcaster |
|---|---|
| Philippines | GMA Network |
| Puerto Rico | WAPA-TV |
| United Kingdom | ITV |
| United States | HBO |
| Thailand | Channel 7 |

| Preceded by vs. Tony Tubbs | Mike Tyson's bouts June 27, 1988 | Succeeded by vs. Frank Bruno |
| Preceded by vs. Gerry Cooney | Michael Spinks' bouts June 27, 1988 | Retired |
Awards
| Previous: Kelvin Seabrooks vs. Thierry Jacob; Round 1 | The Ring Magazine Round of the Year; Round 1; 1988 | Next: Lupe Gutierrez vs Jeff Franklin; Round 12 |
