= Michael Spinks vs. Gerry Cooney =

Boxing match

The War at the Shore
- Date: June 15, 1987
- Venue: Convention Hall, Atlantic City, New Jersey, U.S.
- Title(s) on the line: The Ring heavyweight title

Tale of the tape
| Boxer | Michael Spinks | Gerry Cooney |
| Nickname | Jinx | Gentleman |
| Hometown | St. Louis, Missouri, U.S. | Huntington, New York, U.S. |
| Purse | $4,000,000 | $2,500,000 |
| Pre-fight record | 30–0 (20 KO) | 28–1 (24 KO) |
| Age | 30 years, 10 months | 30 years, 9 months |
| Height | 6 ft 2 1/2 in (189 cm) | 6 ft 6 in (198 cm) |
| Weight | 208 3/4 lb (95 kg) | 238 lb (108 kg) |
| Style | Orthodox | Orthodox |
| Recognition | The Ring; Heavyweight Champion; WBC; No. 5 Ranked Heavyweight; 2-division world champion | WBC; No. 10 Ranked Heavyweight |

Result
- Spinks wins via 5th-round technical knockout

Michael Spinks vs. Gerry Cooney, billed as The War at the Shore, was a professional boxing match contested on June 15, 1987, for The Ring heavyweight title.

== Background ==
A Michael Spinks–Gerry Cooney fight had long been in the works dating back to January 1986. Spinks' promoter Butch Lewis had been talks with Cooney and his team about Spinks possibly making his first defense against Cooney after his heavyweight title win against Larry Holmes the previous September. These talks stalled when Lewis joined forces with Don King to create the heavyweight unification series after which Spinks was entered into the series with a rematch against Holmes being named as his first fight in the series. Cooney, after failing to defeat Larry Holmes for the WBC heavyweight title in 1982, had fought extremely sparingly since. Following a 16-month layoff after returning to boxing in late 1984 following a 13-month layoff, Cooney was matched up against fringe contender Eddie Gregg on May 31, 1986, with the winner expected to challenge Spinks, who held the IBF heavyweight title and was recognized as the lineal heavyweight champion. After knocking out Gregg in the first round of their fight, Cooney hoped to begin negotiations with Spinks, whom had successfully made the first defense of his title the previous month in a rematch with Holmes. However, Spinks pivoted and instead chose to make his next defense against the IBF's #12 ranked contender Steffen Tangstad, whom he defeated on September 6, 1986.

Lewis and Spinks then once again entered into talks with Cooney and his manager Dennis Rapaport, with a deal eventually agreed to in early December. The deal was met with controversy as it was to take place outside of the unification series Spinks was obligated to compete in as IBF heavyweight champion. HBO, who held the American broadcast rights for the series, took the matter to court in hopes of blocking the fight and was successful in doing so when a New York judge granted an injunction that stated that Cooney could not fight Spinks for the IBF title unless he signed on to join the unification series. In response, Lewis, hoping to get around the court order, filed an appeal, stating he intended "to go the whole 15 rounds because I'm right." In February 1987, after months of legal proceedings, the IBF ordered Spinks to return to the unification series and face their top contender Tony Tucker, though doing so would've only netted Spinks around $400,000, a drastic departure from the millions he was expected to earn in the Cooney fight. When Spinks refused the Tucker fight, the IBF officially stripped him of their title on February 26, 1987, and he was subsequently removed from the unification series, with Tucker now pitted against Buster Douglas for the vacant title, though Spinks still held claim to the lineal heavyweight title and held The Ring magazines heavyweight title. Lewis derided the IBF's decision "I don't care if it's the WBA, WBC, IBF, XYZ, people don't buy the alphabets." and announced his intent to still pursue both the Cooney fight and a fight with then WBA and WBC champion Mike Tyson afterwards. As Spinks and Cooney could still not legally face each other, Spinks' legal team returned to court in early March in hopes of getting the injunction lifted. On March 19, a judge lifted the injunction, finally paving a way for the long waited fight to be announced, which was made official a week later. Despite his long periods of inactivity and having fought less than 90 seconds in a 30-month span, Cooney nevertheless came into the fight as an 8–5 favorite.

== The fight ==
Spinks started off aggressively, furiously attacking Cooney during the first two rounds. Cooney rebounded in the third, opening a cut above Spinks' eye and then kept Spinks on the retreat in the fourth. Spinks then put on a dominating effort in the fifth, dropping Cooney midway through the round after lading several unanswered punches to Cooney's head. Cooney got up at the count of five and continued the fight, but Spinks quickly went back on the attack and again sent Cooney down again only seconds later, though Cooney got back up at the count of seven. Spinks continued to pummel a clearly hurt and almost defenseless Cooney. Before Spinks could send Cooney down a third time, referee Frank Cappuccino stepped in and stopped the fight with nine seconds left in the round, giving Spinks the victory by technical knockout.

== Aftermath ==
After his victory interest in a showdown with Tyson increased, but negotiations were protracted because Tyson's co-managers Bill Cayton and Jimmy Jacobs and Spinks' manager Butch Lewis struggled to agree on terms. Negotiations temporarily broke down when Lewis insisted on a $15 million guarantee for his fighter. Annoyed at constantly being asked about the fight, Tyson eventually demanded that his managers reach an agreement with Lewis.

== Fight card ==
Confirmed bouts:

| Weight Class | Weight | | vs. | | Method | Round | Notes |
|---|---|---|---|---|---|---|---|
| Heavyweight | 200+ lbs. | Michael Spinks (c) | def | Gerry Cooney | TKO | 5/15 | ^{Note 1} |
| Super Lightweight | 140 lbs. | Livingstone Bramble | def. | John Kalbhenn | TKO | 5/10 |
| Heavyweight | 200+ lbs. | Donovan Ruddock | def. | Carlos Hernandez | DQ | 7/10 |
| Heavyweight | 200+ lbs. | Elijah Tillery | def. | Dorcey Gaymon | UD | 8/8 |
| Middleweight | 160 lbs. | Glenn Thomas | def. | Kenny Butler | TKO | 6/8 |
| Heavyweight | 200+ lbs. | Pete Ludwinski | def. | Barry Forbes | KO | 2/4 |

^Note 1 For The Ring and lineal heavyweight titles

== Broadcasting ==
| Country | Broadcaster |
|---|---|
| Philippines | GMA Network |
| United Kingdom | ITV |
| United States | ABC |

| Preceded by vs. Steffen Tangstad | Michael Spinks's bouts 15 June 1987 | Succeeded by vs. Mike Tyson |
| Preceded by vs. Eddie Gregg | Gerry Cooney's bouts 15 June 1987 | Succeeded by vs. George Foreman |
