= Michael Spinks vs. Steffen Tangstad =

Boxing match

- Date: September 6, 1986
- Venue: Las Vegas Hilton, Winchester, Nevada, U.S.
- Title(s) on the line: IBF and The Ring heavyweight titles

Tale of the tape
Boxer	Michael Spinks	Steffen Tangstad
Nickname	Jinx	
Hometown	St. Louis, Missouri, U.S.	Tønsberg, Norway
Purse	$1,000,000	$50,000
Pre-fight record	29–0 (19 KO)	24–1–2 (14 KO)
Age	30 years, 1 month	27 years, 11 months
Height	6 ft 2 1/2 in (189 cm)	6 ft 2 in (188 cm)
Weight	201 lb (91 kg)	214 3/4 lb (97 kg)
Style	Orthodox	Orthodox
Recognition	IBF and The Ring; Heavyweight Champion	IBF; No. 12 Ranked Heavyweight; EBU heavyweight champion

Result
- Spinks wins via 4th-round technical knockout

Michael Spinks vs. Steffen Tangstad was a professional boxing match contested on September 6, 1986, for the IBF, The Ring and lineal heavyweight titles.

== Background ==
Michael Spinks, in his first fight in the Don King and Butch Lewis-promoted heavyweight unification series, made the first successful defense of his IBF heavyweight title on April 19, 1986, by scoring a split decision victory over Larry Holmes, whom he had previously defeated the previous September to capture the title, in an IBF-mandated rematch rematch. Following his win over Holmes, Spinks entered talks to face former heavyweight title challenger Gerry Cooney, who was coming off a victory over contender Eddie Gregg that got him back him into contention, but Spinks bypassed Cooney in favor of a fight with Steffen Tangstad, the European heavyweight champion. As Spinks had already made his mandatory defense against Holmes, Spinks had the choice to make an optional defense against any of the IBF's top 12 contenders and chose the number-12th ranked Tangstad rather than face Cooney, who was ranked 10th, after a disagreement between Spinks' promoter Lewis and Cooney's manager Dennis Rapaport over the split of the purse.

Tangstad, who was a virtually unknown in the United States and was a sizeable 7–1 underdog going into the fight, was given little to no chance of even competing with Spinks and his selection as an opponent for the heavyweight champion was met with derision with boxing commentator Al Bernstein going as far as saying everything Tangstad did was "totally slow motion." Spinks and Lewis were criticized for picking a safe opponent that Spinks would have an easy time defeating en route to advancing to the finals of the unification series. Responding to the criticism, Spinks stated "I think you have all underrated Steffen. He's a good fighter. I'm gonna respect the guy just like any other opponent." though he admitted "It would feel good to have a short night."

The Spinks–Tangstad main event was supplemented with a Bobby Czyz–Slobodan Kačar IBF light heavyweight title bout, in which Czyz would win his first of two world titles by knocking out Slobodan Kačar in the fifth round. Also on the undercard, Mike Tyson knocked out Alfonso Ratliff in the second round in what was his final fight before entering the heavyweight unification series and challenging Trevor Berbick for the WBC heavyweight title.

== The fight ==
After a close first round, with Tangstad taking the round on two of the judge's scorecards, Spinks took control in and had little trouble with Tangstad through the rest of the fight. With just over a minute left in the third round, Spinks sent Tangstad down for the first time with two left jabs followed by a big right hand, though Tangstad was up quickly and he and Spinks continued to trade punches until the round ended. Early in the fourth, Spinks dropped Tangstad again with a short left while the two fought in close quarters. Tangstad, though clearly shaken after the knockdown, answered the referee's count at eight and continued the fight, though Spinks almost immediately sent Tangstad down again with another big left. Though Tangstad, now bleeding from the nose, was able to get back up, he informed referee Richard Steele that he did not continue and the fight was stopped, giving Spinks the victory by technical knockout at 58 seconds of the round.

== Aftermath ==
After his victory over Tangstad, Spinks controversially exited the heavyweight unification series and instead agreed to face Gerry Cooney. HBO, who held the rights to broadcast the series and had expected Spinks to participate as long as he held the IBF title, went to court and a judge granted an injunction that legally prohibited Spinks and Cooney from fighting outside the unification series. After a several month-long legal battle, a judge lifted the injunction in March 1987 and Spinks finally met Cooney in June of that year, knocking him out in the fifth round.

As a result of his loss, Tangstad was suspended by the European Boxing Union for 60 days, which prevented him making a scheduled defense of his EBU title against Andre van den Oetlaar and he subsequently stripped of the title as a result. Though he stated at the time that he was "through with fighting for the European title." and claimed that "all I want now is to face an American world champion again", he never fought professionally again.

== Fight card ==
Confirmed bouts:

Weight Class	Weight		vs.		Method	Round	Notes
Heavyweight	200+ lbs.	Michael Spinks (c)	def	Steffen Tangstad	TKO	4/15	^{Note 1}
Light Heavyweight	175 lbs.	Bobby Czyz	def.	Slobodan Kačar (c)	TKO	5/15	^{Note 2}
Heavyweight	200+ lbs.	James Douglas	def.	Dee Collier	UD	10/10
Heavyweight	200+ lbs.	Mike Tyson	def.	Alfonso Ratliff	TKO	2/10
Super Welterweight	154 lbs.	Glenn Thomas	def.	Bruce Sewell	KO	1/6
Heavyweight	200+ lbs.	Terry Davis	def.	Bruce Johnson	TKO	3/5
Heavyweight	200+ lbs.	Alex Stewart	def.	James Warren Walker	TKO	3/4

^Note 1 For IBF, The Ring and lineal heavyweight titles
^Note 2 For IBF light heavyweight title

== Broadcasting ==
Country	Broadcaster
United Kingdom	ITV
United States	HBO

Preceded by vs. Larry Holmes II	Michael Spinks's bouts 6 September 1986	Succeeded by vs. Gerry Cooney
Preceded by vs. John Westgarth	Steffen Tangstad's bouts 6 September 1986	Retired
