= Mike Tyson vs. Tony Tubbs =

Boxing competition

- Date: March 21, 1988
- Venue: Tokyo Dome, Tokyo, Japan
- Title(s) on the line: WBA, WBC, and IBF heavyweight titles

Tale of the tape
Boxer	(United States) Mike Tyson	(United States) Tony Tubbs
Nickname	"Iron"	"TNT"
Hometown	Catskill, New York, US	Cincinnati, Ohio, US
Purse	$10,000,000	$500,000
Pre-fight record	33–0 (29 KO)	24–1 (16 KO)
Age	21 years, 8 months	30 years, 1 month
Height	5 ft 10 in (178 cm)	6 ft 3 in (191 cm)
Weight	216 1/4 lb (98 kg)	238 1/4 lb (108 kg)
Style	Orthodox	Orthodox
Recognition	WBA, WBC and IBF; Heavyweight Champion; The Ring; No. 1 Ranked Heavyweight	WBA/WBC/IBF; No. 2 Ranked Heavyweight

Result
- Tyson wins via 2nd-round TKO

Mike Tyson vs. Tony Tubbs was a professional boxing match contested on March 21, 1988 for the WBA, WBC, and IBF heavyweight championships.

== Background ==
Tyson was only two months removed from an impressive victory over ex-Heavyweight champion Larry Holmes. Shortly after his victory, Tyson's promoter Don King was able to work out a blockbuster deal with Michael Spinks and Spinks' promoter Butch Lewis that would see Spinks finally meet Tyson for the Undisputed Championship. Before that fight would happen, however, Tyson would first have to defend his titles against former WBA Heavyweight champion Tony Tubbs in Tokyo, Japan for his first ever title defense outside of the United States.

Much was made about the weight of Tony Tubbs. The Japanese promoters had offered Tubbs an additional $50,000 had he weighed less than 235 and Tubbs himself claimed he would come into the fight at 230 pounds, however it was revealed at the final weigh-in that he in fact weighed 238 pounds. It was revealed before the fight that Tubbs had a falling out with his trainer Richie Giachetti, who had been recommended to Tubbs by Tyson's previous opponent, Larry Holmes. Giachetti would claim lack of motivation on Tubbs' part, stating "I tried to kick him in the ass, get him in shape, and Tony didn't like that. It's a shame. The guy has real ability, but I don't think he's in good shape." Despite his weight issues, Tubbs remained confident that he could pull off the upset and defeat Tyson, stating "A lot of guys who've lost to him have made the mistake of getting caught up in his kind of fight, and I won't let him suck me up into his kind of fight. I won't let him do that. I'm going to make him box. He's never faced a guy with my hand speed."

== Fight ==
The two fighters fought a close 1st round. Tubbs was able to land several jabs and avoid Tyson's power punches. At the end of the round, one judge ruled in favor of Tubbs 10–9, another gave the round to Tyson 10–9, and the third awarded a draw 10–10. At the beginning of 2nd round, Tubbs again fought Tyson well, being able to land several punches within the first two minutes of the round. However, with 30 seconds left in round 2, Tyson landed a right body shot–right uppercut combination as Tubbs was against the ropes. Tubbs, clearly hurt from the exchange, staggered towards Tyson. Just exactly as the HBO expert Sugar Ray Leonard, commenting the fight, said that Tubbs gained respect of his punches from Tyson, a solid left hook thrown by Tyson landed to the side of Tubbs' head, staggering him very badly. Tubbs immediately clinched Tyson to recover. Referee Arthur Mercante Sr. then separated the two men, Tyson continued with his devastating barrage, leading Tubbs to clinch him again. Mercante again separated them, and as Leonard continued with the words "I couldn't tell that this punch hurt..." Tubbs received another blockbusting left hook to the head, stumped a few steps back with his knees wobbling side-to-side and went down to the canvas permanently with 15 seconds left in the round. Almost immediately afterwards, Tubbs' trainer Odell Hadley jumped into the ring, causing Mercante to stop the fight at 2:54 and award Tyson the victory via technical knockout.

== Aftermath ==
Next up for Tyson would be his highly anticipated bout against Lineal Heavyweight champion Michael Spinks. Despite months of heavy buildup with two undefeated Heavyweight champions going up against one another, the fight did not last long, with Tyson knocking out Spinks within 91 seconds. After this Tyson would take an eight-month layoff before returning in February to face England's Frank Bruno, defeating him via 5th round technical knockout. After another successful defense against Carl Williams, Tyson would return to the Tokyo Dome to face little-known James "Buster" Douglas in what was supposed to be another easy fight for Tyson before he would face Evander Holyfield. However, Douglas would pull off the shocking upset, defeating Tyson by 10th round knockout.

== Undercard ==
Confirmed bouts:

== Broadcasting ==
Country	Broadcaster	Color commentator	Play by Play Announcer	Analyst	Champion Interviewer
Italy	Italia 1		Rino Tommasi		None
Japan	Nippon TV	Kazuo Tokumitsu, Hiroko Yakushimaru, Shigeo Nagashima	Toshimi Ashizawa	Joe koizumi, Fighting Harada	Masashi Funakoshi
Philippines	GMA Network		Joe Cantada		
Spain	TVE				None
United Kingdom	ITV		Reg Gutteridge		None
United States	HBO	None	Larry Merchant, Jim Lampley	Sugar Ray Leonard	Larry Merchant

Preceded by vs. Larry Holmes	Mike Tyson's bouts March 21, 1988	Succeeded by vs. Michael Spinks
Preceded by vs. Eddie Gonzales	Tony Tubbs's bouts March 21, 1988	Succeeded by vs. Mike Jameson
