= Larry Holmes vs. Michael Spinks =

Boxing match

History: A September to Remember
- Date: September 21, 1985
- Venue: Riviera Hotel & Casino, Winchester, Nevada, U.S.
- Title(s) on the line: IBF, The Ring and Lineal heavyweight titles

Tale of the tape
Boxer	Larry Holmes	Michael Spinks
Nickname	The Easton Assassin	Jinx
Hometown	Easton, Pennsylvania, U.S.	St. Louis, Missouri, U.S.
Purse	$3,000,000	$900,000
Pre-fight record	48–0 (34 KO)	27–0 (19 KO)
Age	35 years, 10 months	29 years, 2 months
Height	6 ft 3 in (191 cm)	6 ft 2 1/2 in (189 cm)
Weight	221 1/2 lb (100 kg)	200 lb (91 kg)
Style	Orthodox	Orthodox
Recognition	IBF, The Ring and Lineal; Heavyweight Champion	WBA, WBC, IBF, The Ring and Lineal Undisputed; Light Heavyweight Champion

Result
- Spinks defeated Holmes by Unanimous Decision

Larry Holmes vs. Michael Spinks, billed as History: A September to Remember, was a professional boxing match contested on September 21, 1985, for the IBF, The Ring and Lineal heavyweight championship.

== Background ==
=== The champion ===
Holmes entered the fight having reigned as heavyweight champion since he won the World Boxing Council championship by defeating Ken Norton in June 1978 after reigning champion Leon Spinks, Michael's older brother, was stripped of the title for pursuing a rematch with Muhammad Ali instead of making a mandatory defense against Norton. In 1980, after making a successful defense against Leroy Jones, Holmes also garnered recognition from The Ring as its champion; he later gained recognition as the lineal champion in the same year by knocking out Ali in a one-sided fight. Although Holmes was stripped of the WBC championship for refusing to fight Greg Page in 1983, he was selected by the International Boxing Federation as its inaugural champion shortly thereafter.

After becoming the IBF champion, Holmes successfully defended the title against James "Bonecrusher" Smith, David Bey, and Carl "The Truth" Williams. In the last of those three fights, Holmes won a controversial unanimous decision over Williams, who believed that he had won the fight. Still, Holmes' victory marked his nineteenth consecutive successful world championship defense, and with a win over Spinks he would join Joe Louis as the only other fighter to make twenty or more successful title defenses.

In addition, Holmes' win over Williams was his forty-eighth consecutive bout without a defeat. With a win in this fight, Holmes would tie Rocky Marciano's heavyweight record of winning forty-nine fights without ever being defeated.

=== The challenger ===
Like his brother Leon, Michael Spinks was an Olympic champion at the Montreal Games having won gold as a middleweight. He had also been a two time national Golden Gloves champion, and turned professional the year after his Olympic triumph. He won his first sixteen fights as a professional with eleven knockouts.

In his seventeenth fight, Spinks faced Eddie Mustafa Muhammad for his World Boxing Association light heavyweight championship on July 18, 1981, in Las Vegas. He knocked the champion down once in the fight and won a unanimous decision, taking his first world championship. He then made five defenses of the WBA championship, scoring knockouts in each fight.

In March 1983, Spinks and WBC champion Dwight Muhammad Qawi squared off in a unification match that Spinks won in a close unanimous decision. He then became the first light heavyweight to unify the three major championships when he beat Jerry Davis to win the IBF championship. After a rematch with Qawi failed to materialize due to the former champion suffering an injury, and after two more defenses of his championship, Spinks decided to move up to heavyweight and challenge Holmes.

Spinks had his own chance to make history with a victory. A win would make him and his brother, who Holmes had knocked out in 1983, the first such pairing to be heavyweight world champions. He would also join Bob Fitzsimmons as the only other boxer to win championships at light heavyweight and heavyweight, and would be the first reigning light heavyweight champion to become heavyweight champion. In addition, he would become the latest fighter to win both an Olympic championship and the world heavyweight championship, joining Floyd Patterson (middleweight, 1952), Ali (light heavyweight, 1960), Joe Frazier (heavyweight, 1964), George Foreman (heavyweight, 1968), and brother Leon (light heavyweight, 1976).

=== Leading up to the fight ===
Veteran trainer Eddie Futch, who had trained both fighters since 1981, opted to sit out the bout rather be in the corner of one or the other of them. As a result, Holmes brought back former trainer Richie Giachetti, while Spinks' assistant trainer Nelson Brison led his team.

Despite many boxing experts expecting Spinks to face a near 50 pound weight disparity against the champion, at the weigh-in he came in at 200 pounds, a mere 21½ Ib difference.

== The fight ==
During the first two rounds Holmes was able to control the pace using his jab. As the bout went on, Spinks was able to use unpredictable movement to throw flurries of punches from unexpected angles which scored points but never troubled the champion. By the last few rounds, pattern had formed, with Holmes coming forward, loading up, scoring with hard punches but never landing anything that looked like hurting Spinks. Spinks using movement to fight on the back foot, landing the odd flurry, before moving out of range.

After 15 rounds, Lawrence Wallace scored it 145–142 while Harold Lederman and Dave Moretti had it 143–142, all three scoring the victory for Spinks to fulfill his historical destiny and join his brother as a world heavyweight champion. While the judges at ringside scored the fight for the light heavyweight champion, some felt that Holmes won the fight; for example, the Associated Press scored it 144–141 for the now-former champion while United Press International had it 146–141 for Holmes.

== Aftermath ==
Speaking in the post fight press conference when asked about missing the chance to tie Rocky Marciano's record Holmes said "I'm 35 fighting young men and Rocky was 25 fighting old men. To be technical, Rocky couldn't carry my jockstrap." The comment would cause some controversy and Holmes subsequently apologized.

In his 1998 autobiography Against The Odds, Holmes would recount that after suffering a pinched nerve in training, a nerve specialist told him that he had a slipped disc in his fifth vertebra and that he might be paralyzed for life any time I threw a punch with a right hand. This would be contradicted by other doctors who said that chance that he would get paralyzed were "practically nil." Nevertheless, Holmes said that the specialist's comments affected his performance, "I found that not only was I flat and listless, I was reluctant to pull the trigger on the right hand."

The two would have a rematch in April 1986, again in Las Vegas. Spinks would win again, this time by split decision, while Holmes would decide to retire after the fight. Spinks would continue as IBF champion until February 1987, when the organization stripped him of the championship for taking a fight with Gerry Cooney instead of facing top contender Tony Tucker in the ongoing series of fights to unify the division. He remained recognized as the lineal champion until June 1988, when the winner of the unification series, Mike Tyson, knocked him out in the first round of their fight; Spinks never fought again after this.

Holmes initially retired after this fight but would return to fighting twice; after suffering a knockout in 1988 against Tyson in a one-off title contest, Holmes resumed his full-time career in 1991 and fought three more times for a championship. He would lose a 1992 fight for the undisputed championship to Evander Holyfield, a 1995 fight for the WBC championship to Oliver McCall, and a 1997 fight for the International Boxing Organization championship against Brian Nielsen before his career ended.

Since Spinks' victory over Holmes, only one other boxer has won a piece of the heavyweight world championship while reigning as the light heavyweight champion, while only one additional boxer has won world championships at both light heavyweight and heavyweight. In 1988, Michael Moorer became the inaugural World Boxing Organization light heavyweight champion; he later would win the WBO, WBA, and lineal heavyweight championships as well as the IBF championship which he won twice. In 2003, undisputed light heavyweight championships Roy Jones Jr. faced and defeated WBA champion John Ruiz in a unanimous decision to join Spinks as the only other reigning light heavyweight champion to win the world heavyweight championship.

== Undercard ==
Confirmed bouts:

Winner	Loser	Weight division/title belt(s) disputed	Result
(Mexico) Julio Cesar Chavez	(United States) Dwight Pratchett	WBC World Super Featherweight Title	Unanimous decision.
Non-TV bouts
(United States) Bernard Benton	(United States) Alfonso Ratliff	WBC World Cruiserweight Title	Unanimous decision.
(United States) Mitchell Julien	(Mexico) Benjamin Quintero	Super Lightweight (10 rounds)	4th-round KO.
(United States) Glenn Thomas	(United States) Ron Morgan	Super Welterweight (6 rounds)	1st-round TKO.
(Mexico) Luciano Solis	(Mexico) Jose Enriquez	Featherweight (6 rounds)	Unanimous decision.
(United States) James Pritchard	(United States) Vince Parker	Heavyweight (4 rounds)	2nd-round TKO.

== Broadcasting ==
Country	Broadcaster
Australia	Nine Network
Canada	Superchannel
Mexico	Televisa
Philippines	MBS 4
United Kingdom	ITV
United States	HBO

Preceded by vs. Carl Williams	Larry Holmes's bouts 21 September 1985	Succeeded by Rematch
Preceded by vs. Jim MacDonald	Michael Spinks's bouts 21 September 1985	Succeeded by Rematch
Awards
Preceded by Johnny Bumphus vs. Gene Hatcher	The Ring Upset of the Year; 1985	Succeeded by Donald Curry vs. Lloyd Honeyghan
