= Mike Tyson vs. Larry Holmes =

Boxing competition

Heavyweight History
- Date: January 22, 1988
- Venue: Trump Plaza, Atlantic City, New Jersey, U.S.
- Title(s) on the line: WBA, WBC, and IBF heavyweight titles

Tale of the tape
Boxer	Mike Tyson	Larry Holmes
Nickname	Iron	The Easton Assassin
Hometown	Catskill, New York, U.S.	Easton, Pennsylvania, U.S.
Purse	$3,000,000	$3,100,000
Pre-fight record	32–0 (28 KO)	48–2 (34 KO)
Age	21 years, 6 months	38 years, 2 months
Height	5 ft 10 in (178 cm)	6 ft 3 in (191 cm)
Weight	215 3/4 lb (98 kg)	225 3/4 lb (102 kg)
Style	Orthodox	Orthodox
Recognition	WBA, WBC and IBF; Heavyweight Champion; The Ring; No. 1 Ranked Heavyweight	Former heavyweight champion

Result
- Tyson wins via 4th-round TKO

Mike Tyson vs. Larry Holmes, billed as Heavyweight History, was a professional boxing match contested on January 22, 1988, for the WBA, WBC, and IBF Heavyweight Championships.

== Background ==
Mike Tyson was entering 1988 having unified the three major world championships over the course of the previous fourteen months. In 1987 Tyson, who entered the year as the WBC champion, defeated James "Bonecrusher" Smith for the WBA championship, knocked out Pinklon Thomas in his first defense of both of those titles, won a decision over Tony Tucker to claim the IBF championship, and knocked out Tyrell Biggs in his first defense of all three titles. Despite this, Tyson had not achieved universal recognition as he had not faced or defeated Michael Spinks; Spinks had been stripped of the IBF championship for pursuing a fight with Gerry Cooney instead of making a mandatory defense versus Tucker, but was still regarded as the lineal champion.

Don King, Tyson's promoter, began working to try to secure a match with Larry Holmes, the former WBC and IBF champion who had not been in the ring since 1986. After starting out his career winning his first 48 fights, Holmes lost a unanimous decision to Spinks, who at the time was the reigning undisputed light heavyweight champion; this resulted in Holmes losing the IBF and lineal championships and ended his world championship reign after seven-plus years. A rematch with Spinks the next year ended with a disputed split decision loss for Holmes, who announced his displeasure with the result after the fight and retired.

However, with an estimated $3 million being offered to him, as well as the intrigue of once again becoming the world heavyweight champion, Holmes ultimately agreed to face Tyson stating, "They stole my title, and I had to come back." According to Holmes and Jim Jacobs, Tyson's manager at the time, the financial terms were negotiated for more than half a year, starting in the spring of 1987. and were finally agreed In October, a few weeks before Tyson's fight vs Tyrell Biggs, The fight was officially announced on October 8, 1987, by Don King in New York and confirmed by Tyson's co-managers Jimmy Jacobs and Bill Clayton.

This fight was considered 'barbershop talk'; with a victory by Tyson assumed to be a legitimate statement in the affirmative as to whether he would have beaten Muhammad Ali during his era, in part since Holmes had openly admitted to patterning his pugilistic style after Ali during his prime. Rumours were abound that Tyson took the fight partially because he wanted to avenge Ali's (who was the guest of honor ringside before the bout) loss to Holmes earlier in the decade. A win by Holmes would have made him, at the time, the fourth fighter to win a world championship at heavyweight after having lost it; he would have joined Floyd Patterson, who accomplished the feat in 1960 by avenging his defeat to Ingemar Johansson, Ali, who did so in 1974 and again in 1978, and Tim Witherspoon, who lost the WBC title in 1984 only to win the WBA title in 1986.

The outspoken Holmes was critical of Tyson, promising several times before the fight that he would knock Tyson out. Immediately after the Tyson–Tyrell Biggs fight, Holmes, who had attended the fight, was interviewed and called Tyson a "dirty fighter" stating "I didn't see a guy with class in there, I see a guy who throws elbows, I see a guy who throws (head)butts and I see a guy who hits after the bell."

== The fight ==
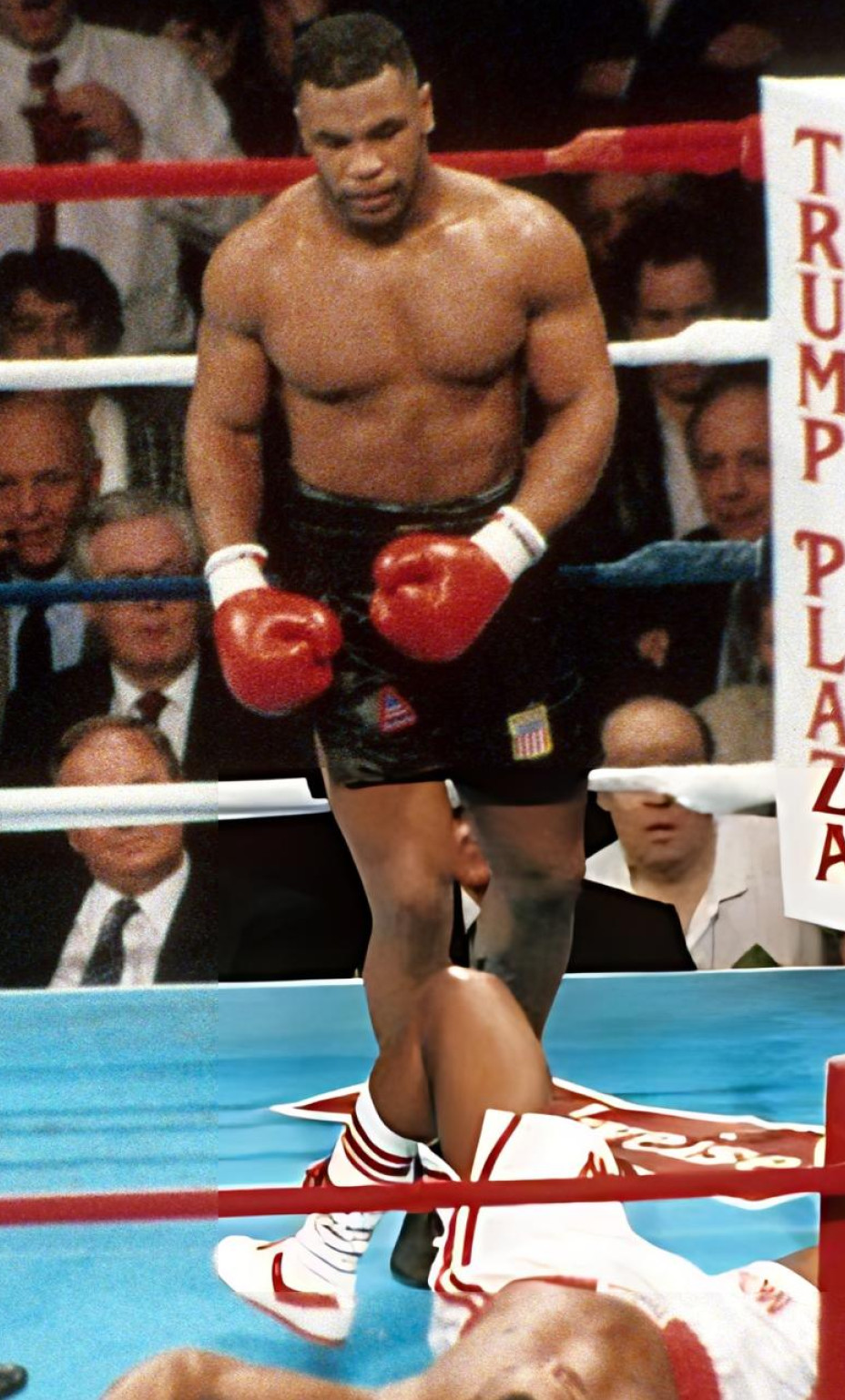
Tyson standing over Holmes

Despite his brazen claims, Holmes had difficulty keeping up with the younger, faster and stronger Tyson. Like many of the fighters who challenged Tyson in the past, Holmes often held Tyson in an effort to slow the aggressive Tyson down. In round 4, Holmes started off well, hitting Tyson several times with his left jab. As the round went on, however, Tyson would continue to attack Holmes, getting him up against the ropes and landing a right hand to the side of Holmes' head a minute into the round. After the exchange, Tyson would continue to be aggressive, causing Holmes to hold Tyson twice more. After referee Joe Cortez broke the second hold, Tyson hit Holmes with a left jab–right hand combination that sent Holmes to the canvas. Holmes was able to get back up but was immediately met with a furious combination from Tyson, who knocked Holmes down for the second time with a right hook to the head. Holmes stumbled back to his feet and was able to answer the referee's count at 8. Tyson would continue to hammer Holmes with powerful combinations until finally delivering the final blow with seven seconds left in the round, a right hook that dropped Holmes for the third time in the round, after which Cortez stopped the fight and awarded Tyson the victory by technical knockout.

== Aftermath ==
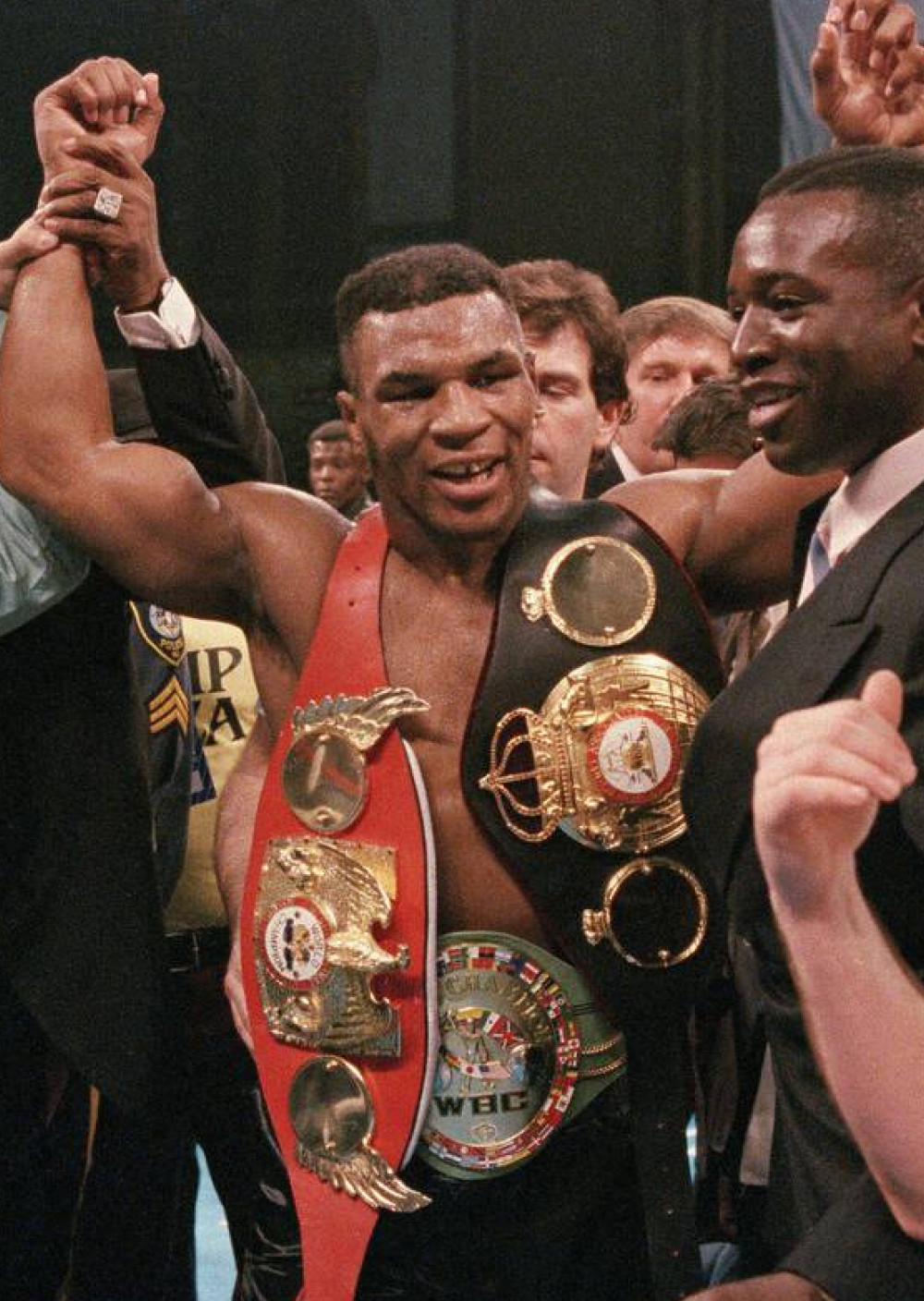
Tyson after the fight

Tyson would begin negotiations with lineal champion Michael Spinks not too long after the fight against Holmes. Both Spinks and his promoter Butch Lewis would attend the Tyson–Holmes fight, hoping to finally come to an agreement with Tyson's promoter Don King. The two sides eventually agreed to a blockbuster deal that would pay Spinks $13.5 million and Tyson at least $20 million. Before he would fight Spinks, Tyson would make a mandatory defense of his title in Tokyo against Tony Tubbs, who was also looking to regain the heavyweight championship after having lost it; Tyson won by knockout in the second round.

After suffering what would prove to be the only knockout loss in his career, Holmes went back into retirement immediately following the fight. However, he would come back for a second time in 1991. He would win his next 5 fights before facing undefeated Olympic Gold Medalist Ray Mercer on February 7, 1992. In an upset, Holmes would defeat Mercer by unanimous decision and earn the right to face Undisputed Heavyweight Champion Evander Holyfield. Though Holmes went the distance with the younger Holyfield, he was unable to pull off the victory as Holyfield won the fight via unanimous decision.

== Undercard ==
Confirmed bouts:

== Broadcasting ==
Country	Broadcaster
Philippines	GMA Network
United Kingdom	ITV
United States	HBO

Preceded by vs. Tyrell Biggs	Mike Tyson's bouts January 22, 1988	Succeeded by vs. Tony Tubbs
Preceded by vs. Michael Spinks II	Larry Holmes's bouts January 22, 1988	Succeeded by vs. Tim Anderson
