= Eddie Davis (boxer) =

American boxer

Eddie Davis (born 4 October 1951, in Dillon, South Carolina, USA) was a professional light heavyweight boxer. Overall, he compiled a record of 34 wins (20 by knockout), 6 losses, and 1 draw.

Davis started his career by knocking out fellow boxer Otis Gordon in two rounds. His star rose with five more wins, but this streak ended with a draw with Mario Rosa. He won four more fights, but then lost to future champion Marvin Johnson and was knocked out by Pete McIntyre.

He lost in his first title fight to Dwight Muhammad Qawi. Subsequently, he fought twice more for the world title, but lost to the undefeated Michael Spinks in 1984, on points, and later to Donny Lalonde, by knockout. His loss to Lalonde was his last fight.

== Professional boxing record ==
34 Wins (20 knockouts, 14 decisions), 6 Losses (5 knockouts, 1 decision), 1 Draw
Result	Record	Opponent	Type	Round	Date	Location	Notes
Loss	29-2	(Canada) Donny "Golden Boy" Lalonde	TKO	2	27/11/1987	Port-of-Spain, Trinidad and Tobago	WBC World Light Heavyweight Title. Referee stopped the bout at 0:22 of the second round.
Win	8-3-1	(United States) Tim Bullock	TKO	9	26/09/1986	Atlantic City, New Jersey, United States	
Win	7-7	(United States) Jack Johnson	UD	10	26/06/1986	Atlantic City, New Jersey, United States	
Win	12-0	(United States) Kelvin "Special K" Kelly	PTS	10	25/04/1986	Stateline, Nevada, United States	
Win	13-8-2	(United States) Arthel "Bam Bam" Lawhorne	UD	10	28/02/1986	Atlantic City, New Jersey, United States	7-3, 7-2, 6-4.
Win	13-7-2	(United States) Arthel "Bam Bam" Lawhorne	DQ	6	17/10/1985	Atlantic City, New Jersey, United States	Lawhorne disqualified at 0:42 of the sixth round for hitting with an open glove.
Loss	38-5	(United States) Marvin Johnson	TKO	5	21/04/1985	Atlantic City, New Jersey, United States	IBF USBA Light Heavyweight Title. Referee stopped the bout at 0:59 of the fifth round.
Win	40-24-1	(United States) Rudy Robles	KO	3	08/12/1984	Phoenix, Arizona, United States	
Win	17-4-1	(United States) Chris Schwenke	KO	4	17/07/1984	(Washington (state)) SeaTac, Washington, United States	
Loss	24-0	(United States) Michael "Jinx" Spinks	UD	12	25/02/1984	Atlantic City, New Jersey, United States	WBC/WBA/IBF World Light Heavyweight Titles. 109-119, 114-115, 111-118.
Win	17-2-1	(United States) Chris Schwenke	TKO	5	13/12/1983	(Washington (state)) Seattle, Washington, United States	
Win	24-9-2	(United States) Dale Grant	UD	12	24/08/1983	Creswell, Oregon, United States	IBF USBA Light Heavyweight Title. 118-112, 119-114, 119-115.
Win	22-23-2	(United States) "King" James Williams	TKO	8	13/05/1983	Des Moines, Iowa, United States	IBF USBA Light Heavyweight Title.
Win	22-20-2	(United States) "King" James Williams	UD	10	11/02/1983	Eugene, Oregon, United States	100-89, 100-93, 100-91.
Loss	18-1-1	(United States) "Camden Buzzsaw" Dwight Muhammad Qawi	TKO	11	20/11/1982	Atlantic City, New Jersey, United States	WBC World Light Heavyweight Title. Referee stopped the bout at 0:28 of the 11th round.
Win	32-7	(Scotland) Murray Sutherland	TKO	6	11/06/1982	Las Vegas, Nevada, United States	IBF USBA Light Heavyweight Title. Referee stopped the bout at 2:50 of the sixth round.
Win	2-4-1	(United States) "Prince" Charles Smith	KO	2	23/05/1982	Las Vegas, Nevada, United States	
Win	14-9-2	(United States) Don Addison	TKO	4	14/04/1982	(New York (state)) White Plains, New York, United States	
Win	19-2-1	(United States) Pablo Paul Ramos	UD	10	28/11/1981	Stateline, Nevada, United States	97-91, 98-90, 96-93.
Win	2-4	(United States) Jesse Avila	KO	6	18/07/1981	Las Vegas, Nevada, United States	
Win	7-2	(United States) Chris "Deep" Wells	TKO	5	17/05/1981	Atlantic City, New Jersey, United States	Referee stopped the bout at 2:22 of the fifth round.
Win	2-3-2	(United States) Michael Hardin	KO	7	24/04/1981	(New York (state)) White Plains, New York, United States	Hardin knocked out at 0:25 of the seventh round.
Loss	11-11-1	(United States) Pete McIntyre	KO	2	27/09/1980	Inglewood, California, United States	
Win	2-6	(United States) Curtis Goins	KO	7	25/05/1980	Atlantic City, New Jersey, United States	
Win	18-8	(United States) Johnny Wilburn	TKO	8	09/05/1980	(New York (state)) Commack, New York, United States	
Win	0-1	(United States) Willie Ray Taylor	UD	8	23/02/1980	Atlantic City, New Jersey, United States	
Win	5-8-1	(United States) Mike Tarasewich	KO	1	19/10/1979	(New York (state)) Commack, New York, United States	
Win	17-16-1	(United States) "King" George Aidoo	KO	3	03/08/1979	(New York (state)) Hempstead, New York, United States	
Win	5-0	(Dominican Republic) Luis Guzman	MD	8	29/06/1979	(New York (state)) New York City, United States	
Loss	18-1	(United States) Marvin Johnson	KO	7	03/04/1978	Indianapolis, Indiana, United States	
Win	7-4	(United States) Luis "Pudge" Rodriguez	PTS	10	27/01/1978	(New York (state)) Hempstead, New York, United States	
Win	21-6-1	(United States) Mario Rosa	PTS	10	27/08/1977	(New York (state)) Hempstead, New York, United States	
Win	13-2	(United States) "Cowboy" Bob Stewart	TKO	4	08/04/1977	(New York (state)) Syracuse, New York, United States	
Win	4-1-1	(United States) Jose Elias	PTS	8	18/01/1977	(New York (state)) Sunnyside, Queens, New York, United States	
Draw	19-6	(United States) Mario Rosa	PTS	10	05/11/1976	(New York (state)) Sunnyside, Queens, New York, United States	
Win	3-22-1	(Puerto Rico) Sixto Martinez	KO	3	02/06/1976	(New York (state)) Uniondale, New York, United States	
Win	2-4	(United States) DC Walker	PTS	6	31/03/1976	(New York (state)) Uniondale, New York, United States	
Win	1-4	(Puerto Rico) Carlos Espada	KO	1	24/01/1976	(New York (state)) Commack, New York, United States	
Win	2-0	(Dominican Republic) Leonardo Rodgers	DQ	2	28/11/1975	(New York (state)) Commack, New York, United States	
Win	0-1	(United States) Al Ware	KO	1	17/10/1975	(New York (state)) Commack, New York, United States	
Win	0-1	(United States) Otis Gordon	KO	2	12/09/1975	(New York (state)) Commack, New York, United States	Gordon knocked out at 2:34 of the second round.
