= Flo Anthony =

American gossip columnist (1952–2026)

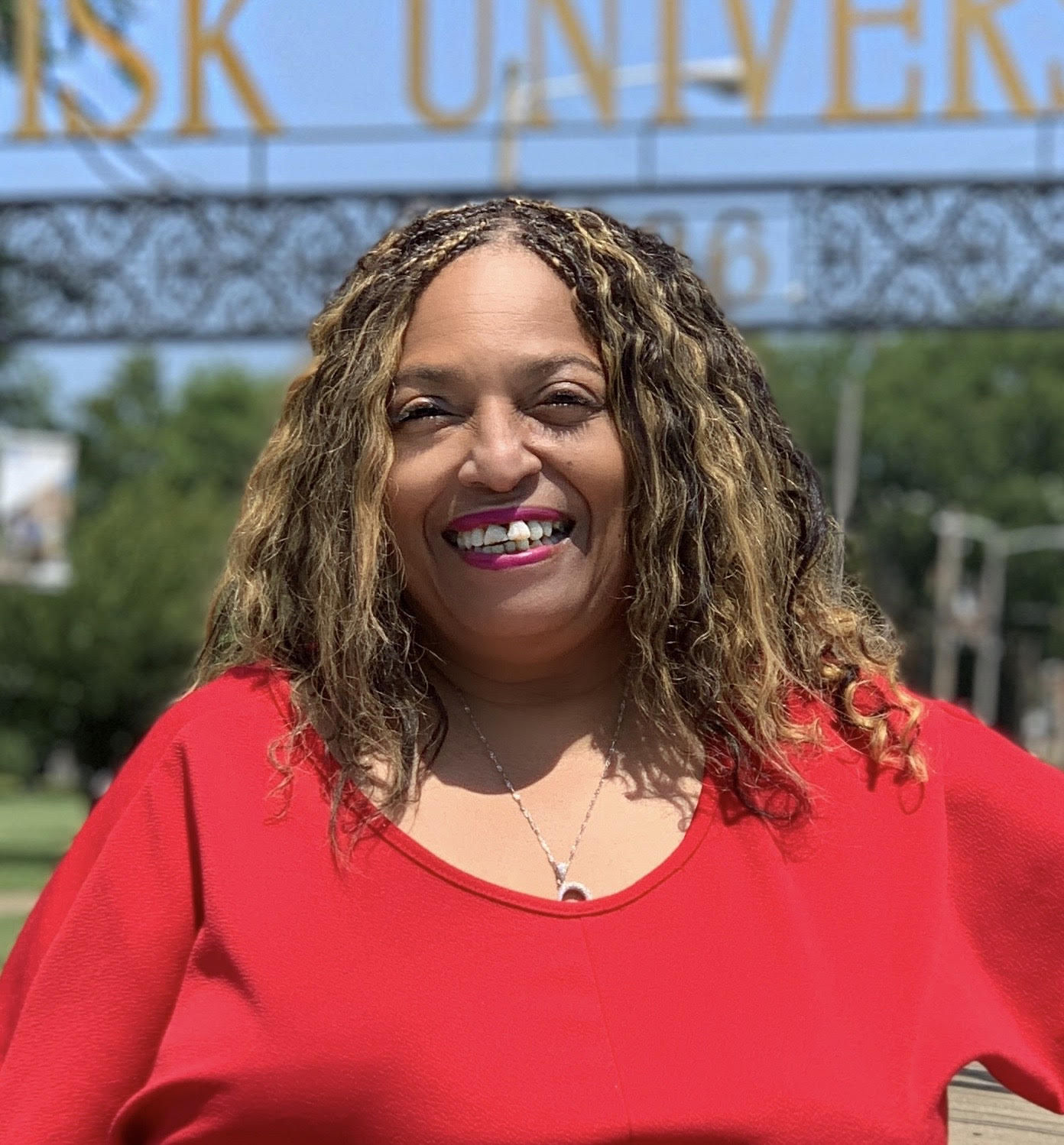
- Anthony in 2019
- Born: Florence Anthony; March 4, 1952; Ann Arbor, Michigan, U.S.
- Died: August 6, 2026 (aged 74)
- Occupations: Gossip columnist, radio host, television correspondent and author
- Years active: 1980s–2026
- Spouse: Michael Spinks (m. 2026)

Florence Anthony (March 4, 1952 – August 6, 2026) was an American gossip columnist, syndicated radio host, television contributor, and author. She wrote for the gossip page of the Philadelphia Sun and columns for The National Examiner.

== Early life and career ==
Anthony was a graduate of Howard University.

After working as a publicist for athletes such as Muhammad Ali, Butch Lewis, Michael Spinks, Larry Holmes, Mike McCallum, and Matthew Saad Muhammad, Anthony wrote for entertainment news in the mid-1980s.

She was the first African-American reporter to work on the gossip column of the New York Post, as well as the first African-American to write a column in The National Examiner. An expert for numerous celebrities including Michael Jackson, O. J. Simpson, Whitney Houston, and Donald Trump, Anthony was a contributor on news magazine shows like Inside Edition, The Insider, and Entertainment Tonight.

In the 1990s, Anthony appeared on The Ricki Lake Show, The Rolonda Watts Show, The Joan Rivers Show, Geraldo, The Sally Jessy Raphael Show, The Tempestt Bledsoe Show, The Gordon Elliott Show, Forgive or Forget, The Leeza Gibbons Show, The Danny Bonaduce Show, The Bertice Berry Show, The Mark Walberg Show, The Vicki Lawrence Show, and The Maury Povich Show. She was also a guest on Court TV, MSNBC, Fox News Channel, CNN, HLN, The Dini Petty Show, and The Camilla Scott Show. She also worked in radio on the nationally syndicated Tom Joyner Morning Show with her segment "Gossip to Go with Flo" as well as the Skip Murphy and the Morning Show in Dallas, Texas.

For six seasons, Anthony was a contributor and substitute co-host of E! Network's The Gossip Show, a roundtable entertainment news show featuring gossip columnists. She also appeared on E! True Hollywood Story episodes on celebrities like La Toya Jackson, Robin Givens, Janet Jackson, Whitney Houston, and Bobby Brown.

With her company Dottie Media Group LLC, Anthony had two syndicated radio shows, Gossip To Go With Flo and Flo Anthony's Big Apple Buzz, which were distributed in partnership with Superadio. The shows were heard by over three million listeners daily in 20 radio markets nationwide in 2017.

As a writer, Anthony was a regular contributor to the New York Daily News, providing entertainment news stories for its Confidential column. She also had a weekly syndicated column of her own that appeared in The New York Amsterdam News, Philadelphia Sunday Sun, BRE Magazine, Columbus Times, and Oklahoma Eagle. Anthony also worked on Steven Hoffenberg's PostPublishing.buzz website and was a contributing writer for Resident magazine. She was a past publisher/editor-in-chief of Black Noir magazine, as well as editor-in-chief of Black Elegance magazine.

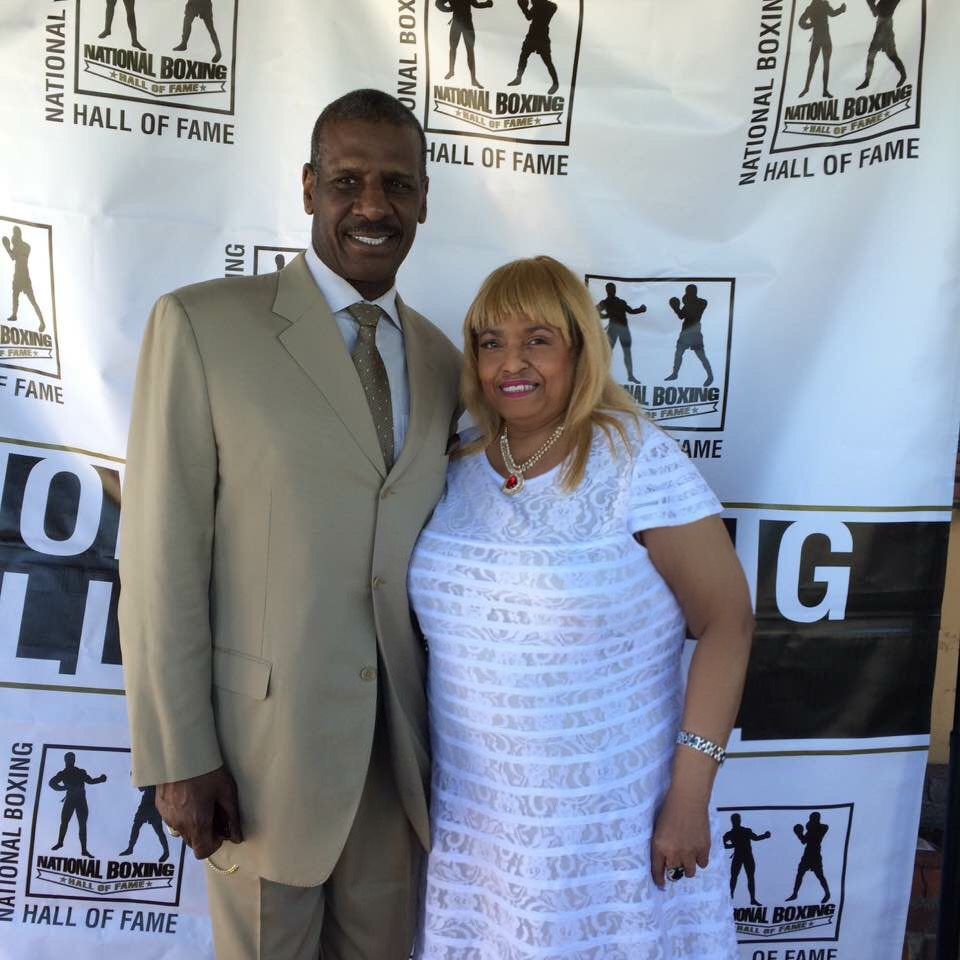
Michael Spinks and Flo Anthony at the National Boxing Hall of Fame in Los Angeles

On television, she was regularly featured as a guest contributor on TV One's documentary series Unsung and Unsung: Hollywood. She also appeared for numerous seasons on TV One's series Life After. Anthony also covered breaking news and celebrity culture on multiple cable news shows and local shows such as Good Day New York.

As an author, Anthony released her first novel, Keeping Secrets Telling Lies, in 2000. Her second novel was released in 2013, when she signed a book deal with Zane's Strebor Books to release Deadly Stuff Players. The sequel to that novel, One Last Deadly Pay was released in 2016, through W. Clark Distribution. Anthony regularly appeared at book festivals and expos signing copies of her books.

Anthony also provided personal appearances and publicity for her husband, the retired boxer Michael Spinks.

== Personal life and death ==
Anthony began dating boxer Michael Spinks in 1987. The couple married on January 6, 2026. She resided in the East Harlem section of New York City.

Flo Anthony died on August 6, 2026, at the age of 74.
