= Michael Spinks vs. Larry Holmes II =

Boxing match

Vindication in Vegas
- Date: 19 April 1986
- Venue: Las Vegas Hilton, Las Vegas, Nevada
- Title(s) on the line: IBF, The Ring and Lineal heavyweight titles

Tale of the tape
Boxer	Michael Spinks	Larry Holmes
Nickname	Jinx	The Easton Assassin
Hometown	St. Louis, Missouri	Easton, Pennsylvania
Purse	$2,000,000	$1,125,000
Pre-fight record	28–0 (19 KO)	48–1 (34 KO)
Age	29 years, 9 months	36 years, 5 months
Height	6 ft 2 1/2 in (189 cm)	6 ft 3 in (191 cm)
Weight	205 lb (93 kg)	223 lb (101 kg)
Style	Orthodox	Orthodox
Recognition	IBF, The Ring and Lineal; Heavyweight Champion	IBF; No. 1 Ranked Heavyweight; The Ring; No. 2 Ranked Heavyweight; Former Heavyweight Champion

Result
- Spinks defeated Holmes by Split Decision

Michael Spinks vs. Larry Holmes II, billed as Vindication in Vegas, was a professional boxing match contested on 19 April 1986, IBF, The Ring and Lineal heavyweight championship.

== Background ==
In October 1985, shortly after Michael Spinks defeated Larry Holmes to win the heavyweight title, promotor Don King pitched to HBO Sports president Seth Abraham a World Series style competition to unify the heavyweight division which had been without an undisputed champion since Leon Spinks in 1978. By mid January 1986 negotiations between King and the other promoters (including Spinks' promoter Butch Lewis) were completed and the Heavyweight unification series was set to began in March with Pinklon Thomas vs. Trevor Berbick. Spinks' first bout in this series would be a rematch with Holmes a month late.

In the build up the bout, Holmes sent a letter to IBF president Bob Lee listing the Judges he didn't want to officiate the rematch, Lee however declined to take Holmes' advice. Holmes would later claim that the judges from the first fight "must have been drunk" when they scored Spinks the winner.

Holmes was a 7½ to 5 betting favourite.

== The fight ==
Holmes would start the fight strong, throwing many hard shots and left jabs while Spinks was focused on dodging punches and keeping out of range. As the rounds went on, Spinks would start using his jab and left hook to wear down Holmes.

The 14th round would start with Spinks scoring with a series of jabs and head punches, however with about a minute left in the round, Holmes suddenly badly hurt Spinks with a right high to the head. Spinks bent at the knee and almost went down. Holmes would land a couple more punches but he couldn't finish off Spinks, who as the round drew to a close threw a series of head shots that backed Holmes across the ring. Holmes would again hurt Spinks in the final round, with a right that had the champion backing into the ropes.

Judge Joe Cortez scored the contest 144–141 in favour of Holmes, but the other two judges Frank Brunette and Jerry Roth scored it for Spinks 144–141 and 144–142 respectively, giving the champion a split decision victory.

HBO's unofficial scorer Harold Lederman (who had been one of the three judges for the first bout) had it 144–141 for Holmes. The Associated Press also scored the bout for Holmes, 143–142.

== Aftermath ==
Speaking in the ring afterwards Spinks said "I had to stay cool and calm, then break his morale, Larry proved to be one hell of a champion. He was a die-hard out there tonight." In a post-fight interview with HBO, Holmes said, "the judges, the referees and promoters can kiss me where the sun don't shine—and because we're on HBO, that's my big black behind."

Holmes was taken to Valley Hospital, after breaking his right thumb in the third round. He would announce his retirement in November 1986.

== Undercard ==
Confirmed bouts:

== Broadcasting ==
Country	Broadcaster
Philippines	PTV 4
United Kingdom	ITV
United States	HBO

Preceded by First Fight	Michael Spinks's bouts 19 April 1986	Succeeded by vs. Steffen Tangstad
Preceded by First Fight	Larry Holmes's bouts 19 April 1986	Succeeded by vs. Mike Tyson
