= Frank Cappuccino =

American boxing referee

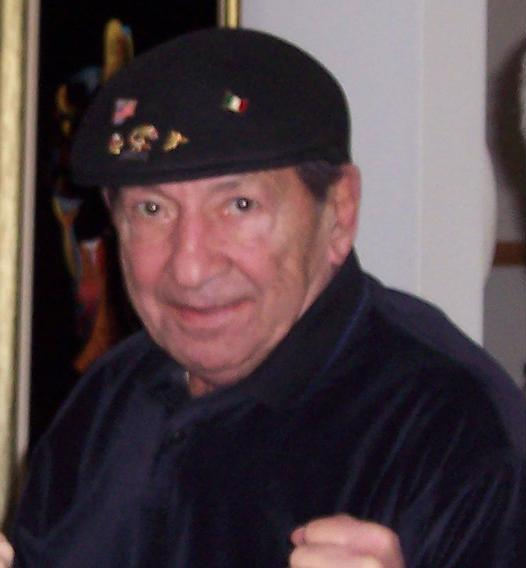
Frank Cappuccino

Frank Capcino (February 7, 1929 – June 8, 2015), better known by his ring name Frank Cappuccino, was a boxing referee best known for having officiated over some of the most famous boxing matches in history.

== Career ==
Cappuccino was born in Philadelphia and grew up in the neighborhood known as Kensington. Both he and his brother Vito (Vic) were accomplished boxers. Fighting as a lightweight (130 lb. class), Cappuccino fought more than 130 amateur bouts in the early 1950s. He participated in the Pennsylvania state championships and was a finalist in both the Diamond Belt and Golden Glove Tournaments. Leaving the amateur ranks in 1955, Cappuccino turned professional under the management of George Katz. Though undefeated in six professional matches, Cappuccino retired early. Asked why he didn't continue with his professional career, Cappuccino told Northeast Times reporter Joe Mason, "I decided that I had to either get out or get knocked on my heels. But I loved the sport and I wanted to stay involved."

Cappuccino received his referee's license in 1958. Over a half-century, he was the third man in the ring for over 25,000 bouts, including an estimated 10,000 professional matches. He has officiated 94 world championship bouts in North America, Europe and Asia.

Boxing experts tended to praise Cappuccino's work in the squared circle. He typically allowed a boxer in trouble to try to fight his way out of it, rather than calling an abrupt (and unpopular) technical knockout. This was best evidenced in the memorable 2002 Mickey Ward vs. Arturo Gatti fight. Despite this, there never was an incident of serious injury in a match Cappuccino presided over. Asked about having Cappuccino as a referee, boxer Mickey Ward replied, "Frank was great and still is. He's an old guy but he does his homework and lets you fight your fight. I'd love to get Frank again. He does everything with his voice. I have a lot of respect for him." Cappuccino was enshrined in both the Pennsylvania and New Jersey Boxing Hall of Fame.

Cappuccino also served as a boxing judge for several fights. The most notable bout he judged was Michael Spinks versus Dwight Muhammad Qawi for the undisputed World Light Heavyweight Championship, fought on March 18, 1983. Spinks won by unanimous decision.

Outside the ring, Cappuccino was a supervisor for the Keebler Company. He also served as a sanitation control inspector for the School District of Philadelphia. He resided in Yardley, Pennsylvania. He was survived by his wife, Florence.

== Memorable fights ==
- Mickey Ward, decisioned (10 rounds), and Arturo Gatti, May 19, 2002, Uncasville, Connecticut. It is considered by many boxing purists as "The Fight of the Century." Cappuccino played a prominent role by masterful refereeing this tight and savage battle. In the fourth round, Gatti blasts a low punch into Ward's groin sending him down in pain. Cappuccino calls it a slip and takes a point from Gatti for the low blow. In the ninth round, Ward and Gatti landed an incredible 110 total punches—102 of them power shots. Late in the round, Gatti was enduring a severe beating from Ward; but the seasoned Cappuccino still saw some fight left in Arturo. It was a seminal moment; knowing the monumental nature of this fight, Cappuccino will not end this brawl on some technicality. Indeed, Gatti responded and fought back as the bell sounded. After the round, ring announcer Jim Lampley told a national audience, "The fight is being stopped!" Ward raised his arms in victory and both fighters approached the center of the ring. Cappuccino tells the world, "The fight ain't over!" The fight resumed for the tenth and final round as people rushed back into their seats. The fight was ruled a majority decision for Ward. Had Cappuccino not penalized Gatti for the punch below the belt, the fight would have ended in a draw. However, the deduction was just as he warned Gatti about punching low several times before. Memorably, as the exhausted boxers entered a clinch in the final round, Cappuccino cautioned both fighters to 'Wind it up like pros, huh?'
- Lennox Lewis, TKO (5th round), and Shannon Briggs, for Lewis’ WBC Heavyweight Title, March 28, 1998, Atlantic City, New Jersey. In the fifth round, Briggs was beaten repeatedly by Lewis and was knocked down. Briggs got up on his feet and convinced Cappuccino to let him continue. After taking more punishment from Lennox Lewis, Shannon Briggs launched a wild left hook that misses Lewis. The momentum of the errant punch fells the weakened Briggs to the canvas. Cappuccino had seen enough and he stopped the fight.
- Bernard "The Executioner" Hopkins, TKO (11th round), and Carl Daniels, for Hopkins’ Undisputed WBC, WBA, and IBF Middleweight Title, February 2, 2002. The fight marked Hopkins’ 15th consecutive successful title defense - breaking the 25-year-old middleweight championship defense record held by Carlos Monzón. Cappuccino stopped the bout on the advice of Daniels' corner.
- Mike Tyson, KO (1st round), Michael Spinks, for Tyson's undisputed WBC, WBA, and IBF heavyweight titles, June 27, 1988, Atlantic City, New Jersey. In a battle of undefeated fighters, Tyson knocked Spinks out in 91 seconds. Cappuccino is prominently featured in Sports Illustrated magazine. Cappuccino considered it the greatest moment of his referee career. He commented, "I remember thinking here I am, a guy from Kensington, and I'm in the ring, looking out in the crowd, and I see people like Charlie Sheen and Jack Nicholson and Martin Sheen. It was really something special. And people like Oprah Winfrey and Frank Sinatra missed the fight because it only lasted ninety-one seconds." Cappuccino and the oft-maligned Tyson had a unique relationship. Frank refereed six of his bouts. When asked about Tyson, Cappuccino replied, "I can't say a bad thing about Mike Tyson. He's always been very good to me."

== Movies ==
- Rocky V (1990) - Referee
