= Oscar Rivadeneira =

Peruvian boxer

Oscar Rivadeneira (born in 1960 in Lima) is a retired Peruvian boxer.

Rivadeneira fought with Michael Spinks in 1983 for the Undisputed Light Heavyweight championship. He was beaten in a tenth round knockout.
