= Mario Rosa =

Italian historian (1932–2022)

Mario Rosa (8 May 1932 – 24 December 2022) was an Italian historian.

== Life and career ==
Rosa was born on 8 May 1932. He studied at the Scuola Normale Superiore in Pisa. Rosa had taught early modern history at the Universities of Lecce, Bari, Pisa, La Sapienza of Rome and finally at the Scuola Normale Superiore of Pisa, where he served also as deputy-director and where he was actually emeritus.

Rosa also taught as professeur invité at the École des Hautes Études en Sciences Sociales in Paris. He was of the Accademia nazionale dei Lincei. His research concerned the religious history of the 18th century, the ecclesiastical, cultural and religious history between 16th and 17th centuries, the history of science, academia and libraries.

Rosa died on 24 December 2022, at the age of 90.

== Bibliography (selected) ==
- Riformatori e ribelli nel '700 religioso italiano (Dedalo, 1969).
- Politica e religione nel '700 europeo (Sansoni, 1974).
- Religione e società nel Mezzogiorno tra Cinque e Seicento (De Donato, 1976).
- (a cura di) Cattolicesimo e lumi nel Settecento italiano (Herder, 1981).
- La Chiesa e gli Stati italiani nell'età dell'assolutismo, in Letteratura Italiana, I (Einaudi, 1982).
- La Chiesa meridionale nell'età della Controriforma, in Storia d'Italia, Annali, 9 (Einaudi, 1986).
- La religiosa, in L'uomo barocco, a cura di R. Villari (Laterza, 1991).
- Settecento religioso. Politica della Ragione e religione del cuore (Marsilio, 1999).
- Clero cattolico e società europea nell'età moderna (Laterza, 2006).
- La contrastata ragione. Riforme e religione nell'Italia del Settecento (Edizioni di Storia e Letteratura, 2009).
- La curia romana nell'età moderna. Istituzioni, cultura, carriere (Viella, 2013).
- Il giansenismo nell'Italia del Settecento. Dalla riforma della Chiesa alla democrazia rivoluzionaria (Carocci, 2014).
