= Steffen Tangstad =

Norwegian boxer (1959–2024)

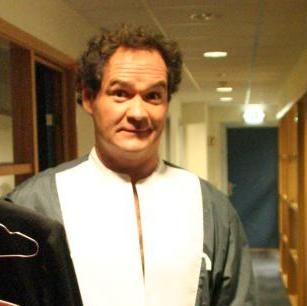

Personal information
- Nationality: Norwegian
- Born: 22 June 1959 Tønsberg, Norway
- Died: 26 June 2024 (aged 65) Tønsberg, Norway
- Height: 1.88 m (6 ft 2 in)

Boxing career

Boxing record
- Wins: 24
- Win by KO: 14
- Losses: 2
- Draws: 2

Steffen Tangstad (22 June 1959 – 26 June 2024) was a Norwegian professional boxer and two-time European Heavyweight Champion.

Tangstad fought Michael Spinks for the IBF Heavyweight title on 6 September 1986, losing as a result of a fourth-round knockout. That was Tangstad's final bout. He retired with a career record of 24 wins (14 by knockout), 2 losses and 2 draws.

After retiring from the boxing ring, Tangstad began a career in Norwegian television and was the CEO of the now defunct "Modern Sports & Events" (MSE), which was licensed to broadcast UFC pay-per-view events in Scandinavia.

In 2006, he participated in the second season of Skal vi danse?.

Tangstad died after a long illness on 26 June 2024, at the age of 65. He had had his leg amputated three years before. He had been struggling with peripheral neuropathy, and had lost the use of his hands, arms and legs.

== Professional boxing record ==
24 Wins (14 knockouts, 10 decisions), 2 Losses (2 knockouts), 2 Draws
Result	Record	Opponent	Type	Round	Date	Location	Notes
Loss	24-2-2	(United States) Michael Spinks	TKO	4	6 September 1986	(United States) Las Vegas Hilton, Las Vegas, Nevada	IBF Heavyweight Title. Referee stopped the bout at 0:58 of the fourth round.
Win	24-1-2	(Malta) John Westgarth	SD	12	18 April 1986	(Denmark) Randers Hallen, Randers	EBU Heavyweight Title.
Win	23-1-2	(Uruguay) Alfredo Evangelista	PTS	8	10 January 1986	(Denmark) Randers Hallen, Randers	
Win	22-1-2	(Germany) Reiner Hartmann	KO	7	1 November 1985	(Denmark) K.B. Hallen, Copenhagen	
Loss	21-1-2	(Sweden) Anders Eklund	TKO	4	9 March 1985	(Denmark) Copenhagen	EBU Heavyweight Title.
Win	21-0-2	(France) Lucien Rodriguez	UD	12	9 November 1984	(Denmark) K.B. Hallen, Copenhagen	EBU Heavyweight Title.
Win	20-0-2	(Wales) Winston Allen	PTS	8	14 July 1984	(United Kingdom) Crest Hotel, Bloomsbury, London	
Win	19-0-2	(Australia) Joe Bugner	SD	10	18 February 1984	(Denmark) Osterbro Stadium, Copenhagen	
Win	18-0-2	(Canada) Ken Lakusta	PTS	8	13 January 1984	(Denmark) Randers Hallen, Randers	
Win	17-0-2	(Italy) Guido Trane	PTS	8	1 December 1983	(Denmark) K.B. Hallen, Copenhagen	
Win	16-0-2	(United States) Joe Tank Mooney	TKO	2	24 October 1983	(United States) Chicago	
Win	15-0-2	(United States) Bashir Wadud	PTS	10	8 September 1983	(United States) Americana Congress Hotel, Chicago	
Win	14-0-2	(United States) Larry Roberson	TKO	5	28 July 1983	(United States) Americana Congress Hotel, Chicago	
Draw	13-0-2	(United States) Buster Douglas	PTS	8	16 October 1982	(United States) Bismarck Hotel, Chicago	
Win	13-0-1	(United States) Walter Ware	KO	7	7 September 1982	(United States) Bismarck Hotel, Chicago	Ware knocked out at 2:22 of the seventh round.
Win	12-0-1	(United States) Ron Draper	TKO	7	16 August 1982	(United States) Bismarck Hotel, Chicago	
Win	11-0-1	(Germany) Juergen Gries	KO	2	25 June 1982	(Finland) Hanko	
Win	10-0-1	(United States) Jimmy Cross	TKO	5	30 April 1982	(United States) McCormick Inn, Chicago	Referee stopped the bout at 2:44 of the fifth round.
Win	9-0-1	(United States) William Scott	KO	2	19 February 1982	(United States) McCormick Inn, Chicago	Scott knocked out at 0:41 of the second round.
Win	8-0-1	(United States) Man Banks	KO	2	5 February 1982	(United States) Civic Center, Danville, Illinois	Banks knocked out at 1:45 of the second round.
Win	7-0-1	(United States) Larry Givens	UD	6	15 December 1981	(United States) McCormick Inn, Chicago	
Win	6-0-1	(United States) Jerry Brown	KO	1	20 November 1981	(United States) McCormick Inn, Chicago	Brown knocked out at 1:55 of the first round.
Win	5-0-1	(United States) Mike Lear	KO	2	21 October 1981	(United States) Chicago	
Win	4-0-1	(United States) Raymond White	PTS	6	22 June 1981	(United States) Chicago	
Win	3-0-1	(United States) Mike Kacher	KO	3	4 May 1981	(United States) Chicago	
Win	2-0-1	(United States) Stan White Johnson	KO	1	16 April 1981	(United States) Hilton Hotel, Chicago	
Win	1-0-1	(United States) Anthony Elmore	KO	2	7 March 1981	(United States) Chicago	
Draw	0-0-1	(United States) Benji Smith	PTS	4	1 October 1980	(Norway) Chateau Neuf, Oslo	
