= Michael Spinks =

American boxer (born 1956)

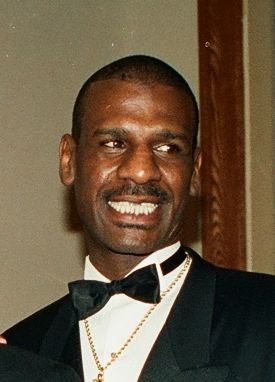
- Spinks in 1996

Personal information
- Nickname: Jinx
- Born: July 22, 1956 (age 70) St. Louis, Missouri, U.S
- Height: 6 ft 2 1/2 in (189 cm)
- Weight: Light heavyweight; Heavyweight

Boxing career
- Reach: 76 in (193 cm)
- Stance: Orthodox

Boxing record
- Total fights: 32
- Wins: 31
- Win by KO: 21
- Losses: 1
Medal record
Men's amateur boxing
Representing United States
Olympic Games
Gold medal – first place	1976 Montreal	Middleweight

Michael Spinks (born July 22, 1956) (Note: Encyclopædia Britannica gives Spinks' birthdate as July 13th. The New York Times gave his birthdate as July 13 in an article published in 1987 and World Boxing Association published an article on his 60th birthday on July 22, 2016. In 2010 Sports Illustrated included Spinks in a list of persons born on July 22nd.) is an American former professional boxer who competed from 1977 to 1988. He held world championships in two weight classes, including the undisputed light heavyweight title from 1983 to 1985, and the lineal heavyweight title from 1985 to 1988. As an amateur he won a gold medal in the middleweight division at the 1976 Summer Olympics.

Nicknamed "Jinx", which spawned the nickname of his straight right hand, "the Spinks Jinx", Spinks is the brother of late world heavyweight champion Leon Spinks, and uncle of Cory Spinks, a former welterweight and light middleweight champion.

After a successful amateur career, which culminated in his Olympic gold medal win, Spinks went undefeated in his first 31 professional fights, beating Dwight Muhammad Qawi, Eddie Mustafa Muhammad, Marvin Johnson and Eddie Davis en route to becoming the undisputed light heavyweight champion. After defending the title against 10 different fighters, Spinks moved up to heavyweight, and as an underdog defeated long-reigning IBF heavyweight champion Larry Holmes (whose own 48–0 record up to that point was one victory short of tying Rocky Marciano's 49–0 unblemished record); in doing so, Spinks became the first reigning light heavyweight world champion to win the heavyweight title. In his final fight, Spinks was knocked out by Mike Tyson in 91 seconds, the only defeat of his professional career.

Spinks has been inducted into the International Boxing Hall of Fame and the World Boxing Hall of Fame. The International Boxing Research Organization and BoxRec rank Spinks among the 10 greatest light heavyweights of all time.

== Amateur career ==
Spinks won the 1974 156-pound Golden Gloves Light Middleweight Championship by defeating Wilber Cameron in Denver, Colorado, and then took the silver medal in the National AAU 165-pound Championship Competition in 1975, losing in three rounds to Tom Sullivan in Shreveport, Louisiana. He rebounded to take the 1976 National Golden Gloves Middleweight championship with a three-round victory over Lamont Kirkland in Miami, Florida, and that same year captured the United States Olympic Trials Middleweight Championship by defeating Keith Broom in Cincinnati, Ohio. At the 1976 Montreal Olympics, Spinks benefited from a favorable draw. Due to a bye and two wins by walkover, he was only required to box two opponents to win the gold medal in the middleweight division. He went on to defeat the Soviet Union's Rufat Riskiyev in the final.

=== Highlights ===
- Compiled an amateur record of (93–7)
- Won the 1974 Light Middleweight (156 lb.) National Golden Gloves Championship.
- Made it to the finals of the 1975 National AAU, losing to Tommy Brooks
- Won the 1976 Middleweight (165 lb.) National Golden Gloves Championship in Miami, Florida.
- Won the Middleweight Gold Medal for the United States at the 1976 Olympic Games in Montreal, Quebec, Canada.

=== Olympic results ===
Gold at the XXI Summer Olympics (165 lbs), Montreal, Canada, July 1976:

- Round of 32: bye
- Round of 16: Defeated Jean-Marie Emebe (Cameroon) by walkover
- Quarterfinal: Defeated Ryszard Pasiewicz (Poland) by unanimous decision, 5–0
- Semifinal: Defeated Alec Năstac (Romania) by walkover
- Final: Defeated Rufat Riskiyev (Soviet Union) RSC 3 (Riskiyev knocked down in the 1st rd, referee stopped the fight at 1:54)

Spinks finished his amateur career with a record of 93 wins (35 knockouts,) 7 losses.

== Hiatus ==
With the Olympics behind him, Spinks returned to work at a chemical factory in St. Louis, Missouri, "scrubbing floors and cleaning toilets," as one source tells it. He had no big contracts awaiting him and, while Michael appeared to experts to be the more promising of the two brothers, Leon was at that time the big shooting star, a television staple of ABC Sports, on his way to a shot at heavyweight champion Muhammad Ali. Michael had their mother to care for, and he was intent on helping Leon prepare for Ali. All of this pushed Michael's career to the back burner. It was Butch Lewis in 1977 who convinced Michael to turn professional.

== Professional career ==
=== Early years ===
Spinks then turned professional with a win over Eddie Benson, knocking him out in one round on April 17, 1977, in Las Vegas. With that, Spinks began a 31 fight winning streak that would almost extend to the end of his career. After four more wins, Spinks finished '77 with the first fight that began a gradual ascent in opposition quality: an eight-round decision over Gary Summerhays, a popular young boxer of the time.

In 1978, Spinks won two fights, including an eight-round decision over former world Middleweight title challenger Tom Bethea, in the same undercard where his brother Leon dethroned Ali as world Heavyweight champion in Las Vegas.

1979 saw Spinks get less than three minutes of boxing action inside a ring, with his only fight ending in a first round knockout of Marc Hans, but in 1980, Spinks took his ascent towards the top to another level, when he beat future IBF super-middleweight champion Murray Sutherland, David Conteh, and fringe contenders Ramon Ronquillo and Alvaro Yaqui Lopez (who challenged for a world title four times). Of his five wins that year, three came by knockout, Sutherland and Johnny Wilburn being the only ones who lasted the distance.

=== First world title ===
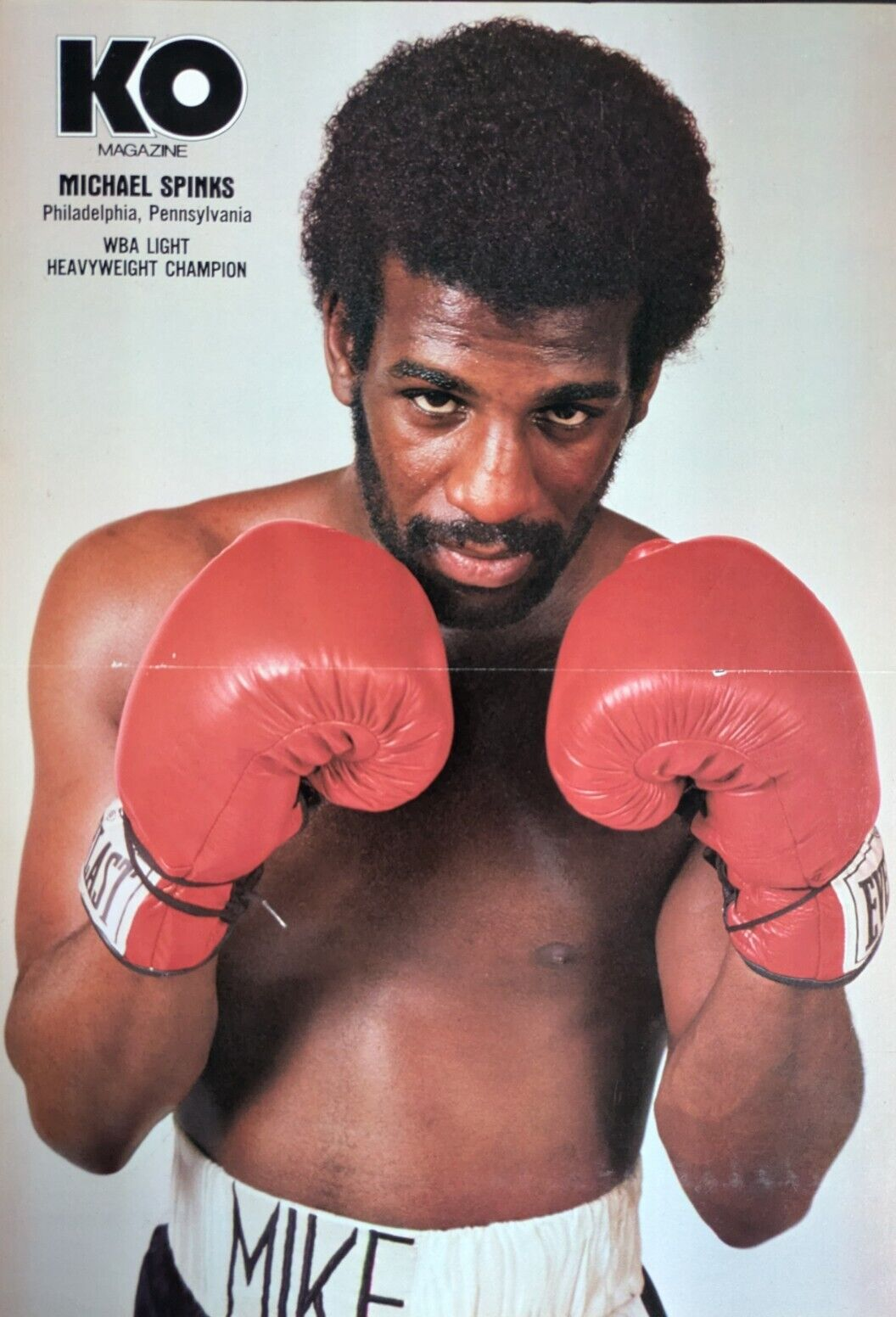
Poster of Spinks on KO Magazine July 1982 issue

By 1981, Spinks was already a top ranked contender, and after beating former and future world light-heavyweight champion Marvin Johnson by a knockout in four rounds, the WBA made Spinks their number one challenger, and so, on July 18 of that year, he met WBA light-heavyweight champion Eddie Mustafa Muhammad, once again in Las Vegas. Spinks dropped Mustafa Muhammad in round 12 and went on to become the WBA light heavyweight champion with a 15-round decision win. He defended the title once in '81, beating Vonzell Johnson by a knockout in seven.

1982 began with a knockout victory over Mustafa Wassaja. Spinks had become a superstar, at least in the boxing world. He began appearing on the covers of boxing magazines and boxing fans started clamoring for a unification fight with WBC champion Dwight Muhammad Qawi. Tragedy struck his life, however, when in January 1983, his 24-year-old wife, Sandy Massey, died in a car crash, leaving Spinks the single parent of his two-year-old daughter, Michelle.

=== Spinks vs Qawi ===
Meanwhile, the fight all the fans wanted was being asked for by boxing critics and magazine editors, too. On March 18, two months after his wife's death, Spinks and Qawi met in a boxing ring for the undisputed light heavyweight championship. The fight was broadcast by HBO World Championship Boxing, and, according to the book The Ring: Boxing the 20th Century, Spinks had a very tough moment to overcome before it even started: His daughter asked him, while he was in his dressing room, if her mother would come to watch the fight. After breaking into tears he composed himself and dominated the fight with his jab and plenty of strategic hooks and crosses. He repeatedly stopped Qawi in his tracks over the first 11 rounds but cautiously waited for Qawi to come out of his crouched defense to resume his assault. Qawi scored a knockdown in round eight. The official scores were 144–140, 144–141, and 144–141, all for Spinks, who was now the undisputed world Light Heavyweight champion. He defended the title one more time before the end of the year, against Oscar Rivadeneira, whom he beat by a ten-round knockout.

Spinks fought only once in 1984, retaining his crown with a twelve-round majority decision over Eddie Davis. He and Qawi were only a couple of weeks away from fighting a rematch in September of that year, but that fight got called off when Qawi was injured during training. Spinks also was recognized as IBF Light heavyweight champion in 1984.

=== Holmes vs Spinks ===
In 1985, Spinks beat David Sears and Jim McDonald, both by knockout, in title defenses, before challenging Larry Holmes for the IBF and lineal heavyweight championship. Holmes was trying to tie Rocky Marciano's record of 49–0 as the heavyweight champion, but it was Spinks who made history that night, winning a controversial and narrow fifteen-round unanimous decision and becoming the first ever world light-heavyweight champion to win the world heavyweight title. His controversial victory over Holmes was named Ring Magazine Upset of the Year. With this, Michael and Leon had also become the first pair of brothers ever to be world heavyweight champions, followed two decades later by Wladimir and Vitali Klitschko.

=== Heavyweight champion ===
In 1986, Spinks and Holmes fought a rematch as part of the heavyweight unification series, and had nearly the same result, this time Spinks winning by a 15-round split decision. After that, he retained the world heavyweight championship once again, by a knockout in four against Steffen Tangstad. In 1987 he was stripped of the crown by the IBF for refusing to fight their mandatory challenger, Tony Tucker, and accepting a higher offer to fight Gerry Cooney instead. Spinks knocked out Cooney in five rounds, and after Mike Tyson had unified the heavyweight belts, fans started clamoring for a fight between them as many still recognized Spinks as the legitimate lineal champion.

=== Spinks vs Tyson ===
The fight between Spinks and Mike Tyson took place in June 1988, with Tyson knocking Spinks down twice on his way to a first-round knockout. Tyson and Dwight Muhammad Qawi were the only fighters to officially floor Spinks. It was Spinks's first defeat in the professional ring, and his last, as he retired following the fight. In this fight, he was badly shaken by fear.

Spinks had a record of 31 wins and 0 losses, prior to the fight, with 21 wins by knockout as a professional, and still held The Ring magazine heavyweight title, and had a legitimate claim to the Lineal heavyweight championship, for he never had been beaten for his title before them being stripped from him. And he only lost recognition for both when he lost to Tyson.

In addition to his success as a heavyweight, Spinks is generally considered one of the greatest light-heavyweight champions and fighters of all time. He was the only light-heavyweight champion to remain undefeated in the entire history of the division since its inception in 1903 (until Joe Calzaghe), as well as the only reigning light-heavyweight champion to win the heavyweight title.

The Ring Magazine in 2002 ranked Spinks as the third greatest light-heavyweight of all time, behind Ezzard Charles and Archie Moore, but ahead of Tommy Loughran, Bob Foster, Harold Johnson, Maxie Rosenbloom and Billy Conn. Furthermore, Spinks did what no other light-heavyweight champion had ever done up to that point: move up to win the world heavyweight championship, by decisioning IBF champion Larry Holmes in 1985.

On The Ring Magazine's list of 100 greatest punchers of all time, Spinks was ranked 42nd.

On The Ring Magazine's list of the 80 Best Fighters of the Last 80 Years, released in 2002, Spinks ranked 41st.

East Side Boxing said in its tribute to Spinks, "Michael Spinks went undefeated fighting during the deepest era in Light Heavyweight history. And he beat the real heavyweight champion to win the title, who was also undefeated. Michael Spinks is the most accomplished light heavyweight champion in history."

== Retirement and later years ==
Spinks was once believed to be one of the few top fighters who left the sport of boxing with both a decent amount of money and being seemingly unharmed, free of permanent injuries. However he has shown signs of slurred speech since the 2020s, and he has been in litigation over the loss of his $24 million fortune. Aside from a rare event honoring him and occasionally attending fights, Spinks has largely remained off the boxing scene and out of the public eye. Ken Hissner reported that, "In October 2007 he was introduced into the ring at the Legendary Blue Horizon in Philadelphia. He seemed quite at home in the ring waving and talking to the fans."

Spinks lives on a five-acre spread in Greenville, Delaware. However, he has been known for visiting schools—carrying his gold medal and four title belts—where he tells kids to pursue their dreams. "Most of the kids don't have a clue who I am," he says, "but they listen when they see all the gold."

For years he remained close to his former promoter, Butch Lewis, training fighters and making rare public appearances at events promoted by Lewis.

In 2011, however, after Lewis died from natural causes, it was reported that Spinks had sued Lewis's estate in a Delaware Chancery Court, alleging that the promoter had failed to properly manage more than $24 million Spinks had earned in the ring and had violated their agreements that Lewis would continue to manage Spinks's money and pay his living expenses for the rest of the boxer's life. The lawsuit alleged that he commingled his personal funds with Spinks's and used Spinks's money to pay his and his children's own personal and business expenses. Also named as a defendant was Robert L. Johnson, founder of Black Entertainment Television, head of the real estate firm of RLJ Development LLC, in Bethesda, Maryland, and one of the executors of Lewis's $8.5 million estate.

According to Spinks's lawyers, following Lewis's death Johnson and attorney Leonard Williams stopped the payments without telling him, which in turn caused Spinks's health insurance to lapse and bills totaling up to $50,000 a month to go unpaid. "Spinks had to invade his pension and retirement funds and incur significant taxes and penalties in order to meet these obligations," the boxer's lawyers added in the filings.

Spinks asked that the court bar Johnson and Williams from transferring any further assets from Lewis's estate until there can be a full accounting and payments to Spinks are resumed.

Spinks married gossip columnist Flo Anthony on January 6, 2026, in New York City. The couple dated since 1987. Anthony died exactly seven months after getting married.

== Professional boxing record ==
32 fights	31 wins	1 loss
By knockout	21	1
By decision	10	0

No.	Result	Record	Opponent	Type	Round, time	Date	Location	Notes
32	Loss	31–1	Mike Tyson	KO	1 (12), 1:31	Jun 27, 1988	Convention Hall, Atlantic City, New Jersey, U.S.	Lost The Ring heavyweight title; For WBA, WBC, and IBF heavyweight titles
31	Win	31–0	Gerry Cooney	TKO	5 (15), 2:51	Jun 15, 1987	Convention Hall, Atlantic City, New Jersey, U.S.	Retained The Ring heavyweight title
30	Win	30–0	Steffen Tangstad	TKO	4 (15), 0:58	Sep 6, 1986	Las Vegas Hilton, Winchester, Nevada, U.S.	Retained IBF and The Ring heavyweight titles
29	Win	29–0	Larry Holmes	SD	15	Apr 19, 1986	Las Vegas Hilton, Winchester, Nevada, U.S.	Retained IBF and The Ring heavyweight titles
28	Win	28–0	Larry Holmes	UD	15	Sep 21, 1985	Riviera, Winchester, Nevada, U.S.	Won IBF and The Ring heavyweight titles
27	Win	27–0	Jim MacDonald	TKO	8 (15), 1:30	Jun 6, 1985	Riviera, Winchester, Nevada, U.S.	Retained WBA, WBC, IBF, and The Ring light heavyweight titles
26	Win	26–0	David Sears	TKO	3 (12), 1:02	Feb 23, 1985	Sands, Atlantic City, New Jersey, U.S.	Retained WBA, WBC, IBF, and The Ring light heavyweight titles
25	Win	25–0	Eddie Davis	UD	12	Feb 25, 1984	Steel Pier, Atlantic City, New Jersey, U.S.	Retained WBA, WBC, and The Ring light heavyweight titles; Won inaugural IBF light heavyweight title
24	Win	24–0	Oscar Rivadeneyra	TKO	10 (15), 1:42	Nov 25, 1983	Pacific Coliseum, Vancouver, British Columbia, Canada	Retained WBA, WBC, and The Ring light heavyweight titles
23	Win	23–0	Dwight Muhammad Qawi	UD	15	Mar 18, 1983	Convention Hall, Atlantic City, New Jersey, U.S.	Retained WBA light heavyweight title; Won WBC and The Ring light heavyweight titles
22	Win	22–0	Johnny Davis	TKO	9 (15), 2:27	Sep 18, 1982	Sands, Atlantic City, New Jersey, U.S.	Retained WBA light heavyweight title
21	Win	21–0	Jerry Celestine	TKO	8 (15), 1:58	Jun 12, 1982	Playboy Hotel and Casino, Atlantic City, New Jersey, U.S.	Retained WBA light heavyweight title
20	Win	20–0	Murray Sutherland	TKO	8 (15), 1:24	Apr 11, 1982	Playboy Hotel and Casino, Atlantic City, New Jersey, U.S.	Retained WBA light heavyweight title
19	Win	19–0	Mustafa Wassaja	TKO	6 (15), 1:36	Feb 13, 1982	Playboy Hotel and Casino, Atlantic City, New Jersey, U.S.	Retained WBA light heavyweight title
18	Win	18–0	Vonzell Johnson	TKO	7 (15), 1:13	Nov 7, 1981	Playboy Hotel and Casino, Atlantic City, New Jersey, U.S.	Retained WBA light heavyweight title
17	Win	17–0	Eddie Mustafa Muhammad	UD	15	Jul 18, 1981	Imperial Palace, Paradise, Nevada, U.S.	Won WBA light heavyweight title
16	Win	16–0	Marvin Johnson	KO	4 (10), 1:22	Mar 28, 1981	Steel Pier, Atlantic City, New Jersey, U.S.	
15	Win	15–0	Willie Taylor	TKO	8 (10), 2:40	Jan 24, 1981	Martin Luther King Arena, Philadelphia, Pennsylvania, U.S.	
14	Win	14–0	Yaqui Lopez	TKO	7 (10), 0:46	Oct 18, 1980	Convention Hall, Atlantic City, New Jersey, U.S.	
13	Win	13–0	David Conteh	TKO	9 (10), 2:35	Aug 2, 1980	Riverside Centroplex, Baton Rouge, Louisiana, U.S.	
12	Win	12–0	Murray Sutherland	UD	10	May 4, 1980	Concord Resort Hotel, Thompson, New York, U.S.	
11	Win	11–0	Ramon Ranquello	TKO	6 (10), 3:00	Feb 24, 1980	Steel Pier, Atlantic City, New Jersey, U.S.	
10	Win	10–0	Johnny Wilburn	UD	8	Feb 1, 1980	Louisville Gardens, Louisville, Kentucky, U.S.	
9	Win	9–0	Marc Hans	TKO	1 (8)	Nov 24, 1979	Metropolitan Sports Center, Bloomington, Minnesota, U.S.	
8	Win	8–0	Eddie Phillips	KO	4 (8), 1:33	Dec 15, 1978	Westchester County Center, White Plains, New York, U.S.	
7	Win	7–0	Tom Bethea	UD	8	Feb 15, 1978	Las Vegas Hilton, Winchester, Nevada, U.S.	
6	Win	6–0	Gary Summerhays	UD	8	Oct 22, 1977	The Aladdin, Paradise, Nevada, U.S.	
5	Win	5–0	Ray Elson	KO	1 (8), 0:51	Sep 13, 1977	Grand Olympic Auditorium, Los Angeles, California, U.S.	
4	Win	4–0	Jasper Brisbane	TKO	2 (6), 2:56	Aug 23, 1977	Spectrum, Philadelphia, Pennsylvania, U.S.	
3	Win	3–0	Joe Borden	KO	2 (6), 2:20	Jun 1, 1977	Forum, Montreal, Quebec, Canada	
2	Win	2–0	Luis Rodriguez	UD	6	May 7, 1977	Kiel Auditorium, St. Louis, Missouri, U.S.	
1	Win	1–0	Eddie Benson	TKO	1 (6), 2:55	Apr 16, 1977	The Aladdin, Paradise, Nevada, U.S.	

== Titles in boxing ==
=== Major world titles ===
- WBA light heavyweight champion (175 lbs)
- WBC light heavyweight champion (175 lbs)
- IBF light heavyweight champion (Note: Awarded inaugural title after defeating Eddie Davis on February 25, 1984.) (175 lbs)
- IBF heavyweight champion (200+ lbs)

=== The Ring magazine titles ===
- The Ring light heavyweight champion (175 lbs)
- The Ring heavyweight champion (200+ lbs)

=== Undisputed titles ===
- Undisputed light heavyweight champion

== See also ==
- List of heavyweight boxing champions
- List of light heavyweight boxing champions
- List of WBA world champions
- List of WBC world champions
- List of IBF world champions
- List of The Ring world champions

== Notes ==
Sporting positions
Amateur boxing titles
Previous: Dale Grant	U.S. Golden Gloves light middleweight champion 1974	Next: Ray Phillips
Previous: Tom Sullivan	U.S. Golden Gloves middleweight champion 1976	Next: Keith Broom
World boxing titles
Preceded by Eddie Mustafa Muhammad	WBA light heavyweight champion July 18, 1981 – November 5, 1985; Vacated	Vacant Title next held by Marvin Johnson
Preceded by Dwight Muhammad Qawi	WBC light heavyweight champion March 18, 1983 – October 9, 1985; Vacated	Vacant Title next held by J. B. Williamson
Preceded by Dwight Muhammad Qawi	The Ring light heavyweight champion March 18, 1983 – November 5, 1985; Vacated	Vacant Title next held by Roy Jones Jr.
Vacant Title last held by Bob Foster	Undisputed light heavyweight champion March 18, 1983 – October 9, 1985; Titles fragmented	Vacant Title next held by Roy Jones Jr.
Inaugural champion	IBF light heavyweight champion February 25, 1984 – November 5, 1985; Vacated	Vacant Title next held by Slobodan Kačar
Preceded by Larry Holmes	IBF heavyweight champion September 21, 1985 – February 19, 1987; Stripped	Vacant Title next held by Tony Tucker
Preceded by Larry Holmes	The Ring heavyweight champion September 21, 1985 – June 27, 1988	Succeeded by Mike Tyson
Awards
Previous: Muhammad Ali and Joe Frazier	BWAA Fighter of the Year; 1976; With: Howard Davis Jr., Leon Spinks, Leo Randolph, and Sugar Ray Leonard	Next: Ken Norton
Previous: Gene Hatcher; TKO11 Johnny Bumphus	The Ring Upset of the Year; UD15 Larry Holmes; 1985	Next: Lloyd Honeyghan; RTD6 Donald Curry
