= Richie Giachetti =

American boxing trainer

Richie Giachetti (April 20, 1940 – February 3, 2016) was an American boxing trainer who worked with a number of world champions including Larry Holmes and Mike Tyson.

He was born in Uniontown, Pennsylvania. Giachetti first began working in boxing in 1961 and also helped Don King in his first promotion with Muhammad Ali.

Most famous for guiding Holmes to the heavyweight championship, he trained many other top fighters of the 1970s and 1980s including Earnie Shavers, Aaron Pryor and Greg Page.

When Mike Tyson was dethroned as heavyweight champion by James "Buster" Douglas in 1990 in a 10th-round knockout in Tokyo, King inserted Giachetti as Tyson's trainer. Giachetti trained Tyson for his next four fights, those against Henry Tillman, Alex Stewart, and the two fights against Donovan "Razor" Ruddock. Giachetti later returned to Tyson's corner for his second fight against Evander Holyfield, the infamous "bite fight".

Giachetti also trained two times world cruiserweight champion Jean Marc Mormeck and worked with another top cruiserweight Steve Cunningham and Sal Cenicola in the late 1980s.

He worked on several Sylvester Stallone movies and worked with Stallone on boxing promotions in the New York City area. Giachetti died February 3, 2016, at the age of 75 in Lodi, Ohio.
