= Gerry Cooney =

American boxer (born 1956)

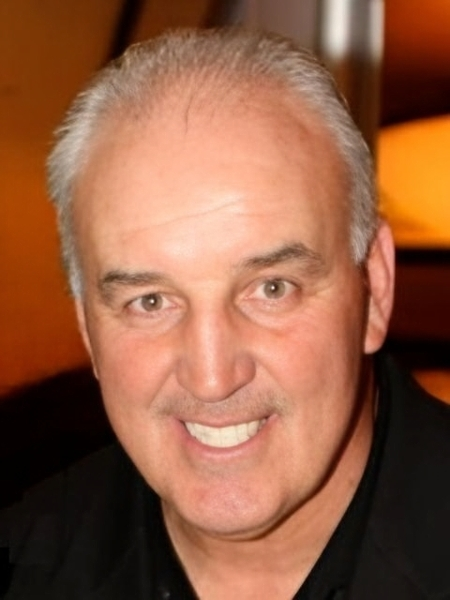
- Cooney in 2011

Personal information
- Nickname: Gentleman
- Born: Gerald Arthur Cooney; August 24, 1956 (age 70) Manhattan, New York City, New York, U.S.
- Height: 6 ft 6 in (198 cm)
- Weight: Heavyweight

Boxing career
- Reach: 81 in (206 cm)
- Stance: Orthodox

Boxing record
- Total fights: 31
- Wins: 28
- Win by KO: 24
- Losses: 3

Gerald Arthur Cooney (born August 24, 1956) is an American former professional boxer who competed from 1977 to 1990. He challenged twice for world heavyweight titles in 1982 and 1987. He is widely regarded as one of the hardest punchers in heavyweight history. He beat Ken Norton, S. T. Gordon, Ron Lyle, and Jimmy Young late in their careers. He boasts an 85.7% knockout to win percentage.

== Early life ==
Born into a blue collar Irish-Catholic family on Long Island, Cooney was encouraged to become a professional fighter by his father. His brother Tommy Cooney was also a boxer, and reached the finals of the New York Golden Gloves Sub-Novice Heavyweight division. Cooney's grandparents lived in Placentia, Newfoundland, in Canada.

During a 2026 interview on The New Jersey Hall of Fame podcast with Steve Edwards, Cooney mentioned that his paternal great grandmother was African-American.

== Amateur career ==
Fighting as an amateur, Gerry Cooney won international tournaments in England, Wales, and Scotland, as well as the New York Golden Gloves titles. He won two New York Golden Gloves Championships, the 1973 160-lb (72.6 kg) Sub-Novice Championship and the 1976 Heavyweight Open Championship. Cooney defeated Larry Derrick to win the 1973 160-lb (72.6 kg) Sub-Novice title, and Earlous Tripp to win the 1976 Heavyweight Open title. In 1975 he reached the finals of the 175-lb (79.4 kg) Open division, but was defeated by Johnny Davis.

Cooney trained at the Huntington Athletic Club in Long Island, New York, where his trainer was John Capobianco. His amateur record consisted of 55 wins and 3 losses.

When he turned professional, Cooney signed with co-managers Mike Jones and Dennis Rappaport. He was trained by Victor Valle.

== Professional career ==
Known for his big left-hook and his imposing size, the tall, lean Cooney had his first paid fight on February 15, 1977, beating Billy Jackson by a knockout in one round. Nine wins followed and Cooney gained attention as a future contender, although his opponents were carefully chosen. He moved up a weight class and fought future world cruiserweight champion S. T. Gordon in Las Vegas, winning by a fourth round disqualification. Cooney had 11 more wins, spanning 1978 and 1979. Among those he defeated were Charlie Polite, Eddie Lopez, and Tom Prater. These were not rated contenders, however.

By 1980, Cooney was being featured on national television. Stepping up, he beat one-time title challengers Jimmy Young and Ron Lyle, both by 'knockouts.' The Young fight was stopped because of cuts sustained by Young. By then Cooney was ranked number 1 by the WBC and eager for a match with champion Larry Holmes.

In 1981, he defeated former world heavyweight champion Ken Norton by a knockout just 54 seconds into the first round with a blisteringly powerful attack. This tied the record set in 1948 by Lee Savold for the quickest knockout in a main event in Madison Square Garden. Since his management team was unwilling to risk losing a big future pay day with Holmes by having him face another viable fighter, Cooney did not fight for 13 months after defeating Norton.

The following year, Holmes agreed to fight him with the fight held June 11, 1982. With a purse of ten million dollars for the challenger, it was the richest fight in boxing history to that time. The promotion of the fight took on racial overtones that were exaggerated by the promoters, something Cooney did not agree with. He believed that skill, not race, should determine if a boxer was good. However, if Cooney won, he would have become the first white world heavyweight champion since Swede Ingemar Johansson defeated Floyd Patterson 23 years earlier. Don King called Cooney "The Great White Hope." The bout, held June 11, 1982 drew attention worldwide, and Larry Holmes vs. Gerry Cooney was one of the biggest closed-circuit/pay-per-view productions in history, broadcast to over 150 countries.

Cooney was knocked down briefly in the second round, and was fined three points for repeated low blows against Holmes. After 12 rounds, Holmes finally wore him down. In round 13, Cooney's trainer Victor Valle stepped into the ring, forcing the referee to stop the fight. Two of the three judges would have had Cooney ahead after the 12th round if it weren't for the point deductions. Holmes and Cooney became friends after the fight, a relationship that endured for them. On December 14, 1982, Cooney fought Harold Rice, the heavyweight champion of Connecticut, in a four-round bout. No winner was declared, so Cooney told the crowd following the bout: "This is only an exhibition. I'm sorry if I disappointed anybody. I'm trying to work myself back in shape so I can knock out Larry Holmes. Everything is OK. I felt a little rusty, but that is normal. It has been a while. I felt good in front of the people."

After a long layoff, Cooney fought in September, 1984, beating Phillip Brown by a 4th-round knockout in Anchorage, Alaska. He fought once more that year and won, but personal problems kept him out of the ring.

Although Cooney had only fought three official bouts in five years following his loss to Holmes, in 1987 he challenged former world heavyweight and world light heavyweight champion Michael Spinks in a title bout. Cooney appeared past his prime and Spinks, boxing carefully with constant sharp counters, knocked him out in round 5. Cooney's last fight was in 1990. He was knocked out in a match-up of power-punching veterans in two rounds by former world champion George Foreman. Cooney did stagger Foreman in the first round, but he was over-matched, and Foreman knocked him out two minutes into the second round.

The losses to Holmes, Spinks, and Foreman exposed Cooney's Achilles' heel: his inability to clinch and tie up his opponent when hurt. In the Foreman fight, he rose from a second-round knockdown and stood in the center of the ring as Foreman delivered the coup de grâce. Cooney was also notorious for his poor footwork.

Cooney compiled a professional record of 28 wins and 3 losses, with 24 knockouts. None of his 10 to 15-round fights went the distance. He is ranked number 53 on The Ring's list of "100 Greatest Punchers of All Time".

== Fighting style ==
Cooney, who is naturally left-handed, used an orthodox stance like Oscar De La Hoya. This provided him with a powerful jab and a lethal left hook, but a comparatively weaker right, which he seldom used except in combinations. Most of his fights ended in quick knockouts; while this benefited him in the beginning of his career, it left him unprepared for his fight against world heavyweight champion Larry Holmes. Despite his devastating punching power, Cooney's moderate stamina and lack of experience proved to be his downfall.

Cooney's left-hook is described as one of the most powerful punches in boxing history.

Cooney was known for not throwing punches at the head, aiming instead for his opponent's chest, ribs, or stomach. This made him vulnerable at times, the fight against Holmes being an example.

According to George Foreman, Gerry Cooney was one of the three hardest punchers he had faced in his career along with Ron Lyle and Cleveland Williams.

== Life after boxing ==
Cooney founded the Fighters' Initiative for Support and Training, an organization which helps retired boxers find jobs. He did not encourage the racially charged promotion of the Holmes vs. Cooney match and became good friends with his former rival Holmes in the years afterward.

Cooney is deeply involved in J.A.B., the first union for boxers. He became a boxing promoter for title bouts featuring Roberto Durán, Héctor Camacho, and George Foreman. Cooney is a supporter of the "hands are not for hitting" program, which tries to prevent domestic violence. He guides young fighters in the gym.

In June 2010, Cooney became the co-host of "Friday Night at the Fights" on SIRIUS XM Radio.

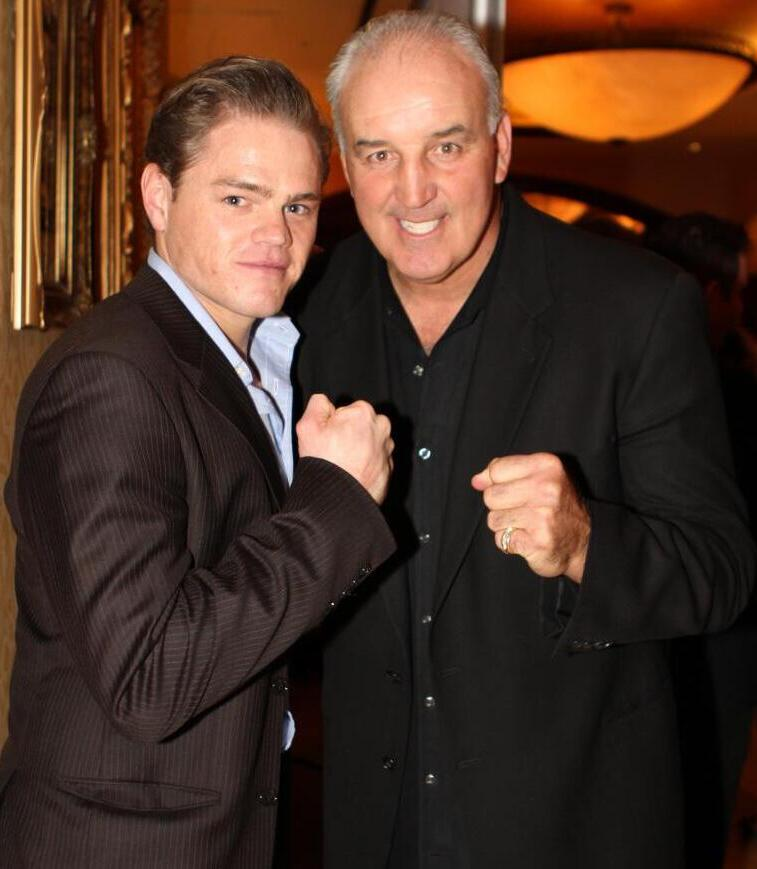
Cooney (right) with Devin Harjes, 2011

Cooney resides in Fanwood, New Jersey, with his wife Jennifer and their three children.

== In popular media ==
- He guest-starred as himself in the 1993 The Simpsons episode "$pringfield (or, How I Learned to Stop Worrying and Love Legalized Gambling)", where he works as a greeter at the casino owned by Mr. Burns.
- In Season 5 Ep 21 of 30 Rock (100: Part 2), Dean Winters' character, Dennis Duffy, claims to have attended an elementary school named "Gerry Cooney Elementary".
- Jay Munly included a song titled "Cooney vs. Munly" on his 2002 album, Jimmy Carter Syndrome.

== Honors ==
- Cooney has been inducted into the Hall of Fame at Walt Whitman High School (New York), where he graduated.

== Professional boxing record ==
31 fights	28 wins	3 losses
By knockout	24	3
By decision	3	0
By disqualification	1	0

No.	Result	Record	Opponent	Type	Round, time	Date	Location	Notes
31	Loss	28–3	George Foreman	KO	2 (10), 1:57	Jan 15, 1990	Convention Hall, Atlantic City, New Jersey, U.S.	
30	Loss	28–2	Michael Spinks	TKO	5 (15), 2:51	Jun 15, 1987	Convention Hall, Atlantic City, New Jersey, U.S.	For The Ring heavyweight title
29	Win	28–1	Eddie Gregg	KO	1 (10), 1:26	May 31, 1986	Cow Palace, San Francisco, California, U.S.	
28	Win	27–1	George Chaplin	TKO	2 (10), 2:50	Dec 8, 1984	Veterans Memorial Coliseum, Phoenix, Arizona, U.S.	
27	Win	26–1	Philipp Brown	TKO	4 (10), 2:37	Sep 29, 1984	Sullivan Arena, Anchorage, Alaska, U.S.	
26	Loss	25–1	Larry Holmes	TKO	13 (15), 2:52	Jun 11, 1982	Caesars Palace, Paradise, Nevada, U.S.	For WBC and The Ring heavyweight title
25	Win	25–0	Ken Norton	TKO	1 (10), 0:54	May 11, 1981	Madison Square Garden, New York City, New York, U.S.	
24	Win	24–0	Ron Lyle	KO	1 (10), 2:49	Oct 24, 1980	Nassau Veterans Memorial Coliseum, Hempstead, New York, U.S.	
23	Win	23–0	Jimmy Young	TKO	4 (10), 3:00	May 25, 1980	Convention Hall, Atlantic City, New Jersey, U.S.	
22	Win	22–0	Leroy Boone	TKO	6 (10), 0:55	Dec 14, 1979	Convention Hall, Atlantic City, New Jersey, U.S.	
21	Win	21–0	John Dino Denis	TKO	3 (10), 1:14	Nov 9, 1979	Madison Square Garden, New York City, New York, U.S.	
20	Win	20–0	Malik Dozier	KO	6 (10)	Oct 9, 1979	Long Island Arena, Commack, New York, U.S.	
19	Win	19–0	Broderick Mason	KO	4 (10), 1:44	Aug 22, 1979	Felt Forum, New York City, New York, U.S.	
18	Win	18–0	Tom Prater	TKO	2 (10), 2:13	Jun 29, 1979	Felt Forum, New York City, New York, U.S.	
17	Win	17–0	Charlie Johnson	KO	1 (10), 1:51	Feb 26, 1979	Felt Forum, New York City, New York, U.S.	
16	Win	16–0	Eddie Lopez	UD	8	Jan 13, 1979	Convention Center, Miami Beach, Florida, U.S.	
15	Win	15–0	Grady Daniels	RTD	5 (8)	Dec 15, 1978	Felt Forum, New York City, New York, U.S.	
14	Win	14–0	Sam McGill	UD	8	Nov 1, 1978	Westchester County Center, White Plains, New York, U.S.	
13	Win	13–0	Charley Polite	KO	4 (8)	Oct 4, 1978	Westchester County Center, White Plains, New York, U.S.	
12	Win	12–0	G. G. Maldonado	TKO	8 (8), 2:56	Jun 22, 1978	Madison Square Garden, New York City, New York, U.S.	
11	Win	11–0	S. T. Gordon	DQ	4 (10), 1:34	Mar 17, 1978	The Aladdin, Paradise, Nevada, U.S.	Gordon disqualified for repeated holding
10	Win	10–0	Gary Bates	KO	4 (6)	Feb 11, 1978	Las Vegas Hilton, Winchester, Nevada, U.S.	
9	Win	9–0	Austin Johnson	KO	1 (6), 1:23	Jan 27, 1978	Calderone Concert Hall, Hempstead, New York, U.S.	
8	Win	8–0	Terry Lee Kidd	KO	1 (6)	Jan 14, 1978	Colonie Hill, Hauppauge, New York, U.S.	
7	Win	7–0	Jimmie Sykes	KO	1 (6)	Dec 21, 1977	Roll-O Rama, New York City, New York, U.S.	
6	Win	6–0	Quinnie Locklear	KO	1 (6), 1:51	Nov 30, 1977	Westchester County Center, White Plains, New York, U.S.	
5	Win	5–0	Joe Maye	KO	4 (6), 2:15	Nov 18, 1977	Madison Square Garden, New York City, New York, U.S.	
4	Win	4–0	Matt Robinson	PTS	4	Aug 3, 1977	Madison Square Garden, New York City, New York, U.S.	
3	Win	3–0	Jose Rosario	KO	2 (6), 2:10	Mar 20, 1977	Exposition Center, Louisville, Kentucky, U.S.	
2	Win	2–0	Jimmy Robertson	KO	2 (6), 1:58	Mar 2, 1977	Madison Square Garden, New York City, New York, U.S.	
1	Win	1–0	Bill Jackson	KO	1 (6), 1:32	Feb 15, 1977	Sunnyside Garden Arena, New York City, New York, U.S.	

== Exhibition boxing record ==
2 fights	1 win	0 losses
By knockout	1	0
Non-scored	1	

No.	Result	Record	Opponent	Type	Round, time	Date	Location	Notes
2	Win	1–0 (1)	Boone Kirkman	TKO	3 (4)	Feb 11, 1983	Eugene, Oregon, U.S.	
1	—N/a	0–0 (1)	Harold Rice	—N/a	4	Dec 14, 1982	Pasadena, Texas, U.S.	Non-scored bout
