= Butch Lewis =

Boxing promoter and manager (1946–2011)

Ronald "Butch" Everett Lewis (June 26, 1946 – July 23, 2011) was an American boxing promoter and manager. He is best known for managing the careers of boxing brothers Leon and Michael Spinks.

== Early life ==
Lewis was born in Woodbury, New Jersey, but raised in Philadelphia, Pennsylvania. He made many close friends such as Denzel Washington and former BET owner Bob Johnson, among the many celebrities Lewis associated with throughout his years as a promoter.

== Career ==
Lewis ran Butch Lewis Productions. He is most remembered for inking a deal between former Olympic medalist/heavyweight champion Michael Spinks and legendary knockout artist Mike Tyson in 1988. Spinks, Lewis' client at the time, made $13.5 million in the fight, despite being knocked out by Tyson in the first round.

Lewis also served as a co-promoter for a few Muhammad Ali fights in the late 1970s, including the famous 1978 bout when Ali fell to Lewis' client, Leon Spinks.

Other memorable moments of Lewis' career include the night former boxing champ Dwight Muhammad Qawi changed his mind at the last second on taking a fight Lewis had set up, costing him "a fortune."

Henry "Discombobulating" Jones, the first known Black boxing ring announcer, told the AFRO he had the luxury of getting to know Butch over the years. Jones said Lewis had promised him he would hire him as a ring announcer for one of the major fights he had thrown.

"Butch had put together a major fight that was held at the famous Apollo Hall in Harlem, but he ended up hiring a White announcer to announce the fight, so I called and left a voicemail," Jones said. "But Butch called me back immediately, apologizing. He told me he genuinely forgot about me and said to blame it on his head, not his heart."

Jones said he forgave Lewis because he knew he was "an honest man," even when it came to business. "Butch had a unique personality and a generous spirit," Jones said, adding that he would be deeply missed and long remembered for his contributions.

== Later life ==
Lewis was honored in 2004 when South African president Nelson Mandela presented him with the nation's highest humanitarian award for his advocating contributions made throughout the 1970s and 1980s. Lewis had led a boycott against the apartheid in South Africa, requesting leaders of boxing organizations not to sanction South African fights until apartheid was abolished. When Mandela was released in 1990, Lewis worked closely with him to raise funds for his African National Congress (ANC) party.

Lewis was also awarded an honorary doctorate degree in 2007 from Morehouse College for funding several students' paths through college, via the Butch Lewis Foundation Scholarship Fund.

== Death ==
Lewis died of a heart attack at his home in Bethany Beach, Delaware.
