= Mike Tyson vs. James Smith =

Boxing competition

Super Fight
- Date: March 7, 1987
- Venue: Las Vegas Hilton, Paradise, Nevada
- Title(s) on the line: WBA and WBC heavyweight titles

Tale of the tape
Boxer	Mike Tyson	James Smith
Nickname	Iron	Bonecrusher
Hometown	Catskill, New York	Magnolia, North Carolina
Purse	$1,500,000	$1,000,000
Pre-fight record	28–0 (26 KO)	19–5 (14 KO)
Age	20 years, 8 months	33 years, 11 months
Height	5 ft 10 in (178 cm)	6 ft 4 in (193 cm)
Weight	219 lb (99 kg)	233 lb (106 kg)
Style	Orthodox	Orthodox
Recognition	WBC; Heavyweight Champion; The Ring; No. 1 Ranked Heavyweight	WBA; Heavyweight Champion; The Ring; No. 2 Ranked Heavyweight

Result
- Tyson wins via 12-round unanimous decision (120-106, 119-107, 119-107)

Mike Tyson vs. James Smith, billed as Super Fight, was a professional boxing match contested on March 7, 1987 for the WBA and WBC heavyweight championships, as part of the heavyweight unification series.

== Background ==
Mike Tyson was coming off a dominating victory over Trevor Berbick in which he captured the WBC Heavyweight championship after knocking out Berbick in the second round. Tyson's next opponent would be the WBA Heavyweight champion James "Bonecrusher" Smith, who had knocked out Tim Witherspoon in the first round to capture the title four months earlier. The stakes for the fight were high as not only would the winner unify the WBA and WBC titles, but they would also get to face undefeated IBF Heavyweight champion Michael Spinks to determine the next Undisputed Heavyweight champion. However, only a month before the fight, Spinks would vacate his IBF title, instead choosing to defend his remaining Lineal Heavyweight championship against Gerry Cooney, temporarily putting plans to find the next Undisputed Heavyweight Champion on hold.

== The fight ==
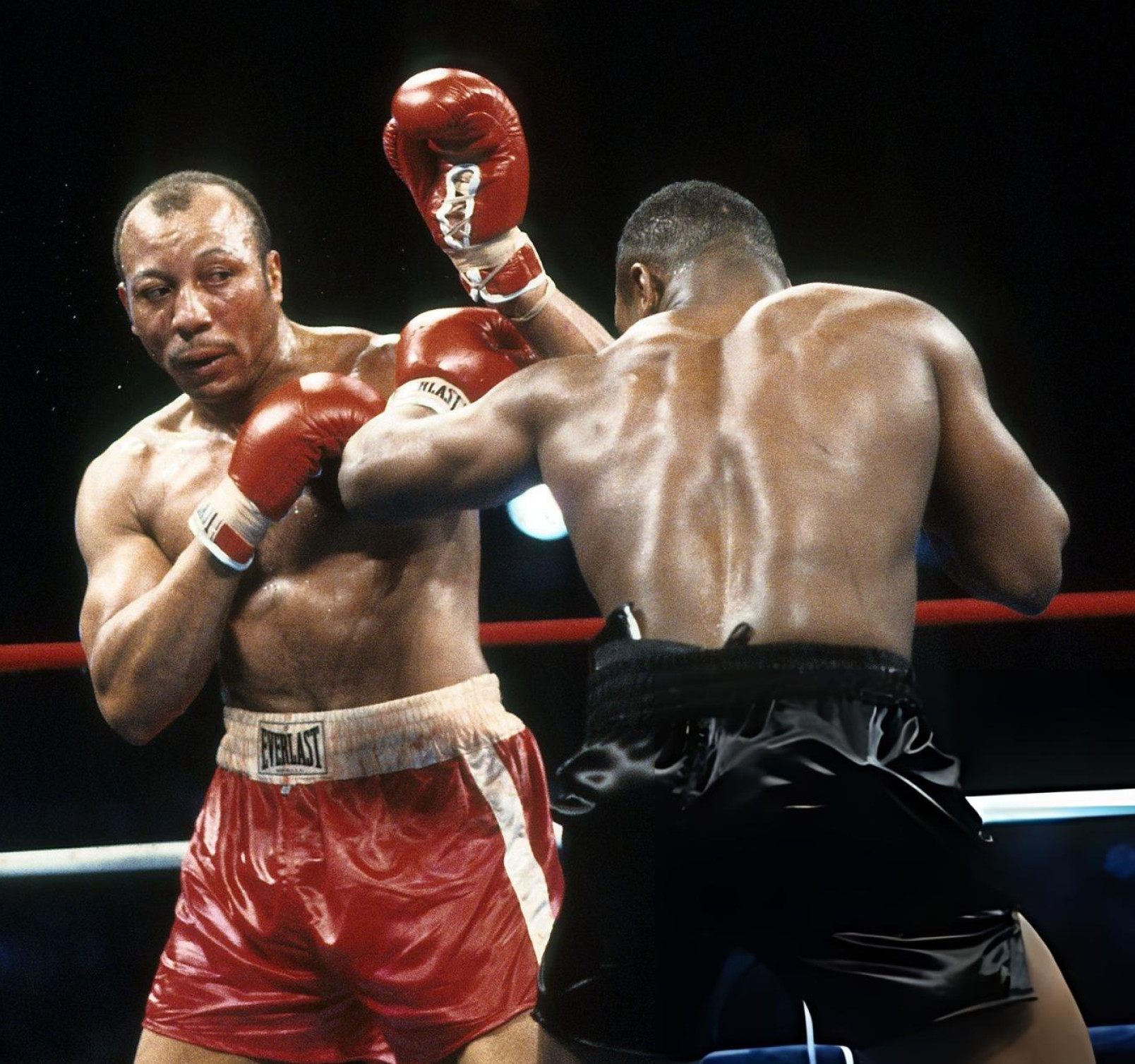

Though Smith became one of the few men to last the entire 12 rounds with Tyson, he offered little offense during the fight, instead constantly grappling with Tyson in an effort to reduce the effectiveness of Tyson's punches. Because of the excessive holding, referee Mills Lane twice took a point away from Smith, first in second round, and then again in the eighth. Smith's best offensive pressure arguably was during the fight's final seconds in which he was able to land a right hand to the head of Tyson. Tyson would earn the victory by way of unanimous decision, winning every round on all three of the judges scorecards. Afterwards, Tyson was critical of Smith's tactics, "When I was trying to put the punches together he grabbed. This hurts boxing. This is show business. People expect a performance"

== Aftermath ==
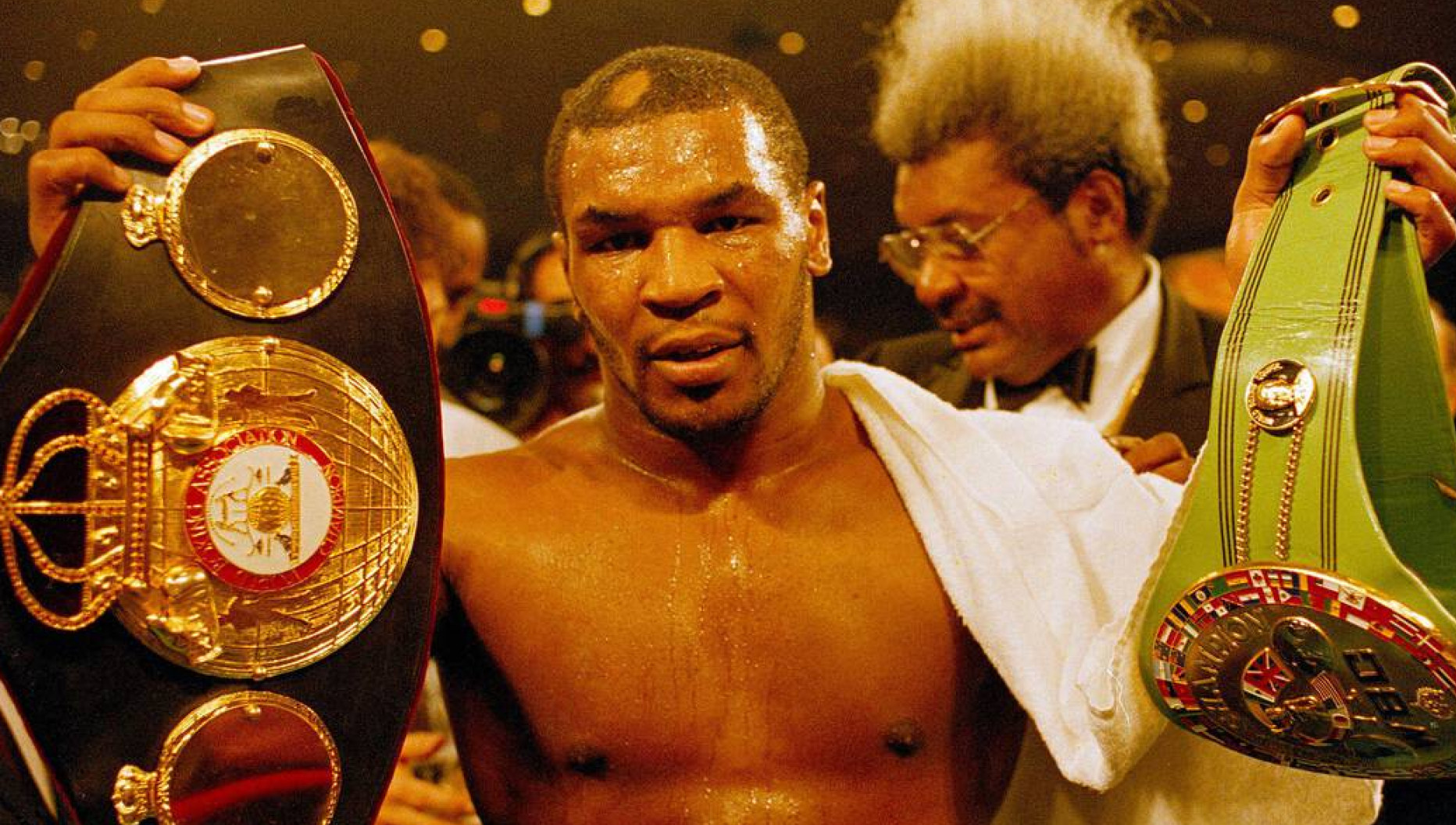
Tyson after the fight

Mike Tyson would next defend his title against former WBC champ Pinklon Thomas, earning the victory by way of 6th round technical knockout. Meanwhile, the IBF organized a match between Tony Tucker and a then-unknown James "Buster" Douglas to determine who would be their heavyweight champion, with Tucker dispatching Douglas in the 10th round by technical knockout. This would set up the much anticipated Tyson–Tucker fight to determine the next undisputed champion. For the second time in three fights, Tyson went the full 12 rounds, eventually defeating Tucker by unanimous decision.

== Undercard ==
Confirmed bouts:

- Tyrell Biggs knocks out David Bey at 2:18 of round 6
- Azumah Nelson knocks out Mauro Gutierrez in Round 6 to retain his WBC Featherweight Title.

== Broadcasting ==
Country	Broadcaster
United Kingdom	ITV
United States	HBO

Preceded by vs. Trevor Berbick	Mike Tyson's bouts March 7, 1987	Succeeded by vs. Pinklon Thomas
Preceded by vs. Tim Witherspoon II	James Smith's bouts March 7, 1987	Succeeded by vs. Adílson Rodrigues
