= Larry Holmes vs. Carl Williams =

- Date: May 20, 1985
- Venue: Lawlor Events Center, Reno, Nevada
- Title(s) on the line: IBF, The Ring and lineal world heavyweight championships

Tale of the tape
Boxer	Larry Holmes	Carl Williams
Nickname	The Easton Assassin	The Truth
Hometown	Easton, Pennsylvania	White Plains, New York
Pre-fight record	48-0	16-0
Age	35	25
Height	6 ft 3 in (191 cm)	6 ft 4 in (193 cm)
Weight	224.25 lb (102 kg)	215 lb (98 kg)
Style	orthodox	orthodox
Recognition	IBF, The Ring, and lineal world champion	

Result
- Holmes defeats Williams by unanimous decision

Larry Holmes vs. Carl Williams was a professional boxing match that was contested on May 20, 1985, at the Lawlor Events Center on the campus of the University of Nevada in Reno, Nevada, USA. The contest was fought for Holmes' International Boxing Federation world heavyweight championship, as well as for the The Ring and lineal world championships.

Holmes emerged victorious in a controversial unanimous decision victory over Williams.

== Background ==
=== Larry Holmes ===
Entering the fight, Holmes had been reigning as the world heavyweight champion in some form or another since he defeated Ken Norton for the World Boxing Council championship in 1978 after Leon Spinks was stripped of the title for pursuing a rematch with Muhammad Ali rather than face mandatory challenger Norton. He then went on to make sixteen successful defenses of the championship over the course of the next five years, defeating former champions Spinks and Ali as well as future champions Trevor Berbick and Tim Witherspoon along the way.

In 1983, Holmes was ordered by the WBC to make a mandatory defense against Greg Page. Instead, he opted to pursue a fight with Marvis Frazier, which prompted the WBC to refuse to sanction the bout as a title fight. Shortly after the Frazier fight, which took place in November 1983, Holmes was stripped of the WBC championship but continued to be recognized as the Ring and lineal champion. However, in the same month that Holmes had fought Frazier, the United States Boxing Association had decided to begin sanctioning world championship matches and had changed its name to the International Boxing Federation. Holmes was offered recognition as the IBF's inaugural world heavyweight champion, and he accepted as the year closed.

In November 1984, in his first fight since the Frazier fight, Holmes took on future World Boxing Association world champion James "Bonecrusher" Smith in the first ever IBF world heavyweight championship fight, which he won by knockout in the twelfth round. He then fought David Bey in March 1985, again in Las Vegas, where he won by a tenth-round knockout. Those two victories were the 46th and 47th of Holmes' career, as well as the seventeenth and eighteenth successful defenses of his world championship reign. Holmes also had yet to be defeated in his professional career.

=== Carl Williams ===
Williams, nicknamed "The Truth", was a former New York Golden Gloves champion and world amateur champion as a heavyweight that turned professional in 1982. He won his first fight in January of that year, and then won fourteen more fights before facing former WBA title challenger James "Quick" Tillis in October 1984 in Atlantic City. Winning a unanimous decision in a ten-round fight, Williams then set his sights on Holmes and the world championship.

== Fight information ==
=== Officials ===
Mills Lane was the referee for the Holmes-Williams match. This was his sixth time refereeing a championship match involving Holmes, as he had been the official for Holmes' fights against Norton, Witherspoon, Berbick, Spinks, and Gerry Cooney. The officials scoring the contest at ringside were Jerry Roth, Paul Gibbs, and Al Rothenburg.

=== Broadcasting ===
The fight was aired on NBC in the United States. The host for the evening was Dick Enberg while the network's boxing broadcast team of Marv Albert and Ferdie Pacheco were on the call.

== The fight ==
Williams took the fight to Holmes early despite getting cut in the third round. By the midway point of the fight, it looked likely that Holmes would lose the championship he had held for nearly seven years; Albert noted on the broadcast that Holmes was said not to have taken his training seriously leading into the fight and the effects might have been starting to show. Holmes, meanwhile, was warned multiple times by Lane to punch with closed fists as he had poked Williams in the eye with his thumb at least once.

Williams began to tire in the later rounds, as he had not been in a fight beyond the tenth round to this point in his career. Holmes was able to take advantage, jabbing away at Williams and slowly gaining an advantage back. With the fight apparently still in doubt as the final four rounds approached, Holmes kept attacking and hurt Williams in the fourteenth. He kept pressing against the exhausted challenger in the final round.

Ring announcer Ed Derian then read the score totals, with Roth scoring the fight 143–142 and Gibbs and Rothenberg each scoring it 146–139, all for Holmes. The crowd in the arena loudly booed the decision, especially for Gibbs and Rothenberg's score totals which gave Holmes eleven rounds to Williams' four. After the fight, Williams said in an interview that he believed he had won the fight and that the worst he could have seen happen was that it would end in a draw.

== Aftermath ==
With the victory, Holmes extended his career record to 48 wins without a loss. It was his nineteenth successful defense of his world championship, but it would be his last. In his very next fight, Holmes was challenged by reigning light heavyweight champion Michael Spinks; in a fight where Holmes would have tied Rocky Marciano for the most consecutive victories to start a career in boxing, it was instead Spinks that made history by becoming the first reigning light heavyweight champion to win the world heavyweight championship when he won a unanimous decision in a fight that some believed Holmes won. Holmes would fight Spinks in a rematch the following year, but after losing via split decision he decided to retire. His retirement did not last long as he attempted to join the ranks of champions that regained the heavyweight title after losing it when he faced Mike Tyson, who had unified the major world championships, in 1988; Tyson knocked out Holmes in the fourth round, the first and only time in his career he would be knocked out. Holmes retired again after the fight but resumed his career full-time in 1991.

Williams returned to the ring to face the unbeaten Jesse Ferguson three months after he faced Holmes and won by technical knockout in the final round. In his next fight, he challenged Mike Weaver and was knocked out himself in the second round. Williams then took over a year off before fighting Bert Cooper for the vacant United States Boxing Association heavyweight championship as part of a nationally televised CBS Sports event, which he won when Cooper failed to answer the bell after seven rounds. Williams would get one more shot at the world heavyweight championship when he faced Tyson in 1989; Tyson knocked Williams out in the first round of what would be his own last successful defense of his world championship, as he would be knocked out by Buster Douglas in his next fight. Williams would continue to defend his USBA championship successfully until 1991, when he lost a split decision to Tim Witherspoon. Williams would face three future world championship contenders before his career was done. He fought future World Boxing Organization champion Tommy Morrison in 1993 but was knocked out in the eighth round in a fight he was winning on two of the judges' scorecards; he followed this up with a fight against British heavyweight and future world champion Frank Bruno, where he survived to the tenth round before being knocked out, and then suffered a seventh-round knockout loss to Russian challenger Alexander Zolkin. Williams would continue fighting until 1997, losing his last fight by knockout against Anthony Green in an eight-round fight.

== Undercard ==
The Holmes-Williams fight was the main event of a five fight card, with every bout except one featuring heavyweights. The only one that did not saw former world featherweight and super featherweight world champion Bobby Chacon knock out Davey Montana in a lightweight bout in the eighth round.

Future world title challenger Bert Cooper won the opening bout by knocking out journeyman Larry Givens in three rounds. Philipp Brown, coming off two consecutive losses to Cooney and Bruno, knocked out previously undefeated Rodney Frazier in the eighth round in their fight. Two of Holmes' former challengers, Marvis Frazier and Randall "Tex" Cobb, also fought on the card; Frazier defeated James Tillis by unanimous decision despite taking a standing eight-count in the second round, while Cobb was knocked down once in a unanimous decision defeat to Eddie Gregg.
