= Octavio Meyran =

Mexican boxing referee

Octavio Meyran Sanchez is a Mexican former boxing referee.

During his career Meyran officiated at over twenty-seven world title fights including the No Más fight between Roberto Durán and Sugar Ray Leonard in 1980, Wilfredo Gómez's WBC Featherweight title-winning match against Juan Laporte, Gomez's loss in his first defense of that title to Azumah Nelson, and Buster Douglas' upset win over Mike Tyson in 1990. After the fight, Meyran was accused by Tyson's manager Don King of giving Douglas a "slow count".
