= The distance (boxing) =

Maximum number of rounds in a boxing match

The distance, in boxing, refers to the full number of rounds in a match. It is frequently used in the expression "going the distance", which means fighting a full bout without being knocked out.

In title fights, this is called "the championship distance", which once was 15 rounds but today usually means 12 rounds (See history section), though there were some ten-round championship matches. Non-title fights can be of any length under 12 rounds but are typically 10 rounds or fewer. Women's championship boxing is ten rounds or fewer, each round lasting 2 minutes instead of 3 for men.

== History ==
In the early days of bare-knuckle boxing, there was no limit on the number of rounds and so matches would be fought to a conclusion (i.e. with a knockout or tap out). For example, the match between Simon Byrne and James 'Deaf' Burke in 1833 lasted 3¼ hours.

Subsequently, laws and rules were passed to prevent such protracted bouts. When John L. Sullivan made boxing under Queensberry rules with gloved hands popular, his matches were of a pre-determined length and the referee would decide the winner if they went the distance. If a match reached the prescribed limit without a formal result then the result would be "no-decision", though one boxer might be considered the winner by popular acclaim—a "newspaper decision". To regulate such results better, official judges were appointed to award points so that a technical winner could be determined. For a period, titles in many US states could not be lost if the match went the distance.

For amateur boxing, the Amateur Boxing Association of England set rules for the length of a match when it was formed in 1880. Initially there were three rounds of 3 minutes with a break of 1 minute between them. Changes were made in 1926 and 1997 and most recently, in 2000, the International Boxing Association (AIBA) made it four rounds of two minutes each. Under current rules by World Boxing, the currently recognised governing body of "Olympic-style boxing," all contests (men or women) are held at three rounds of three minutes each. Junior contests (under 17) are held at two minutes, regardless of gender

=== Championships shortened - Kim (1982) and Double Fatality in Japan (2025) ===
In professional boxing, until the 1980s, the "championship distance" generally referred to the title rounds that numbered between 13 and 15. For decades, the last heavyweight title match scheduled for fewer than 15 rounds had been the September 22, 1927 10-rounder between Gene Tunney and Jack Dempsey. From then on, the only bout that was not scheduled for 15 rounds had been a scheduled 20-rounder between Joe Louis and Abe Simon on March 21, 1941. This changed though, following the death of lightweight Duk Koo Kim in 1982 after his fourteen-round fight with Ray Mancini. Almost immediately, the World Boxing Council (WBC) issued a statement saying that WBC world title bouts would be set for 12 rounds.

The following year on March 27, 1983, the first ever heavyweight title fight scheduled for 12 rounds under that rule was held by the WBC between Larry Holmes and Lucien Rodriguez. The World Boxing Association, from which the World Boxing Organization had not yet separated, later followed suit by voting to reduce their championship distances to 12 rounds on October 19, 1987. While the International Boxing Federation, which had recently broken away from the WBA, continued to hold onto the position there was no documented medical evidence to show a 15-round fight is more dangerous than a 12-round fight, they eventually voted to shorten their championship distance to 12 rounds as well on June 3, 1988.

The last scheduled heavyweight 15-rounder title fight was on October 16, 1987 between Mike Tyson and Tyrell Biggs. The last middleweight 15-rounder title fight was a World Boxing Board title match on June 7, 1997 in which Jose Alfredo Flores won a split decision over Eric Holland in Ruidoso, New Mexico.

In recent years, there have been calls to return the championship distance to 15 rounds. For example, the debate following the Bernard Hopkins vs. Jermain Taylor fight on July 16, 2005 questioned whether Taylor, who was "losing steam" in the later rounds, would have won the title match were it a 15-round bout.

Following two fatalities in separate contests during an August 2, 2025 card in Japan, the Japan Boxing Commission set a limit of ten rounds on championship contests, first imposed on August 8, 2025, for an August 12, 2025 contest between Ryusei Kawaura (13-2) and Joe Shiraishi (12-1-1) for Kawaura's WBO Asia-Pacific Championship at 115 pounds (super flyweight) at Korakuen Hall.

== Distance change criticisms ==
The shift from a 15-round to a 12-round distance for title fights has been controversial. There have been studies which show that the brain becomes more susceptible to damage after the 12th round. Moreover, it has been argued that the 15-round distance greatly increased the risk of dehydration and exhaustion.

However, "purists" of the sport have contended that the shift from 15 rounds to 12 rounds has impacted viewership of the sport. Moreover, Frank Lotierzo, a critic of the 12-round limit, pointed out that fatalities are rare in heavyweight matches, instead attributing deaths to dehydration from the pressure of "making weight" for lower weight classes:

In my opinion, the reason that you hardly ever see fatalities in the heavyweight division is because the big guys don't have to make weight. In many cases, fighters under 150 pounds dehydrate themselves shedding those last few pounds to make weight. This leaves them vulnerable to brain injuries with a lack of fluid around their skull protecting the brain from crashing against it when they are hit. I believe this is more of a danger than fighters fighting 15 rounds. If I'm wrong, someone please explain why we rarely see heavyweights being killed in the ring? You would think most boxing fatalities would occur in the heavyweight division since they are clearly the most powerful punchers.

Lotierzo also argues that part of the motivation for a 12-round limit was not so much for safety, but to allow the matches to appear on network television. Previously, the timing of boxing involved 15 three-minute rounds with 14 one-minute intervals between each round, the preamble, and post-fight interviews—requiring around 70–75 minutes; in contrast, a 12-round bout lasts 47 minutes, which fits neatly into a one-hour time slot when pre- and post-fight programming and commercials are added in. However, by the 1990s, championship boxing had been almost exclusively become a premium pay-television (HBO, Showtime, pay-per-view) sport, meaning no commercials were necessary, and making that irrelevant.

Nonetheless, it has been noted that these rule changes have made certain kinds of boxing deaths far rarer, though boxing remains the 8th most deadly sport with 1.3 deaths per 100,000 participants.

=== Speculation regarding change ===
It has been argued that "some of the greatest moments in sports would never have occurred" were the 12-round limit imposed in earlier matches. Nonetheless, entirely different strategies might have been used were the fights scheduled for only 12 rather than 15 rounds, so it is possible that some or all matches could have ended the same way regardless of whether the scheduled distance were 12 or 15 rounds.

The following are some of the most notable longer championship distances, including the Fight of the Century, that would have had the reverse result were they abruptly ended after the 12th round:

- June 18, 1941: Joe Louis vs. Billy Conn — In this heavyweight championship match, Conn, the light-heavyweight titleholder, challenged Louis, the defending champion. Leading on all three scorecards, Conn would have captured the title were the bout only 12 rounds long, which might have prevented Louis from retaining the title by knocking out Conn with a six-punch barrage in the 13th round.
- June 17, 1954: Rocky Marciano vs. Ezzard Charles — For much of the match, it appeared that Charles would become the first former champion to regain the heavyweight crown. However, in each of the final rounds Marciano unleashed three-minute non-stop striking combinations, earning a close but unanimous victory over Charles. Had this been 12 rounds, Marciano would not have become, to this day, the only heavyweight champion to have finished his career undefeated. Charles also became the only man ever to last the full 15-round distance against Marciano.
- July 13, 1966: Emile Griffith vs. Joey Archer — Had this middleweight championship not gone the 15-round distance, the title would have been captured by Archer, but the defender outlasted and wore down Archer to retain it in the end.
- March 8, 1971: Fight of the Century (Joe Frazier vs. Muhammad Ali) — It has been argued that the apparent outcome of the match was reversed after "one of histories [sic] greatest left-hooks ever", which was thrown in the 15th round.
- September 16, 1981: Sugar Ray Leonard vs. Thomas Hearns — In what has been called "the biggest and most anticipated fight in welterweight history", Leonard was behind Hearns after the 12th round, though rallying to win in the 14th.
- November 12, 1982: Aaron Pryor vs. Alexis Argüello - In what was ultimately named "The Fight of the 1980s", former three weight champion Alexis Argüello moved up to challenge for undefeated Aaron Pryor's Light Welterweight championship. In what would prove to be a brilliant ebb and flow fight, the slicker, smaller puncher, Arguello, was ahead after 12 rounds. However, in between the 13th and 14th rounds, Pryor's head trainer Panama Lewis was heard to ask for "another bottle...the one I mixed". Any drink but water has been strictly regulated since the Marquess of Queensbury rules were introduced, and only in the 21st century have regulations permitted sports beverages with electrolytes, with mandatory sealing by officials before they may be consumed in contests. Rumors abound that the new bottle contained anything from Schnapps, to Alka Seltzer, PCP or an anti-asthma drug that opens the sinus cavities. Whatever the case, a suddenly revived Pryor stormed out of the corner and landed punch after punch on Arguello ultimately ending the Nicaraguan's bid to become a four weight champion. Had the fight only gone 12 rounds, it is argued that Arguello would probably be considered among the top three or four fighters of all-time. This contest occurred the day before the fatal fight which led to the reduction in championship fights to 12 rounds.

It has also been argued that extra rounds would have changed other fights after the distance was changed. As before, the trainers worked with the 12-round rule, and based their strategies on the 36-minute distance, compared to the 45-minute distance.

- April 6, 1987: Marvin Hagler vs. Sugar Ray Leonard — Before the match, it was believed that Leonard's decision to challenge Hagler, the World Middleweight Champion, was a dangerous mistake that seemed destined to result in "a brutal knockout loss". However, Leonard prevented Hagler from scoring by repeatedly dodging Hagler's heavy hits for the surprising upset victory by points. It was noted that Leonard was clearly more exhausted by the tactic than Hagler towards the final rounds and might not have been able to maintain his point lead for 15 rounds.
- July 16, 2005: Bernard Hopkins vs. Jermain Taylor I — The debate following the fight raised the question of whether Taylor, who was "losing steam" in the later rounds, would have won the title match had it been a 15-round bout. The 12-round distance was established for over 20 years at the time, and the trainers worked based on that rule, not 15 rounds.

== Popular culture ==
The notion of "going the distance" is featured prominently in the 1976 film Rocky in which Rocky Balboa and Apollo Creed fight 15 rounds for the World Heavyweight Championship. Rocky says,

Nobody's ever gone the distance with Creed, and if I can go that distance, you see, and that bell rings and I'm still standin', I'm gonna know for the first time in my life, see, that I weren't just another bum from the neighborhood.

Balboa (Sylvester Stallone) and Creed (Carl Weathers) nearly go the distance again in their rematch in 1979's Rocky II, as do Rocky and Ivan Drago in their showdown in Rocky IV. Balboa's final fight against Mason "The Line" Dixon in Rocky Balboa lasts the maximum of 10 rounds.

Balboa's use of the term has also inspired its use in other works, such as the song "Go the Distance" for the Disney animated feature Hercules by Alan Menken, who also wrote the song "The Measure of a Man" for Rocky V.
