= Mike Tyson vs. Tony Tucker =

Boxing competition

The Ultimate
- Date: August 1, 1987
- Venue: Las Vegas Hilton, Paradise, Nevada, U.S.
- Title(s) on the line: WBA, WBC, and IBF heavyweight titles

Tale of the tape
Boxer	Mike Tyson	Tony Tucker
Nickname	Iron	TNT
Hometown	Catskill, New York, U.S.	Houston, Texas, U.S.
Purse	$2,500,000	$1,900,000
Pre-fight record	30–0 (27 KO)	34–0 (1) (29 KO)
Age	21 years, 1 month	28 years, 7 months
Height	5 ft 10 in (178 cm)	6 ft 5 in (196 cm)
Weight	221 lb (100 kg)	221 lb (100 kg)
Style	Orthodox	Orthodox
Recognition	WBA and WBC; Heavyweight Champion; The Ring; No. 1 Ranked Heavyweight	IBF; Heavyweight Champion; The Ring; No. 7 Ranked Heavyweight

Result
- Tyson wins via 12-round unanimous decision (119–111, 118–113, 116–112)

Mike Tyson vs. Tony Tucker, billed as The Ultimate, was a professional boxing match contested on August 1, 1987 for the WBA, WBC, and IBF heavyweight championships.

== Background ==
This was the final match in the Heavyweight World Series, a tournament produced in conjunction with HBO and Don King Productions that sought to create an undisputed champion in the heavyweight division. The tournament began in 1986, and at the time the reigning champions were Pinklon Thomas, who was the WBC champion; Tony Tubbs, who was the WBA champion; and Michael Spinks, who was the IBF champion. By the end of the year, Tyson had claimed two of the three titles. He knocked out Trevor Berbick, who had defeated Thomas, for the WBC title and followed that up by claiming the WBA title, which had passed from Tubbs to Tim Witherspoon and then to James “Bonecrusher” Smith before Tyson won it.

Tucker, meanwhile, had a more circuitous rout to stake his claim to the championship. He was next in line for Spinks as the mandatory challenger for the IBF championship. Spinks, however, decided to begin negotiations for a fight with Gerry Cooney instead. Once that fight was signed, the IBF responded by stripping Spinks of his championship (although he still was regarded as lineal champion). A match was then set up between Tucker and Buster Douglas to serve as a co-feature of a May 30, 1987 event. The winner of the Tucker-Douglas fight would claim the vacant IBF championship and face the winner of the second co-feature, pitting Tyson against former champion Thomas, for all three major titles in his next fight. Tucker outlasted Douglas and scored a tenth-round technical knockout to win his fight, and Tyson knocked Thomas out in the sixth round to secure the unification match. The two men would have a relatively short amount of time between their fights, only 9 weeks (a couple of months in fact).

== The fight ==
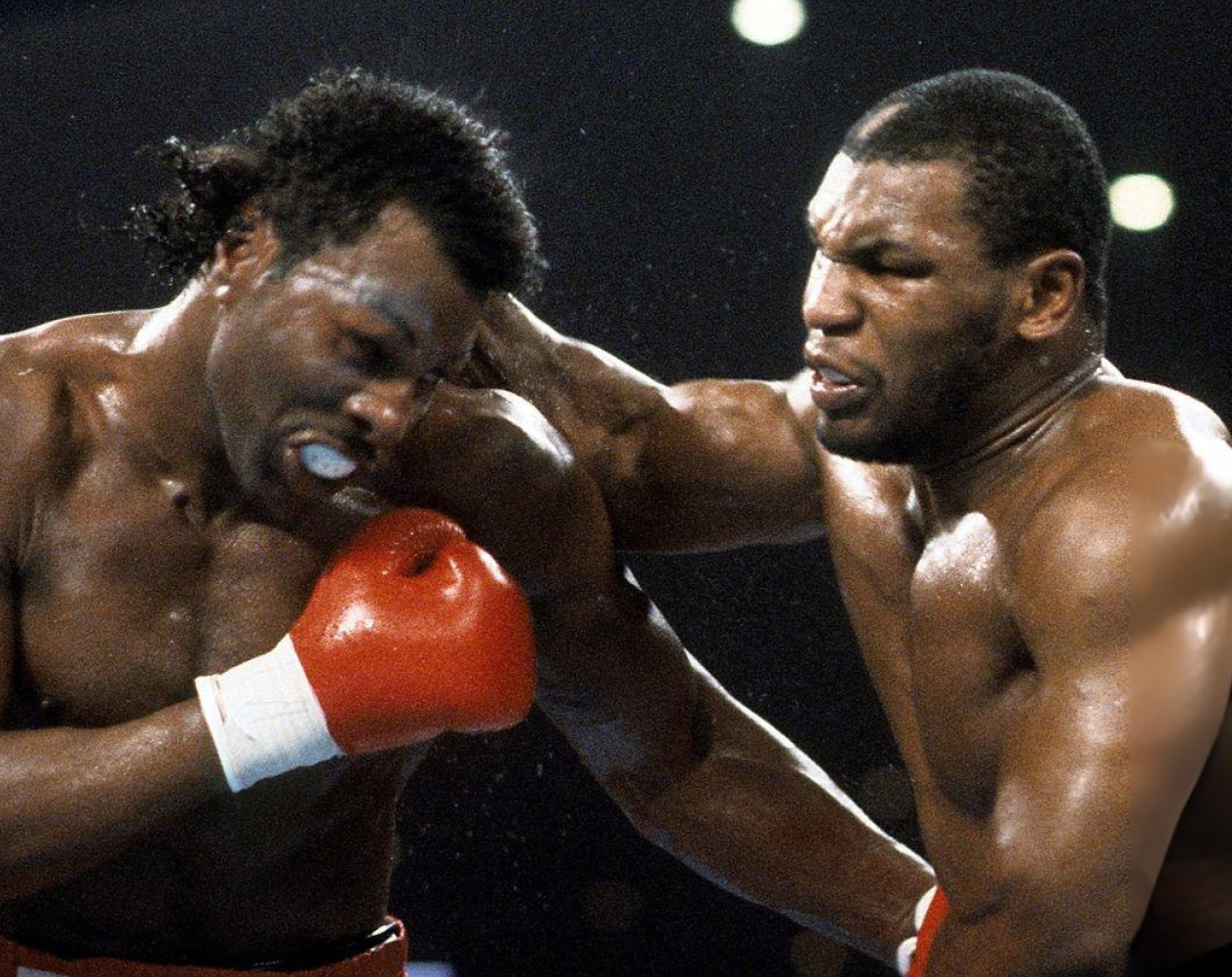

Tyson had been met with little resistance from Berbick, Smith and Thomas; however, Tucker would arguably become one of the toughest opponents in Tyson's early career. Tucker came out strong in round 1, hitting Tyson on the side of the head with a short left hook. Tucker continued to fight Tyson aggressively in the early rounds and won rounds 1 and 3 on the scorecards. As the fight went on, Tyson began to find his rhythm and dominated during the middle rounds, landing several power punches in rounds 4 through 7, leading to Tucker throwing fewer punches and either grappling or avoiding Tyson entirely in an effort to reduce his punching effectiveness. During the final two rounds, Tucker began taunting Tyson by winding up his right glove, shuffling his feet and finally dropping his hands and beckoning Tyson to hit him on the chin. In the end, though, Tyson was named the winner via unanimous decision, leading on all three judges' scorecards by 119–111, 118–113, and 116–112. With his victory Tyson became the first Undisputed Heavyweight Champion since Leon Spinks in 1978, albeit one not recognized as the Lineal champion or by Ring magazine.

== Aftermath ==
After Tyson's victory, speculation began over whether or not Tyson would next face undefeated lineal heavyweight champion Michael Spinks, who had attended the Tyson–Tucker fight to entertain the thought of facing Tyson should he defeat Tucker. Tyson would knock out his next three opponents (Tyrell Biggs, Larry Holmes, and Tony Tubbs) before reaching an agreement in April 1988 to face Spinks. Tyson would defeat Spinks in 91 seconds to add the lineal championship to his resume.

Tucker would follow up the first loss of his professional career by racking up 14 consecutive victories, landing him another shot at the WBC Heavyweight championship against Lennox Lewis, though he would ultimately lose via unanimous decision.

Tucker later stated that he broke his right hand early in the fight, after damaging it in pre-fight sparring. Tucker stated: "I hit him with a right uppercut early and my hand just shattered. It was the worst pain ever. I still went on though, that's why I did all those antics and everything."

== Undercard ==
Confirmed bouts:

== Broadcasting ==
Country	Broadcaster
United Kingdom	ITV
United States	HBO

Preceded by vs. Pinklon Thomas	Mike Tyson's bouts August 1, 1987	Succeeded by vs. Tyrell Biggs
Preceded by vs. Buster Douglas	Tony Tucker's bouts August 1, 1987	Succeeded by vs. Dino Homsey
