= Heavyweight unification series =

Series of professional boxing matches held in 1986 and 1987

The heavyweight unification series, also known as the Heavyweight World Series, was a sequence of professional boxing matches held in 1986 and 1987 to crown an undisputed champion of the heavyweight class. The series was produced by HBO Sports and promoted by Don King. It ended with Mike Tyson as undisputed champion, holding the championship belts of the International Boxing Federation (IBF), World Boxing Association (WBA), and World Boxing Council (WBC).

== Background ==
Prior to the series, the last undisputed heavyweight champion had been Leon Spinks, who won the championship in his 1978 victory over Muhammad Ali. Spinks was stripped of his WBC title later that year because he opted to fight a rematch against Ali instead of a mandatory challenger; the heavyweight championship had been fragmented ever since. This fragmentation and the resulting proliferation of title fights was seen by many as a discredit to the sport, and resulted in declining public interest in boxing.

The idea of the series originated in October 1985, when Don King visited HBO Sports president Seth Abraham to propose a WBC title fight between Pinklon Thomas and Trevor Berbick. Abraham had little interest in the fight, but, inspired by the World Series that was being televised at the time, he suggested making the fight the first in a series to unify the heavyweight titles. King and Abraham mapped out the seven fights that would constitute the series, which King estimated could be produced for $20 million.

King and HBO announced the series on January 17, 1986, during a press conference before a fight between Tim Witherspoon and Tony Tubbs. That fight was seen as an unofficial prelude to the series, as the winner would hold the WBA title and would participate in the series. The series would also include WBC champion Pinklon Thomas, IBF champion Michael Spinks, and top contenders from each of the three sanctioning bodies' rankings. The organizers were hopeful that Mike Tyson, then a young, fresh face, would qualify for the tournament and generate excitement for what was otherwise seen by some analysts as an unappealing slate of fighters.

== Fights ==
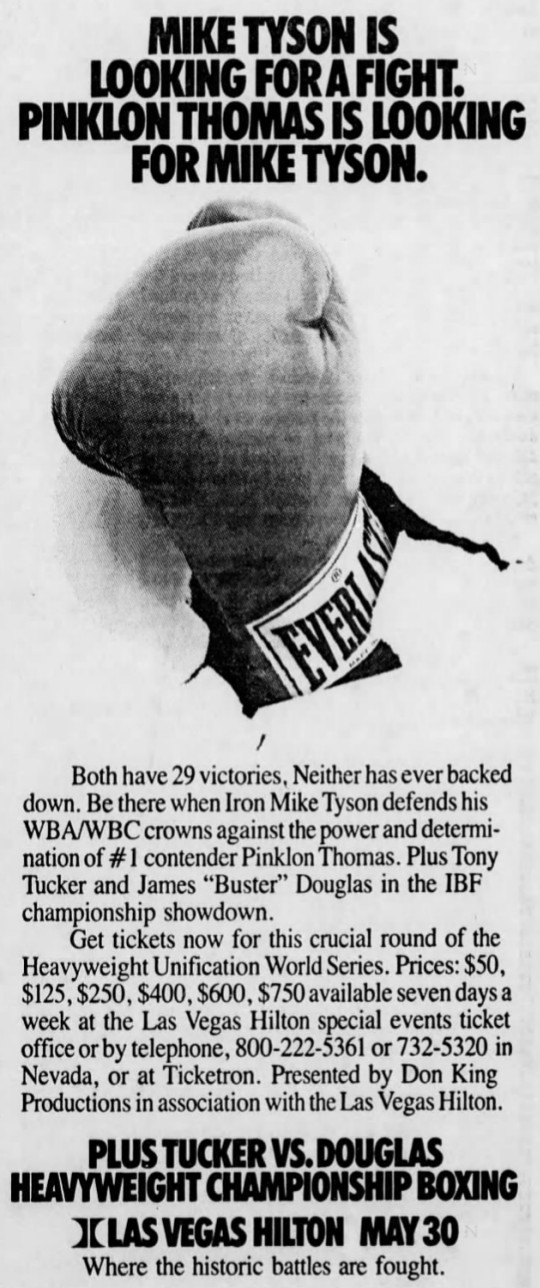
Newspaper advertisement for the penultimate fight in the series, Mike Tyson vs. Pinklon Thomas

- Tony Tubbs vs. Tim Witherspoon (unofficial precursor) – January 17, 1986 at the Omni Coliseum – Witherspoon defeated Tubbs by majority decision to win WBA title.
- Pinklon Thomas vs. Trevor Berbick – March 22, 1986 at the Riviera – Berbick defeated Thomas by unanimous decision to win the WBC title.
- Michael Spinks vs. Larry Holmes II – April 19, 1986 at the Las Vegas Hilton – Spinks defeated Holmes by split decision to retain the IBF title.
- Tim Witherspoon vs. Frank Bruno – July 19, 1986 at Wembley Stadium – Witherspoon defeated Bruno by technical knockout in eleven rounds to retain the WBA title.
- Michael Spinks vs. Steffen Tangstad – September 6, 1986 at the Las Vegas Hilton – Spinks knocked out Tangstad in four rounds to retain the IBF title.
- Trevor Berbick vs. Mike Tyson – November 22, 1986 at the Las Vegas Hilton – Tyson knocked out Berbick in two rounds to win the WBC title.
- Tim Witherspoon vs. James "Bonecrusher" Smith – December 12, 1986 at Madison Square Garden – Smith defeated Witherspoon by technical knockout in the first round to win the WBA title.
- Mike Tyson vs. James "Bonecrusher" Smith – March 7, 1987 at the Las Vegas Hilton – Tyson defeated Smith by unanimous decision to add the WBA title to his WBC title.
- "Hard Road to Glory" – May 30, 1987 at the Las Vegas Hilton
  - Tony Tucker vs. James "Buster" Douglas – Tucker defeated Douglas by technical knockout in ten rounds to claim the vacant IBF title (which had been stripped from Spinks)
  - Mike Tyson vs. Pinklon Thomas – Tyson defeated Thomas by technical knockout in six rounds to retain the WBA and WBC titles.
- Mike Tyson vs. Tony Tucker – August 1, 1987 at the Las Vegas Hilton – Tyson defeated Tucker by unanimous decision to become the undisputed champion.

== Aftermath ==
Michael Spinks had been stripped of his IBF title in the middle of the tournament because he had accepted a lucrative offer to fight Gerry Cooney, instead of facing his mandatory challenger, Tony Tucker. Spinks, however, was still recognized as the lineal champion (which he had not lost in the ring) as well as The Ring magazine heavyweight champion. Following the unification series, there were ongoing calls for Tyson, the champion of all three major sanctioning bodies, and Spinks, the lineal champion, to fight and erase any doubt about the identity of the "true" champion. In June 1988, the two champions faced off, and Tyson knocked out Spinks in 91 seconds. Although Tyson did officially unify the heavyweight title by winning the WBC/WBA/IBF belts in the HBO Unification Tournament, he did not achieve true universal recognition as the undisputed world heavyweight champion until he won this bout with Spinks.

Tyson held on to his titles until February 1990, when he was knocked out by Buster Douglas. The titles remained unified until December 1992, when undisputed champion Riddick Bowe relinquished his WBC title.

== See also ==
- Middleweight World Championship Series – A similar series organized by Don King in 2001
