= Mike Tyson vs. Buster Douglas =

Boxing match

Tyson is Back!
- Promotional poster
- Date: February 11, 1990
- Venue: Tokyo Dome, Tokyo, Japan
- Title(s) on the line: WBA, WBC and IBF undisputed heavyweight championship

Tale of the tape
Boxer	Mike Tyson	James Douglas
Nickname	Iron	Buster
Hometown	Catskill, New York, US	Columbus, Ohio, US
Purse	$6,000,000	$1,300,000
Pre-fight record	37–0 (33 KO)	29–4–1 (1) (19 KO)
Age	23 years, 7 months	29 years, 10 months
Height	5 ft 10 in (178 cm)	6 ft 4 in (193 cm)
Weight	220 1/2 lb (100 kg)	231 1/2 lb (105 kg)
Style	Orthodox	Orthodox
Recognition	WBA, WBC and IBF undisputed Heavyweight Champion; The Ring; No. 1 Ranked Heavyweight; The Ring No. 1 ranked pound-for-pound fighter	IBF; No. 2 Ranked Heavyweight; WBC; No. 3 Ranked Heavyweight; WBA; No. 4 Ranked Heavyweight; The Ring; No. 7 Ranked Heavyweight

Result
- Douglas wins via 10th-round knockout

Mike Tyson vs. Buster Douglas, billed as Tyson is Back!, was a professional boxing match that occurred at the Tokyo Dome on Sunday, February 11, 1990. The then-undefeated, undisputed heavyweight champion Tyson lost by knockout to the 42-1 underdog Douglas. The fight is widely regarded as the biggest upset in boxing history and one of the biggest in sports history.

== Background ==
Going into the fight, Mike Tyson was the undefeated and undisputed heavyweight champion of the world and was very popular at the time. He held the WBC, WBA, and IBF titles. Despite several controversies that marred Tyson's profile at the time, such as his allegedly abusive relationship with Robin Givens, contractual battles between longtime manager Bill Cayton and promoter Don King, and Tyson's departure from longtime trainer Kevin Rooney, Tyson was still dominant in the ring. He scored a 93-second knockout against Carl "The Truth" Williams in his previous fight. Most considered this fight to be a warm-up bout for Tyson before meeting up with then-undefeated number-one heavyweight contender Evander Holyfield (who was ringside for the fight). Tyson was viewed as such a dominant champion that he was often considered the number-one fighter in the world pound-for-pound (including by Ring Magazine), a rarity for heavyweights.

Buster Douglas was ranked as the #7 heavyweight contender by Ring Magazine and had met with mixed success in his professional career up to that point. His previous title fight was against Tony Tucker in 1987, in which he was TKO'd in the 10th round. However, six consecutive wins since the Tucker fight—including victories over former world champion Trevor Berbick and future world champion Oliver McCall—gave him the opportunity to fight Tyson. In the time leading up to the fight, Douglas faced a number of personal setbacks, including the death of his mother, Lula Pearl, 23 days before the fight. Additionally, the mother of his son had a severe kidney ailment, and he had contracted the flu on the day before the fight.

HBO boxing analysts Larry Merchant and Jim Lampley expected to see "another 90-second annihilation." (When asked by a Japanese customs official how long he expected to be working in Japan, Ed Schuyler of the Associated Press replied, "Oh, about ninety seconds.") Instead of discussing Douglas's chances against Tyson, Merchant and Lampley compared their pets: Tyson had a white pitbull named "Duran" (after his idol Roberto Durán) while Douglas had a beagle named "Shakespeare." Merchant, after saying that "this fight is over before it begins or soon thereafter" and describing Douglas as "just another frozen tuna" from the Tokyo fish market, opined that "any prizefighter with a dog named Shakespeare can't be all-bad." In an interview given to HBO prior to the fight, Douglas told reporters that his favorite Shakespeare play was the romantic tragedy Romeo and Juliet. Lampley suggested that if Tyson were asked the same question (assuming he had read Shakespeare), he would choose something more bloody and violent, such as Henry the Fifth or Macbeth.

Singer Bobby Brown wrote in his autobiography that he met with Tyson in Tokyo and the two partied extensively the night before the fight. Brown claims Tyson refused to go to sleep early for the fight, deeming Douglas "an amateur" he could beat "if I didn't sleep for five weeks".

== The fight ==
From the beginning of the fight, it was apparent that Douglas was not afraid. Douglas displayed a lot of spring in his body movement and was not cautious in letting his punches fly whenever he saw the opportunity to attack Tyson. He used his quick and accurate jab to prevent Tyson from getting inside, where Tyson was most dangerous. When Tyson tried to get inside, Douglas tied him up, moved away, or would immediately hit Tyson with multiple punches as Tyson came within Douglas' range. Early on, Douglas was more agile than Tyson and outlanded Tyson in exchanges. Douglas finished the second round with a snappy uppercut to Tyson's chin.

Seeming to regain his form, Tyson landed a punishing left to the body that had Douglas look at his corner. After an ineffectual and lackluster third round, Tyson cornerman Jay Bright screamed at his fighter "Don't just stand there and look at him, you've gotta work!" Boxer "Sugar" Ray Leonard, at ringside doing commentary for HBO, noted Douglas' dominance with the jab and right hand and said Tyson was having one of those occasional days in the ring where "you just don't have it...things just don't click in".

Douglas would still dominate the middle rounds, although Tyson managed to land a few of his signature uppercuts. Tyson was wobbled by a chopping right during the fifth round. Soon, Tyson's left eye began to swell from Douglas' right jabs, preventing him from seeing his opponent's punches well. Tyson's cornermen were caught unprepared; they were so confident Tyson would easily beat Douglas that they had not brought an endswell or ice packs, usually standard equipment for a fight. Instead, they filled a latex glove with ice water and held it on Tyson's eye between rounds. Aaron Snowell, Tyson's primary cornerman, at one point caught the chain from the identification badge hanging from his neck between the iced glove and Tyson's eye. Tyson winced in pain as Snowell moved dragging the chain from one side of his injured eye to the other. Confusion and panic grew in his corner as the fight went on. Despite Tyson's inability to execute an effective fight plan, his corner continued to give him the same advice between rounds to move his head, jab his way inside and deliver a right hand. In the eighth round -- a round Douglas dominated until the last few seconds -- HBO's Larry Merchant noted, "Douglas is asking of Tyson some questions he hasn't been asked before...in the last few rounds of a fight, you have to come back and win it."

Within the last ten seconds of the eighth round, Tyson, who had been backed onto the ropes, landed a big right uppercut that sent Douglas to the canvas. Although the knockdown timekeeper began when Douglas's backside touched the ring's surface, the referee was said to have started his own count behind by two beats. In obvious annoyance at his own lapse, Douglas pounded his left fist on the mat. Douglas rose as the referee signaled nine, but the bell ended the round. Tyson promoter Don King would later argue the validity of the referee count in vain.

In the ninth round, Tyson came out aggressively to try to end the fight and save his title, hoping that Douglas was still hurt from the knockdown. Douglas was able to fight off Tyson's attack and was able to close Tyson's eye completely. Both men traded punches before Douglas connected on a four-punch combination that staggered Tyson back to the ropes. With Tyson hurt along the ropes, Douglas closed in and unleashed a four-punch attack to try to knock Tyson out. Tyson withstood the punishment and barely survived the round.

In the tenth round, Tyson pushed forward, but he was still hurting from the accumulation of punishment he had absorbed throughout the match. As Tyson advanced, Douglas measured him with a few jabs before landing an uppercut that snapped Tyson's head upward, stopping Tyson in his tracks. As Tyson reeled back, Douglas immediately followed with four punches to the head, knocking Tyson down for the first time in his career. In a famous scene, Tyson fumbled for his mouthpiece on the canvas before sticking one end in his mouth with the other end hanging out. The champion attempted to make it back to his feet, but referee Octavio Meyran counted him out. Buster Douglas thus became the new undisputed heavyweight champion, engineering one of the biggest upsets in boxing history. The official scorecards through nine rounds were 87–86 for Tyson, 86–86, and 88–83 for Douglas.

During the post-fight interview, Douglas broke down in tears when asked why he was able to win this fight when no one thought he could. "Because of my mother...God bless her heart," said the emotional new champion.

Merchant concluded that it was the expulsion of Kevin Rooney, who still rooted for Tyson every time he watched him fight (despite their split), which led to the stunning knockout loss. Merchant said Tyson needed Rooney in much the same way that Muhammad Ali needed Angelo Dundee. Merchant speculated that with Rooney in his corner, Tyson would have managed to end the fight on his feet, and to change the tide of the fight, exactly as in the Tucker fight, after he was rocked in the first round but weathered the storm with Rooney's help and came back determined to win, outboxing his opponent. Butch Lewis shared the same opinion, believing that after he got rid of Rooney, Tyson found himself in a situation where there was no one to enforce compliance with the training regimen and a normal daily routine, and tell him "Back on track, Mike!" when needed. So did Jerry Izenberg, who commented: "They assemble a corner for that fight which looks like it was picked up out of the semi-finals of the Intercity Golden Gloves."

== Aftermath and legacy ==
As a 42-1 underdog, Douglas earned $1.3 million from the fight while Tyson got $6 million.

Tyson's camp, led by Don King, immediately protested the result, claiming that Douglas had been given a long count by referee Octavio Meyran. The WBA and WBC initially agreed and suspended recognition of Douglas as champion, although the IBF immediately accepted that the result was valid. After a public outcry and demands from boxing commissions around the world that they acknowledge Douglas as the champion, the protest was withdrawn and Douglas' win was recognized four days after the fight. In spite of Douglas' inspired and dominant performance, a sizable number of boxing fans viewed the fight outcome as an aberration, leading to interest in a rematch.

In an HBO studio interview with Merchant the following week, Douglas stated the protest and post-fight confusion ruined what should have been the best time of his life.

At the time of the fight, Don King was said to have been negotiating for Tyson's next fight to be in the fall in Berlin against former champion Greg Page, who had decked Tyson while sparring with him three weeks before the Douglas fight. A future Mike Tyson versus George Foreman fight to be promoted by the Sultan of Brunei was also shelved.

Plans for a rematch fell through, so Douglas' first title defence was against No. 1 contender Evander Holyfield. An overweight Douglas, weighing 14.5 pounds (6.6 kg) more than in the Tyson fight, was knocked out by Holyfield in the third round. Douglas retired after the fight. Six years later, he launched a comeback after almost dying in a diabetic coma and won a few fights against journeyman opposition. He fought for the last time in 1999. Despite rumours of a rematch with Tyson throughout the 1990s, they never faced each other again.

Tyson would fight four more times after the Douglas fight before being convicted of raping beauty pageant contestant Desiree Washington in 1991. Following his release from the Indiana Youth Center in 1995 he quickly regained the WBA and WBC world titles, before losing them to Holyfield and was never again a world champion. He fought on sporadically for another decade and lost in another title challenge against Lennox Lewis in 2002. He retired from boxing in 2005 after consecutive losses to journeymen.

Buster Douglas went down in sports lore as a prize fighter who defied the odds to pull off one of the biggest upsets in sports history. Among the honors was a cover photo on an issue of Sports Illustrated with the title "Rocky Lives!," after the popular film series about a similarly underestimated boxing hero. For Tyson, though he retained a menacing aura for years afterwards, "the mystique of the untouchable, invincible 'Baddest Man on the Planet' had been shattered." Tyson himself knew as much, stating after he ended his career by losing to unheralded Kevin McBride in 2005, "My career has been over since 1990." The fight is often ranked among the biggest upsets in sports history.

== In popular culture ==
The fight appeared in the Mike Tyson Mysteries episode "Help a Brother Out".

Douglas's upset against Tyson is the inspiration for the song "Tyson vs Douglas" by the Killers from their fifth studio album, Wonderful Wonderful (2017). Frontman Brandon Flowers used the childhood memory of watching the seemingly invincible Tyson lose as the motivation for a song that's about "me and my family, and the way I’m perceived by my kids. I don’t want them to see me go down like Tyson." The song also features audio of the commentators for the fight.

The fight is referenced in a short film by Paradigm Studios when a boxer, who came out of retirement, made a promise to his dying son; the short film also references how Douglas made a promise to his dying mother that he would win.

In 1990, In Living Color made references to the fight in the "Three Champs and a Baby/Little Lady" sketches. In the first, Tyson prank calls Buster demanding a rematch, while in "Little Lady" Tyson uses an action figure to mock Douglas's loss to Holyfield.

== Undercard ==
Confirmed bouts:

== Broadcasting ==
Country	Broadcaster	Studio host	Studio analyst/s	Play by play Announcer	Color commentator/s
Brazil	Rede Bandeirantes	Elia Junior		Alexandre Santos	Newton Campos
Japan	Nippon TV	None	Kazuo Tokumitsu, Shigeo Nagashima and Junji Yamagiwa	Toshimi Ashizawa, Masashi Funakoshi and Yoshihiko Murayama (guest)	Fighting Harada, Tsuyoshi Hamada, Shigeo Nagashima and Evander Holyfield (guest)
Philippines	IBC 13	None	None	Freddie Abando and Ron delos Reyes	None
United Kingdom	Sky	Paul Dempsey	Frank Bruno, Lennox Lewis and Glenn McCrory	Ian Darke	Colin Hart and Evander Holyfield (guest)
United States	HBO	None	None	Jim Lampley	Larry Merchant, Sugar Ray Leonard and Evander Holyfield (Guest)
Thailand	Channel 3	Pitsanu Nilklad	None	None	None

Preceded by vs. Carl Williams	Mike Tyson's bouts February 11, 1990	Succeeded by vs. Henry Tillman
Preceded by vs. Oliver McCall	Buster Douglas' bouts February 11, 1990	Succeeded by vs. Evander Holfield
Awards
Preceded by René Jacquot; W12 Donald Curry	The Ring Magazine Upset of the Year; 1990	Succeeded by Azumah Nelson; KO8 Jeff Fenech*
Previous: Mike Tyson vs. Frank Bruno; Round 1	KO Magazine Round of the Year; Round 8; 1991	Next: Chris Eubank vs. Michael Watson II; Round 11
