= Tim Witherspoon vs. James Smith II =

Boxing match

The Pride is Back: Return to Glory
- Date: December 12, 1986
- Venue: Madison Square Garden, New York City, New York, U.S.
- Title(s) on the line: WBA heavyweight title

Tale of the tape
Boxer	Tim Witherspoon	James Smith
Nickname	Terrible	Bonecrusher
Hometown	Philadelphia, Pennsylvania, U.S.	Magnolia, North Carolina, U.S.
Purse	$300,000	$230,000
Pre-fight record	25–2 (17 KO)	18–5 (13 KO)
Age	28 years, 11 months	33 years, 8 months
Height	6 ft 3 1/2 in (192 cm)	6 ft 4 in (193 cm)
Weight	233 1/2 lb (106 kg)	228 1/2 lb (104 kg)
Style	Orthodox	Orthodox
Recognition	WBA; Heavyweight Champion; The Ring; No. 2 Ranked Heavyweight	WBA; No. 9 Ranked Heavyweight; The Ring; No. 6 Ranked Heavyweight

Result
- Smith wins via first-round knockout

Tim Witherspoon vs. James Smith II, billed as The Pride is Back: Return to Glory, was a professional boxing match contested on December 12, 1986, for the WBA heavyweight title. It was Witherspoon's second defence of the championship he had won from Tony Tubbs in January 1986.

== Background ==
The fight was carried live on HBO World Championship Boxing, HBO's then-flagship series of boxing telecasts. Barry Tompkins was the lead commentator with Larry Merchant and Sugar Ray Leonard as analysts.

Don King Productions also produced its own broadcast of the fight, as it often did on cards that were promoted by King. The voice of King Productions, Bob Sheridan, called the fight.

The official assigned to the bout was Luis Rivera, with judges Samuel Conde Lopez, Julio Roldan, and Joe Santarpia scoring. The bout was scheduled for fifteen rounds, as the WBA had yet to adopt the now-standard twelve round distance for title fights that had begun to be implemented following the death of fighter Duk Koo Kim in 1982. The WBA rules also feature a requirement that a contest stops after three knockdowns in a round (a New York State rule since 1937; the WBA's roots are from the New York State Athletic Commission).

=== Heavyweight World Series ===
The fight was the sixth fight in the Heavyweight World Series, which was promoted by Don King and sought to crown an undisputed world champion. The heavyweight class had not seen an undisputed champion since 1978, after the World Boxing Council stripped Leon Spinks of their title; instead of facing Ken Norton in a mandatory defence of the title, Spinks opted instead to pursue a rematch with Muhammad Ali (which he eventually would lose). Since then, a third sanctioning body had been formed – the International Boxing Federation – and had gained worldwide recognition; the eventual winner of the multi-fight series would not only be the undisputed world champion but also be the first to hold three major world championships at the same time.

=== Witherspoon vs. Smith I ===
The first fight between Witherspoon and Smith took place on June 15, 1985, in Winchester, Nevada, and was sanctioned by the WBA as a title eliminator. The winner of the bout would receive a title match against Tony Tubbs, who dethroned WBA champion Greg Page in April 1985.

Entering the fight, Witherspoon had not lost since Pinklon Thomas defeated him for his World Boxing Council (WBC) championship in 1984 and was the reigning North American Boxing Federation regional heavyweight champion. Smith had lost two of his previous three fights, being knocked out by Larry Holmes in a fight for the International Boxing Federation (IBF) championship and losing to Tubbs earlier in 1985. Their fight was a one-sided affair, with Witherspoon winning every round except for one on all three judges' scorecards to take a twelve-round unanimous decision.

=== Witherspoon vs. Tubbs ===
Witherspoon faced off against Tubbs in January 1986 and scored a majority decision victory. In doing so, he joined Muhammad Ali and Floyd Patterson as a fighter who had won a piece of the heavyweight title after previously having dethroned; as mentioned above, Witherspoon was a former WBC champion, having defeated the aforementioned Greg Page to win the title in 1984 after Holmes opted to relinquish it rather than defending against Page.

However, there were controversial circumstances surrounding the victory as Witherspoon failed a post-fight urine test. The usual procedure when this happens is to vacate the result of the fight and mark it officially as a no contest. Don King and the WBA, however, had discussions over allowing Witherspoon to retain the title. The two sides would eventually strike an agreement where the result of the fight was allowed to stand, but a rematch between the two fighters would be ordered by the WBA. July 1986 was the target date.

However, Witherspoon and King began negotiating with Frank Bruno, the former European heavyweight champion and a rising contender, in his first defense of the title in London and convinced Tubbs to postpone the mandatory rematch. After he defeated Bruno by technical knockout in the eleventh round, the rematch with Tubbs was scheduled for December.

Smith, meanwhile, was defeated by Marvis Frazier in his first fight after Witherspoon defeated him. He managed to rebound significantly in his next fight and knocked out former world champion Mike Weaver in the first round. Smith then got a majority decision victory over Jesse Ferguson, a unanimous decision over David Bey, and had signed to face off against Mitch Green after that on the undercard of the Witherspoon-Tubbs rematch.

However, shortly before the fight, chaos began to ensue. First, Tubbs pulled out citing a shoulder injury. King immediately cried foul, claiming that Tubbs was not actually injured but instead trying to get King to agree to increase his purse for the fight. Needing a replacement, the first choice was Tyrell Biggs, the former Olympic super heavyweight champion who had yet to be defeated and was already scheduled to fight Renaldo Snipes on the undercard. The sides could not agree on a purse for Biggs so King instead contacted Smith's management and offered him the fight, which he accepted.

After that, a contentious news conference was scheduled to promote the fight two days before the telecast. Witherspoon threatened to pull out of the fight due to a dispute with King over his contractual terms. Green, who was left without an opponent once Smith took the title fight, also showed up at the news conference threatening to "break (King's) neck" for what he believed was six years of purse money the promoter stole from him. HBO, meanwhile, threatened to not air any of the fights scheduled for that night if the main event did not go as scheduled.

Eventually, cooler heads prevailed and Witherspoon showed up for the prefight weigh-in the morning before the bout.

== The fight ==
Smith's trainer, former multiple division champion Emile Griffith, told him as he got ready to begin the fight "let's go home early," imploring him to take the fight to Witherspoon. As the bell rang, Smith did exactly this and within the first minute of the fight, the champion was hurt. Witherspoon tried to clinch to stop the onslaught but a determined Smith was able to fight out of each attempt and backed Witherspoon against the ropes. A hard overhand right to the head dropped the champion to a knee, which forced him to take the mandatory eight count. Smith resumed his assault after Witherspoon got up, hitting him with enough force to knock one of Witherspoon's teeth out before knocking him down again.

Being the second knockdown of the WBA championship contest, Smith was one knockdown in the round from winning by automatic knockout. Witherspoon again rose to his feet and resumed fighting, needing to remain on his feet for the remainder of the round in order to continue. Smith resumed his assault, landing several heavy punches, and with forty-five seconds remaining in the round Witherspoon went down again, which constitutes an automatic knockout under WBA rules. Smith was winner by knockout and had pulled off a major upset.

After the fight, the defeated former champion admitted that the pressure of the situations leading into it had gotten to him, saying that he was unable to get himself focused for the fight.

== Aftermath ==
The winner of this fight was to face off against Mike Tyson, the reigning WBC champion, in the next fight in the unification series. That fight took place on March 7, 1987. Despite becoming the third fighter besides James Tillis and the aforementioned Mitch Green to take Tyson to a decision, Smith lost a unanimous decision by a wide margin and had several points deducted for holding during the course of the fight. Smith never fought for a world championship again in his career, and he fought until 1999 when he lost a rematch against Larry Holmes, who defeated Smith for the International Boxing Federation championship by knockout in the twelfth round of a fifteen-round fight in 1984.

Witherspoon also never received a shot at any world championship following his defeat at the hands of Smith. He would receive championship opportunities for regional championships, including when he beat Carl "The Truth" Williams for the United States Boxing Association championship in 1991. Witherspoon fought until 2003, losing his final fight to Brian Nix by split decision.

== Undercard ==
Confirmed bouts:

== Broadcasting ==
Country	Broadcaster
Philippines	PTV 4
United Kingdom	ITV
United States	HBO

Preceded by vs. Frank Bruno	Tim Witherspoon's bouts 12 December 1986	Succeeded by vs. Mark Wills
Preceded by vs. David Bey	James Smith's bouts 12 December 1986	Succeeded by vs. Mike Tyson
