= Mike Tyson vs. Tyrell Biggs =

Boxing competition

The Clash for the Crown
- Date: October 16, 1987
- Venue: Convention Hall, Atlantic City, New Jersey, U.S.
- Title(s) on the line: WBA, WBC, and IBF heavyweight titles

Tale of the tape
Boxer	Mike Tyson	Tyrell Biggs
Nickname	Iron	
Hometown	Catskill, New York, U.S.	Philadelphia, Pennsylvania, U.S.
Purse	$2,250,000	$1,250,000
Pre-fight record	31–0 (27 KO)	15–0 (10 KO)
Age	21 years, 3 months	26 years, 9 months
Height	5 ft 10 in (178 cm)	6 ft 5 in (196 cm)
Weight	216 lb (98 kg)	228 3/4 lb (104 kg)
Style	Orthodox	Orthodox
Recognition	WBA, WBC and IBF; Heavyweight Champion; The Ring; No. 1 Ranked Heavyweight	WBA/WBC/IBF; No. 1 Ranked Heavyweight; The Ring; No. 6 Ranked Heavyweight

Result
- Tyson wins via 7th-round TKO

Mike Tyson vs. Tyrell Biggs, billed as The Clash for the Crown, was a professional boxing match contested on October 16, 1987, for the undisputed heavyweight championship, which at the time consisted of the WBA, WBC and IBF heavyweight titles.

== Background ==
According to Mike Tyson's Book "Undisputed Truth", Tyrell Biggs dissed Tyson in 1984. When Tyson came to wish the American Boxing Olympic team good luck, a lady came and wished the boxers a good trip. Tyrell Biggs then proceeded to laugh and said "I don't know about him, but he certainly ain't getting on that plane" (referring to Mike Tyson not being selected among the American Boxing Olympic Team).

Only two months prior to his match with Biggs, Tyson had defeated Tony Tucker by unanimous decision to unify all three major heavyweight championships and become the Undisputed Heavyweight Champion. Though many had hoped this would lead to a match with Lineal Heavyweight champion Michael Spinks, Spinks remained reluctant to face Tyson. As such, Tyson instead chose to face one of his mandatory challengers, 1984 Olympic Gold Medalist Tyrell Biggs, who was undefeated since turning pro. Prior to their fight, Biggs bashed Tyson in the press, boldly stating among other things "He`s never fought anyone like me. I don't know this Tyson the way you guys talk about him. I know Tyson from way back when." Biggs would also promise to use his mobility and superior overall boxing ability against the stronger Tyson, stating, "He's strong, but his strength will not hurt me. Every fighter I fight is stronger than me, but as the fight goes on, as I use my mobility and boxing ability, strength is no longer a factor. What will he do then?"

== The fight ==
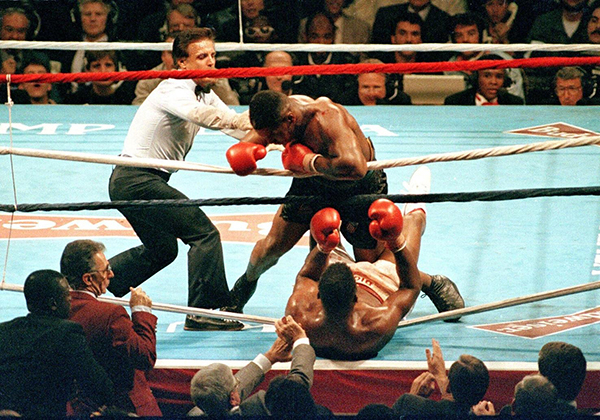
Tyson knocks down Biggs in the 7th-round

Through the first two rounds, Biggs attempted to ward off Tyson's attack by keeping his distance and throwing sharp left jabs at Tyson while also attempting to use his distinct height advantage to avoid Tyson's power punches. Biggs had a solid 1st round, connecting with over half of jabs while limiting Tyson to only three. Biggs would continue to use this tactic early in round 2, but Tyson was able to connect with a big left hook that split Biggs's lip open. By round 3, Biggs had all but abandoned his gameplan and was overwhelmed by Tyson's power, with Tyson eventually landing a strong right hand that opened a cut around Biggs's left eye. Tyson would continue to dominate in rounds 5 and 6, consistently attacking Biggs with hooks and right hands, though Biggs would survive both rounds without getting knocked down. With 30 seconds left in round 7, Tyson hit Biggs with a left hook that sent Biggs to canvas and almost out of the ring. Biggs was able to answer the referee's count at nine. Tyson would continue his assault as soon as Biggs got up and quickly knocked down Biggs again, this time with a left hook, leading to referee Tony Orlando stopping the fight and awarding Tyson the victory via technical knockout.

== Aftermath ==
Tyson would go on to easily defeat his next two opponents, knocking out aging former Heavyweight champion Larry Holmes in the 4th round and then knocking out Tony Tubbs in the 2nd round. This would finally set up the much anticipated Tyson–Spinks fight, a match Tyson would win in 91 seconds to capture the Lineal Heavyweight championship.

Meanwhile, Biggs would struggle both in and out of the boxing ring. He was knocked out by his next two opponents, but would rebound to win his next four fights and in 1991, he would meet two future Undisputed Heavyweight champions, Riddick Bowe and Lennox Lewis, though he was defeated by both men by way of technical knockout.

This would prove to be the last Heavyweight title fight to be scheduled for 15 rounds.

== Undercard ==
Confirmed bouts:

Heavyweight, Swats McAllister defeats Gwelb Kohoots, 0:18 Round 1, KO

== Broadcasting ==
Country	Broadcaster
United Kingdom	ITV
United States	HBO

Preceded by vs. Tony Tucker	Mike Tyson's bouts October 16, 1987	Succeeded by vs. Larry Holmes
Preceded by vs. Lorenzo Boyd	Tyrell Biggs's bouts October 16, 1987	Succeeded by vs. Francesco Damiani
