= Mike Tyson vs. Pinklon Thomas =

Boxing competition

Hard Road to Glory
- Date: May 30, 1987
- Venue: Las Vegas Hilton, Paradise, Nevada
- Title(s) on the line: WBA and WBC heavyweight titles

Tale of the tape
Boxer	Mike Tyson	Pinklon Thomas
Nickname	Iron	Pink
Hometown	Catskill, New York	Los Angeles, California
Pre-fight record	29–0 (26 KO)	29–1–1 (24 KO)
Age	20 years, 11 months	29 years, 3 months
Height	5 ft 10 in (178 cm)	6 ft 3 in (191 cm)
Weight	218 3/4 lb (99 kg)	217 3/4 lb (99 kg)
Style	Orthodox	Orthodox
Recognition	WBA and WBC; Heavyweight Champion; The Ring; No. 1 Ranked Heavyweight	WBC; No. 1 Ranked Heavyweight; WBA; No. 3 Ranked Heavyweight; The Ring; No. 2 Ranked Heavyweight

Result
- Tyson wins via 6th-round TKO

Mike Tyson vs. Pinklon Thomas, billed as Hard Road to Glory, was a professional boxing match contested on May 30, 1987, for the WBA and WBC heavyweight championships.

== Background ==
This fight, along with the Tucker-Douglas fight that preceded it and served as the co-main event of the broadcast, were the two penultimate matches in HBO’s Heavyweight World Series; this was a tournament devised by the three major world sanctioning bodies, HBO, and promoter Don King to unify the heavyweight championships and crown an undisputed champion.

To this point in the tournament, which began when Trevor Berbick defeated Thomas to win the WBC title in March of 1986, Tyson had already won two of the three available titles, knocking out Berbick in Berbick’s first title defense later in 1986 and then defeating James "Bonecrusher" Smith by unanimous decision earlier in 1987 to win the WBA title.

Meanwhile, as the bout between Tyson and Thomas was signed, another was ordered to settle the IBF championship as reigning champion Michael Spinks, who had entered the tournament as champion and had already defeated Larry Holmes and Steffen Tangstad during its course, was to face challenger Tony Tucker, with the winner meeting either Tyson or Thomas in the final match to unify the titles. However, Spinks elected to pursue a more lucrative fight with former contender Gerry Cooney, and the IBF responded by stripping Spinks of their championship. Tucker and James Douglas, the top two contenders, were then paired to fight for the vacant IBF title and the bout was signed for the same night as Tyson vs. Thomas.

== The fights ==
=== Undercard ===
Former champions Greg Page and Tony Tubbs fought in undercard matches, with Page defeating James Broad and Tubbs defeating Jerry Halstead.

=== Tucker vs Douglas ===
In the co-feature for the vacant IBF championship, Tucker recovered from a slow start to defeated Douglas by knockout in the tenth round.

Tucker hurt Douglas with right hand a minute into the 10th round, knocked him into the ropes where Tucker launched a prolonged assault which prompted Mills Lane to wave it off.

At the time of the stoppage Tucker led on one card 86–85, Douglas led on another by the same score while the third had it even at 86–86.

=== Main Event ===
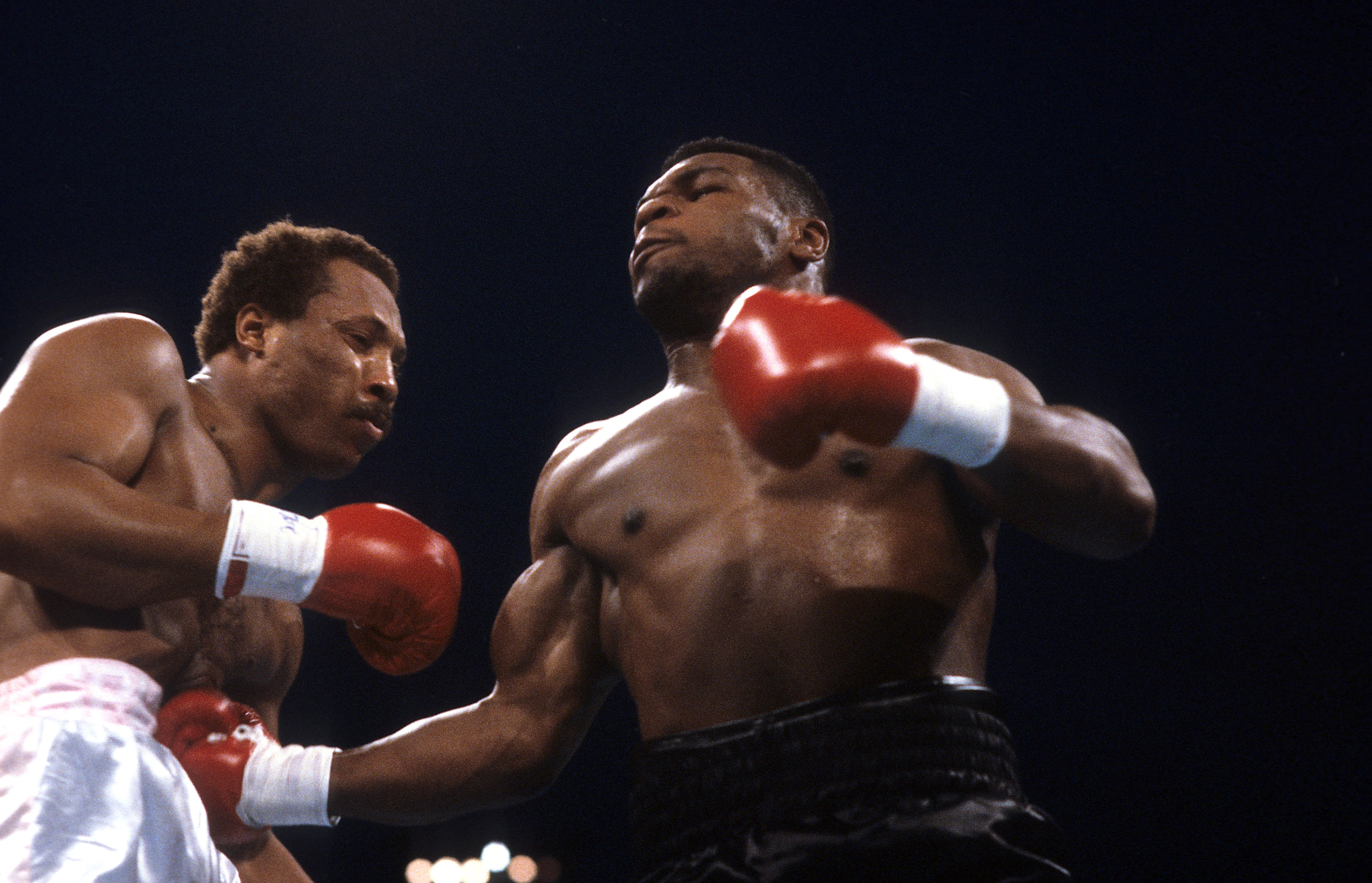

Tyson was the aggressor for nearly the entire fight, constantly getting the better of Thomas with his power punches. Tyson was nearly able to get the victory in the first round. With about 40 seconds left in the round, Tyson staggered Thomas with a left hook–right hook combination. With Thomas' back now against the ropes, Tyson delivered an 8-punch combination in an attempt to get the knockout victory, but Thomas was able withstand Tyson's assault and survived the round without being knocked down. Thomas was able to rebound and last another four full rounds with Tyson, using his left jab to keep Tyson off-stride while clinching Tyson whenever Tyson came close. The fight would come to an end with a minute remaining in round 6. 30 seconds into the second minute, Tyson was able to catch Thomas with a left hook that clearly hurt the challenger. Tyson would follow this with a relentless 15-punch combination that dropped Thomas to the canvas for the first time in his professional career. Before referee Carlos Padilla, Jr. could reach the count of 10, Thomas' trainer Angelo Dundee entered the ring causing Padilla to stop the fight and officially declare the result a technical knockout victory for Tyson.

== Aftermath ==
Tyson extended his winning streak to 29 fights. In his next fight Tyson took on and defeated Tucker, becoming the first man since Leon Spinks to be undisputed champion and the first to do it with three world titles.

Thomas never contended for a major title again, and his trainer Angelo Dundee elected to stop training him following his loss. He would return to the ring in 1988 and fought until 1993.

== Undercard ==
Confirmed bouts:

== Broadcasting ==
Country	Broadcaster
United Kingdom	ITV
United States	HBO

Preceded by vs. James Smith	Mike Tyson's bouts May 30, 1987	Succeeded by vs. Tony Tucker
Preceded by vs. Danny Sutton	Pinklon Thomas's bouts May 30, 1987	Succeeded by vs. Evander Holyfield
