= Long count =

Boxing term

Long count or slow count is a term used in boxing. When a boxer is knocked down in a fight, the referee will count over them and the boxer must rise to their feet, unaided, by the count of ten or else deemed to have been knocked out. A long count occurs when a boxer is given more than the allotted time (a notional ten seconds) to rise to their feet.

== History ==
There have always been controversial counts in boxing. In 1900, Terry McGovern was reputedly down for up to 20 seconds after being floored by Oscar Gardner; McGovern knocked Gardner out in the next round. In 1915, Bombardier Billy Wells received a long count in his fight with Dick Smith. When Wells was knocked down, referee Tom Dunning, officiating from outside the ring, did not begin the count until he had climbed into the ring, which gave Wells an extra six seconds to recover.

The term is now often associated with Jack Dempsey's 1927 heavyweight championship fight against Gene Tunney. In the seventh round, Dempsey knocked Tunney down, but did not go to a neutral corner as a new rule required him to. Referee Dave Barry did not start counting over Tunney until he had ushered Dempsey to a neutral corner, wasting several seconds. Tunney rose to his feet, having been on the canvas for around 17 seconds, and went on to win a decision, thus retaining his title. The controversy over the long count ensured the fight went down in history as The Battle of the Long Count.

Since then, there have been many other fights which have had a long count controversy. Archie Moore maintained that Rocky Marciano had received extra time to recover when the referee erroneously gave Marciano a standing eight count after being knocked down by Moore in their 1955 fight. In their 1965 rematch, Sonny Liston was knocked down by Muhammad Ali but, in the confusion that followed, Liston was down for more than 10 seconds before getting up and resuming the fight. At Nat Fleischer's prompting, referee Jersey Joe Walcott then stopped the fight 17 seconds after the knockdown. In a 1966 match, referee Billy Conn was accused of giving Carlos Ortíz a long count against Sugar Ramos, which led to a rematch being ordered.

In February 1990, following James "Buster" Douglas' upset victory over Mike Tyson, Tyson's camp led by Don King tried to overturn the result, arguing that Douglas had spent between 13 and 14 seconds on the canvas after being knocked down by Tyson in an earlier round, and had therefore been knocked out first. Manny Pacquiao's camp alleged Juan Manuel Márquez received a slow count from Joe Cortez in their 2004 featherweight title bout. Lucian Bute's 2008 fight with Librado Andrade had a long count controversy which drew comparisons with Dempsey-Tunney. Bute, ahead on points, was knocked down in the final seconds of the bout, rose at the count of six, and then the referee interrupted the count in order to send Andrade back to a neutral corner. By the time the count had finished, twenty seconds had elapsed.

== Timing ==
Despite the Marquess of Queensberry Rules stipulating that a fighter has ten seconds to rise from a knockdown, studies of knockouts have shown that a referee's ten count does not typically last ten seconds. When Billy Conn was counted out against Joe Louis, the count lasted 12.4 seconds. Several Mike Tyson opponents were given a ten count which lasted over ten seconds. In Tyson's fight with Douglas, Douglas received a ten count which lasted 14 seconds. Ingemar Johansson was thought to have got a short count after being knocked down by Floyd Patterson in their 1961 rubbermatch, having been counted out despite rising a split second before the referee reached ten. Film footage showed Johansson had actually been down for between 11 and 12 seconds. Ultimately, a referee's ten count is rarely a precise ten seconds; rather, it is simply a human's count to ten and the referee's count is final.

== See also ==
- The Long Count Fight
