= Tyrell Biggs =

American boxer (born 1960)

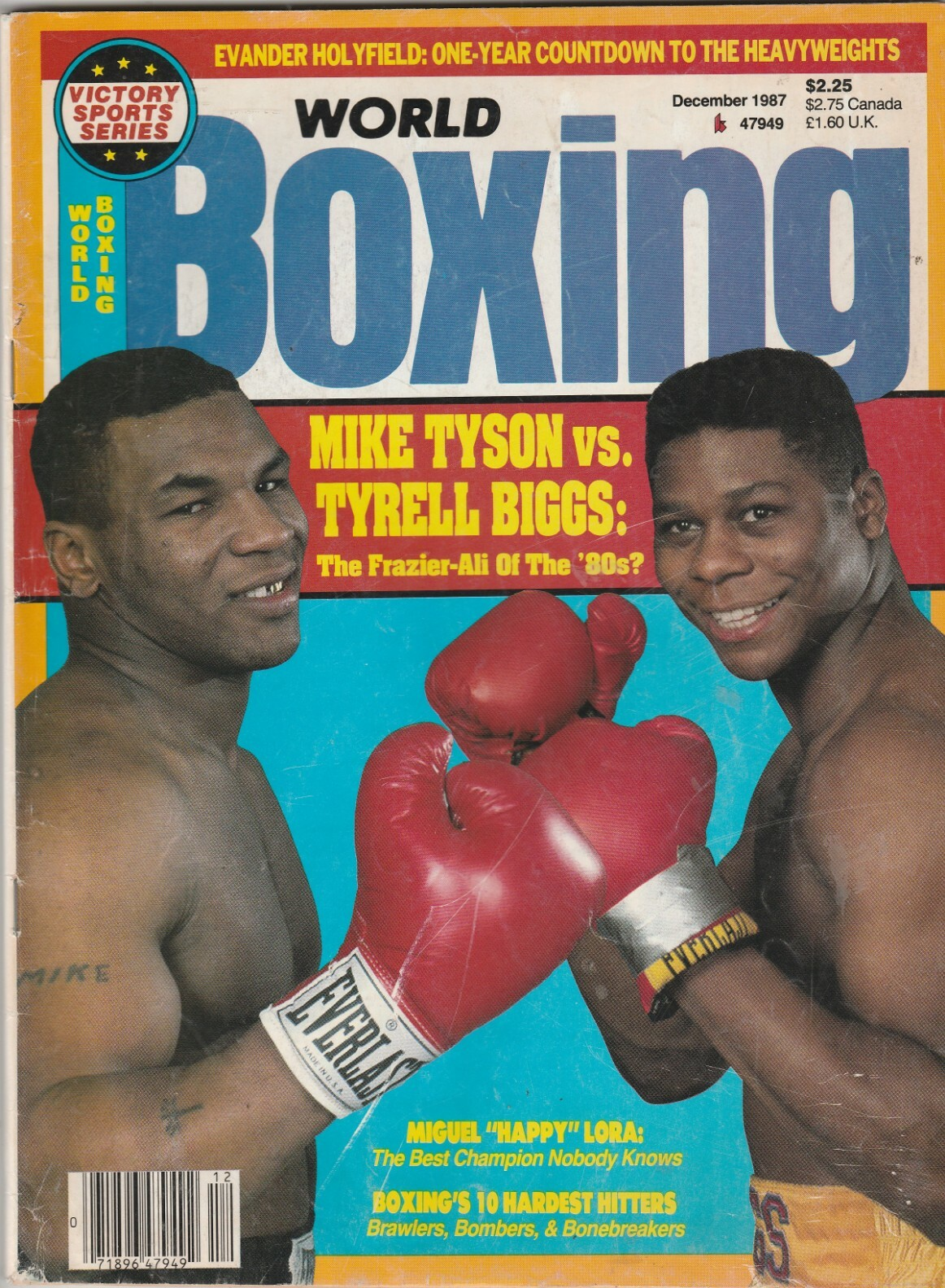
- Biggs (right) on the cover of an issue of World Boxing magazine, cover dated December 1987

Personal information
- Born: December 22, 1960 (age 65) Philadelphia, Pennsylvania, U.S.
- Height: 6 ft 5 in (196 cm)
- Weight: Heavyweight

Boxing career
- Reach: 80 in (203 cm)
- Stance: Orthodox

Boxing record
- Total fights: 40
- Wins: 30
- Win by KO: 20
- Losses: 10
Medal record
Men's amateur boxing
Representing United States
Olympic Games
Gold medal – first place	1984 Los Angeles	Super heavyweight
World Championships
Gold medal – first place	Munich 1982	Super heavyweight
Pan American Games
Bronze medal – third place	Caracas 1983	Super heavyweight

Tyrell Biggs (born December 22, 1960) is an American former professional boxer who competed from 1984 to 1998, and challenged once for the undisputed heavyweight world title in 1987. As an amateur he won a gold medal at the 1984 Summer Olympics, having previously won bronze at the 1983 Pan American Games and gold at the 1982 World Championships, all in the super heavyweight division.

== Early life ==
Biggs was born in Philadelphia, Pennsylvania, making his sporting debut playing basketball at West Philadelphia High. He was a starting forward for the Speedboys' Public League and City champions in 1978, a team that extended a state-record winning streak to 68 before a regular season loss to Overbrook. In '77, one of Biggs' teammates was Gene Banks, who went on to excel at Duke and play in the NBA. After his initial boxing successes, he changed his name to "Tyrell".

== Amateur career ==
Biggs' first major success as an amateur boxer was winning the gold medal at the 1981 United States National Boxing Championships in the super-heavyweight division. He repeated this feat the next year, and also in 1982 he won the World Championships in Munich, West Germany, where in the final he defeated Francesco Damiani from Italy on points, who beat the legendary Cuban veteran Teofilo Stevenson earlier in the competition. In 1983, Biggs won a bronze medal at the Pan American Games, losing to future professional challenger Jorge Luis Gonzalez in the semi-final. In addition, Biggs won a 3–2 split decision over Cuban Angel Milian, who had beaten Greg Page five years earlier.

In 1984, Biggs won the gold medal at the Summer Olympics in Los Angeles, California, defeating future Olympic gold medallist and professional world champion Lennox Lewis in the quarter-finals. In the gold medal bout, Biggs beat Damiani on points again.

Biggs finished his amateur career with an outstanding record of 108–6–4.

== Professional career ==
He turned professional soon after his Olympic victory, scoring a 6-round unanimous decision over Mike Evans on November 15, 1984 at Madison Square Garden in New York City in his first bout. Besides Mike Tyson, Lewis and Damiani he went on to face such other boxing luminaries as James "Quick" Tillis, Ossie Ocasio, Riddick Bowe, Tony Tubbs, Buster Mathis, Jr., and Larry Donald before ending his career with a second-round knockout of Carlton Davis in 1998. He did not win a title, but stalked the rankings of contendership for much of the mid- to late 1980s.

=== Biggs vs. Tyson ===
Biggs' biggest professional fight was against Tyson, for the latter's undisputed heavyweight world title. Biggs and Tyson disliked each other, and Biggs derided Tyson before the fight. Biggs attempted to outbox Tyson, using his jab and movement. But Tyson kept coming in and landing big punches, wearing him down until the fight was stopped in the seventh. Tyson admitted after the fight to "carrying" Biggs so as to inflict more damage, in retaliation for Biggs' pre-match comments.

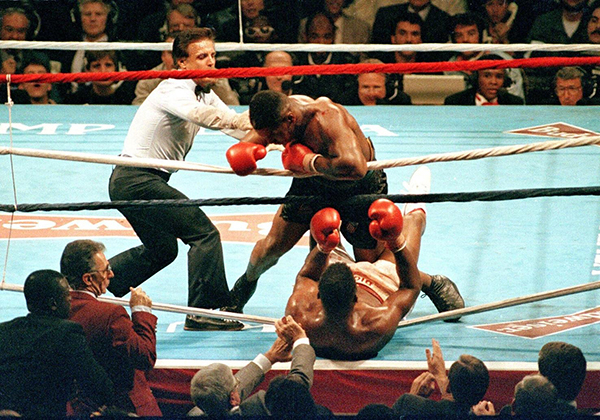
Tyson knocks Biggs down for the first time in the 7th-round, 1987.

He undertook drug rehabilitation a few months after turning professional, and some declare that his career at the time of the Tyson fight was already effectively over. Biggs' robe was sometimes emblazoned with, "Realize your potential", a drug rehabilitation mantra. An article published when he was 40 years old characterized him as "still fighting between stints in rehabilitation."

== Outside the ring ==
Biggs competed in the American Gladiators season 5 Gold Medal Challenge of Champions in 1993, losing to 1984 Gold Downhill Skiing medalist Bill Johnson. A feature documentary about Tyrell Biggs' life is currently in production.

== Professional boxing record ==
40 fights	30 wins	10 losses
By knockout	20	7
By decision	10	3

No.	Result	Record	Opponent	Type	Round, time	Date	Location	Notes
40	Win	30–10	(United States) Carlton Davis	KO	2	Aug 27, 1998	(United States) Atlanta, Georgia, U.S.	
39	Loss	29–10	(United States) Larry Donald	KO	2 (10), 1:00	Sep 11, 1997	(United States) Foxwoods Resort Casino, Ledyard, Connecticut, U.S.	
38	Win	29–9	(United States) Alonzo Hollis	PTS	6	Feb 19, 1997	(United States) Louisville, Kentucky, U.S.	
37	Win	28–9	(United States) Andre Crowder	TKO	1	Jan 11, 1997	(United States) Royal Oaks Center, Mount Washington, Kentucky, U.S.	
36	Loss	27–9	(Haiti) Ray Anis	TKO	3 (10), 2:55	Apr 4, 1994	Korakuen Hall, Tokyo, Japan	
35	Loss	27–8	(United States) Buster Mathis Jr.	UD	12	Feb 5, 1994	(United States) The Aladdin, Paradise, Nevada, U.S.	For vacant USBA heavyweight title
34	Win	27–7	(Russia) Evgeny Sudakov	SD	3	Dec 3, 1993	(United States) Casino Magic, Bay St. Louis, Mississippi, U.S.	
33	Win	26–7	(Canada) Shane Sutcliffe	TKO	2 (3), 3:00	Dec 3, 1993	(United States) Casino Magic, Bay St. Louis, Mississippi, U.S.	
32	Loss	25–7	(United States) Tony Tubbs	UD	3	Dec 3, 1993	(United States) Casino Magic, Bay St. Louis, Mississippi, U.S.	
31	Loss	25–6	(United States) Mike Hunter	UD	12	Jan 17, 1993	(United States) Union Plaza Hotel and Casino, Las Vegas, Nevada, U.S.	For vacant USBA heavyweight title
30	Win	25–5	(United States) Marion Wilson	UD	10	Dec 8, 1992	(United States) Hyatt Regency, Tampa, Florida, U.S.	
29	Win	24–5	(United States) John Jones	KO	2	Nov 19, 1992	(United States) Days Inn South, Oklahoma City, Oklahoma, U.S.	
28	Win	23–5	(United States) Roy Jobe	KO	1	Jul 18, 1992	(United States) Civic Assembly Center, Muskogee, Oklahoma, U.S.	
27	Win	22–5	(United States) Mike Faulkner	TKO	2	May 29, 1992	(United States) Amarillo, Texas, U.S.	
26	Win	21–5	(United States) Charles Woolard	TKO	1 (8), 2:12	May 7, 1992	(United States) Westin, Tulsa, Oklahoma, U.S.	
25	Win	20–5	(United States) Alan Jamison	KO	1	Apr 18, 1992	(United States) High School Field House, Chandler, Oklahoma, U.S.	
24	Loss	19–5	(United Kingdom) Lennox Lewis	TKO	3 (10), 2:47	Nov 23, 1991	(United States) Omni Coliseum, Atlanta, Georgia, U.S.	
23	Loss	19–4	(United States) Riddick Bowe	TKO	8 (10), 2:17	Mar 2, 1991	(United States) Broadway by the Bay Theater, Atlantic City, New Jersey, U.S.	
22	Win	19–3	(Puerto Rico) Rodolfo Marin	UD	10	Dec 8, 1990	(United States) Convention Hall, Atlantic City, New Jersey, U.S.	
21	Win	18–3	(United States) Rick Kellar	TKO	2	Apr 5, 1990	(United States) The Palace, Auburn Hills, Michigan, U.S.	
20	Win	17–3	(Puerto Rico) Ossie Ocasio	UD	10	Jan 11, 1990	(United States) Trump Plaza Hotel and Casino, Atlantic City, New Jersey, U.S.	
19	Win	16–3	(United States) Bobby Crabtree	TKO	5 (10)	Nov 29, 1989	(United States) The Palace, Auburn Hills, Michigan, U.S.	
18	Loss	15–3	(United Kingdom) Gary Mason	KO	7 (10), 3:00	Oct 4, 1989	(United Kingdom) Royal Albert Hall, London, England	
17	Loss	15–2	(Italy) Francesco Damiani	TKO	5 (10), 1:06	Oct 29, 1988	Palatrussardi, Milan, Italy	
16	Loss	15–1	(United States) Mike Tyson	TKO	7 (15), 2:59	Oct 16, 1987	(United States) Convention Hall, Atlantic City, New Jersey, U.S.	For WBA, WBC, and IBF heavyweight titles
15	Win	15–0	(United States) Lorenzo Boyd	TKO	3, 1:12	Jul 31, 1987	(United States) Memorial Coliseum, Corpus Christi, Texas, U.S.	
14	Win	14–0	(United States) David Bey	TKO	6 (10), 2:15	Mar 7, 1987	(United States) Las Vegas Hilton, Winchester, Nevada, U.S.	
13	Win	13–0	(United States) Renaldo Snipes	UD	10	Dec 12, 1986	(United States) Madison Square Garden, New York City, New York, U.S.	
12	Win	12–0	(United States) Robert Evans	KO	5 (10), 2:35	Oct 29, 1986	(United Kingdom) Alexandra Palace, London, England	
11	Win	11–0	(United States) Percell Davis	UD	10	Sep 14, 1986	(United States) Broadway by the Bay Theater, Atlantic City, New Jersey, U.S.	
10	Win	10–0	(United States) Rodney Smith	RTD	7 (8)	Aug 14, 1986	(United States) Felt Forum, New York City, New York, U.S.	
9	Win	9–0	(United States) Jeff Sims	UD	10	Mar 23, 1986	(United States) Lawlor Events Center, Reno, Nevada, U.S.	
8	Win	8–0	(United States) James Tillis	UD	8	Jan 25, 1986	(United States) Americana Host Farm Resort, Lancaster, Pennsylvania, U.S.	
7	Win	7–0	(United States) Tony Anthony	KO	1, 2:57	Dec 21, 1985	(United States) Pavilion Convention Center, Virginia Beach, Virginia, U.S.	
6	Win	6–0	(United States) Danny Sutton	TKO	7 (8)	Nov 19, 1985	(United States) Landmark Hotel, Metairie, Louisiana, U.S.	
5	Win	5–0	(United States) Sterling Benjamin	TKO	7	Aug 29, 1985	(United States) Omni Coliseum, Atlanta, Georgia, U.S.	
4	Win	4–0	(United States) Eddie Richardson	TKO	3 (6), 1:55	Jul 13, 1985	(United States) Atlantis Hotel and Casino, Atlantic City, New Jersey, U.S.	
3	Win	3–0	(United States) Grady Daniels	RTD	2 (6)	May 17, 1985	(United States) Caesars Tahoe, Stateline, Nevada, U.S.	
2	Win	2–0	(United States) Mike Perkins	TKO	1 (6), 2:50	Apr 20, 1985	(United States) Memorial Coliseum, Corpus Christi, Texas, U.S.	
1	Win	1–0	(United States) Mike Ronay Evans	UD	6	Nov 15, 1984	(United States) Madison Square Garden, New York City, New York, U.S.	

Sporting positions
Amateur boxing titles
Inaugural champion	U.S. super heavyweight champion 1981, 1982	Next: Warren Thompson
