= Tony Tucker =

American boxer (born 1958)

Personal information
- Nickname: TNT
- Born: Tony Craig Tucker; December 27, 1958 (age 67) Grand Rapids, Michigan, U.S.
- Height: 6 ft 5 in (196 cm)
- Weight: Heavyweight

Boxing career
- Reach: 82 in (208 cm)
- Stance: Orthodox

Boxing record
- Total fights: 65
- Wins: 57
- Win by KO: 47
- Losses: 7
- No contests: 1
Medal record
Men's amateur boxing
Representing United States
Pan American Games
Gold medal – first place	1979 San Juan	Light heavyweight
World Cup
Gold medal – first place	1979 New York	Light heavyweight

Tony Craig Tucker (born December 27, 1958) is an American former professional boxer who competed from 1980 to 1998. He won the IBF heavyweight world title in 1987, and was the shortest-reigning world heavyweight champion at just 64 days. In an interview with Barry Tompkins, he referred to himself as the "invisible champion," due to the press and general public largely neglecting him. He is best known for giving a young Mike Tyson a close fight, in which he, in the words of Larry Merchant, "rocked Tyson" in the first round. However, Tyson went on to win a unanimous decision. As an amateur, he won the 1979 United States national championships, the 1979 World Cup, and a gold medal at the 1979 Pan American Games, all in the light heavyweight division.

== Amateur career ==
Tony Tucker became a boxer under influence of his father Bob Tucker, also a former amateur boxer, who became his trainer and manager, put all his wealth into the development of his son's boxing career. Tony fought out of Grand Rapids, Michigan, competing almost his entire amateur career in the light heavyweight division with his billed weight at the 1979 Pan American Games exactly matching the weight limit of the division (178 lbs).

Robert Surkein, the national boxing chairman for the Amateur Athletic Union, said of Tucker: “Believe me, he's better than Leon Spinks. Spinks couldn't hold this kid's gloves at a comparable stage.” Rollie Schwartz, past national chairman of the AAU Boxing Commission, said of Tucker prior to the Olympics, "Tucker is a combination boxer and puncher, much akin to Joe Louis. He comes right at you. I'd take him tomorrow over the two so-called light Heavyweight champs."

=== Highlights ===
United States National Championships, Biloxi, Mississippi, April 1978:

- 1/8: Defeated Jerry Bennett by decision
- 1/2: Lost to Charles Singleton by decision

U.S. National Sports Festival, Fort Carson, Colorado, July 1978:

- Finals: Lost to Elmer Martin by decision

(gold) United States National Championships, Lake Charles, Louisiana, May 1979:

- 1/2: Defeated Kelvin Anderson by decision
- Finals: Defeated Andre McCoy by decision

Pan Am Trials, Toledo, Ohio, May–June 1979:

- 1/2: Defeated Elliott Chavis by decision
- Finals: Defeated Andre McCoy by decision

(gold) Pan American Games, Roberto Clemente Coliseum, San Juan, Puerto Rico, July 1979:

- 1/4: Defeated Sixto Soria (Cuba) by majority decision, 4–1 (Tucker got cut over his left eye at 1:03 of the 3rd round)
- 1/2: Defeated Patrick Fennel (Canada) RSC 3
- Finals: Defeated Dennis Jackson (Puerto Rico) by unanimous decision, 5–0 (Jackson knocked down at 1:46 of the 1st rd)

(gold) World Cup, Felt Forum, New York City, October 1979:

- 1/4: Defeated Benny Pike (Australia) by unanimous decision, 5–0
- 1/2: Defeated Kurt Seiler (West Germany) by unanimous decision, 5–0
- Finals: Defeated Albert Nikolyan (Soviet Union) by unanimous decision, 5–0

International Duals

- February 1, 1979, Blackham Coliseum, Lafayette, Louisiana: Lost to Nikolay Yerofeyev (Soviet Union) by decision
- February 11, 1979, Estadio Latinamericano, Havana, Cuba: Lost to Hermenegildo Báez (Cuba) by decision
- February 24, 1979, Blackham Coliseum, Lafayette, Louisiana: Defeated Jacek Kucharczyk (Poland) by split decision, 2–1
- February 10, 1980, Charlotte Coliseum, Charlotte, North Carolina: Defeated Orestes Pedroso (Cuba)
- February 25, 1980, Blaisdell Arena, Honolulu, Hawaii: Defeated Ene Saipaia (Hawaii)
- March 1980, Schwerin, East Germany: Lost to Herbert Bauch (East Germany) by walkover
- March 1980, Schwerin, East Germany: Lost to Werner Kohnert (East Germany) by split decision, 1–2
- March 1980, Rostock, East Germany: Lost to Jürgen Fanghänel (East Germany) DQ 1

=== 1980 Olympics ===
Since 1979 Tony Tucker anticipated participating in the Moscow Olympics. Tucker was an alternate for the United States Olympic Team for the 1980 Summer Olympics (Lee Roy Murphy qualified as the prime.) President Jimmy Carter ordered to boycott the Olympics, which led the U.S. Team to cancel its participation in the Olympics, instead it embarked on a series of exhibitions in Europe. On March 14, 1980, en route to Poland, the U.S. boxing team's flight crashed near Warsaw with no survivors. Several people, including Tony Tucker, missed the flight and stayed in the United States due to various reasons, in Tucker's case an injury sustained just prior to the accident. At that point Tucker became religious, believing that God spared his life for a purpose, in order for him to become the heavyweight champion of the world. Shortly thereafter Tucker turned pro.

Tucker finished his amateur career having 121 fights under his belt, with a record of 115–6.

== Professional career ==
After turning pro in 1980, Tucker's early fights were often shown on NBC, as part of a collection known as "Tomorrow's Champions".

Tucker's progress in the professional ranks was slow. He was injury-prone, missing more than a year with a knee injury suffered in a bout against Danny Sutton. Tucker also changed managers and trainers several times; his father, Bob Tucker, eventually performed both roles. After enjoying a high profile upon his professional debut, Tucker boxed in non-televised bouts for the majority of the 1980s.

In June 1984, he scored a win by knocking out Eddie "The Animal" Lopez in nine rounds on the undercard of the Tommy Hearns–Roberto Durán fight. It was the first time Lopez had ever been knocked down. Tucker followed it up in September by outpointing Jimmy Young .

In September 1986, Tucker finally landed a big fight, against 242 lb James "Broad-Axe" Broad, for the USBA belt and a world title eliminator. Tucker won by unanimous decision.

=== IBF heavyweight champion ===
==== Tucker vs Douglas ====
Home Box Office and Don King Productions orchestrated a heavyweight unification series for 1987, planning among its bouts a match between Tucker and reigning IBF champion Michael Spinks. Spinks refused to face Tucker, opting instead for a more lucrative bout with Gerry Cooney. The IBF stripped Spinks of the championship on February 19, mandating that Tucker (as its #1-ranked contender) face its number-two contender, Buster Douglas, the very man who would eventually dethrone Tyson. As the co-feature of reining unified champion Mike Tyson and ex-champ Pinklon Thomas, Tucker won the bout and the vacant IBF crown via tenth-round technical knockout.

==== Tucker vs. Tyson ====
Tucker, as the IBF heavyweight world champion, was obliged to immediately defend his title in a unification bout with WBA and WBC champion Mike Tyson 64 days after winning the title, in what would be the tournament final, where Tucker was a 10-to-1 underdog. Before Tucker was managed by Emmanuel Steward, who received a negotiated percent of each payday. By that time for that same purpose a joint venture named Tucker Inc. was formed by his promoters Cedric Kushner (18% of total share), and Josephine Abercrombie with Jeff Levine (also 18%), partnering with Dennis Rappaport and Alan Kornberg (13%,) and lastly Emmanuel Steward (6%). His father Bob Tucker also secured a share in Tucker Inc. (12%)

Before the fight versus Tyson, Tucker had been on an eight-year-long winning streak, his last defeat was in 1979, while competing in amateurs.

Despite having a broken right hand, Tucker faced Tyson on August 1, 1987. Tyson defeated Tucker by unanimous decision to unify the three championship titles, leaving Tucker with the shortest world championship reign in the history of the heavyweight division (64 days). According to the HBO Punch Statistics, Tucker landed 174 of 452 punches thrown, while Tyson landed 216 of 412, and in fact outjabbed Tucker, who had more than a 10-inch reach advantage (81 1/2" to 71").

HBO host and boxing great Sugar Ray Leonard said: "What Tucker displayed tonight was the fact that he is a non-conformist. He did what a lot of us thought he couldn't do, and that's why I respect him so much, because he boxed, he clinched, he was very strategic, very tactical, very intelligent fighter."

Coincidentally, this exact scenario would unfold again eight years later to give Tucker another title shot.

=== Comeback ===
Tucker returned to boxing in 1989 and was back in Don King's stable by 1992. He won the NABF belt with a 12-round split decision over highly-ranked Orlin Norris and successfully defended it against future world champion Oliver McCall, winning another 12-round split decision. He finished 1992 with a sixth-round TKO of Frankie Swindell and earned himself another world title shot.

Tucker had run his record up to 48–1 and challenged Lennox Lewis for the WBC world heavyweight title in May 1993. Lewis won a 12-round unanimous decision, knocking the challenger down twice in the process. The 34-year-old Tucker had never been on the floor in his professional career until this bout.

"They tried to force me to fight Tony Tucker. And I remember looking at Tony Tucker, and saying, 'Mama didn't raise no fools. I'm not fighting him.' And they took the titles. Some people I'm not gonna fight. That's the good reason. I didn't want to fight him. Too tough."

— George Foreman, on his refusal to fight Tucker.

After beating Michael Moorer in November 1994 to become the oldest world heavyweight champion in history, George Foreman began negotiations in early 1995 to make the first defense of his WBA and IBF titles against German mid-level prospect Axel Schulz. As Schulz was not ranked by either organization, Foreman could not defend their championships against Schulz without their permission.

The IBF granted Foreman permission to face Schulz, which Foreman ultimately did. However, the WBA refused, insisting that Foreman instead face Tucker, their organization's #1-ranked contender.

The situation in which Tucker had found himself in 1987 now played out again: the WBA vacated the title due to Foreman's non-compliance, setting up an April 1995 title bout between Tucker and number-two contender Bruce Seldon. Seldon won by TKO after seven rounds when doctors stopped the fight due to Tucker's eye closing shut.

Tucker lost his chance at a rematch later that year when he lost a ten-round decision to a newly-signed Don King heavyweight, British-Nigerian boxer Henry Akinwande.

In 1996 he was outpointed by old rival Orlin Norris. He scored two low-key wins in California, and in 1997 traveled to the U.K. to challenge Herbie Hide for the vacant WBO title. Tucker was dropped three times en route to a second-round knockout.

In 1998 Tucker challenged John Ruiz for his NABF belt. Despite a big sixth round in which he had Ruiz in trouble, Tucker was eventually stopped in the 11th round.

He came back in May to knock out journeyman Billy Wright in one round, but later had his license revoked due to medical concerns about Tucker's vision.

== Professional boxing record ==
65 fights	57 wins	7 losses
By knockout	47	3
By decision	10	4
No contests	1	

No.	Result	Record	Opponent	Type	Round, time	Date	Location	Notes
65	Win	57–7 (1)	Billy Wright	KO	1 (10), 2:08	May 7, 1998	Sam's Town Hotel & Casino, Tunica, Mississippi, U.S.	
64	Loss	56–7 (1)	John Ruiz	TKO	11 (12), 0:58	Jan 31, 1998	Ice Palace, Tampa, Florida, U.S.	For NABF heavyweight title
63	Win	56–6 (1)	Jerry Haynes	TKO	3 (10)	Dec 16, 1997	Music City Mix Factory, Nashville, Tennessee, U.S.	
62	Win	55–6 (1)	Abdul Muhaymin	UD	10	Nov 18, 1997	Music City Mix Factory, Nashville, Tennessee, U.S.	
61	Loss	54–6 (1)	Herbie Hide	TKO	2 (12), 2:45	Jun 28, 1997	Sports Village, Norwich, England	For vacant WBO heavyweight title
60	Win	54–5 (1)	Tyrone Campbell	KO	3 (10), 2:16	Dec 16, 1996	Fantasy Springs Resort Casino, Indio, California, U.S.	
59	Win	53–5 (1)	David Dixon	KO	1 (12), 2:24	Jun 29, 1996	Fantasy Springs Resort Casino, Indio, California, U.S.	Won vacant NABF heavyweight title
58	Loss	52–5 (1)	Orlin Norris	MD	10	Feb 24, 1996	Coliseum, Richmond, Virginia, U.S.	
57	Loss	52–4 (1)	Henry Akinwande	UD	10	Dec 16, 1995	CoreStates Spectrum, Philadelphia, Pennsylvania, U.S.	
56	Loss	52–3 (1)	Bruce Seldon	RTD	7 (12), 3:00	Apr 8, 1995	Caesars Palace, Paradise, Nevada, U.S.	For vacant WBA heavyweight title
55	Win	52–2 (1)	Dan Murphy	TKO	3	Dec 10, 1994	Estadio de Béisbol, Monterrey, Mexico	
54	Win	51–2 (1)	Cecil Coffee	TKO	2 (10)	Jul 2, 1994	The Mirage, Paradise, Nevada, U.S.	
53	Win	50–2 (1)	George Stephens	TKO	1 (10)	Feb 19, 1994	Coliseum, Charlotte, North Carolina, U.S.	
52	Win	49–2 (1)	David Graves	TKO	2	Dec 18, 1993	Estadio Cuauhtémoc, Puebla City, Mexico	
51	Loss	48–2 (1)	Lennox Lewis	UD	12	May 8, 1993	Thomas & Mack Center, Paradise, Nevada, U.S.	For WBC heavyweight title
50	Win	48–1 (1)	Frankie Swindell	RTD	6 (10), 3:00	Dec 13, 1992	The Mirage, Paradise, Nevada, U.S.	
49	Win	47–1 (1)	Paul Poirier	TKO	4 (10)	Nov 7, 1992	Caesars Tahoe, Stateline, Nevada, U.S.	
48	Win	46–1 (1)	Everett Martin	PTS	10	Sep 12, 1992	Thomas & Mack Center, Paradise, Nevada, U.S.	
47	Win	45–1 (1)	Oliver McCall	SD	10	Jun 26, 1992	CSU Convocation Center, Cleveland, Ohio, U.S.	Retained NABF heavyweight title
46	Win	44–1 (1)	Jesus Contreras	TKO	6 (10), 1:27	Apr 22, 1992	Brendan Byrne Arena, East Rutherford, New Jersey, U.S.	
45	Win	43–1 (1)	Mike Faulkner	KO	2	Apr 10, 1992	Toreo de Cuatro Caminos, Mexico City, Mexico	
44	Win	42–1 (1)	Kimmuel Odum	TKO	2 (10), 1:40	Feb 15, 1992	The Mirage, Paradise, Nevada, U.S.	
43	Win	41–1 (1)	Orlin Norris	SD	12	Jun 3, 1991	Caesars Palace, Paradise, Nevada, U.S.	Won NABF heavyweight title
42	Win	40–1 (1)	James Ray Thomas	KO	1 (10), 1:43	Apr 29, 1991	Great Western Forum, Inglewood, California, U.S.	
41	Win	39–1 (1)	Lionel Washington	KO	1 (12), 1:11	Jan 28, 1991	Great Western Forum, Inglewood, California, U.S.	Won California State heavyweight title
40	Win	38–1 (1)	Mike Rouse	TKO	5 (10), 2:27	Jul 19, 1990	Kingdome, Seattle, Washington, U.S.	
39	Win	37–1 (1)	Mike Evans	UD	10	Mar 8, 1990	Great Western Forum, Inglewood, California, U.S.	
38	Win	36–1 (1)	Calvin Jones	KO	5 (10), 2:09	Jan 8, 1990	Great Western Forum, Inglewood, California, U.S.	
37	Win	35–1 (1)	Dino Homsey	KO	3 (10), 1:37	Dec 12, 1989	Memorial Sports Arena, Los Angeles, California, U.S.	
36	Loss	34–1 (1)	Mike Tyson	UD	12	Aug 1, 1987	Las Vegas Hilton, Winchester, Nevada, U.S.	Lost IBF heavyweight title; For WBA and WBC heavyweight titles
35	Win	34–0 (1)	Buster Douglas	TKO	10 (15), 1:36	May 30, 1987	Las Vegas Hilton, Winchester, Nevada, U.S.	Won vacant IBF heavyweight title
34	Win	33–0 (1)	James Broad	UD	12	Sep 26, 1986	Convention Hall, Atlantic City, New Jersey, U.S.	Won vacant USBA heavyweight title
33	Win	32–0 (1)	Otis Bates	KO	2	Aug 7, 1986	Houston, Texas, U.S.	
32	Win	31–0 (1)	Eddie Richardson	KO	4 (10)	Jul 10, 1986	Houston, Texas, U.S.	
31	Win	30–0 (1)	Eddie Richardson	UD	10	Feb 27, 1986	Cobo Arena, Detroit, Michigan, U.S.	
30	Win	29–0 (1)	David Jaco	TKO	3	Oct 19, 1985	Stade Louis II, Monte Carlo, Monaco	
29	Win	28–0 (1)	Bobby Crabtree	TKO	4 (10)	Jun 28, 1985	Hammond, Indiana, U.S.	
28	Win	27–0 (1)	Danny Sutton	UD	10	Nov 2, 1984	Congress Plaza Hotel, Chicago, Illinois, U.S.	
27	Win	26–0 (1)	O. T. Davis	KO	1 (10), 1:58	Nov 2, 1984	Cobo Arena, Detroit, Michigan, U.S.	
26	Win	25–0 (1)	Jimmy Young	UD	10	Sep 22, 1984	Gerald R. Ford Fieldhouse, Grand Rapids, Michigan, U.S.	
25	Win	24–0 (1)	Eddie Lopez	KO	9 (10), 1:26	Jun 15, 1984	Caesars Palace, Paradise, Nevada, U.S.	
24	Win	23–0 (1)	Dave Johnson	TKO	2 (10), 1:16	May 9, 1984	Bismarck Hotel, Chicago, Illinois, U.S.	
23	Win	22–0 (1)	Walter Santemore	TKO	1, 2:29	Apr 19, 1984	Cobo Hall, Detroit, Michigan, U.S.	
22	Win	21–0 (1)	Sam Jeter	KO	1 (10), 1:29	Mar 15, 1984	Congress Plaza Hotel, Chicago, Illinois, U.S.	
21	Win	20–0 (1)	Larry Givens	KO	4 (10), 2:30	Feb 24, 1984	Congress Plaza Hotel, Chicago, Illinois, U.S.	
20	Win	19–0 (1)	James Dixon	TKO	6 (10), 2:58	Dec 20, 1983	Congress Plaza Hotel, Chicago, Illinois, U.S.	
19	Win	18–0 (1)	Lynwood Jones	KO	5 (10), 2:12	Dec 1, 1983	Da Vinci Manor, Chicago, Illinois, U.S.	
18	Win	17–0 (1)	James Holly	TKO	1 (4)	Nov 7, 1983	Da Vinci Manor, Chicago, Illinois, U.S.	
17	NC	16–0 (1)	Danny Sutton	TKO	3 (10)	Aug 12, 1982	Hyatt Regency, Nashville, Tennessee, U.S.	Originally TKO win for Sutton after Tucker was unable to continue from an accidental clash of knees, later ruled NC
16	Win	16–0	Richard Cade	TKO	7	Jul 8, 1982	Sands, Atlantic City, New Jersey, U.S.	
15	Win	15–0	Lupe Guerra	TKO	2, 1:36	Jun 30, 1982	War Memorial Arena, Syracuse, New York, U.S.	
14	Win	14–0	James Dixon	PTS	8	Jun 15, 1982	Tropicana, Atlantic City, New Jersey, U.S.	
13	Win	13–0	Charles Atlas	TKO	1 (10), 2:05	Jun 5, 1982	War Memorial Arena, Syracuse, New York, U.S.	
12	Win	12–0	Grady Daniels	TKO	5	May 18, 1982	Tropicana, Atlantic City, New Jersey, U.S.	
11	Win	11–0	Frank Farmer	KO	1	Oct 17, 1981	Traverse City, Michigan, U.S.	
10	Win	10–0	Harvey Steichen	TKO	3 (8), 0:50	Sep 16, 1981	Caesars Palace, Paradise, Nevada, U.S.	
9	Win	9–0	Jerry Hunter	KO	1	Aug 22, 1981	Glacier Arena, Traverse City, Michigan, U.S.	
8	Win	8–0	Chip Tyler	TKO	7 (8)	Apr 30, 1981	Hacienda Resort Hotel and Casino, Paradise, Nevada, U.S.	
7	Win	7–0	Al Jones	TKO	1 (10)	Apr 9, 1981	Cobo Hall, Detroit, Michigan, U.S.	
6	Win	6–0	Robert Evans	TKO	6 (6)	Feb 23, 1981	Convention Hall, Atlantic City, New Jersey, U.S.	
5	Win	5–0	Willie Kents	KO	1 (6)	Jan 29, 1981	Cobo Hall, Detroit, Michigan, U.S.	
4	Win	4–0	Victor Rodriguez	TKO	2 (6), 2:17	Jan 16, 1981	HemisFair Arena, San Antonio, Texas, U.S.	
3	Win	3–0	Max Smith	KO	5 (6)	Dec 11, 1980	International Amphitheatre, Chicago, Illinois, U.S.	
2	Win	2–0	Jesse Clark	KO	1 (6), 2:04	Dec 2, 1980	Sports Arena, Toledo, Ohio, U.S.	
1	Win	1–0	Chuck Gardner	KO	3 (6), 2:58	Nov 1, 1980	Caesars Tahoe, Stateline, Nevada, U.S.	

== Titles in boxing ==
Major world titles

IBF heavyweight champion (200+ lbs)

Regional/International titles

NABF heavyweight champion (200+ lbs) (2x)

USBA heavyweight champion (200+ lbs)

California state heavyweight champion (200+ lbs)

Sporting positions
Amateur boxing titles
Previous: Elmer Martin	U.S. light heavyweight champion 1979	Next: Jeff Lampkin
Regional boxing titles
Vacant Title last held by Trevor Berbick	USBA heavyweight champion September 26, 1986 – May 30, 1987; Won IBF title	Vacant Title next held by Carl Williams
Preceded by Lionel Washington	California State heavyweight champion January 28, 1991 – February 1993; Vacated	Vacant Title next held by Lionel Butler
Preceded by Orlin Norris	NABF heavyweight champion June 3, 1991 – December 1992; Vacated	Vacant Title next held by Alex García
Vacant Title last held by Alexander Zolkin	NABF heavyweight champion June 29, 1996 – December 1996; Vacated	Vacant Title next held by John Ruiz
World boxing titles
Vacant Title last held by Michael Spinks	IBF heavyweight champion May 30, 1987 – August 1, 1987	Succeeded by Mike Tyson
Records
Preceded by James Smith; 86 days	Shortest world heavyweight title reign 64 days May 30, 1987 – August 1, 1987	Incumbent
