= Buster Douglas =

American boxer (born 1960)

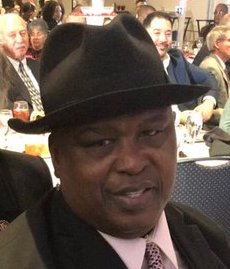
- Douglas in 2020

Personal information
- Born: James Douglas; April 7, 1960 (age 66) Columbus, Ohio, U.S.
- Height: 6 ft 3 1/2 in (192 cm)
- Weight: Heavyweight

Boxing career
- Reach: 83 in (211 cm)
- Stance: Orthodox

Boxing record
- Total fights: 46
- Wins: 38
- Win by KO: 25
- Losses: 6
- Draws: 1
- No contests: 1

James "Buster" Douglas (born April 7, 1960) is an American former professional boxer who competed between 1981 and 1999. He reigned as undisputed world heavyweight champion in 1990 after defeating Mike Tyson in what is regarded as one of the greatest upsets in sports history.

A 42 to 1 underdog against Tyson, who was undefeated and considered to be the best boxer in the world, Douglas won the fight by knockout in the 10th round to claim the WBC, WBA, and IBF titles. After eight months as the world heavyweight champion, he was defeated by Evander Holyfield in his only title defense. Douglas retired following the loss, but returned to boxing in 1996. He retired a second and final time in 1999.

== Early life ==
The son of professional boxer William "Dynamite" Douglas and Lula Pearl Douglas, Douglas grew up in Columbus, Ohio, in the predominantly Black Linden neighborhood of Windsor Terrace. His father ran a gym at the Blackburn Recreation Center near Downtown Columbus and subsequently introduced young James to boxing (in the same way James would later bring his son Lamar to the same gym). He attended Linden McKinley High School, where he played football and basketball, leading Linden to a Class AAA state basketball championship in 1977. After high school, Douglas played basketball for the Coffeyville Community College Red Ravens in Coffeyville, Kansas, from 1977 to 1978; the 17-year-old was a 6'0" power forward. He is in the Coffeyville Community College Men's Basketball Hall of Fame. He also played basketball at Sinclair Community College from 1979 to 1980 in Dayton, Ohio, before attending Mercyhurst University on a basketball scholarship. He moved back to Columbus to focus on boxing.

== Professional career ==
Douglas debuted on May 31, 1981, defeating Dan O'Malley in a four-round bout. He was managed by former Ohio State University assistant football coach John Johnson. Douglas won his first five fights before coming into a fight with David Bey weighing 20 pounds heavier than he usually had for his previous bouts. Bey handed Douglas his first defeat by knocking him out in the second round. After six more fights, all of which he won, Douglas fought Steffen Tangstad to a draw on October 16, 1982. He was penalized two points during the course of the fight, which proved to be the difference on the judges' scorecards.

After the draw, Douglas beat largely journeyman fighters for the next 14 months. Two of his wins were knockouts of Jesse Clark, whom Douglas had also stopped in 1981. Douglas needed just seven total rounds of fighting in the three bouts combined to score the three KOs. In his last fight of 1983, Douglas was dominating opponent Mike White, but White knocked him out in the ninth round.

On November 9, 1984, Douglas was scheduled to face heavyweight contender Trevor Berbick in Las Vegas. Berbick withdrew from the bout three days before it was to take place; Randall "Tex" Cobb elected to take the fight on short notice in Berbick's stead. Douglas defeated the former heavyweight contender by majority decision. The next year, he fought up-and-coming contender Jesse Ferguson. Douglas fought just three times in 1986, defeating former champion Greg Page and fringe contender David Jaco in two of the bouts. This earned him a shot at the International Boxing Federation championship that was stripped from Michael Spinks for refusing to defend it against Tony Tucker. Douglas started well against Tucker and was ahead on points, but he ran out of stamina and suffered a technical knockout in the tenth round.

After the Tucker defeat and a series of disagreements, James split with his father; the Douglas family was shattered. James started business from scratch and hand-picked another team for himself, particularly a new trainer. This helped him win his next four fights. After the false start in 1984, Douglas finally fought Berbick in 1989, winning a unanimous decision. He followed that up with a unanimous decision victory over future heavyweight champion Oliver McCall, which earned him a shot at Mike Tyson for the undisputed heavyweight championship. Tyson became the universally recognized champion after knocking out Spinks in one round in 1988. (Douglas fought on the undercard of that event, defeating Mike Williams by seventh-round TKO.)

=== Undisputed heavyweight champion ===
The Tyson fight was scheduled for February 11, 1990 at the Tokyo Dome in Tokyo. Almost all observers assumed that the bout would be another quick knockout for the champion; no fighter had taken Tyson beyond the fifth round since 1987. Many thought it was a tune-up for Tyson before a future mega-fight with undefeated Evander Holyfield, who had recently moved up to heavyweight after becoming the first undisputed world cruiserweight champion in the history of that weight class. Douglas's chances of lasting deep into the fight against Tyson, let alone winning, were so lightly regarded that only one Las Vegas betting parlor even bothered to establish odds for the fight. That lone casino, the Mirage, made Douglas a 42-to-1 underdog.

Douglas's mother, Lula Pearl, died of a stroke 23 days before the title bout at the age of 46. Douglas had promised his mother that he would beat Tyson before she had died. Douglas, who had trained hard, surprised the world by dominating the fight from the beginning, using his 12-inch reach advantage to perfection. He seemingly hit Tyson at will with jabs and right hands and danced out of range of Tyson's punches. The champion had not taken Douglas seriously, expecting another easy knockout victory just as the overwhelming majority of neutral observers had. He was slow, declining his usual strategy of moving his head and slipping his way inside. Rather, Tyson set his feet and threw big, lunging hooks in efforts to stop Douglas with one punch.

By the fifth round, Tyson's left eye was swelling shut from Douglas's many right hands and ringside HBO announcers proclaimed it was the most punishment they had ever seen the champion absorb. Larry Merchant memorably added, "Well, if Mike Tyson -- who loves pigeons -- was looking for a pigeon in this bout, he hasn't found him." Tyson's cornermen appeared to be unprepared for the suddenly dire situation. They had not brought an endswell or an ice pack to the fight, so they were forced to fill a latex glove with cold tap water and hold it over Tyson's swelling eye. The eye would swell almost completely shut by the end of the fight.

In the eighth round, Tyson landed a right uppercut that knocked Douglas down. The referee's count created controversy as Douglas was on his feet when the referee reached nine, but the official knockdown timekeeper was two seconds ahead. In the ring, however, the final arbiter of the ten-count is the referee, and a comparison with the count issued to Tyson two rounds later revealed that both fighters had received long counts.

Tyson came out aggressively in the ninth round and continued his attempts to end the fight with one big punch, hoping Douglas was still hurt from the eighth-round knockdown. Both men traded punches before Douglas landed a combination that staggered Tyson back to the ropes. With Tyson hurt and dazed, Douglas unleashed a vicious attack to try to finish him off but, amazingly, Tyson withstood the barrage and barely survived the round.

In the tenth round, the damage Douglas had inflicted upon Tyson finally began to take its toll on the champion. Douglas dominated the round from the outset. While setting Tyson up with his jab, Douglas scored a huge uppercut that snapped Tyson's head upward. He followed with a rapid four-punch combination to the head, knocking Tyson down for the first time in the champion's career. Tyson struggled to his knees and picked up his mouthpiece, which was lying on the mat next to him. He awkwardly tried to place it back into his mouth. The image of Tyson's mouthpiece hanging crookedly from his lips would become an enduring image from the fight. He was unable to beat the referee's ten-count, and Douglas was the new world heavyweight champion.

As Douglas said in an interview years later, “I thought Tyson was getting up until I had seen him looking for that mouth piece and then I knew that he was really hurt. So anytime you know you only got ten seconds to get up so you aren’t going to worry about anything but just getting up first. So when I had seen him looking around for that mouth piece I knew he was really hurt.”

Douglas's joy over the victory soon turned to confusion and anger as manager John Johnson informed him in the dressing room that Tyson and Don King were lodging an official protest about the referee's knockdown count in the eighth round. A week later, during a television interview, Douglas said that the protest and the post-fight confusion ruined what should have been the best time of his life.

=== Losing the title ===
Although the IBF immediately recognized Douglas as its champion, the WBA and WBC initially refused due to Tyson's protest. However, Tyson withdrew his protest four days later amid worldwide public outcry and demands from boxing commissions around the world, and Douglas was officially recognized as undisputed heavyweight champion.

While still champion, Douglas appeared on the February 23, 1990 episode of the World Wrestling Federation's The Main Event III, as special guest referee for a rematch between Hulk Hogan and "Macho Man" Randy Savage. Originally, Tyson was scheduled to be the guest referee, but following the upset, the WWF rushed to sign on Douglas for the event. At the end of the match, Douglas was provoked into a kayfabe punch and knockout of Savage, who was the heel wrestler in the match.

The defeated Tyson clamored for a rematch and Douglas was offered more money than he had ever made for a fight. Not wanting to deal with Tyson's camp or his promoter Don King, Douglas decided to make his first defense against #1 contender Evander Holyfield, who had watched the new champion dethrone Tyson from ringside in Tokyo. Douglas went into the October 25, 1990 fight at 246 pounds, 15 pounds heavier than he was for the Tyson match and also the heaviest he had weighed in for a fight since a 1985 bout with Dion Simpson, in which he tipped the scale at just over 247 pounds.

Douglas came out rather sluggish, and was thoroughly dominated by Holyfield during the first two rounds. In the third round Douglas attempted to hit Holyfield with a hard uppercut that he telegraphed. Holyfield avoided the uppercut and knocked an off-balance Douglas to the canvas with a straight right to the chin. Douglas merely lay flat on his back, motionless and disoriented, as referee Mills Lane stopped the fight. Buster Douglas retired after that bout.

=== Later career ===
Douglas vs Holyfield was a reported $24.6 million payday for Douglas. Doing little for the next several years, Douglas gained weight, reaching nearly 400 pounds. It was only after he nearly died during a diabetic coma that he decided to attempt a return to the sport. He went back into training and made a comeback. He was successful at first, winning six straight fights, but his comeback almost came to a halt in a 1997 disqualification win over journeyman Louis Monaco. In a bizarre ending, Monaco landed a right hand, just after the bell ending round one, that knocked Douglas to the canvas. Douglas was unable to continue after a five-minute rest period and was consequently awarded the win by disqualification (on account of Monaco's illegal punch).

A fight with light-heavyweight champion Roy Jones Jr. was touted in the late 1990s, although ultimately fell through. In 1998, having bounced back into a minor stardom, Douglas was knocked out in the first round of a fight with heavyweight contender Lou Savarese, for the lightly regarded IBA heavyweight title. Douglas subsequently had two more fights, winning both, and retired in 1999 with a final record of 38–6–1.

== In the media ==
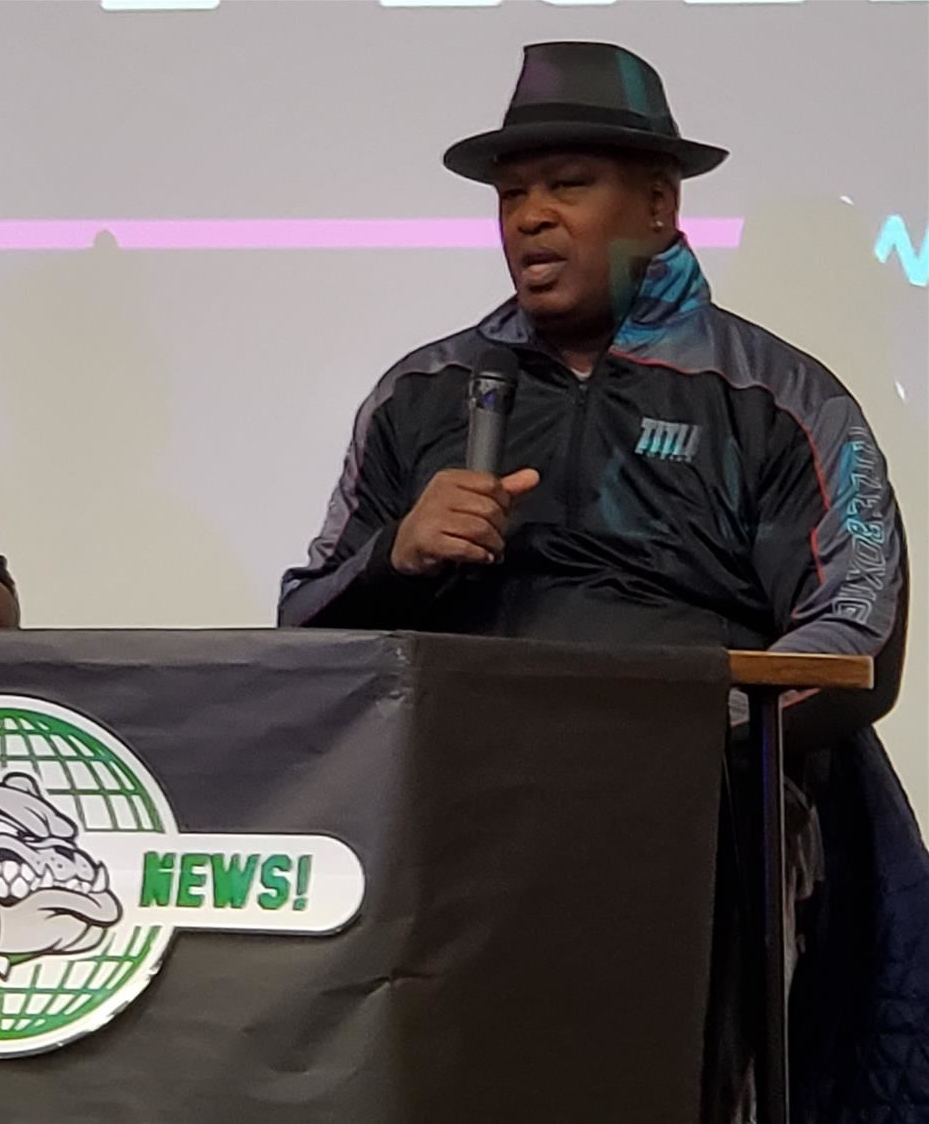
Douglas speaking in 2020.

Douglas made a guest appearance in the 1990s cop show Street Justice.

Douglas made his feature film acting debut in the Artie Knapp science fiction comedy film Pluto's Plight.

The 1988 arcade game Final Blow was released as James 'Buster' Douglas Knockout Boxing in 1990 for the Master System and Sega Genesis, which replaced one of the fictional fighters with Douglas. This game is considered as a response to Nintendo's Mike Tyson's Punch-Out!!, especially since Tyson lost to Douglas, which Sega took advantage in order to promote their early "Genesis does what Nintendon't" advertisements – an advertising campaign in which Douglas frequently participated.

In 1995, HBO aired Tyson, a television movie based upon the life of Mike Tyson. Douglas was portrayed by actor Duane Davis.

On February 23, 1990, Douglas made a special appearance as a guest referee on WWF's The Main Event III in a match-up between Hulk Hogan and "Macho King" Randy Savage. Mike Tyson was originally scheduled to be the special guest referee, but this changed following Douglas's knockout title win over Tyson just under two weeks before, on February 11.

Douglas's upset against Tyson is the inspiration for The Killers' song "Tyson vs Douglas" from their Wonderful Wonderful album. Singer songwriter Brandon Flowers used the childhood memory of watching the seemingly invincible Tyson lose, as the motivation for a song that's about "me and my family, and the way I’m perceived by my kids. I don’t want them to see me go down like Tyson".

== Personal life ==
Douglas married Bertha M. Paige on July 2, 1987. Although Douglas filed for divorce from Paige on April 20, 1990, the couple reconciled and as of 2015 are still married, raising four sons about 25 miles (40 km) from his hometown of Columbus, Ohio. Douglas has helped raise money for his hometown, donating $10,000 to the Police Athletic League shortly after his bout with Tyson, and establishing a charitable effort in his own name. As of 2020, Douglas coaches youth boxing at the Thompson Community Center in Columbus. Douglas in 2015 stated that he and Tyson have only met once since their fight, and that Tyson was "still kind of short (with me)".

== Honors ==
Douglas is one of the few non-students to be honored by Ohio State University with the opportunity to dot the "i" during the performance of the Script Ohio by The Ohio State University Marching Band. Douglas was inducted into the Columbus Hall of Fame in 1991, and the Atlantic City Boxing Hall of Fame in 2024.

== Professional boxing record ==
| 45 fights | 37 wins | 6 losses |
|---|---|---|
| By knockout | 25 | 5 |
| By decision | 12 | 1 |
| Draws | 1 | |
| No contests | 1 | |

| No. | Result | Record | Opponent | Type | Round, time | Date | Location | Notes |
|---|---|---|---|---|---|---|---|---|
| 46 | Win | 38–6–1 (1) | Andre Crowder | TKO | 1 (10), 1:11 | Feb 19, 1999 | Memorial Auditorium, Burlington, Iowa, U.S. | |
| 45 | Win | 37–6–1 (1) | Warren Williams | KO | 1 (10), 2:56 | Dec 12, 1998 | Bank of America Centre, Boise, Idaho, U.S. | |
| 44 | Loss | 36–6–1 (1) | Lou Savarese | KO | 1 (12), 2:34 | Jun 25, 1998 | Foxwoods Resort Casino, Ledyard, Connecticut, U.S. | For vacant IBA heavyweight title |
| 43 | Win | 36–5–1 (1) | Quinn Navarre | TKO | 4 (10), 2:25 | Jul 13, 1997 | Grand Casino, Biloxi, Mississippi, U.S. | |
| 42 | Win | 35–5–1 (1) | Louis Monaco | DQ | 1 (10), 3:00 | May 13, 1997 | Grand Casino, Biloxi, Mississippi, U.S. | Monaco disqualified for hitting after the bell |
| 41 | Win | 34–5–1 (1) | Brian Scott | KO | 6 (10), 0:30 | Mar 30, 1997 | Mohegan Sun Arena, Montville, Connecticut, U.S. | |
| 40 | Win | 33–5–1 (1) | Dicky Ryan | UD | 10 | Feb 12, 1997 | The Theater at Madison Square Garden, New York City, New York, U.S. | |
| 39 | Win | 32–5–1 (1) | Rocky Pepeli | UD | 10 | Jan 10, 1997 | Mohegan Sun Arena, Montville, Connecticut, U.S. | |
| 38 | Win | 31–5–1 (1) | Tony LaRosa | RTD | 3 (10), 3:00 | Jun 22, 1996 | Etess Arena, Atlantic City, New Jersey, U.S. | |
| 37 | Loss | 30–5–1 (1) | Evander Holyfield | KO | 3 (12), 1:10 | Oct 25, 1990 | The Mirage, Paradise, Nevada, U.S. | Lost WBA, WBC, and IBF heavyweight titles |
| 36 | Win | 30–4–1 (1) | Mike Tyson | KO | 10 (12), 1:22 | Feb 11, 1990 | Tokyo Dome, Tokyo, Japan | Won WBA, WBC, and IBF heavyweight titles |
| 35 | Win | 29–4–1 (1) | Oliver McCall | UD | 10 | Jul 21, 1989 | Convention Hall, Atlantic City, New Jersey, U.S. | |
| 34 | Win | 28–4–1 (1) | Trevor Berbick | UD | 10 | Feb 25, 1989 | Las Vegas Hilton, Winchester, Nevada, U.S. | |
| 33 | Win | 27–4–1 (1) | Mike Williams | TKO | 7 (10), 2:45 | Jun 27, 1988 | Convention Hall, Atlantic City, New Jersey, U.S. | |
| 32 | Win | 26–4–1 (1) | Jerry Halstead | TKO | 9 (10) | Apr 16, 1988 | Las Vegas Hilton, Winchester, Nevada, U.S. | |
| 31 | Win | 25–4–1 (1) | Percell Davis | RTD | 9 (10) | Feb 24, 1988 | Pioneer Hall, Duluth, Minnesota, U.S. | |
| 30 | Win | 24–4–1 (1) | Donnie Long | KO | 2 (10), 2:18 | Nov 19, 1987 | Downtown Sheraton, Columbus, Ohio, U.S. | |
| 29 | Loss | 23–4–1 (1) | Tony Tucker | TKO | 10 (15), 1:36 | May 30, 1987 | Las Vegas Hilton, Winchester, Nevada, U.S. | For vacant IBF heavyweight title |
| 28 | Win | 23–3–1 (1) | Dee Collier | UD | 10 | Sep 6, 1986 | Las Vegas Hilton, Winchester, Nevada, U.S. | |
| 27 | Win | 22–3–1 (1) | David Jaco | UD | 10 | Apr 19, 1986 | Las Vegas Hilton, Winchester, Nevada, U.S. | |
| 26 | Win | 21–3–1 (1) | Greg Page | UD | 10 | Jan 17, 1986 | Omni Coliseum, Atlanta, Georgia, U.S. | |
| 25 | Loss | 20–3–1 (1) | Jesse Ferguson | MD | 10 | May 9, 1985 | Caesars Boardwalk Regency, Atlantic City, New Jersey, U.S. | |
| 24 | Win | 20–2–1 (1) | Dion Simpson | KO | 1 (8), 3:01 | Mar 27, 1985 | Steel Pier, Atlantic City, New Jersey, U.S. | |
| 23 | Win | 19–2–1 (1) | Randall Cobb | MD | 10 | Nov 9, 1984 | Riviera, Winchester, Nevada, U.S. | |
| 22 | NC | 18–2–1 (1) | David Starkey | NC | 1 (10) | Jul 9, 1984 | East Dallas Club, Columbus, Ohio, U.S. | NC after both boxers' corners stormed the ring |
| 21 | Loss | 18–2–1 | Mike White | TKO | 9 (10) | Dec 17, 1983 | Sands Hotel and Casino, Paradise, Nevada, U.S. | |
| 20 | Win | 18–1–1 | Eugene Cato | TKO | 1 (8) | Sep 28, 1983 | Sands Hotel and Casino, Paradise, Nevada, U.S. | |
| 19 | Win | 17–1–1 | Dave Johnson | MD | 10 | Jul 5, 1983 | Sands Hotel and Casino, Paradise, Nevada, U.S. | |
| 18 | Win | 16–1–1 | Henry Porter | TKO | 2 (8), 1:36 | Apr 28, 1983 | Sands Hotel and Casino, Paradise, Nevada, U.S. | |
| 17 | Win | 15–1–1 | Jesse Clark | KO | 2 (8) | Apr 16, 1983 | Catholic Central Highschool, Muskegon, Michigan, U.S. | |
| 16 | Win | 14–1–1 | Leroy Diggs | TKO | 7 (10) | Mar 29, 1983 | Tropicana, Atlantic City, New Jersey, U.S. | |
| 15 | Win | 13–1–1 | Jesse Clark | KO | 2 (8) | Mar 9, 1983 | V.I.P. Club, Niles, Ohio, U.S. | |
| 14 | Win | 12–1–1 | Tim Johnson | KO | 1 (8) | Nov 20, 1982 | Infinity Club, Columbus, Ohio, U.S. | |
| 13 | Draw | 11–1–1 | Steffen Tangstad | UD | 8 | Oct 16, 1982 | Bismarck Hotel, Chicago, Illinois, U.S. | |
| 12 | Win | 11–1 | Mel Daniels | TKO | 1 (6) | Apr 24, 1982 | War Memorial Arena, Johnstown, Pennsylvania, U.S. | |
| 11 | Win | 10–1 | Rick Enis | MD | 6 | Apr 8, 1982 | Sherwood Club, Indianapolis, Indiana, U.S. | |
| 10 | Win | 9–1 | Marvin Earle | TKO | 2 (6) | Feb 15, 1982 | Stan & Ollie's Lounge, Kalamazoo, Michigan, U.S. | |
| 9 | Win | 8–1 | Donny Townsend | UD | 6 | Feb 13, 1982 | Central Tech High School, Erie, Pennsylvania, U.S. | |
| 8 | Win | 7–1 | Hubert Adams | KO | 1 (6) | Jan 23, 1982 | Morgan High School, McConnelsville, Ohio, U.S. | |
| 7 | Win | 6–1 | Don Johnson | TKO | 3 (6) | Dec 23, 1981 | Memorial Civic Center, Canton, Ohio, U.S. | |
| 6 | Loss | 5–1 | David Bey | TKO | 2 (4) | Nov 6, 1981 | Civic Arena, Pittsburgh, Pennsylvania, U.S. | |
| 5 | Win | 5–0 | Jesse Clark | KO | 3 (4) | Oct 23, 1981 | Swayne Hall, Toledo, Ohio, U.S. | |
| 4 | Win | 4–0 | Abdul Muhaymin | TKO | 5 (6), 1:56 | Oct 14, 1981 | Tyndall Armory, Indianapolis, Indiana, U.S. | |
| 3 | Win | 3–0 | Mike Rodgers | TKO | 3 (4) | Sep 27, 1981 | Veterans Memorial Auditorium, Columbus, Ohio, U.S. | Professional debut according to some sources |
| 2 | Win | 2–0 | Mike Lear | UD | 4 | Jul 24, 1981 | Mount Vernon Plaza, Columbus, Ohio, U.S. | |
| 1 | Win | 1–0 | Dan O'Malley | TKO | 3 (4) | May 31, 1981 | Mount Vernon Plaza, Columbus, Ohio, U.S. | Listed by some sources as an exhibition |

== Titles in boxing ==
=== Major world titles ===
- WBA heavyweight champion (200+ lbs)
- WBC heavyweight champion (200+ lbs)
- IBF heavyweight champion (200+ lbs)

=== Undisputed titles ===
- Undisputed heavyweight champion

== See also ==
- List of heavyweight boxing champions
- List of undisputed boxing champions

Sporting positions
World boxing titles
| Preceded by Mike Tyson | WBA heavyweight champion February 11, 1990 – October 25, 1990 | Succeeded by Evander Holyfield |
| Preceded by Mike Tyson | WBC heavyweight champion February 11, 1990 – October 25, 1990 | Succeeded by Evander Holyfield |
| Preceded by Mike Tyson | IBF heavyweight champion February 11, 1990 – October 25, 1990 | Succeeded by Evander Holyfield |
| Preceded by Mike Tyson | Undisputed heavyweight champion February 11, 1990 – October 25, 1990 | Succeeded by Evander Holyfield |
Awards
| Previous: René Jacquot; UD12 Donald Curry | The Ring Upset of the Year; KO10 Mike Tyson; 1990 | Next: Azumah Nelson; KO8 Jeff Fenech |
