= Tyson (1995 film) =

- Promotional poster
- Genre: Biographical drama; Sports drama
- Based on: Fire and Fear: The Inside Story of Mike Tyson by José Torres
- Written by: Robert Johnson
- Directed by: Uli Edel
- Starring: George C. Scott; Paul Winfield; Michael Jai White
- Music by: Stewart Copeland
- Country of origin: United States
- Original language: English

Production
- Executive producers: Ross Greenburg; Edgar J. Scherick
- Producer: David Blocker
- Cinematography: Jack Conroy
- Editor: Seth Flaum
- Running time: 104 minutes
- Production company: HBO Pictures

Original release
- Network: HBO
- Release: April 29, 1995

Tyson is a 1995 American biographical drama television film based on the life of American heavyweight boxer Iron Mike Tyson. Directed by Uli Edel and written by Robert Johnson, it stars Michael Jai White as Tyson alongside George C. Scott as Cus D'Amato and Paul Winfield as Don King. The film is an adaptation of the 1989 biography Fire and Fear: The Inside Story of Iron Mike Tyson by José Torres, a former boxer and former chairman of the New York State Athletic Commission, and depicts events from Tyson's troubled childhood in Brooklyn through his conviction in 1992 for the rape of beauty pageant contestant Desiree Washington. The film first aired on HBO on April 29, 1995.

== Plot ==
Mike Tyson grows up a troubled youth, who aspires to become a professional boxer. Manager and trainer Cus D'Amato begins turning the young Tyson into an undefeated fighter. However, Tyson becomes a difficult pupil who is often exposed and slacks off during his training. D'Amato surrounds Tyson with boxing managers Jimmy Jacobs, Bill Cayton and trainer Kevin Rooney to help rebuild Tyson's life. D'Amato tells Tyson that as long as he keeps good people nearby, they can keep him out of trouble.

Tyson quickly rises through the ranks but becomes upset when D'Amato's health deteriorates and he dies. Jacobs then takes over as Tyson's manager. In 1986, Tyson takes part in the match against Trevor Berbick in Las Vegas at the World Boxing Council heavyweight championship. At twenty years of age, Tyson wins, and becomes the youngest champion in boxing history. In 1987, the match against Tony Tucker takes place, in which Tyson wins and retains his title.

Tyson marries his pregnant girlfriend, actress Robin Givens. The event is followed by the sad news of Jacobs' death due to leukemia. Cayton takes on the job of managing Tyson. Don King seeks Tyson with an offer to manage his career. Tyson declines but decides to hire King as his new promoter instead. A battle of words flies between King, Robin and Cayton in the media as they accuse each other of swindling Tyson. When Robin suffers a miscarriage, Tyson slacks off during his training. Rooney, in a fit of frustration, tells him that Robin was never pregnant to begin with. Tyson in response knocks out two of his training partners.

In 1988, the match against Michael Spinks takes place. Before the match, Cayton learns that he has been fired. Tyson defeats Spinks and everyone cheers on but Cayton and Rooney are not on the same page. During a television interview with Barbara Walters, Robin unintentionally embarrasses Tyson with his mental health issues. Meanwhile, police arrive at Robin's home where Tyson is throwing a temper tantrum. Robin tells the press that Tyson has become an emotionally abusive husband. She moves out and files for divorce.

In Tokyo, on February 11, 1990, the match against Buster Douglas takes place. Tyson fights hard, but the match ends with Buster Douglas victorious over Tyson by knockout. In 1991, Tyson is brought to trial for raping beauty pageant contestant Desiree Washington. He is convicted of rape and criminally deviant conduct and sentenced to six years in prison, which is served at the Indiana Youth Center. Rooney files a suit against Tyson for civil damages. Upon release in 1995, Tyson announces that he will attempt a comeback. King remains his promoter but is scheduled to stand trial for insurance fraud.

== Cast ==
- George C. Scott as Constantine "Cus" D'Amato
- Paul Winfield as Don King
- Michael Jai White as Mike "Iron Mike" Tyson
  - Regal Hanley as Young Mike Tyson
- James Sikking as Bill Cayton
- Malcolm-Jamal Warner as Rory Holloway
- Tony Lo Bianco as Jimmy Jacobs
- Clark Gregg as Kevin Rooney
- Holt McCallany as Teddy Atlas
- Kristen Wilson as Robin Givens
- Sheila Wills as Ruth Roper
- Lilyan Chauvin as Camille Ewald
- Rebekah Johnson as Desiree Washington
- George Murdock as Matt Baranski
- Jimmy Bridges as Carl King
- Richard Callender as Johnny Gill
- Dayton Callie as Sportswriter
- Reg E. Cathey as Michael Winston
- June Chandler as Barbara Walters
- Chuck Hull as Himself
- Michael Jace as Mitch Green
- Larry Merchant as Himself
- Rashaan Nall as Dog
- Miguel Perez as Reporter
- Ray Reinhardt as Marvin Mitchelson
- Jacqueline Schultz as Lorraine Jacobs
- Peter Spellos as Sportswriter
- Scott Waara as Officer Doyle
- Duane Davis as James "Buster" Douglas
- DeAndre Whitten as Michael Spinks
- Charles Norman as Tony Tucker
- Jeff Stephenson as Trevor Berbick
- Jim Nickerson as Bobby Stewart
- Mills Lane as Himself
- Lou Filippo as Referee
- Gene LeBell as Referee

== Awards and nominations ==
Tyson was nominated for the 1996 NAACP Image Award for Outstanding Television Movie, Mini-Series or Dramatic Special. The award went to another HBO film, The Tuskegee Airmen.

== Reception ==
The movie received mixed reviews from critics.

== Video releases ==
Tyson was released on VHS on January 13, 1998. A DVD release followed years later, on June 16, 2008.

== See also ==
- List of boxing films
