= Non-compromised Pendulum =

2017 book by Oleg Maltsev and Tom Patti about the peek-a-boo boxing style

- First edition (Russian)
- Author: Oleg Maltsev, Tom Patti
- Language: English, Russian
- Subject: Boxing
- Publication date: 20 November 2017
- English publication date: 29 August 2018
- ISBN: 978-617-7696-46-8
- Website: noncompromisedpendulum.com

Non-compromised Pendulum (Russian: Бескомпромиссный маятник) is a book about the fight system of the boxing coach Cus D'Amato, known as a peek-a-boo. The book, written by the Ukrainian scientist and martial arts researcher Oleg Maltsev and D'Amato's mentee Tom Patti, was published in the English language in 2018, which can be accessed by anybody free of charge, to preserve the legacy of Cus Damato.

== The history of writing ==
The book Non-compromised Pendulum was preceded by the international project Science of Victory, dedicated to the memory of Cus D'Amato, coach of the three world boxing champions Jose Torres, Floyd Patterson and Mike Tyson. The marathon passed from 26 October 2017 to 4 November 2017. The project was attended by boxing champions, trainers, sports journalists, sports psychologists and martial arts experts from around the world who shared their thoughts on Casa D'Amato and his role in the history of professional boxing.

The idea of the project and the writing of the book belongs to the Ukrainian scientist, candidate of psychological sciences, Oleg Maltsev, who studied the training system of D'Amato and the style of boxing he has created for more than 20 years. In order to test the results of the research and get information about the system, he began collaborating with D'Amato's student Tom Patti. In 2017 in New York, the authors completed the study and writing of the book.

== Reception ==
The book is available for free in Russian and English languages. Overall Non-compromised Pendulum received favourable reviews from boxing scholars who knew D'Amato himself and/or researched his boxing style.

A sports psychologist, former boxer and coach Alexander Balykin wrote in his review that the book should be read not only by coaches, but also by the athletes regardless of the sport they are doing. According to Alexander Balykin, the system of Cus D'Amato will be always relevant in all sports. He also notes the philosophical and psychological component in D'Amato's system. Although, he notes that by reading the "Non-compromised Pendulum" one will not become capable of using D'Amato's system. For a deeper understanding of Cus’ methodology in practice it is necessary to train with a professional coach and study additional methodological manuals.

Dr. Antonio Graceffo compares the Non-compromised Pendulum with the Book of Five Rings by Miyamoto Musashi and with the treatise Art of War by Sun Tzu. Graceffo noted the concept "2 + 3 = 5" and its practical aspects in and out of the ring. The number "2" of the equation means a duel between a coach and student, by means of which the coach gains authority in the eyes of his mentee. Graceffo emphasized that while Cus D’Amato was able to subordinate and "defeat" Mike Tyson, he did not damage his personality. In his words the book is meant to develop a non-compromised approach and mind-set.

NY Fights journalist John Gatling notes that the view of Non-compromised Pendulum is somewhere in the middle between what Muhammed Ali thought of Cus – the devil and what Mike Tyson of him – the God. John considers the book to be an elaborate psychological course into Cus D’Amato's approach in training and developing a lifestyle of a true champion.

Boxing historian, founder of Boxing Hall of Fame, Inc (Las Vegas, Nevada) Steve Lott reviewed the book stating that the piece is something which was never done in the history of boxing. In his words, Cus would be impressed that the author understood that 80% of boxing was mental and emotional, with the physical being a small part. However at same time Steve notes that the book is way above the level of average boxing readers and the concepts might be too advanced to comprehend.

Martin González a trainer at United States Boxing Association praised the analysis of the technical elements of style and an approach in studying mental processes and psychology. According to Martin Gonzalez, he himself used the style of Cus D'Amato in training boxing fighters.

The president of the National League of Professional Boxing of Ukraine, Mikhail Zavyalov, generally praised the book. However, he is ready to argue with a fragment of the book where it is said that without the instinct of the killer a boxer will not become king in the ring. In contrast, he refers to the current boxers Vasily Lomachenko and Oleksandr Usyk, who in his opinion, do not possess the killer instinct.

The journalist of The Ring Lee Groves, examining the structure of the book, also noted its depth.

The book is divided into 11 chapters, and while the text is only 131 pages long, it is a deep, absorbing and challenging read.

— LEE GROVES

Sports Illustrated review by Kaelen Jones states that Non-compromised Pendulum serves as a short and concise testament of authors’ commitment to adequately portray Cus D’Amato. The review includes authors’ quotes and striking ideas of certain chapters of the book, saying that it is an unconventional read with myriad lessons throughout it. It also points out the fact while D’Amato is remembered as one of the most influential boxing trainers, his doctrines were taught in secret and mostly unknown.

== Content ==
The book comprehensively describes D'Amato's system based on two decades long scientific research. Authors claim that D'Amato's system is applicable in and out of the ring. Different chapters of the book explain the genius of D'Amato and his psychological, philosophical and methodological approach of bringing up a champion. In the frameworks of the research, the scientific expedition was held in the homeland of D'Amato, Southern Italy.

== See also ==
- Maxie Rosenbloom
