= Peek-a-boo (boxing style) =

Boxing style

Peek-a-boo is a boxing style which received its common name for the defensive hand position, which are normally placed in front of the face, like in the baby's game of the same name. The technique is thought to offer extra protection to the face while making it easier to jab the opponent's face. The fighter holds their gloves close to their cheeks and pulls their arms tight against their torso. A major proponent of the style was trainer Cus D'Amato, who did not use the term peek-a-boo and instead referred to it as a "tight defense." The style was criticized by some because it was believed that an efficient attack could not be launched from it.

== Concept ==
Peek-a-boo's key principles are built upon the "Bad intentions" concept, which emphasize the D'Amato philosophy. The general idea is that the Peek-a-boo practitioners are counterpunchers, who contrary to accustomed ways of counterpunching perceived as constantly backing-up and jabbing from the safe distance, move forward and do it with a lot of aggressiveness by constantly charging at the opponent, provoking him into throwing punches to counter, and subsequently into making mistakes to capitalize on, by creating openings and dominant angles of attack.

== Hands and upper-body movement ==
Peek-a-boo boxing utilizes relaxed hands with the forearms in front of the face and the fist at nose-eye level. Other unique features include side-to-side head movements, bobbing, weaving and blind siding the opponent.

A fighter using the peek-a-boo style is drilled with the stationary dummy and on the bag until the fighter is able to punch by rapid combinations with what D'Amato called "bad intentions". The style allows swift neck movements as well as quick duckings and bad returning damage, usually by rising uppercuts or even rising hooks. The power in punch came from weight shifting.

== Footwork ==
Peek-a-boo footwork is not that frequently noted by observers, which usually focus on the upper-body movement and striking, but it sets the base for both the effective upper-body movement and punching with leverage. The footwork is aimed to close the distance, crowd the opponent, cut off his escape routes, negate his reach advantage, and create dominant angles for attack simultaneously. To be able to slip and counter the opponent's punches, the practitioner should be able to do it from a neutral or near-neutral stance, with his pelvis squared-up in parallel against the opponent's pelvis, for it creates more room for the lateral upper-body movement side-to-side with more amplitude, and places conventional boxers in an unfamiliar position relatively to the Peek-a-boo practitioners. Peek-a-boo pelvic movement also sets the momentum for uppercuts. As the Peek-a-boo footwork requires shifting and occasional stance-switching, ambidextrous boxers prevail over both orthodox and southpaws, gaining the ultimate advantage by constantly and deliberately changing their stance.

== Punches by the numbers ==
Fighters would pick combinations from a series of numbered punches:

1. Left hook
2. Right cross/hook
3. Left uppercut
4. Right uppercut
5. Left hook to the body
6. Right hand to the body
7. Jab to the head
8. Jab to the body

Instructing a fighter in the corner (and shouting from ringside) was made simpler by shouting numbered combinations. Probably the most famous example was Mike Tyson's devastating 6-4.

== Known practitioners ==
In alphabetical order (with their respective trainees):

- Teddy Atlas was trained as a fighter and had shown considerable initial success winning every subsequent fight by knockout, but after his spinal illness was discovered, D'Amato tutored him to be a trainer (Atlas actually became a trainer and cornerman for both Kevin Rooney and Mike Tyson in 1979–1982, while aging D'Amato relieved of his everyday training duties to be a mentor and resolve managerial issues.)
  - Donny Lalonde
  - Shannon Briggs
  - Michael Moorer
  - Michael Grant
  - Alexander Povetkin
  - Timothy Bradley
  - Oleksandr Gvozdyk
- Joey Hadley, 1973 top U.S. middleweight amateur boxer.
- Buster Mathis, trained for several years at the start of his professional career by Cus D'Amato.
- Floyd Patterson, the first fighter to use the peek-a-boo effectively, becoming Olympic gold medalist and two-time Heavyweight Champion of the world. Also, the first man to ever win back the heavyweight championship.
  - Tracy Harris Patterson
- Kevin Rooney, Mike Tyson's former trainer, is an expert in peek-a-boo boxing, having once been a Golden Gloves champion.
  - Omar Sheika
  - Vinny Paz
- José Torres, who was trained and managed by D'Amato, won the silver medal in the 1956 Melbourne Summer Olympics, and won the Light Heavyweight world title by defeating Willie Pastrano.
- Mike Tyson, whose use of the style is probably the most famous example, was notorious for his punching ability and defense.
