= Marvin Hagler vs. Sugar Ray Leonard =

Boxing match

The Super Fight
- Date: April 6, 1987
- Venue: Caesars Palace, Paradise, Nevada, U.S.
- Title(s) on the line: WBC and The Ring middleweight titles

Tale of the tape
Boxer	Marvin Hagler	Ray Leonard
Nickname	Marvelous	Sugar
Hometown	Brockton, Massachusetts, U.S.	Palmer Park, Maryland, U.S.
Purse	$12,000,000	$11,000,000
Pre-fight record	62–2–2 (52 KO)	33–1 (24 KO)
Age	32 years, 10 months	30 years, 10 months
Height	5 ft 10 in (178 cm)	5 ft 10 in (178 cm)
Weight	159 lb (72 kg)	158 lb (72 kg)
Style	Southpaw	Orthodox
Recognition	WBC, IBF and The Ring; Middleweight Champion	2-division world champion

Result
- Leonard wins via 12-round split decision (118–110, 115–113, 113–115)

Marvin Hagler vs. Sugar Ray Leonard, billed as The Super Fight, was a professional boxing match contested on April 6, 1987 for the WBC and The Ring magazine middleweight titles. Leonard won by a controversial split decision and ultimately this became Hagler's final fight in his career.

== Background ==
In the late summer of 1986, negotiations began for a proposed super fight between long-reigning undisputed middleweight champion Marvelous Marvin Hagler and former two-weight champion Sugar Ray Leonard. Leonard had fought only once since his first professional retirement in 1982, defeating Kevin Howard in 1984, retiring again immediately following the fight after being dissatisfied with his performance. In March 1986, Hagler defeated John Mugabi via 11th round knockout, though Mugabi gave Hagler a tough fight and swelled his right eye. Leonard was in attendance of the Hagler–Mugabi fight and after seeing Hagler having slower speed than usual against Mugabi, thought he could beat Hagler, and in May 1986, Leonard announced that he would come out of retirement only to fight Hagler.

Hagler was initially reluctant to fight Leonard, announcing in July 1986 that a fight with Leonard wouldn't happen as he was "seriously thinking of retirement." By the following month, Hagler had a change of heart and agreed to face Leonard in 1987. Hagler was guaranteed $12 million plus a percentage of the revenue, while Leonard was guaranteed $11 million plus 50 percent of the closed circuit television rights in Maryland and the District of Columbia. Hagler ended up with around $20 million and Leonard with around $12 million.

The Leonard camp initially proposed a ten round, non-title fight. Leonard insisted on three conditions for the fight that would be crucial to his strategy; first the ring was to be 22x22ft instead of a smaller ring; second the gloves were to be 10 ounces rather than 8 ounces; and third the fight was to be over 12 rounds instead of the 15 rounds favoured by Hagler. Mike Trainer, Leonard's lawyer and advisor, stated that it was "12 rounds or no fight." In return for accepting these conditions, Hagler was offered a large share of the purse. Hagler had previously held the middleweight title belts of all three major sanctioning bodies, the WBA, WBC and IBF. While the WBC agreed to sanction the bout against Leonard, the WBA stripped Hagler of their title after he chose to face Leonard instead of their mandatory challenger Herol Graham. The IBF, while keeping Hagler as their champion, refused to sanction the fight against Leonard, and said that the IBF middleweight title would be declared vacant if Hagler lost to Leonard.

In a poll of sportswriters before the fight, 46 out of 50 picked Hagler to win. Leonard was expected to struggle because of his long lay-off and having never had a fight at middleweight before. Unknown to Hagler or the media at the time, in preparation for the fight Leonard had secretly engaged in four warm-up bouts in private with "top-20-type opponents, against whom he had gone 4–0 with two KOs".

== The fight ==
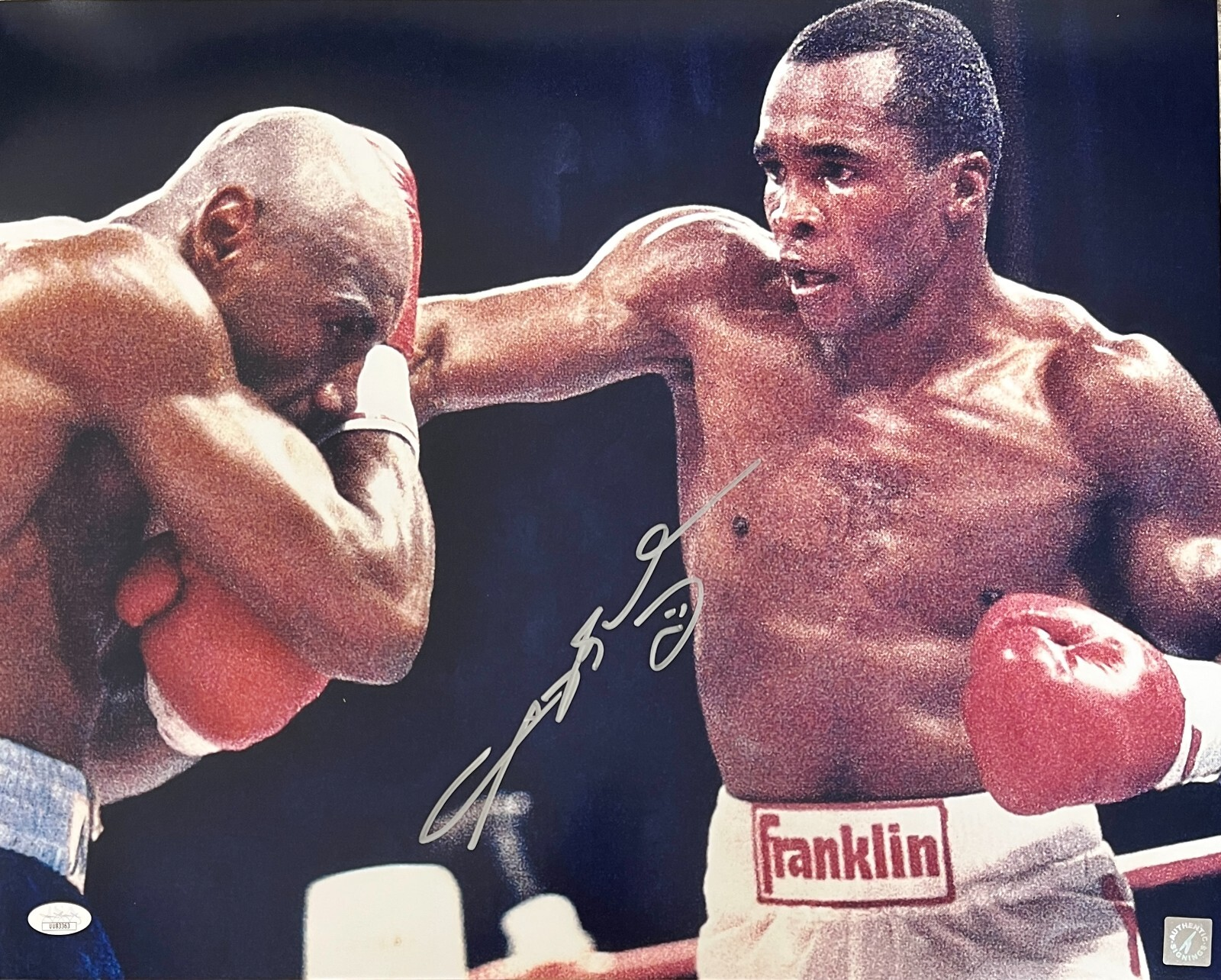

In what would go down to be among the most controversial fights in boxing history, Leonard would ultimately earn a split decision victory. Hagler started the fight abandoning his usual southpaw stance in favor of an orthodox stance, which would prove costly as he lost the first two rounds on all three judges' scorecards. By round three, Hagler switched to starting rounds in his normal southpaw stance. Hagler would spend most of the fight as the aggressor, while Leonard would pepper Hagler with combinations before retreating away. During the last 30 seconds of each round, Leonard would attack Hagler with a flurry of punches in an effort to "steal" the rounds on the scorecards. Overall, Leonard landed 306 of his 629 thrown punches (49%) compared to Hagler's 291 out of 792 (37%). Hagler landed more jabs than Leonard, but neither boxer came close to knocking the other man out. Hagler later complained about Leonard not standing and fighting him face-to-face and stated that he didn't dominate the fight enough to take it from a defending champion; Leonard's supporters dismissed the notion that a defending champion has a lesser burden of performance, stating that the only advantage they have is that winning half of the rounds will retain their title, and Hagler failed to do that.

Two judges had the fight close, seven rounds to five each way, with judge Lou Filippo scoring the fight 115–113 for Hagler, and judge Dave Moretti scoring the fight 115–113 for Leonard. The third judge, JoJo Guerra, had Leonard winning by a lopsided score of 118–110, having had Leonard winning 10 rounds and Hagler winning only 2 rounds. Guerra's scorecard was widely derided in the media following the bout. Guerra later acknowledged that he made a mistake and should have scored two more rounds for Hagler, but didn't state that Hagler should have won the fight. Ironically, the judge who was removed from the three-man panel at Hagler's request in place of Guerra (he was British and Hagler's camp felt he would have inherent bias because he had been present when Hagler won a 1980 fight in London against a popular British boxer named Alan Minter), said later that he did his own scorecard at home as a viewer and would have given the fight by a 2-point margin to Hagler.

=== Scorecards ===
==== Official scorecards ====
Nevada Athletic Commission Official score card
Title: The Super Fight					Referee: Richard Steele					Supervisor: Antonio Sciarra				
Date: April 6, 1987					Venue: Caesars Palace					Promoter: Bob Arum				
Marvin Hagler		vs.	Ray Leonard		Marvin Hagler		vs.	Ray Leonard		Marvin Hagler		vs.	Ray Leonard	
RS	TS	Rd	TS	RS	RS	TS	Rd	TS	RS	RS	TS	Rd	TS	RS
9		1		10	9		1		10	9		1		10
9	18	2	20	10	9	18	2	20	10	9	18	2	20	10
10	28	3	29	9	9	27	3	30	10	9	27	3	30	10
10	38	4	38	9	9	36	4	40	10	9	36	4	40	10
10	48	5	47	9	10	46	5	49	9	10	46	5	49	9
9	57	6	57	10	9	55	6	59	10	9	55	6	59	10
10	67	7	66	9	9	64	7	69	10	10	65	7	68	9
10	77	8	75	9	9	73	8	79	10	10	75	8	77	9
10	87	9	84	9	9	82	9	89	10	10	85	9	86	9
10	97	10	93	9	9	91	10	99	10	9	94	10	96	10
9	106	11	103	10	9	100	11	109	10	9	103	11	106	10
9	115	12	113	10	10	110	12	118	9	10	113	12	115	9
FINAL SCORE	115	–	113	FINAL SCORE	FINAL SCORE	110	–	118	FINAL SCORE	FINAL SCORE	113	–	115	FINAL SCORE
Won			Lost		Lost			Won		Lost			Won	
Judge: Lou Filippo					Judge: Jose Juan Guerra					Judge: Dave Moretti				
Suspensions: None					Point deductions: None					Decision: Split Decision				

==== Press row scorecards ====
The scorecards from the ringside press and broadcast media attest to the polarizing views and opinions of the fight:

- ABC (Howard Cosell): 117–112 Leonard
- Bob Arum: 7–5 Hagler
- Associated Press: 117–112 Hagler
- Baltimore Sun: 7–5 Leonard (115–113 Leonard)
- Boston Globe (Ron Borges): 115–113 Hagler
- Boston Globe (Steve Marantz): 117–111 Leonard
- Boston Herald: 116–113 Leonard
- CBS (Gil Clancy): 115–113 Leonard
- CBS (Tim Ryan): 115–114 Hagler
- Chicago Sun-Times: 115–114 Hagler
- Chicago Tribune (1 - Bob Verdi): 115–113 Hagler
- Chicago Tribune (2 - Bernie Lincicome): 115–113 Hagler
- Chicago Tribune (3 - Sam Smith): 115–113 Hagler
- ESPN (Al Bernstein): 115–113 Hagler
- ESPN (Dave Bontempo): 114–114
- HBO (Harold Lederman): 115–113 Leonard
- HBO (Larry Merchant): 114–114
- Houston Chronicle: 115–114 Leonard
- Newark Star-Ledger (Jerry Izenberg): 115–113 Hagler
- KO Magazine: 118–111 Leonard
- Miami Herald: 116–112 Hagler
- Miami News: 116–112 Hagler
- Los Angeles Times: 117–111 Leonard
- Newsday: 115–114 Hagler
- New York Daily News (1): 117–111 Leonard
- New York Daily News (2 - Michael Katz): 117–112 Leonard
- New York Post (1): 114–114
- New York Post (2 - Jerry Lisker): 115–113 Hagler
- New York Times (Dave Anderson): 114–114
- Oakland Tribune: 117–112 Leonard
- Philadelphia Daily News (1): 116–112 Leonard
- Philadelphia Daily News (2): 115–113 Hagler
- Ring Magazine (Nigel Collins): 115–113 Leonard
- Ring Magazine (Phill Marder): 114–114
- San Jose Mercury-News: 116–115 Hagler
- Seattle Times: 115–113 Hagler
- Sports Illustrated (Hugh McIlvanney): 116–112 Hagler
- Sports Illustrated (William Nack): 116–114 Leonard
- Sports Illustrated (Pat Putnam): 115–113 Hagler
- United Press International: 116–112 Leonard
- USA Today: 115–113 Leonard
- Washington Post: 114–114

The cumulative total of these press and media scorecards is: Hagler 19, Leonard 17, draw 6.

== Aftermath ==
Hagler requested a rematch but Leonard chose to retire again (the third of five high-profile retirements announced by Leonard during his professional boxing career), having said he would do so beforehand. In June 1988, 14 months after their fight, Hagler announced his retirement from boxing, declaring that he was "tired of waiting" for Leonard to grant him a rematch. Just a month after Hagler's retirement, Leonard announced another boxing comeback to fight against WBC light-heavyweight champion Donny Lalonde at the 168lbs super-middleweight limit. In 1990, Leonard finally offered Hagler a rematch which reportedly would have earned him $15m, but he declined. By then, Hagler had settled down into a new life as an actor in Italy and was now uninterested in his past boxing life. Hagler said "A while ago, yeah, I wanted him so bad, but I'm over that." At the 1994 Consumer Electronics Show Hagler and Leonard had a mock rematch by playing against each other in the video game Boxing Legends of the Ring, and claimed that an actual rematch was being planned.

This would also be Leonard's last fight with long-time trainer and cornerman Angelo Dundee, who had worked with Leonard his entire professional career. Dundee felt insulted that he was only paid $150,000 (1.25%) from Leonard's $12 million purse and declined to be in Leonard's corner for his next fight against Donny Lalonde unless he had a contract, which was refused.

== Fight card ==
Confirmed bouts:

Weight Class	Weight		vs.		Method	Round	Notes
Middleweight	160 lb.	Ray Leonard	def.	Marvin Hagler (c)	SD	12/12	^{Note 1}
Middleweight	160 lb.	Juan Roldán	def.	James Kinchen	TKO	9/10
Light middleweight	154 lb.	Lupe Aquino	def.	Davey Moore	TKO	5/10
Light welterweight	140 lb.	Anthony Jones	vs.	Frankie Davies	D	8/8
Light welterweight	140 lb.	Micky Ward	def.	Kelly Koble	TKO	4/8

^Note 1 For WBC, The Ring and lineal middleweight titles

== Broadcasting ==
Country	Broadcaster
Philippines	PTV 4
United Kingdom	ITV
United States	HBO

Preceded by vs. John Mugabi	Marvin Hagler's bouts 7 April 1987	Retired
Preceded by vs. Kevin Howard	Sugar Ray Leonard's bouts 7 April 1987	Succeeded by vs. Donny Lalonde
Awards
Preceded by Barry McGuigan vs. Steve Cruz	The Ring Fight of the Year; 1987	Succeeded by Rocky Lockridge vs. Tony Lopez
Preceded by Donald Curry vs. Lloyd Honeyghan	The Ring Upset of the Year; 1987	Succeeded by Thomas Hearns vs. Iran Barkley
