= Terry Ray (boxer) =

American boxer

Personal information
- Nickname: Stingray
- Nationality: American
- Born: April 10, 1963 (age 63) Terre Haute, Indiana, U.S.
- Height: 6 ft 1 in (185 cm)
- Weight: Cruiserweight

Boxing career
- Reach: 73 in (185 cm)
- Stance: Orthodox

Boxing record
- Total fights: 50
- Wins: 41
- Win by KO: 25
- Losses: 9

Terry Ray (born April 10, 1963) is an American former professional boxer who competed from 1986 to 2001. He held the WBF cruiserweight title from 1999 to 2000 and challenged once for the WBA cruiserweight title in 1998. As an amateur, he defeated 95 of 104 opponents, winning several state and national championships, and earning himself a spot on Team USA to compete against Scandinavia

During his professional career, Ray was trained by distinguished trainers Kevin Rooney (1991–1992) and Angelo Dundee (1993–1998). Since retiring from boxing in 2001, Ray has remained active in the sport as a trainer to both professional and amateur fighters.

== Early life ==
Terry Ray was born on April 10, 1963, in Terre Haute, Indiana. Ray is the grandson of former five-term mayor of Terre Haute, Ralph Tucker. Ray began boxing in Indiana at a young age to gain an amateur record of 95-9 and going on to win the Indiana Golden Gloves multiple times. In 1985, Ray defeated Melton Bowen in the finals to win the National Police Athletic League Tournament. Also as an amateur after training at the Olympic Training Center in Colorado Springs, Ray earned himself a spot on team USA vs. Scandinavia. Ray is a graduate of Indiana State University.

== Professional career ==
Ray began his professional boxing career in 1986, debuting his first two fights on ESPN. In 1991–1992, Ray trained in Catskill, New York under Kevin Rooney, winning 12 fights on the east coast. From 1993 to 1998, Ray trained with Angelo Dundee in Hollywood, Florida. In 1994, Ray fought on CBS against WBF Champion Kenny Keene. The fight between Keene on October 8 ended in a decision loss for Ray.

In 1997, Ray fought former WBA champion Robert Daniels on USA Tuesday Night Fights withRay losing a split decision. Announcer Sean O'Grady had Ray winning the bout 7–3. In 1998, Ray challenged for the WBA cruiserweight title against Fabrice Tiozzo in Lyon, France. He lost to Tiozzo by first-round knockout. Ray went on to win the WBF title in 1999 and defended it three times before losing it to Bash Ali in Lagos, Nigeria. Ray was inducted into the 2020 class of the Indiana Boxing Hall of Fame.

== Outside of boxing ==
In 2012, Ray was convicted of sexual battery involving a 14-year-old girl, receiving an 18-month suspended prison sentence.

== Professional boxing record ==
50 fights	41 wins	9 losses
By knockout	25	4
By decision	16	5

No.	Result	Record	Opponent	Type	Round, time	Date	Location	Notes
50	Win	41–9	(United States) Brian Yates	TKO	4 (6), 2:28	Feb 27, 2000	(United States) Pepsi Coliseum, Indianapolis, Indiana, U.S.	
49	Loss	40–9	(Nigeria) Bash Ali	TD	7 (12)	Sep 11, 2000	National Stadium, Lagos, Nigeria	For vacant WBF cruiserweight title
48	Win	40–8	(United States) Rod Bensonhaver	UD	12	Jan 29, 2000	(United States) Zorah Shrine Temple, Terre Haute, Indiana, U.S.	Won vacant WBF cruiserweight title
47	Loss	39–8	(Italy) Vincenzo Cantatore	KO	3 (12)	May 15, 1999	Capo d'Orlando, Italy	For WBU super cruiserweight title
46	Win	39–7	(United States) Rod Bensonhaver	TD	9 (12)	Apr 24, 1999	(United States) Zorah Shrine Temple, Terre Haute, Indiana, U.S.	Retained WBF cruiserweight title
45	Win	38–7	(United States) Samson Cohen	KO	2 (12), 2:26	Jan 23, 1999	(United States) Zorah Shrine Temple, Terre Haute, Indiana, U.S.	Won vacant WBF cruiserweight title
44	Win	37–7	(United States) Ken Bentley	DQ	7 (8)	Nov 28, 1998	(United States) Zorah Shrine Temple, Terre Haute, Indiana, U.S.	
43	Loss	36–7	(Denmark) Brian Nielsen	TKO	5 (8)	Sep 18, 1998	Sundbyoster Hallen, Copenhagen, Denmark	
42	Loss	36–6	(France) Fabrice Tiozzo	TKO	1 (12), 1:00	May 2, 1998	Astroballe, Lyon, France	For WBA cruiserweight title
41	Win	36–5	(United States) Tim Knight	UD	8	Dec 13, 1997	(United States) Zorah Shrine Temple, Terre Haute, Indiana, U.S.	
40	Win	35–5	(United States) Paul Garner	TKO	1 (6), 1:40	Sep 25, 1997	(United States) Showboat, East Chicago, Indiana, U.S.	
39	Loss	34–5	(Netherlands) Don Diego Poeder	TKO	10 (12), 2:56	Jun 15, 1997	(United States) Foxwoods Resort, Mashantucket, Connecticut, U.S.	For WBU cruiserweight title
38	Win	34–4	(United States) Bobby Crabtree	TKO	3 (12), 2:46	Mar 2, 1997	(United States) UNO Lakefront Arena, New Orleans, Louisiana, U.S.	
37	Loss	33–4	(United States) Robert Daniels	SD	10	Oct 1, 1996	(United States) War Memorial Auditorium, Fort Lauderdale, Florida, U.S.	
36	Win	33–3	(United States) Duane Smith	TKO	3 (?)	Jul 13, 1996	(United States) Henderson, Kentucky, U.S.	
35	Win	32–3	(United States) Steve Brewer	TKO	2 (?)	Jun 25, 1996	(United States) Little Bit of Texas, Indianapolis, Indiana, U.S.	
34	Win	31–3	(United States) Robert Clevenger	UD	10	Feb 27, 1996	(United States) Pepsi Coliseum, Indianapolis, Indiana, U.S.	
33	Win	30–3	(United States) Lopez McGee	TKO	4 (10)	Feb 10, 1996	(United States) Henderson, Kentucky, U.S.	
32	Win	29–3	(United States) Marc Hans	TKO	2 (6)	Dec 9, 1995	(United States) The MARK of the Quad Cities, Moline, Illinois, U.S.	
31	Loss	28–3	(United States) Kenny Keene	TD	5 (12)	Jul 9, 1995	(United States) Boise, Idaho, U.S.	For WBF cruiserweight title
30	Win	28–2	(United States) Keith Williams	TKO	7 (10)	May 24, 1995	(United States) Terre Haute, Indiana, U.S.	
29	Win	27–2	(United States) Robert Straw	TKO	5 (10)	Feb 28, 1995	(United States) Pepsi Coliseum, Indianapolis, Indiana, U.S.	
28	Win	26–2	(United States) Tim Johnson	TKO	12 (12)	Jan 20, 1995	(United States) Terre Haute, Indiana, U.S.	Retained IBF Great Lakes Regional cruiserweight title
27	Loss	25–2	(United States) Kenny Keene	MD	12	Oct 8, 1994	(United States) Hulman Center, Terre Haute, Indiana, U.S.	For WBF cruiserweight title
26	Win	25–1	(United States) Roy Bedwell	KO	3 (10)	Aug 5, 1994	(United States) Indianapolis, Indiana, U.S.	
25	Win	24–1	(United States) Keven Wyrick	TKO	2 (12)	May 6, 1994	(United States) Terre Haute, Indiana, U.S.	Won vacant IBF Great Lakes Regional cruiserweight title
24	Win	23–1	(United States) Paul Ford	PTS	6	Dec 6, 1993	(United States) Rosemont Horizon, Rosemont, Illinois, U.S.	
23	Win	22–1	(United States) Terrence Wright	TKO	4 (8)	Sep 14, 1993	(United States) Tyndall Armory, Indianapolis, Indiana, U.S.	
22	Win	21–1	(United States) Billy Preston	KO	2 (?)	Jun 25, 1993	(United States) Terre Haute, Indiana, U.S.	
21	Win	20–1	(United States) Carl Albert	TKO	2 (?)	Apr 21, 1993	(United States) Louisville, Kentucky, U.S.	
20	Win	19–1	(United States) Wendell Stafford	TKO	1 (8)	Mar 23, 1993	(United States) Ramada Inn Tropical Pavilion, Evansville, Indiana, U.S.	
19	Win	18–1	(United States) Donnie Penelton	PTS	8	Mar 16, 1993	(United States) Adam's Mark Hotel, Indianapolis, Indiana, U.S.	
18	Win	17–1	(United States) Willie Perry	PTS	8	Jan 5, 1993	(United States) Adam's Mark Hotel, Indianapolis, Indiana, U.S.	
17	Win	16–1	(United States) Randy McGaugh	PTS	8	Nov 24, 1992	(United States) Indianapolis, Indiana, U.S.	
16	Win	15–1	(United States) Roosevelt Williams	SD	8	Sep 25, 1992	(United States) Friar Tuck Inn, Catskill, New York, U.S.	
15	Win	14–1	(United States) Fabian Garcia	MD	6	Aug 20, 1992	(United States) Taj Mahal Hotel and Casino, Atlantic City, New Jersey, U.S.	
14	Win	13–1	(United States) David Robinson	KO	3 (?)	Apr 28, 1992	(United States) Adam's Mark Hotel, Indianapolis, Indiana, U.S.	
13	Win	12–1	(United States) Wade Williams	TKO	1 (?), 1:55	Nov 27, 1991	(United States) Houston Gym, Buffalo, New York, U.S.	
12	Win	11–1	(United States) Calvin Simon	KO	1 (?)	Oct 15, 1991	(United States) Harrah's Trump Plaza Hotel, Atlantic City, New Jersey, U.S.	
11	Win	10–1	(United States) Riddick Baker	TKO	1 (?)	Oct 1, 1991	(United States) Civic Center, Providence, Rhode Island, U.S.	
10	Win	9–1	(United States) Willie Kemp	PTS	4	Aug 9, 1991	(United States) Convention Hall, Atlantic City, New Jersey, U.S.	
9	Win	8–1	(United States) Edwin Newby	TKO	4 (8), 1:34	May 29, 1991	(United States) Buffalo Auditorium, Buffalo, New York, U.S.	
8	Win	7–1	(United States) Derrick Brown	SD	4	Mar 20, 1990	(United States) Hyatt Regency Hotel, Minneapolis, Minnesota, U.S.	
7	Win	6–1	(United States) Donald Johnson	PTS	6	Feb 6, 1990	(United States) Memphis, Tennessee, U.S.	
6	Win	5–1	(United States) Jerry Harris	PTS	4	Sep 26, 1989	(United States) Sherwood Club, Indianapolis, Indiana, U.S.	
5	Loss	4–1	(United States) Mike Peak	UD	8	Jan 13, 1987	(United States) Continental Inn, Lexington, Kentucky, U.S.	
4	Win	4–0	(United States) Gerald Moore	KO	1 (?), 2:34	Dec 13, 1986	(United States) National Guard Armory, Martinsville, Indiana, U.S.	
3	Win	3–0	(United States) John Fornara	TKO	1 (4), 2:25	Oct 31, 1986	(United States) Sands Casino Hotel, Atlantic City, New Jersey, U.S.	
2	Win	2–0	(United States) Leon McCullum	KO	1 (8), 2:42	Sep 20, 1986	(United States) Market Square Garden, Indianapolis, Indiana, U.S.	
1	Win	1–0	(United States) Tim Knight	UD	4	Jun 27, 1986	(United States) Springs Golf & Tennis Resort, French Lick, Indiana, U.S.	
