= Cornerman =

Coach in fighting sports

A cornerman giving instructions

In combat sports, a cornerman, or second, is a coach or trainer assisting a fighter during a bout. The cornerman is forbidden to instruct and must remain outside the combat area during the round. In the break, they are permitted to enter the ring and minister to their fighter.

The cornerman may perform cutman duties such as applying ice or adrenaline to reduce swelling and stop bleeding. The cornerman may also be responsible for throwing in the towel when necessary.

== Notable cornermen ==
- Ray Arcel
- Teddy Atlas
- George Benton
- Ignacio Beristáin
- Chuck Bodak, a boxing cutman and trainer who worked with over 50 World Champions including Muhammad Ali, Rocky Marciano, Tommy Hearns, Julio César Chávez, Evander Holyfield, and Oscar De La Hoya.
- Drew Bundini Brown, an assistant trainer and cornerman of Muhammad Ali.
- Gil Clancy
- Cus D'Amato
- Angelo Dundee, an American boxing trainer and cornerman best known for his work with Muhammad Ali (1960–1981).
- Lou Duva
- Eddie Futch
- Robert Garcia
- Buddy McGirt
- Eddie Mustafa Muhammad
- Freddie Roach
- Kevin Rooney
- Abel Sanchez
- Ronnie Shields
- Emanuel Steward
