= Tom Patti =

American businessman and politician

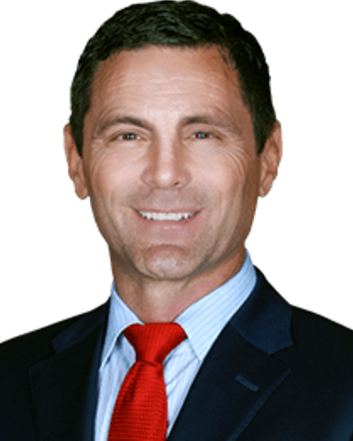

Personal details
- Born: 1963 (age 62–63) New York, U.S.
- Party: Republican
- Education: San Joaquin Delta College
- Occupation: Politician, businessman, former boxer

Tom Patti is an American businessman, politician, and former boxer who is a member of the San Joaquin County Board of Supervisors. As an amateur boxer, Patti was training partners with Mike Tyson. After the death of Cus D'Amato, Patti became Tyson's manager and coach.

He was a Republican candidate in the 2022 election in California's 9th congressional district. He unsuccessfully ran for Mayor of Stockton in the 2024 election, losing in the runoff to victor Christina Fugazi.

== Biography ==
Born in 1963 in New York, Patti moved to Stockton, California. After graduating from high school, he attended Delta College where in 2015 he became a member of the Delta College Foundation board, a non-profit organization with the purpose of creating opportunities for local students to get an expanded education.

Beginning in 1982, Patti, along with Mike Tyson, was mentored by boxing manager-trainer Cus D'Amato. In 2001, Patti returned to California.

On November 8, 2016, Patti became the County Supervisor of District 3 in San Joaquin County, where he has been a proponent for solving homelessness, fighting crime, and lowering taxes.

Patti is a member of the Child Abuse Prevention Council.

In 2017, Patti, together with Oleg Maltsev, wrote the book Non-compromised Pendulum about the style of Cus D'Amato. Patti said the book was a tribute to the memory of D'Amato.

== Political candidacies ==
In 2022, Patti entered the race for U.S. Congress in California's 9th congressional district. He advanced from the top two primary in June 2022 and later lost to incumbent Democrat Josh Harder in the November general election.

In 2024, Patti ran for Mayor of Stockton. He advanced to the runoff, but ultimately lost the election to Christina Fugazi.
