= Kevin Rooney (boxer) =

American boxer & trainer (born 1946)

Kevin Rooney (born May 4, 1956) is an American retired boxer and boxing trainer.

== Amateur boxing career ==
Rooney participated in the 1975 New York Golden Gloves Championship. He defeated Kevin Higgins of West Point in the finals. Rooney trained at the Police Athletic Leagues 120th Precinct in Staten Island, New York.

== Professional boxing career ==
Rooney began professionally boxing in 1979 and acquired a record of twenty-one wins, four losses, and one draw. In his most important fight as a professional, on July 31, 1982, Rooney lost to three division world champion Alexis Argüello, who was making his first fight in the Junior Welterweight division, by a second-round knockout. He also lost to future WBA world Junior Middleweight champion Davey Moore, who avenged an amateur loss to Rooney, by a knockout in seven rounds, on June 21, 1981.

== Career as trainer ==
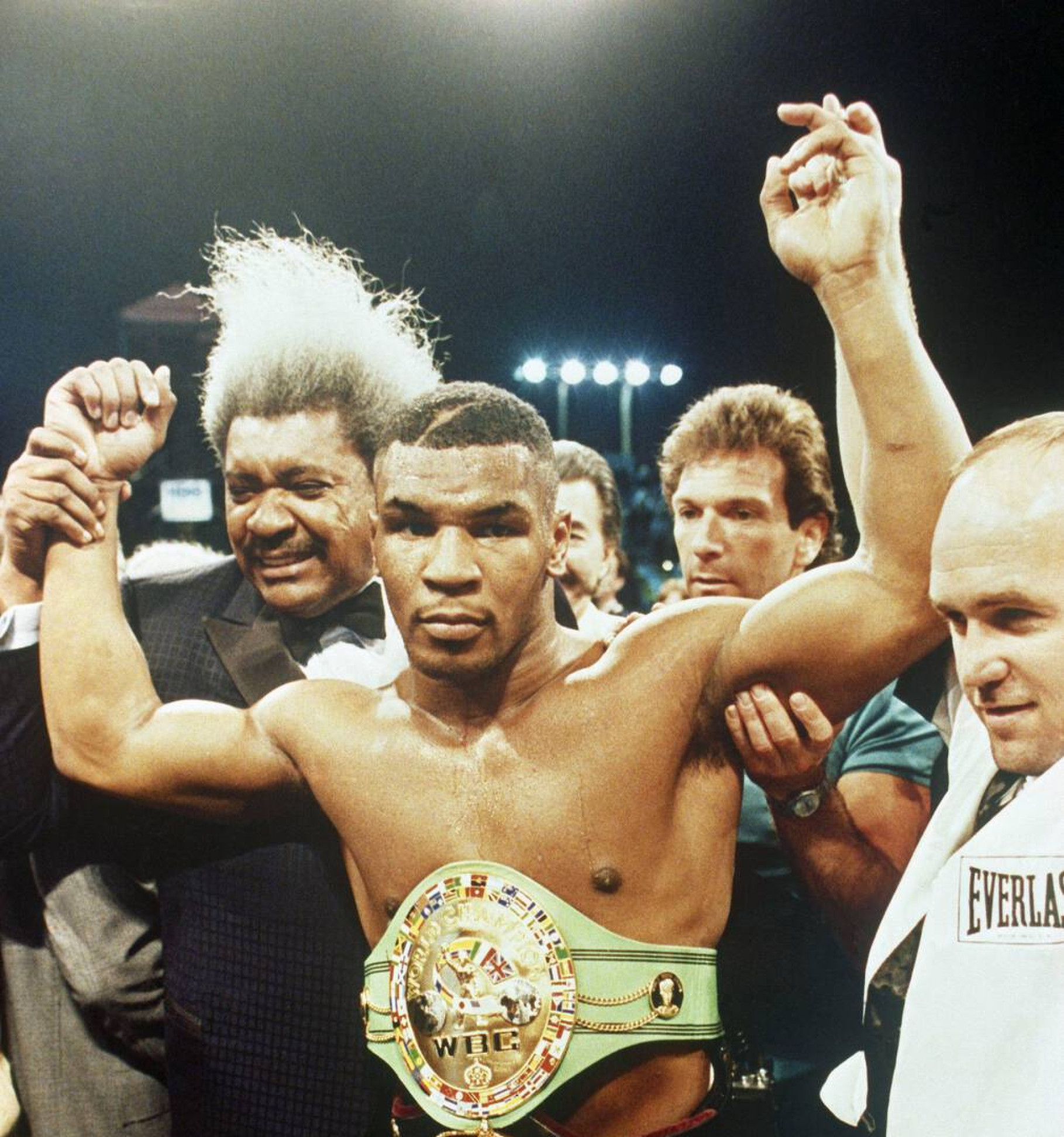
Rooney (right) with Don King and Mike Tyson after Tyson's fight against James Smith

After Teddy Atlas, who was Rooney's cornerman during his boxing days, was relieved of his duties as a trainer of Mike Tyson, manager Cus D'Amato assigned Rooney to be Tyson's trainer. Rooney had been with Tyson since late 1982, when Tyson was 16 years old and just won the National Junior Olympics (having a 9–1 amateur record, with all 9 wins inside the distance). He oversaw the second half of his amateur career (44 fights) and saw the start of his professional career in 1985, following Tyson throughout his world championship days until Tyson's bout with Michael Spinks in 1988. On the insistence of Don King, Tyson fired Rooney along with all other staff that comprised the Team Tyson from the beginning. In the words of sportswriter Jack Newfield, "the day Tyson fired Kevin Rooney there was a cap put on Mike Tyson's development as a fighter, he did not develop any more beyond that day.". Tyson said he had considered hiring Rooney again, but decided not to after Rooney filed a 10 million dollar breach-of contract lawsuit against him in 1989.

During the period when Rooney was Tyson's trainer, Tyson had a professional record of 35 fights, 35 wins (31 wins by KO). Don King had successfully urged Tyson to break all ties with the D'Amato stable. Only his new co-trainer Jay Bright was a disciple of D'Amato, with all other being people from the street. Tyson's mobility skills in the boxing ring, especially his defensive upper-body and head movement, noticeably declined after Rooney's firing, eventually resulting in Tyson suffering his first professional loss in a fight 18 months after Rooney's departure. Boxing analyst Larry Merchant credited Tyson's loss in the Douglas fight with the absence of Kevin Rooney in his corner. The same opinion has been shared by Butch Lewis and Jerry Izenberg.

Rooney was the second-closest trainer to young Mike Tyson, after Cus D'Amato himself, who was also Tyson's adoptive father and is most familiar with D'Amato's famed "Peek-a-Boo" boxing style. Rooney has continued to train fighters, working most notably with Vinny Paz who after being trained by Rooney, won the light middleweight title.

== Later life ==
Kevin Rooney continues to train young boxers in Catskill, New York, at the same gym that he trained in under Cus D'Amato. He was involved on a Comedy Central comedy show, "Punch Line," alongside Bert Sugar, former world middleweight champion Vito Antuofermo and former world middleweight and super middleweight champion Iran Barkley.

Rooney successfully sued Mike Tyson for over $4 million claiming that the latter broke a contract by firing him in 1988.

== In popular culture ==
Rooney was portrayed by Clark Gregg in the 1995 movie Tyson and by Aaron Eckhart in the 2016 movie Bleed for This.

As of 2010, Rooney acted in a consultative capacity on a stage play and screenplay written by Dianna Lefas about the life of Cus D'Amato, KNOCKOUT: The Cus D'Amato Story.
