= Donny Lalonde vs. Sugar Ray Leonard =

Boxing match

For All the Gold
- Date: November 7, 1988
- Venue: Caesars Palace, Paradise, Nevada, U.S.
- Title(s) on the line: WBC light heavyweight and inaugural super middleweight titles

Tale of the tape
Boxer	Donny Lalonde	Ray Leonard
Nickname	The Golden Boy	Sugar
Hometown	Winnipeg, Manitoba, Canada	Palmer Park, Maryland, U.S.
Purse	$5,000,000	$15,000,000
Pre-fight record	31–2 (26 KO)	34–1 (24 KO)
Age	28 years, 7 months	32 years, 5 months
Height	6 ft 1 3/4 in (187 cm)	5 ft 10 1/2 in (179 cm)
Weight	167 lb (76 kg)	165 lb (75 kg)
Style	Orthodox	Orthodox
Recognition	WBC; Light Heavyweight Champion; The Ring; No. 4 Ranked Light Heavyweight	WBC; No. 1 Ranked Super Middleweight; 3-division world champion

Result
- Leonard wins via 9th-round TKO

Donny Lalonde vs. Sugar Ray Leonard, billed as For All the Gold, was a professional boxing match contested on November 7, 1988, for Don Lalonde's WBC light heavyweight title and the inaugural WBC super middleweight title.

== Background ==
In August 1988, a fight between reigning WBC light heavyweight champion Donny Lalonde and 3-division champion "Sugar" Ray Leonard was agreed upon. The fight was a rarity in boxing as two titles from different divisions would be on the line; Lalonde's WBC light heavyweight title and the newly created WBC super middleweight title. As such, the two fighters would fight at the 168-pound super middleweight limit. Leonard was ending his third retirement, which he had entered the previous year after defeating Marvin Hagler by split decision. Leonard and Lalonde agreed to split a $20 million purse with Leonard getting $15 million and Lalonde earning a career-high $5 million. Rather than have an outside promoter, Leonard and Lalonde's teams agreed to co-promote the fight in a joint partnership with the Coors Brewing Company sponsoring the bout. However, there was some controversy prior to the fight when Lalonde refused to wear gear bearing the Coors logo nor participate in promotion for the company. Coors had guaranteed an additional $1 million in each fighters purse and Leonard's lawyer and adviser Mike Trainer threatened to withhold the Coors money from Lalonde, stating "Their money is going to go to a charity of Donny's choice. He's not getting it." He also called the joint-partnership a "nightmare" due in part to problems with Lalonde's manager Dave Wolf.

Prior to the fight, Leonard and his long-time trainer Angelo Dundee, whom had been with Leonard his entire professional career, parted ways. Dundee had taken exception to only receiving $150,000 from the $12 million purse Leonard received for his previous fight against Hagler. Dundee demanded a contract to train Leonard for the Lalonde fight, but Mike Trainer refused, resulting in the split.

== The fight ==
Lalonde controlled the early portion of the fight as a sluggish Leonard had trouble establishing any offense from rounds one through four as Lalonde used his height and reach advantage. In round four Lalonde scored a knockdown after hitting Leonard with a right cross to the head. Leonard was able to continue, but Lalonde quickly went on the attack, throwing punches wildly and opening a cut near Leonard's left eye, though he was able to survive the round. From round five on, Leonard bounced back offensively and the two fighters traded power punches and combinations throughout. In round nine, Lalonde started aggressively knocking Leonard to the mat, but Leonard got up after a 5 count and backed Lalonde into the ropes and landed a flurry of punches ending with a left hook that sent Lalonde down. A clearly dazed Lalonde was able to get back up and continue, but Leonard quickly sent him down again with two right hands followed by a left. Lalonde was unable to get up and Leonard was declared the winner by technical knock out at 2:30 of round nine.

== Aftermath ==
After the fight, Leonard vacated the light heavyweight title, but kept the super middleweight belt.

== Fight card ==
Confirmed bouts:

Weight Class	Weight		vs.		Method	Round	Notes
Super Middleweight	168 lb	Ray Leonard	def.	Donny LaLonde (c)	TKO	9/12	^{Note 1}
Light welterweight	140 lb	Roger Mayweather (c)	def.	Vinny Pazienza	UD	12/12	^{Note 2}
Super Flyweight	115 lb	Gilberto Román (c)	def.	Sugar Baby Rojas	UD	12/12	^{Note 3}
Light heavyweight	175 lb	Kevin Casimier	def	Arthur Hall	MD	8/8
Heavyweight	200+ lb	Ike Padilla	def.	Anthony Hayes	TKO	3/4

^Note 1 For WBC Light Heavyweight and Super Middleweight titles
^Note 2 For WBC Light Welterweight title
^Note 3 For WBC Super Flyweight title

== Broadcasting ==
Country	Broadcaster
Mexico	Televisa
Philippines	GMA Network
United Kingdom	ITV
United States	HBO

Preceded by vs. Leslie Stewart	Donny Lalonde's bouts 7 November 1987	Succeeded by vs. Darryl Fromm
Preceded by vs. Marvin Hagler	Sugar Ray Leonard's bouts 7 November 1987	Succeeded by vs. Thomas Hearns II
