= Joe Hadley =

American professional boxer

Personal information
- Nicknames: Preacher; Joey
- Born: Joseph Hadley Jackson, Tennessee
- Weight: Middleweight

Boxing career
- Stance: Orthodox

Boxing record
- Total fights: 7
- Wins: 7
- Win by KO: 7
- Losses: 0
Medal record
Men's amateur boxing
Representing the United States
North American Championships
Gold medal – first place	1971 Latham	Middleweight

Joseph Hadley is a retired boxer from Jackson, Tennessee, who competed in middleweight division in the 1970s, one of a few trained by Cus D'Amato, and also one of the first documented U.S. mixed martial artists. He was selected a member of the All-American AAU boxing team for 1973, and was named the top middleweight amateur boxer in the nation by the National AAU Boxing Committee in 1973. Hadley drew attention of the press and public by carrying a Bible into the ring, hence his nickname "Preacher," which reflects he actually was a minister. For that reason Hadley refused to pose for a picture with Muhammad Ali, "because Mr. Ali does not live tip to my principles according to the Bible."

== Amateur career ==
Joey Hadley took up boxing in 1966 while still living in Tennessee, stating that he was inspired to box after seeing musician Elvis Presley in the film Kid Galahad. When training with D'Amato, Hadley lived and trained in D'Amato's mansion in Catskill, New York. Hadley won various awards as an amateur boxer, being a six-time Golden Gloves of the Memphis and Mid-South, three-time Southeastern AAU champion, and United States and North American champion. Fighting for the middleweight at the 1971 National Championships, he won seven fights in nine days, all against regional champions, five by knockouts, knocking down every fighter he faced. Hadley also knocked out future world champion Leon Spinks as an amateur in 1973. He used D'Amato's style prominently in these fights.

=== Highlights ===
(gold) Mid-South Golden Gloves, novices (147 lbs), Union University Gymnasium, Jackson, Tennessee, February 1967:

- 1/2: Defeated Joe Graziano by unanimous decision, 5–0
- Finals: Defeated Earl Coggin TKO 1 (1:30)

Tennessee Championships (156 lbs), Fairgrounds Coliseum, Nashville, Tennessee, November–December 1968:

- Defeated Bruce Whitehorn (Hadley was awarded Outstanding Boxer trophy of the tournament)
- Defeated Don Morgan

National Golden Gloves (165 lbs), Las Vegas, Nevada, March 1970:

- 1/8: Defeated Paul Stephens
- 1/4: Lost to Lamont Lovelady by split decision, 2–3

(gold) National Championships (165 lbs), New Orleans, Louisiana, April–May 1971:

- 1/32: Defeated n/a KO
- 1/16: Defeated n/a KO
- 1/8: Defeated Wilbert Crews by decision
- 1/4: Defeated n/a KO
- 1/2: Defeated Vince Fagan (Fagan knocked down)
- Finals: Defeated Zachary Page by unanimous decision, 5–0 (Page knocked down)

(gold) North American Championships (165 lbs), Colonie Coliseum, Latham, New York, May 1971:

- Finals: Defeated Jim French (Canada) by split decision, 3–2 (Hadley cut in the 1st rd)

Pan Am Trials (165 lbs), Chicago, Illinois, May 1971:

- Lost to Jerry Otis

(gold) Mid-South Golden Gloves (165 lbs), February 1972:

(bronze) National Golden Gloves (165 lbs), Minneapolis, Minnesota, March 1972:

- 1/16: Defeated n/a KO
- 1/8: Defeated n/a KO
- 1/4: Defeated Robert McAlpine KO 2 (0:59)
- 1/2: Lost to Marvin Johnson by decision (Hadley cut under both eyes)

Olympic Trials (165 lbs), Fort Collins, Colorado, June 1972:

- Lost to Marvin Johnson

USA–England Duals (165 lbs), Felt Forum, New York City, January 1973:

- Lost to Frank Lucas (England) by decision

USA–USSR Duals (165 lbs), Caesars Palace, Las Vegas, Nevada, January 1973:

- Lost to Vyacheslav Lemeshev (Soviet Union) TKO 2 (Hadley allegedly broke the right thumb in the opening seconds; Hadley knocked down in the 2nd rd; the bout stopped at 2:59)

(gold) Midstate Golden Gloves (165 lbs), Nashville, Tennessee, February–March 1973:

- n/a

(bronze) National Golden Gloves (165 lbs), Memorial Auditorium, Lowell, Massachusetts, March 1973:

- 1/4: Defeated Johnny Johnson KO 1
- 1/2: Lost to Vonzell Johnson by decision (Johnson was given a standing eight count in the 1st rd)

Southern Golden Gloves (165 lbs), Nashville, Tennessee, January 1974:

- Henry Johnson

National Championships (165 lbs), Knoxville, Tennessee, June 1974:

- n/a

International Police Olympics (178 lbs), Nassau Community College, East Garden City, New York, August 1980:

- 1/4: Lost to Jim Krtinich KO

== Professional career ==
Hadley turned professional under Cus D'Amato and had his first fight on October 29, 1974, in Pittsfield, Massachusetts, beating boxer Gene Orten by knockout in the first round. Hadly would then have his next fight less than a month later on November 25, 1974, beating Pepe Ortiz by first-round knockout at the Felt Forum (now known as the Infosys Theater) in Madison Square Garden.

Hadley would go on to win his next five professional fights, winning all of them by knockout. Hadley would have his last professional fight on September 6, 1977, in West Memphis against Earl Thomas, winning by knockout in the second round in Hadley's first and only scheduled eight round fight.

In one of the earliest examples of a cross-discipline, mixed martial art match, Hadley fought a karate champion from Arkansas by the name of David Valovich on June 22, 1976. The latter was permitted to strike with his fists, feet, and knees, while Hadley was restricted to using only his fists. Hadley was forced to adapt his style to compensate fighting a karateka. Despite the apparent rule disadvantage, Hadley secured a first-round knockout victory.

== Professional boxing record ==
7 fights	7 wins	0 losses
By knockout	7	0
By decision	0	0

No.	Result	Record	Opponent	Opp Record	Type	Round, time	Date	Location	Notes
7	Win	7-0	(United States) Earl Thomas	0-1	KO	2 (8)	6 September 1977	(United States) Municipal Auditorium, West Memphis, Arkansas	
6	Win	6–0	(United States) John McClendon	0–4	KO	1 (4)	26 Apr 1977	(United States) Holiday Inn, Rivermont Hotel, Memphis, Tennessee	
5	Win	5–0	(United States) Phil Wade	0–1	TKO	4 (4)	29 Mar 1977	(United States) Holiday Inn, Rivermont Hotel, Memphis, Tennessee	
4	Win	4-0	(United States) Earl Thomas	debut	TKO	1 (4)	1 March 1977	(United States) Holiday Inn, Rivermont Hotel, Memphis, Tennessee	
3	Win	3-0	(United States) David Valovich	debut	TKO	1 (4)	25 June 1976	(United States) McCarver Stadium, Memphis, Tennessee	
2	Win	2–0	(United States) Pepe Ortiz	0–1	TKO	? (4)	25 Nov 1974	(United States) Felt Forum, New York City	
1	Win	1–0	(United States) Gene Orten	0–3	TKO	1 (4), 1:05	29 Oct 1974	(United States) Boys' Club gymnasium, Pittsfield, Massachusetts	Gene Orten took up the bout on a short notice, as Hadley's scheduled opponent Ray Rich of Lowell, Mass., failed to appear.
	Canc.		(United States) Cove Green	—N/a	NR	0 (4)	24 Sep 1974	Stade du 20 Mai, Kinshasa, Zaire	The card was cancelled for the main event was rescheduled due to George Foreman was cut during a sparring session.
	—N/a		(United States) Carl Harden	—N/a	—N/a	? (4)	13 Aug 1974	(United States) Sargent Field, New Bedford, Massachusetts	

== Mixed martial arts record ==
Professional record breakdown
1 match	1 win	0 losses
By knockout	1	0

Res.	Record	Opponent	Method	Event	Date	Round	Time	Location	Notes
Win	1–0	(United States) David Valovich	TKO (punches)	Mid-South Pro Boxing	June 22, 1976	1 (4)	1:38	Memphis Blues Baseball Park—Fairgrounds, Memphis, Tennessee, United States	Special feature

== Retirement and later life ==
Hadley's career ended after an eye infection while working in New York. He had multiple occupations afterwards, including becoming a radio and television traffic reporter, as well as being a Deputy Sheriff of Shelby County for 29 years.

As a former student of D'Amato, Hadley is one of the few boxing coaches to train people in the peek-a-boo style of boxing. One of his students included karate champion Bill Wallace, whom he taught punching skills such as the jab and the left hook.
