= Oleg Maltsev (psychologist) =

Ukrainian psychologist

Oleg Viktorovich Maltsev
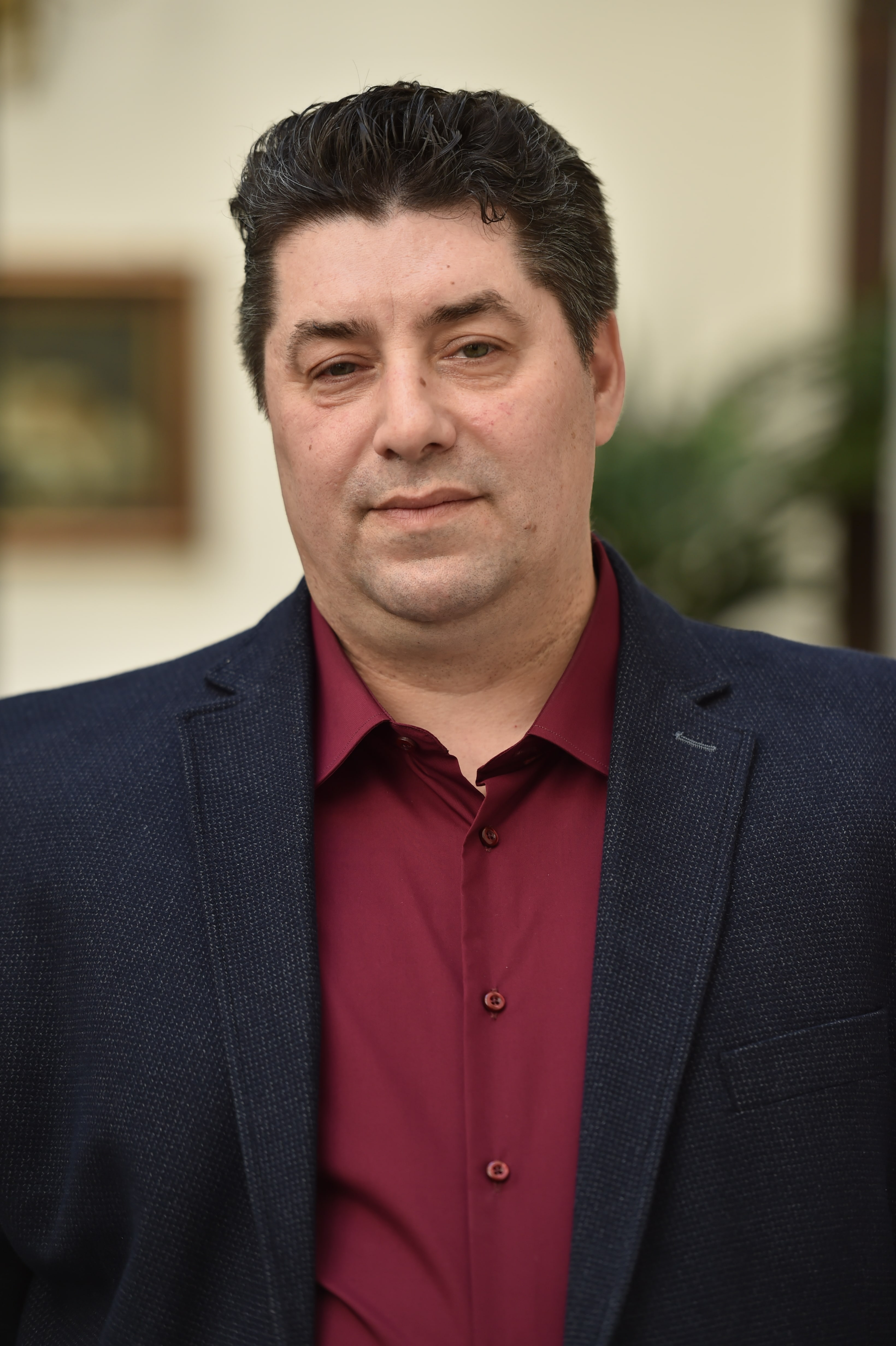
- Born: April 17, 1975 (age 51); Odesa, Ukraine
- Notable work: Non-compromised Pendulum
- Website: oleg-maltsev.com

Oleg Viktorovich Maltsev (born April 17, 1975) is a Ukrainian Candidate of Sciences in psychology and philosophy. He is the academician of the European Academy of Sciences of Ukraine, author, and criminologist, and a practicing lawyer registered with the Ukrainian National Bar Association.

He teaches a variation of the Fate Analysis method developed by Hungarian psychoanalyst Leopold Szondi through his organization called Applied Sciences Association. He is the chief editor of interdisciplinary journal Baudrillard Now, editorial member of French journal Dogma, editorial member of Expedition Journal and member of international editorial advisory board of the American Behavioral Scientist among other publications.

== Biography ==
Oleg V. Maltsev was born in Ukraine in 1975.

In 2014, Maltsev and collaborators established several organizations including the "Memory Institute", with the "Applied Science Association" serving as an umbrella organization. In 2016, Maltsev's group was accused of being a 'cult' by Alexander Dvorkin, the vice-president of European Federation of Centres of Research and Information on Sectarianism.

In 2017, Maltsev authored a book entitled Non-compromised Pendulum on boxing trainer Cus DAmato and his methods. Maltsev's co-author was Tom Patti, a student of DAmato. The work received positive reviews in Sports Illustrated and The Ring.

In August 2019, Oleg Maltsev, together with two other Ukrainian scientists, presented a joint monograph on the disclosure of Serial killings. Oleg Maltsev in this work did the bulk devoted to the description of the psycho-portrait of a serial killer.

In 2019, Maltsev was elected chairman of the Odesa Photographic Society.

Exponents of the anti-cult movement in Russia and Ukraine have criticized his association as a cult.

== Arrest and Detention ==
On September 14, 2024 Oleg Maltsev was arrested and charged with "attempting to disrupt the constitutional order of the country and creating an unauthorised paramilitary organisation" according to the European Times. The article notes that he has been held in the Odesa Detention Centre (SIZO) at least up to the date of the article (18 November 2024). He denies all the charges.

In March 2025, at the 58th session of the United Nations Human Rights Council, the NGO Coordination des Associations et des Particuliers pour la Liberté de Conscience issued a statement alleging that Oleg Maltsev and several of his associates had been unlawfully detained in Ukraine and were being held in inhumane conditions. The organization called on Ukrainian authorities to release him immediately.

== Criminology ==
Maltsev is the head of non-profit institute named Centre for Criminology in Ukraine. He has been exploring the origin and methods used by various criminal organizations such as Southern Italian 'Ndrangheta, Camorra and Sicilian Mafia; Russian and South African criminal traditions. Maltsev explained main reason behind his studies in this field during round table on criminology and in the interviews with Johnny Steinberg and Antonio Nicaso, that the better people are informed about the way criminals operate, the better countermeasures can be taken for the safety of civilian communities and businesses. In his view, criminal environment is the foundation that shapes mentality of criminals. Oleg Maltsev is Professor of Spanish Destreza and author of several books that are devoted exclusively to weapon handling of criminal organizations. Maltsev is the proponent of primary sources and within the research of weapon handling, he headed the group of his collaborators and translators that translated more than twenty 15-19th century treatises into Russian language from old Spanish, old Italian and old German for weapon handling analysis. Among those treatises are work of Gérard Thibault d'Anvers, Don Jerónimo Sánchez de Carranza, Luis Pacheco de Narváez, Nicoletto Giganti, Blasco Florio, Salvator Fabris.

== Books ==
- Maestro. Jean Baudrillard. The Last Prophet of Europe
- Non compromised Pendulum
- Lightning Rod that strikes faster than lightning itself
- Enigma or Crime: Real Life and Economics
