= 2024 Stockton, California, mayoral election =

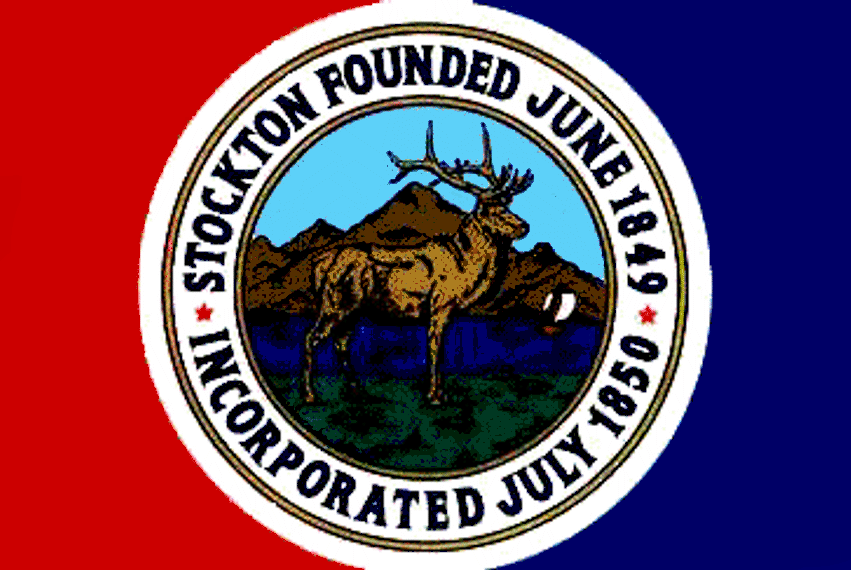
- March 5, 2024 (primary); November 5, 2024 (runoff)
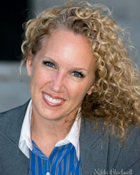

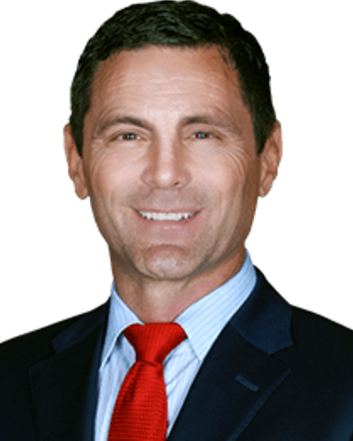

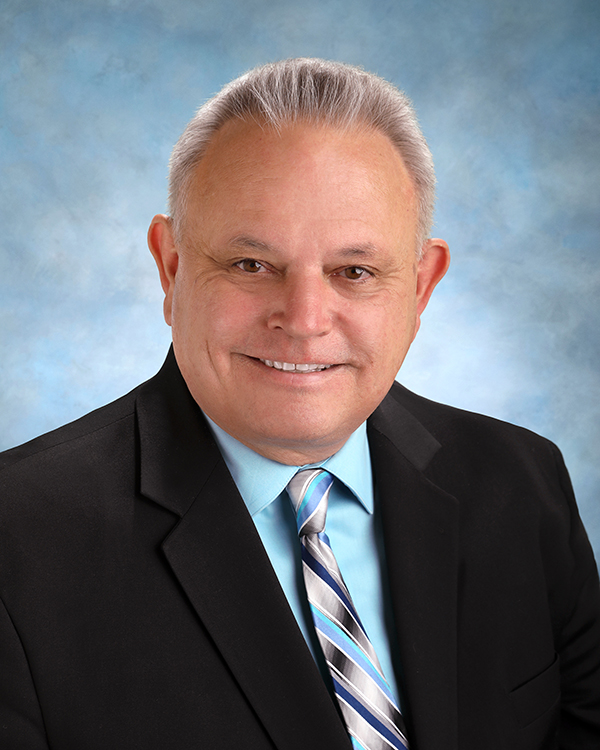

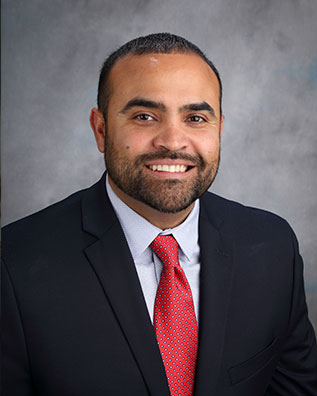

Candidate	Christina Fugazi	Tom Patti	Dan Wright
First round	8,696; 22.7%	13,200; 34.4%	7,190; 18.7%
Runoff	45,674; 54.0%	38,902; 46.0%	Eliminated
Candidate	Jesus Andrade	Jessica Velez
First round	5,113; 13.3%	2,962; 7.7%
Runoff	Eliminated	Eliminated
Mayor before election
Kevin Lincoln
Republican
Elected mayor
Christina Fugazi
Democratic

The 2024 election for mayor of Stockton, California was held on November 5, 2024. Incumbent Republican mayor Kevin Lincoln did not seek reelection, instead running for the United States House of Representatives in California's 9th congressional district against incumbent Democrat Josh Harder. In the first round held on March 5, Republican Tom Patti and Democrat Christina Fugazi advanced to the runoff in November.

Municipal elections in California are officially nonpartisan; candidates' party affiliations do not appear on the ballot.

On November 14, Christina Fugazi declared victory in the race, leading by 54% against Tom Patti at 46%.

== Candidates ==
=== Advanced to runoff ===
- Christina Fugazi, former vice mayor (party affiliation: Democratic)
- Tom Patti, San Joaquin County supervisor from the 3rd district and runner-up for California's 9th congressional district in 2022 (party affiliation: Republican)

=== Eliminated in primary ===
- Shakeel Ahmad, businessman
- Jesus Andrade, former city councilor
- Jessica Velez, nonprofit founder
- Dan Wright, city councilor

=== Declined ===
- Kevin Lincoln, incumbent mayor (party affiliation: Republican) (ran for U.S. House)

== Results ==
=== First round ===
2024 Stockton mayoral election
Candidate	Votes	%
Tom Patti	13,200	34.41
Christina Fugazi	8,696	22.67
Dan Wright	7,190	18.74
Jesus Andrade	5,113	13.33
Jessica Velez	2,962	7.72
Shakeel Ahmad	1,201	3.13
Total votes	38,362	100.00

=== Runoff ===
2024 Stockton mayoral election
Candidate	Votes	%
Christina Fugazi	45,674	54.00
Tom Patti	38,902	46.00

== Extra Links ==
Official campaign websites

- Christina Fugazi (D) for Mayor
- Tom Patti (R) for Mayor
