= Bobby Stewart =

American light heavyweight boxer, trainer of Mike Tyson

"Irish" Bobby Stewart won the National Golden Gloves Tournament in 1974 as a light heavyweight. He also fought at the US-hosted undercard of The Rumble in the Jungle as a professional boxer, but he will be best remembered as the first trainer for Mike Tyson, who discovered Tyson's tremendous potential and introduced him to boxing in 1980.

== Early years ==
Stewart was raised in Amsterdam, New York.

== Amateur boxing career ==
His amateur boxing record was 45–5 when he turned pro in 1974 being managed by Matt Baranski.

== Professional boxing career ==
Stewart left the ring in 1977 with a professional record of 13 wins and 3 losses.

== Professional boxing record ==
| 16 fights | 13 wins | 3 losses |
|---|---|---|
| By knockout | 9 | 2 |
| By decision | 4 | 1 |

== Juvenile detention counselor work ==
He was working as a juvenile detention counselor in Perth, NY when Mike Tyson sought him out for training as a boxer. Tyson was in the Tryon Residential Center for Boys when he contacted Stewart.

Stewart set conditions for working with Tyson that included better behavior and academic achievement. Tyson met Stewart's conditions and they began to work together. Stewart said, “He was a complete gentleman as he wanted to fight so bad.” Stewart also noticed Mike's physique; at 13, the young detainee from Brooklyn weighed 190 pounds while standing 5 feet 8 inches tall. Stewart told a friend, “Some have made him out to be a 120 pound weakling or something like that before I got hold of him but he wasn’t anything like that. I could tell he was strong and later I found out just how strong he really was.” His powerful build suggested boxing potential to Stewart and Tyson's work ethic strengthened that opinion.

Stewart loved working with troubled youth and he believed that boxing could be a way out of trouble for the kids he worked with.

Soon it became evident to Stewart that his 13-years-old trainee was punching so hard for his age, that he had a natural talent and a great potential to become a champion:

Mike and I were sparring one time. He hit me with a jab that almost knocked me down. Luckily, I had the next week off from Tryon, because my nose was broken, my eyes were all black.

Stewart took him to Cus D'Amato, a legendary trainer in the Catskill Mountains of New York, who had previously worked with Floyd Patterson. Stewart first took Tyson to D'Amato about once a week. In 1982, D'Amato was 72 and he took Tyson into his home and trained him to become the heavyweight champion of the world. D'Amato along with his head trainer Teddy Atlas prepared Tyson for a professional boxing career that included 58 bouts, 49 wins, just 4 losses, and 44 knockouts.

As the D'Amato's gym didn't have any heavyweight or light heavyweight of a comparable size and weight during the time of Tyson's arrival, Stewart, on Atlas' request, again stepped into the ring as the Tyson's sparring partner. Tyson, realising that this was his chance for a new life, went ferociously after Bobby. Stewart later recalled:

He was perfect . . . aggressive as hell.

In 1986, at age 20, "Iron" Mike Tyson became the youngest heavyweight boxing champion in history. It all started at Tryon with Bobby Stewart. Stewart and Tyson were reunited at D'Amato's gym in the Catskills for a Fox Sports video shoot in 2013. Stewart's last time with Tyson was later in 2013 when the former champ sent a limousine to pick up his first boxing mentor in Amsterdam, New York and bring him to Westbury, Long Island to see Tyson's one man show. They met for breakfast the following day.
