= Lou Filippo =

American boxer

Personal information
- Born: Lou Filippo; December 1, 1925 Los Angeles, California, U.S.
- Died: November 2, 2009 (aged 83) Downey, California, U.S.
- Weight: Lightweight

Boxing career

Boxing record
- Wins: 28
- Win by KO: 8
- Losses: 9
- Draws: 3
- No contests: 1

Lou Filippo (December 1, 1925 – November 2, 2009) was an American professional boxer and later boxing judge.

== Biography ==
Lou Filippo was born in Los Angeles, California on December 1, 1925. He attended Fremont High School in South Los Angeles, and served in the Navy during World War II.

Filippo fought more than 250 amateur fights and his professional record as a lightweight was 28 wins, 9 losses and 3 draws, with 8 knockouts. He retired in 1957.

Filippo later became a referee and judge, including judging 85 world championship fights, most famously being the judge that had Marvelous Marvin Hagler the winner over Sugar Ray Leonard in April 1987 in a fight that Leonard won by split decision. He continued to judge until his death. He played a referee in each of the first five Rocky films. He also had small roles in a number of other films.

Filippo was inducted into the World Boxing Hall of Fame and elected as its President in 1993. In 1997, Filippo was honored by the Cauliflower Alley Club.

After suffering a stroke, Filippo died in Los Angeles on November 2, 2009, at the age of 83.

== Filmography ==
Year	Title	Role	Notes
1976	Rocky	Referee	
1979	Rocky II	Referee	
1982	Rocky III	Rematch Referee	
1984	City Heat	Referee	
1985	Rocky IV	Las Vegas Referee	
1990	Rocky V	Referee	
2000	Knockout	Main Fight Referee	(final film role)

he was in the A team. Season 3 episode 16(champ) 1985.
