= José Torres (boxer) =

Puerto Rican boxer (1936–2009)

José Louis Torres

Personal information
- Nickname: Chegüi
- Nationality: American
- Born: José Louis Torres; May 3, 1936 Ponce, Puerto Rico
- Died: January 19, 2009 (aged 72) Ponce, Puerto Rico
- Weight: Light Heavyweight Middleweight

Boxing career
- Stance: Orthodox

Boxing record
- Total fights: 45
- Wins: 41
- Win by KO: 29
- Losses: 3
- Draws: 1
- No contests: 0
Medal record
Men's Boxing
Representing United States
Silver medal – second place	1956 Melbourne	Light Middleweight

José Louis "Chegüi" Torres (May 3, 1936 – January 19, 2009) was a Puerto Rican-born professional boxer who fought representing the United States. As an amateur boxer, he won a silver medal in the middleweight division at the 1956 Olympic Games in Melbourne. In 1965, he defeated Willie Pastrano to win the WBC, WBA, and lineal light-heavyweight championships. Torres trained with the legendary boxing trainer Cus D'Amato. In 1997, he was inducted into the International Boxing Hall of Fame.

== Amateur career ==
Born in the city of Ponce, Puerto Rico, Torres began boxing when he joined the United States Army as a teenager (he was 17 years old). His only amateur titles had come in Army and Inter-Service championships, several of which he had won. Torres was still in the Army when he won the silver medal in the light-middleweight division at the 1956 Melbourne Olympic Games, losing to László Papp of Hungary in the final.

Torres trained at the Empire Sporting Club in New York City with trainer Cus D'Amato.

He was the 1958 National AAU Middleweight Champion and also won the 1958 New York Golden Gloves 160 lb Open Championship.

== Professional career ==
He professionally debuted in 1958 with a first-round knockout of George Hamilton in New York. Twelve wins in a row followed, ten of them by knockout (including wins over contenders Ike Jenkins and Al Andrews). Afterward, he made his San Juan debut against Benny Paret, a future world welterweight champion from Cuba, in which Torres and Paret fought to a ten-round draw. In 1960, Torres went back to campaigning in New York, where he scored three wins that year, all by decision, including two over Randy Sandy.

In 1961, Torres made his hometown debut with a four-round knockout win in a rematch with Hamilton at Ponce. He had six more fights that year, winning all of them by knockout.

Torres kept his knockout streak alive through 1962 with three more knockout wins but, in 1963, he suffered his first loss, being stopped in five by Cuba's Florentino Fernández, the only boxer ever to beat Torres by a knockout as a professional. After that setback, Torres went back to training and had one more fight that year. That time around, he was able to beat another top contender in Don Fullmer, Gene Fullmer's brother, with a ten-round decision win in New Jersey.

In 1964, Torres beat a group of name boxers, including Jose Gonzalez, Walker Simmons (twice), Frankie Olivera, Gomeo Brennan, and former world Middleweight champion Carl ("Bobo") Olson, who was taken out in one round. After this, Torres was ranked number one among Light-Heavyweight challengers.

His title shot arrived in 1965 at Madison Square Garden. Torres defeated the International Boxing Hall Of Fame member and World Light Heavyweight champion Willie Pastrano. In doing so, Torres became the third Puerto Rican world boxing champion in history and the first Latin American to win the world Light Heavyweight title, knocking Pastrano out in round nine. Later that year, he fought a non-title bout versus Tom McNeeley (father of former Mike Tyson rival, Peter McNeeley) in San Juan, winning a ten-round decision.

In 1966, he successfully defended his crown three times, with 15-round decisions over Wayne Thornton and Eddie Cotton and a two-round knockout of Chic Calderwood. In his next defense, however, he would lose it to another Hall Of Fame member, Nigeria's Dick Tiger, by a decision in 15 rounds.

In 1967, he and Tiger had a rematch, with Torres losing a 15-round decision again. Many fans thought he should have won it that time, and as a consequence, a large riot followed the fight.

After his second defeat to Tiger, Torres only fought twice more (against Bob Dunlop in 1968 and Charley "Devil" Green in 1969), retiring after 1969.

== An active retirement ==
In his years after retiring from boxing, he became a representative of the Puerto Rican community in New York, meeting political leaders, giving lectures, and becoming the New York State Athletic Commission's Commissioner from 1984 to 1988. In 1986, he was chosen to sing the United States National Anthem before the World Lightweight championship bout between Jimmy Paul and Irleis Perez in Atlantic City, New Jersey. In 1990, he became President of the WBO until 1995. He was also a member of the International Boxing Hall of Fame.

== Author ==
Torres regularly contributed a column to the New York Post (which he obtained with the help of his friend, Pete Hamill), as well as to El Diario La Prensa, a Spanish language newspaper in New York City. He also wrote for The Village Voice. In 1971, he co-authored Sting Like a Bee, a biography of Muhammad Ali. In 1989, he wrote the Mike Tyson biography Fire and Fear: The Inside Story of Mike Tyson (which would be adapted into the 1995-HBO television movie, Tyson).

== Later years ==
In 2007, Torres announced his decision to move back to his hometown of Ponce, Puerto Rico and concentrate on writing books and articles related to sports and history. On August 6, 2008, Torres received a recognition for his military career.

== Death and legacy ==
Torres died in the morning of January 19, 2009, of a heart attack at his home in Ponce. There are plans to move his remains to the Panteón Nacional Román Baldorioty de Castro, a national pantheon (and cemetery) and museum, in Ponce, Puerto Rico. He is also recognized at Ponce's Parque de los Ponceños Ilustres in the area of sports. During his life, Torres was the subject of two documentaries by famed Japanese film director, Hiroshi Teshigahara.

== Professional boxing record ==
45 fights	41 wins	3 losses
By knockout	29	1
By decision	12	2
Draws	1	

No.	Result	Record	Opponent	Type	Round, time	Date	Location	Notes
45	Win	41–3–1	Charley Green	KO	2 (10), 1:31	14 Jul 1969	Madison Square Garden, New York City, New York, U.S.	
44	Win	40–3–1	Bob Dunlop	TKO	6 (10)	1 Apr 1968	Sydney Stadium, Sydney, New South Wales, Australia	
43	Loss	39–3–1	Dick Tiger	SD	15	16 May 1967	Madison Square Garden, New York City, New York, U.S.	For WBA, WBC, and The Ring light heavyweight titles
42	Loss	39–2–1	Dick Tiger	UD	15	16 Dec 1966	Madison Square Garden, New York City, New York, U.S.	Lost WBA, WBC, and The Ring light heavyweight titles
41	Win	39–1–1	Chic Calderwood	KO	2 (15), 2:06	15 Oct 1966	Hiram Bithorn Stadium, San Juan, Puerto Rico	Retained WBA, WBC, and The Ring light heavyweight titles
40	Win	38–1–1	Eddie Cotton	UD	15	15 Aug 1966	Las Vegas Convention Center, Las Vegas, Nevada, U.S.	Retained WBA, WBC, and The Ring light heavyweight titles
39	Win	37–1–1	Wayne Thornton	UD	15	21 May 1966	Shea Stadium, New York City, New York, U.S.	Retained WBA, WBC, and The Ring light heavyweight titles
38	Win	36–1–1	Tom McNeeley	UD	10	31 Jul 1965	Hiram Bithorn Stadium, San Juan, Puerto Rico	
37	Win	35–1–1	Willie Pastrano	TKO	9 (15), 3:00	30 Mar 1965	Madison Square Garden, New York City, New York, U.S.	Won WBA, WBC, and The Ring light heavyweight titles
36	Win	34–1–1	Carl Olson	KO	1 (10), 2:51	27 Nov 1964	Madison Square Garden, New York City, New York, U.S.	
35	Win	33–1–1	Gomeo Brennan	MD	10	4 Sep 1964	Miami Beach Convention Hall, Miami Beach, Florida, U.S.	
34	Win	32–1–1	Walker Simmons	KO	6 (10)	20 Jul 1964	Sargent Field, New Bedford, Massachusetts, U.S.	
33	Win	31–1–1	Frankie Olivera	TKO	5 (10)	22 Jun 1964	Sargent Field, New Bedford, Massachusetts, U.S.	
32	Win	30–1–1	Wilbert McClure	UD	10	15 May 1964	Madison Square Garden, New York City, New York, U.S.	
31	Win	29–1–1	Walker Simmons	TKO	8 (10), 2:29	21 Apr 1964	Sunnyside Gardens, New York City, New York, U.S.	
30	Win	28–1–1	José Gonzalez	UD	10	3 Jan 1964	Madison Square Garden, New York City, New York, U.S.	
29	Win	27–1–1	Don Fullmer	PTS	10	9 Oct 1963	Teaneck Armory, Teaneck, New Jersey, U.S.	
28	Loss	26–1–1	Florentino Fernández	TKO	5 (10), 2:07	25 May 1963	Hiram Bithorn Stadium, San Juan, Puerto Rico	
27	Win	26–0–1	Al Hauser	TKO	3 (10)	14 Dec 1962	Boston Garden, Boston, Massachusetts, U.S.	
26	Win	25–0–1	Obdulio Nuñez	KO	7 (12)	27 Jul 1962	Estadio Sixto Escobar, San Juan, Puerto Rico	Won Puerto Rican middleweight title
25	Win	24–0–1	Jimmy Watkins	RTD	7 (10)	10 Apr 1962	Utica Memorial Auditorium, Utica, New York, U.S.	
24	Win	23–0–1	Tony Montano	KO	4 (10)	28 Nov 1961	Houston, Texas, U.S.	
23	Win	22–0–1	George Price	KO	2 (10), 2:31	31 Oct 1961	Sam Houston Coliseum, Houston, Texas, U.S.	
22	Win	21–0–1	Ike White	KO	3 (10), 1:30	27 Jun 1961	Boston Arena, Boston, Massachusetts, U.S.	
21	Win	20–0–1	Mel Collins	KO	7 (10), 0:30	5 Jun 1961	Boston Arena, Boston, Massachusetts, U.S.	
20	Win	19–0–1	Bob Young	TKO	5 (10)	23 May 1961	Boston Arena, Boston, Massachusetts, U.S.	
19	Win	18–0–1	Bobby Barnes	KO	3 (10)	1 Apr 1961	Plaza Ballroom, Paterson, New Jersey, U.S.	
18	Win	17–0–1	Gene Hamilton	TKO	4 (10), 1:21	17 Feb 1961	Estadio Francisco Montaner, Ponce, Puerto Rico	
17	Win	16–0–1	Randy Sandy	UD	10	11 Jun 1960	Sunnyside Gardens, New York City, New York, U.S.	
16	Win	15–0–1	Tony Dupas	MD	10	15 Mar 1960	Buffalo Memorial Auditorium, Buffalo, New York, U.S.	
15	Win	14–0–1	Randy Sandy	PTS	10	30 Jan 1960	Armory, Elizabeth, New Jersey, U.S.	
14	Draw	13–0–1	Benny Paret	PTS	10	26 Sep 1959	Estadio Sixto Escobar, San Juan, Puerto Rico	
13	Win	13–0	Al Andrews	TKO	6 (8), 0:42	26 Jun 1959	Yankee Stadium, New York City, New York, U.S.	
12	Win	12–0	Joe Shaw	TKO	5 (10), 2:40	23 Apr 1959	Sunnyside Gardens, New York City, New York, U.S.	
11	Win	11–0	Leroy Oliphant	TKO	3 (10)	19 Mar 1959	Sunnyside Gardens, New York City, New York, U.S.	
10	Win	10–0	Eddie Wright	TKO	5 (8), 2:10	26 Feb 1959	Sunnyside Gardens, New York City, New York, U.S.	
9	Win	9–0	Isaac Jenkins	TKO	5 (10)	4 Dec 1958	Sunnyside Gardens, New York City, New York, U.S.	
8	Win	8–0	Burke Emery	TKO	5 (10), 2:07	3 Nov 1958	St. Nicholas Arena, New York City, New York, U.S.	
7	Win	7–0	Frankie Anselm	KO	9 (10), 2:12	13 Oct 1958	St. Nicholas Arena, New York City, New York, U.S.	
6	Win	6–0	Otis Woodward	TKO	5 (10)	29 Sep 1958	St. Nicholas Arena, New York City, New York, U.S.	
5	Win	5–0	Benny Doyle	KO	1 (6)	18 Aug 1958	Wrigley Field, Los Angeles, California, U.S.	
4	Win	4–0	Wes Lowry	PTS	6	5 Jul 1958	Eastern Parkway Arena, New York City, New York, U.S.	
3	Win	3–0	Joe Salvato	KO	4 (6), 1:40	21 Jun 1958	Eastern Parkway Arena, New York City, New York, U.S.	
2	Win	2–0	Walter Irby	PTS	6	7 Jun 1958	Eastern Parkway Arena, New York City, New York, U.S.	
1	Win	1–0	Gene Hamilton	KO	1 (4)	24 May 1958	Eastern Parkway Arena, New York City, New York, U.S.	

== Titles in boxing ==
=== Major world titles ===
- WBA light heavyweight champion (175 lbs)
- WBC light heavyweight champion (175 lbs)

=== The Ring magazine titles ===
- The Ring light heavyweight champion (175 lbs)

=== Regional/International titles ===
- Puerto Rican middleweight champion (160 lbs)

=== Undisputed titles ===
- Undisputed light heavyweight champion

== See also ==
- List of world light-heavyweight boxing champions
- List of Puerto Rican boxing world champions
- Sports in Puerto Rico
- Afro–Puerto Ricans

Sporting positions
Amateur boxing titles
Previous: Alex Ford	U.S. middleweight champion 1958	Next: Jimmy McQueen
World boxing titles
Preceded by Willie Pastrano	WBA light heavyweight champion March 30, 1965 – December 16, 1966	Succeeded by Dick Tiger
Preceded by Willie Pastrano	WBC light heavyweight champion March 30, 1965 – December 16, 1966	Succeeded by Dick Tiger
Preceded by Willie Pastrano	The Ring light heavyweight champion March 30, 1965 – December 16, 1966	Succeeded by Dick Tiger
Preceded by Willie Pastrano	Undisputed light heavyweight champion March 30, 1965 – December 16, 1966	Succeeded by Dick Tiger
Awards
Previous: Floyd Patterson vs. George Chuvalo	The Ring magazine Fight of the Year vs. Eddie Cotton; 1966	Next: Nino Benvenuti vs. Emile Griffith I
