= Cus D'Amato =

American boxing trainer (1908–1985)

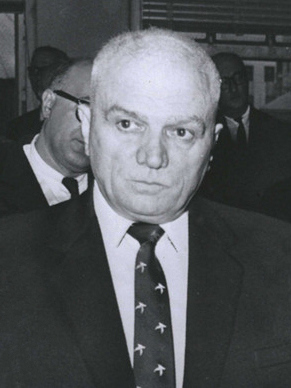
- D'Amato in 1959
- Born: Constantine D'Amato; January 17, 1908; The Bronx, New York City, U.S.
- Died: November 4, 1985 (aged 77); Manhattan, New York City, U.S.
- Occupations: Boxing manager Boxing promoter Boxing trainer
- Years active: 1933–1985

Constantine "Cus" D'Amato (January 17, 1908 – November 4, 1985) was an American boxing manager, boxing promoter and boxing trainer who handled the careers of Mike Tyson, Floyd Patterson, and José Torres, all of whom went on to be inducted into the International Boxing Hall of Fame. Several successful boxing trainers, including Teddy Atlas and Kevin Rooney, were among those he tutored.

He was a proponent of the peek-a-boo style of boxing, in which the fighter holds his gloves close to his cheeks and pulls his arms tight against his torso, which was criticized by some because it was believed that an efficient attack could not be launched from using the technique.

== Early life ==
Constantine D'Amato was born into an Italian-American family in the New York City borough of the Bronx on January 17, 1908, to Damiano (1868–1938) and Elisabetta (née Rosato; 1875–1913). Both his parents were from Toritto, province of Bari, Southern Italy, Region Puglia. His father delivered ice and coal in the Bronx using a horse and cart. He had three brothers, Rocco, Gerry, and Tony. At a young age, D'Amato became very involved and interested in Catholicism, and even considered becoming a priest during his youth.

He had a brief career as an amateur boxer, fighting as a featherweight and lightweight, but was unable to get a professional license because of an eye injury he had suffered in a street fight. His childhood was scarred by physical abuse that Cus suffered at the hands of his violent father. However, Cus stated in an interview that he did not hold any grudges towards his father for the childhood abuse, as he believed the beatings made him a better and a more disciplined man.

== Career ==
At age 22, D'Amato opened the Empire Sporting Club with Jack Barrow at Gramercy Gym in Manhattan, where he lived for years. He later recalled that he spent his time at the gym waiting for a "champion", but his best fighters were routinely poached by "connected" managers. One of them was Italian-American Rocky Graziano, who signed with other trainers and managers and went on to become middleweight champion of the world.

D'Amato also became known for his opposition to the International Boxing Club of New York (IBC) which dominated major boxing promotion in the 1950s and refused to match his fighters in IBC-promoted bouts. The IBC was later found to have violated antitrust laws and was dissolved.

=== Notable boxers trained ===
==== Floyd Patterson ====
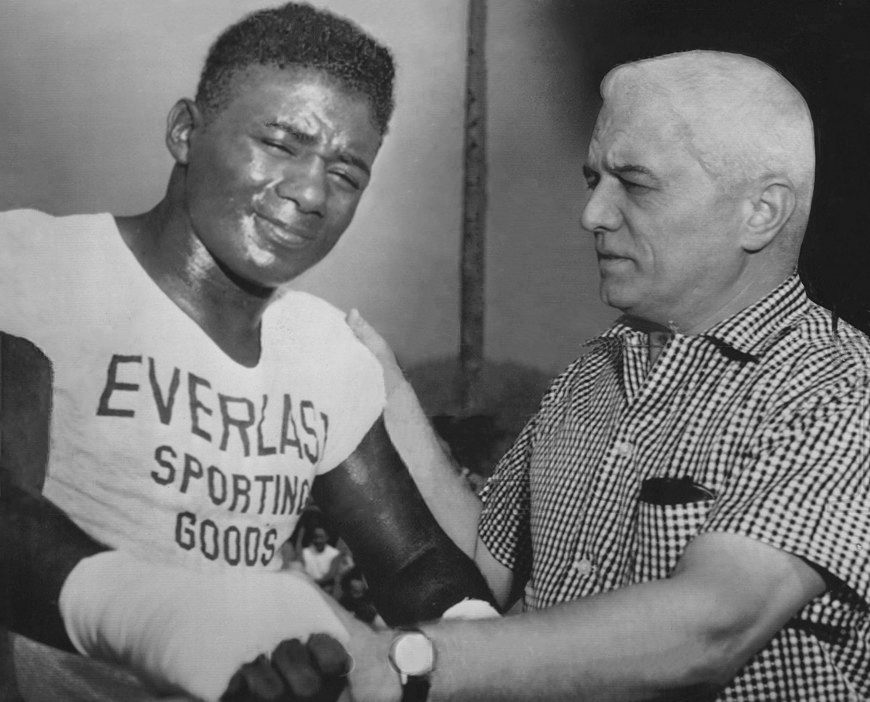
D'Amato and Patterson in 1957

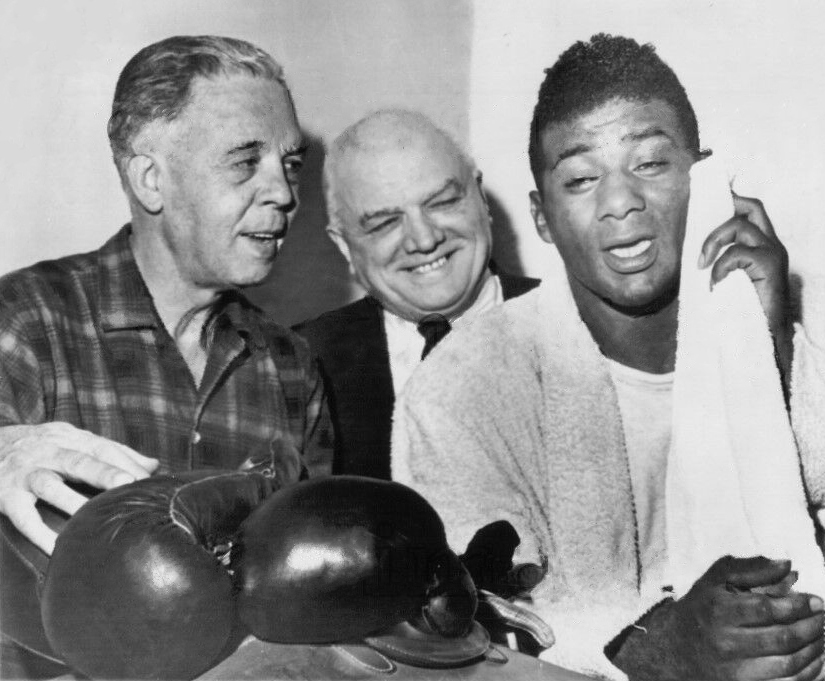
D'Amato and Patterson in 1961

Under D'Amato's tutelage, Floyd Patterson captured the Olympic middleweight gold medal in the 1952 Helsinki games. D'Amato then guided Patterson through the professional ranks, maneuvering Patterson into fighting for the title vacated by Rocky Marciano. After beating Tommy "Hurricane" Jackson in an elimination fight, Patterson faced Light Heavyweight Champion Archie Moore on November 30, 1956, for the World Heavyweight Championship. He beat Moore by a knockout in five rounds and became the youngest World Heavyweight Champion in history at the time, at the age of 21 years, 10 months, three weeks and five days. He was the first Olympic gold medalist to win a professional Heavyweight title.

Patterson and D'Amato split after Patterson's second consecutive 1st-round KO loss to Sonny Liston, although his influence over the former two-time champion had already begun to diminish.

==== José Torres ====
D'Amato also managed José Torres who, in May 1965 at Madison Square Garden, defeated International Boxing Hall Of Fame member Willie Pastrano to become world Light Heavyweight champion. With the victory Torres became the third Puerto Rican world boxing champion in history and the first Latin American to win the world Light Heavyweight title.

==== Mike Tyson ====
I think of a light bulb on Cus that says: 'I have found my Sonny Liston. I'm gonna do everything to coddle him, to protect him, to develop him, because he is my revenge on the world.'

— Jack Newfield on Tyson's special role in D'Amato's life

After Patterson and Torres' careers ended, D'Amato worked in relative obscurity. He eventually moved to Catskill, New York, where he opened a gym, the Catskill Boxing Club. There he met and began to work with the future heavyweight champion, "Iron" Mike Tyson, who was in a nearby reform school. He adopted Tyson after Tyson's mother died. D'Amato trained him over the next few years, encouraging the use of peek-a-boo style boxing, with the hands in front of the face for more protection. D'Amato was briefly assisted by Teddy Atlas, and later Kevin Rooney, a protégé of D'Amato, who emphasized elusive movement.

It is unclear at exactly which age (11 or 12) Tyson first became seriously interested in becoming a professional boxer. "Irish" Bobby Stewart, a former Golden Gloves Champion, was approached by Tyson while working as a counselor at the Tryon School For Boys. Tyson knew of Stewart's former boxing glory and specifically asked to speak with Stewart who immediately took on a gruff attitude to the subject after witnessing Tyson's terrible behavior in his first days at the school. Bobby Stewart introduced Mike Tyson to D'Amato when Tyson was around 12 or 13 years old, after Stewart stated he had taught Tyson all he could about boxing technique and skill. D'Amato died a little over a year before Tyson became the youngest world heavyweight titleholder in history at the age of 20 years four months, thus supplanting Patterson's record. Rooney would guide Tyson to the heavyweight championship twelve months after D'Amato's death. Footage of D'Amato can be seen in Tyson, a 2008 documentary. Tyson credits D'Amato with building his confidence and guiding him as a father figure.

==== Joe Hadley ====
D'Amato also trained amateur boxer Joe Hadley, who became a six-time Golden Gloves of the Memphis and Mid-South. Hadley later became notable as a pioneer of mixed martial arts when, in June 22, 1976, he fought a cross-discipline match with the Arkansas Karate Champion, David Valovich. To compensate with fighting a karateka, Hadley had to modify D'Amato's pee-ka-boo style to defend against both fists and kicks. Hadley managed to knock out Valovich in the first round.

== Personal life ==
Cus D'Amato and Camille Ewald (1905–2001) met in the 1940s and entered into a common-law relationship. Ewald was born in Staromishchyna, Ukraine, to Hnat and Anastasia Pershyn Ewaschuk, and adopted the surname Ewald after her family immigrated to Canada. Ewald supported D'Amato in his dedication to training socially challenged youths, and she allowed her home to function as a halfway house for D'Amato's pupils, often fulfilling the role of a mother figure to them. Most notably, D'Amato and Ewald, in anticipation of Mike Tyson's future athletic success, established legal guardianship over the young man in an effort to protect him both personally and financially from the cutthroat boxing establishment. D'Amato and Ewald never married, although their close friendship lasted for decades, until his death. Cus oversaw all the training and managing of his fighters, while she was responsible for cooking and household chores.

== Death ==
D'Amato died of pneumonia at Mount Sinai Hospital in Manhattan on November 4, 1985. He was 77.

== Legacy ==
=== Cus D'Amato Memorial Award ===
Cus D'Amato Memorial Award was established by the Boxing Writers Association of America. The first was presented to Mike Tyson at the group's 61st annual dinner, May 16, 1986.

=== Science of Victory Marathon ===
From October 26, 2017, through November 4, 2017, an international, online "Science of Victory" marathon was dedicated to the memory of Cus D'Amato. Several journalists and boxers from Russia, Ukraine, Italy, Spain, Germany and the U.S. took part in this project, including Silvio Branco, Patrizio Oliva, Dr. Antonio Graceffo, Avi Nardia, and Gordon Marino. The marathon promoted the book Non-compromised Pendulum by Tom Patti and Dr. Oleg Maltsev, which reviewed Cus D'Amato's training style.

=== Portrayals in media ===
George C. Scott portrayed D'Amato in the 1995 HBO movie Tyson.

KNOCKOUT: The Cus D'Amato Story is a stage and screenplay based on the life of Cus D'Amato, from a concept by boxing trainer Kevin Rooney and written by Dianna Lefas.

Harvey Keitel portrayed him in the 2022 Hulu TV series Mike.

Dr. Scott A. Weiss Author of Confusing The Enemy, The Cus D'Amato Story -Confusing the Enemy: The Cus D’Amato Story is the first biography in the world about Cus D'Amato by Dr. Scott Weiss and Paige Stover Hague that offers the most deeply researched and comprehensive portrait of legendary boxing trainer Cus D’Amato. The book traces D’Amato’s battles against powerful figures like Jim Norris of Madison Square Garden and underworld fixer Frankie Carbo, framing his life as a three‑way war for control of boxing during the Floyd Patterson era. It explores Cus’s revolutionary psychological and technical system, his mentorship of fighters such as Mike Tyson, Floyd Patterson, and José Torres, and his advisory relationship with Muhammad Ali. The narrative highlights the contradictions that defined him—an anti‑corruption crusader who still navigated underworld business ties, a man who condemned monopolies while negotiating unprecedented financial deals, and a figure viewed as both a savior and a gangster. Built on eleven years of interviews and research, the book reconciles myth, rumor, and fact to deliver an intimate, fly‑on‑the‑wall account of gyms, negotiations, and backroom politics, ultimately presenting the clearest and most nuanced portrait ever written of one of boxing’s most enigmatic and influential minds.

=== Commemoration ===
In 1993, the 14th Street Union Square Local Development Corporation named part of 14th Street, where D'Amato's Gramercy Gym was located, Cus D'Amato Way.
