= Donny Lalonde =

Canadian boxer

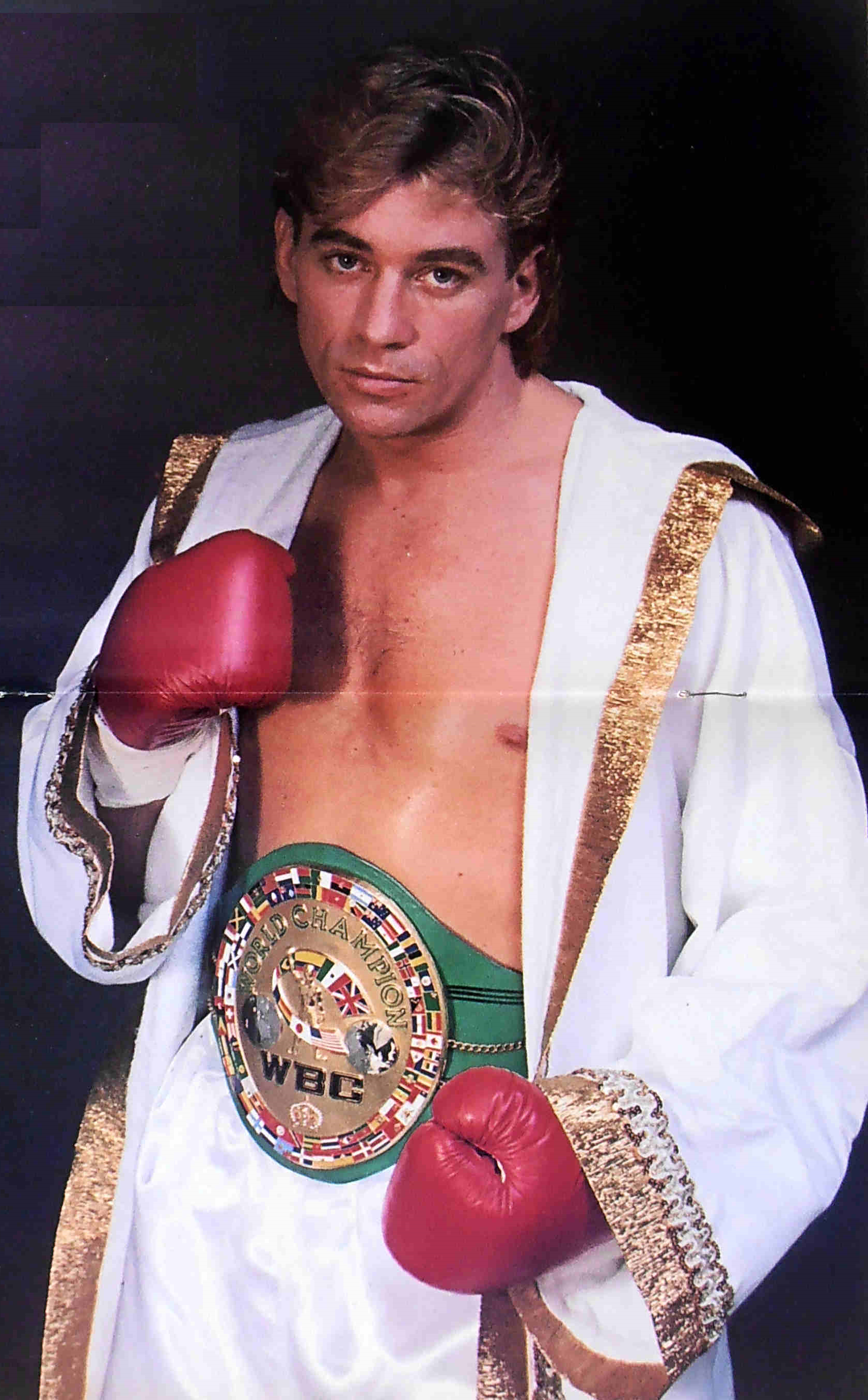
- Lalonde c. 1988

Personal information
- Nickname: Golden Boy
- Born: Donald Drew Lalonde; March 12, 1960 (age 66) Kitchener, Ontario, Canada
- Weight: Light Heavyweight; Cruiserweight

Boxing career
- Stance: Orthodox

Boxing record
- Total fights: 47
- Wins: 41
- Win by KO: 33
- Losses: 5
- Draws: 1
- No contests: 0

Donny Lalonde (born March 12, 1960) is a retired professional boxer. His nickname is "Golden Boy," after the Golden Boy statue atop the Manitoba Legislative Building in his boxing home town of Winnipeg. Lalonde held the WBC Light Heavyweight Championship from 1987 to 1988.

== Early career ==
Lalonde was born in Kitchener, Ontario, Canada. He got into boxing "to try to reestablish self-esteem, respect, pride," he said. "Boxing is a way of doing that." Lalonde had an amateur record of 11-4 and turned professional in 1980.

== Early professional career ==
Lalonde won his first four fights and then lost a six-round decision to Wilbert "Vampire" Johnson in March 1981. They had a rematch seven months later, which Lalonde won by a second-round knockout.

In 1983, Lalonde won the Canadian Light Heavyweight Championship, knocking out Roddie McDonald in ten rounds. He defeated McDonald even though he had a smashed middle knuckle on his right hand and was recovering from surgery on his left shoulder, which he first separated when he crashed into the boards while playing hockey in 1977.

Over the years, the shoulder had separated some thirty times and had become so loose that he was able to pop it back into socket himself. To prepare for his fight with McDonald, he underwent an operation in which doctors inserted a pin to bind the joint, which severely restricted his ability to raise his left arm. It affected Lalonde's style: He would paw with his left, looking to set up his powerful right.

In 1985, with a record of 19-1, Lalonde fought Willie Edwards for the NABF Light Heavyweight Championship. Edwards stopped Lalonde in nine rounds.

== Rise to the top ==
At the end of 1985, Lalonde hired Dave Wolf as his manager and Teddy Atlas as his trainer. Lalonde went 8-0 with Atlas as his trainer, but they clashed in temperament and style. He and Atlas parted ways, and Lalonde hired Tommy Gallagher and Bobby Cassidy as his new trainers.

In his first fight with Gallagher and Cassidy, he outpointed Mustafa Hamsho on May 7, 1987. His next fight was for a world title. On November 27, 1987, Lalonde knocked out Eddie Davis in two rounds to win the vacant WBC Light Heavyweight Championship in Port of Spain, Trinidad and Tobago. His first title defense was also in Port of Spain. On May 29, 1988, he knocked out former WBA Light Heavyweight Champion Leslie Stewart in five rounds.

On November 7, 1988, Lalonde fought Sugar Ray Leonard at Caesars Palace in Las Vegas, Nevada. It was by far the biggest fight of his career. Lalonde's purse was six million dollars. They fought for Lalonde's WBC Light Heavyweight Championship and the newly created WBC Super Middleweight Championship, which meant that Lalonde had to make 168 lbs. Some were concerned that moving down from the light heavyweight limit of 175 lbs would weaken Lalonde, but he told HBO's Larry Merchant after the fight that he had no trouble making weight, and he felt great on the night of the fight.

Lalonde's size and awkwardness troubled Leonard. In the fourth round, a right hand to the top of Leonard's head dropped him for just the second time in his career. Early in the ninth, Lalonde hurt Leonard with a right to the chin. Leonard fired back and hurt Lalonde with a right. He drove him to the ropes and unleashed a furious assault. Lalonde tried to tie up Leonard, but got dropped with a powerful left hook. He rose but was soon down again, and the fight was stopped. Leonard won his fourth and fifth world titles.

== Retirement and return ==
After Leonard vacated the WBC Light Heavyweight Championship, Lalonde was scheduled to fight Dennis Andries for the title on June 24, 1989 in Atlantic City, New Jersey. Shortly before the fight, Lalonde shocked many by retiring. "I just don't have the desire to hit people anymore," Lalonde said.

Lalonde returned to boxing in 1991. After four straight wins, he fought Bobby Czyz for the WBA Cruiserweight Championship on May 9, 1992 in Las Vegas. Czyz dropped Lalonde in the first round with a left hook. Lalonde got up and survived the round, but for the rest of the fight, Czyz continued to come forward and land effectively with left jabs and hooks. Czyz retained his title with a twelve-round unanimous decision.

After losing to Czyz, Lalonde was inactive for four years. He returned to the ring and won three straight fights, then fought a six-round draw with Kevin Pompey in 1998. Lalonde stayed out of the ring again until 2002. After three consecutive wins, Lalonde fought former two-division champion Virgil Hill in Winnipeg on July 7, 2003.

In the first round, Lalonde fell into the ropes after getting hit by a left hook. The referee ruled it a knockdown, but Lalonde said the fall was due more to bad footwork. Lalonde spent most of the fight backpedaling and looking to land his right hand. Hill controlled the fight, landing frequently with jabs and hooks while avoiding Lalonde's powerful right. Hill won by a ten-round unanimous decision. It was Lalonde's last fight. He finished with a record of 41-5-1 with 33 knockouts.

== Teddy Atlas' book revelation ==
In 2006, Teddy Atlas published his autobiography, Atlas: From the Streets to the Ring: A Son's Struggle to Become a Man. In the book, he revealed that he came close to murdering Lalonde. "When he made six million for Leonard, it tore me up," Atlas wrote. "It made me murderous." If Atlas had not been fired by Lalonde and he had trained him for the Leonard fight, he would've gotten 10% of his purse, $600,000. This according to Lalonde "assuming Lalonde would have won a world title, successfully defended it and got the Leonard fight under Teddy's tutelage. Lalonde states he was regressing under Atlas's mental and emotional psychological demeaning way of communication and likely would never have succeeded had he stayed with Atlas.

Atlas described getting a gun and going to Lalonde's apartment building in New York City. After getting buzzed into the building by another tenant, Atlas went to Lalonde's apartment and knocked on the door. "If he had opened the door, he was dead," Atlas wrote. "I would have pulled the trigger, turned around, and walked away." However, there was no answer.

Atlas waited through the night for Lalonde to return, periodically phoning the apartment. When he finally got through, Lalonde's girlfriend answered. When asked if Lalonde was home, she said yes. Atlas hung up and started making his way over to the apartment. Somewhere along the way, for whatever reason, Atlas changed his mind.

Lalonde knew nothing about it until the book came out and a friend told him about it. "It actually didn't surprise me when I heard it," he said. "Teddy got into fights with trainers and fighters quite a bit when I was with him. He may not be the most stable person walking around. Also, I did not live in the apartment Teddy says he spoke to my girlfriend in for almost a year at the point he says "he phoned and spoke to my girlfriend". That is just a lie I guess he decided to use to spice up and help sell his book. Lalonde says after a career spanning 23 years of which Teddy trained him for 11 months and was paid a weekly salary for his time, that Teddy had no right to any of the Leonard purse or related money. The Leonard fight happened almost exactly two years after the relationship ended. Lalonde says Bobby Cassidy and Tommy Gallagher, who took over from Atlas in Queen's N.Y in Nov '86, as well as Peter Piper and Al Sparks his trainers from early in his career in Winnipeg Canada were much more instrumental in the development of the skills he ultimately garnered from the wisdom they all imparted to him which provided him the techniques and skills required to become Champion of the world which Lalonde accomplished by destroying Eddie Davis in the second round in Trinidad in 1987, one year after leaving Atlas. "

== Honors ==
Lalonde was inducted into the Manitoba Sports Hall of Fame and Museum in 1990. Between 2019-2004 Lalonde was also inducted into the Canadian boxing hall of fame, the Indiana boxing hall of fame and the New York state boxing hall of fame.

== T.K.O.O.O ==
"TKOOO" (Taking "K"are Of Our Own) is an initiative headed by LaLonde with the aim of "helping boxers live a healthier life in their golden years", with the stated mission of the initiative being to "educate fighters on the benefits of natural and preventative medicine, including the reduction or elimination of the trauma induced effects of combat sport."

== Controversies ==
In 2004, Lalonde declared bankruptcy in B.C., owing $1.5 million to creditors, mostly linked to failed real estate ventures, and moved to Tamarindo in northwestern Costa Rica where he sold pre-construction lots in a new community. Ten years later, about 30 investors hired a lawyer, hoping to recoup $3.5 million in a class-action lawsuit. As of 2020, no development has taken place

== Personal life ==
Lalonde is married to the same girl he met three weeks before the Leonard fight in 1988. Christi, who Lalonde met backstage after she performed with The Beach Boys at Ceasars Palace where Lalonde was training for his historic fight against Sugar Ray Leonard in Nov 1988. Donny and Christi have two children, Zachary Dylan (34) and Bailey Gray (32). They will celebrate their 35th anniversary May 4 this year 2026.

As written in People magazine, Lalonde meditates daily and was known to have prayed before his fights that nobody would be hurt. In 1988, William Nack commented that Lalonde's "diet is chiefly vegetarian; he eschews all processed foods. He drinks juices out of his own squeezer and eats his meals with chopsticks. He trains to the music of Bob Dylan and Cat Stevens. He submits himself daily to the painful rigors of deep-tissue massaging, or rolfing."

== Professional boxing record ==
41 Wins (33 knockouts, 8 decisions), 5 Losses (2 knockouts, 3 decisions), 1 Draw
Res.	Record	Opponent	Type	Round	Date	Location	Notes
Loss	41-5-1	(United States) Virgil Hill	UD	10	2003-07-05	CanWest Global Park, Winnipeg, Manitoba, Canada	
Win	41-4-1	(Canada) Willard Lewis	UD	10	2003-03-14	Convention Centre, Winnipeg, Manitoba, Canada	
Win	40-4-1	(United States) Stacy Goodson	KO	1 (10)	2002-12-06	Convention Centre, Winnipeg, Manitoba, Canada	
Win	39-4-1	(United States) Tony Menefee	UD	8	2002-10-02	Convention Centre, Winnipeg, Manitoba, Canada	
Draw	38-4-1	(United States) Kevin Pompey	SD	8	1998-05-28	(United States) Westchester County Center, White Plains, New York	
Win	38-4	(United States) Joe Stevenson	TKO	7 (10)	1997-04-09	(United States) The Aladdin, Las Vegas, Nevada	
Win	37-4	(Canada) George Sponagle	KO	3 (8)	1996-12-12	Pacific Coliseum, Vancouver, British Columbia, Canada	
Win	36-4	(United States) Ed Dalton	UD	8	1996-11-02	Memorial Arena, Victoria, British Columbia, Canada	
Loss	35-4	(United States) Bobby Czyz	UD	12	1992-05-08	(United States) Riviera Hotel & Casino, Winchester, Nevada	For WBA Cruiserweight title.
Win	35-3	(Canada) Dave Fiddler	TKO	3 (10)	1991-12-17	Convention Centre, Winnipeg, Manitoba, Canada	
Win	34-3	(United States) David Bates	KO	4 (10)	1991-12-03	(United States) Memphis, Tennessee	
Win	33-3	(United States) Bert Gravley	TKO	7 (10)	1991-09-20	(United States) Sun Dome, Tampa, Florida	
Win	32-3	(United States) Darryl Fromm	TKO	3 (10)	1991-09-05	LuLu's Road House, Kitchener, Ontario, Canada	
Loss	31-3	(United States) Sugar Ray Leonard	TKO	9 (12)	1988-11-07	(United States) Caesars Palace, Las Vegas, Nevada	Lost WBC Light Heavyweight title. For WBC Super Middleweight title.
Win	31-2	(Trinidad and Tobago) Leslie Stewart	TKO	5 (12)	1988-05-29	National Stadium, Port of Spain, Trinidad and Tobago	Retained WBC Light Heavyweight title.
Win	30-2	(United States) Eddie Davis	TKO	2 (12)	1987-11-27	National Stadium, Port of Spain, Trinidad and Tobago	Won vacant WBC Light Heavyweight title.
Win	29-2	(Syria) Mustafa Hamsho	UD	12	1987-05-07	(United States) Felt Forum, New York City, New York	Won WBC Americas Light Heavyweight title.
Win	28-2	(United States) Benito Fernandez	TKO	9 (10)	1986-11-06	Convention Centre, Winnipeg, Manitoba, Canada	
Win	27-2	(United States) Charles Henderson	TKO	8 (10)	1986-09-30	(United States) Premier Center, Sterling Heights, Michigan	
Win	26-2	(United States) Terrence Walker	TKO	6 (10)	1986-08-28	(United States) Felt Forum, New York City, New York	
Win	25-2	(United States) Frank Walters	KO	1 (10)	1986-08-12	(United States) Ashland Armory, Ashland, Kentucky	
Win	24-2	(United States) Lenny Edwards	TKO	3 (10)	1986-04-30	(United States) Lakeland Community College, Mentor, Ohio	
Win	23-2	(United States) Joe Brewer	TKO	3 (10)	1986-04-06	(United States) Essex Racquet Club, West Orange, New Jersey	
Win	22-2	(United States) Roberto Rodriguez	TKO	2 (8)	1986-02-08	(United States) Enid, Oklahoma	
Win	21-2	(United States) Ronnie Crawford	TKO	2 (10)	1986-01-21	(United States) Trade Winds Central Inn, Oklahoma City, Oklahoma	
Win	20-2	(United States) Jamie Howe	UD	10	1985-08-28	(United States) Wheeling, West Virginia	
Loss	19-2	(United States) Willie Edwards	TKO	9 (12)	1985-05-16	Winnipeg Arena, Winnipeg, Manitoba, Canada	For NABF Light Heavyweight title.
Win	19-1	(United States) John Jones	TKO	3 (10)	1985-04-26	(United States) Hammond, Indiana	
Win	18-1	(Canada) Don Hurtle	TKO	6 (12)	1984-09-08	Winnipeg Arena, Winnipeg, Manitoba, Canada	Retained Canada Light Heavyweight title.
Win	17-1	(United States) Carlos Tite	TKO	2 (10)	1984-06-28	(United States) Holiday Star Theatre, Merrillville, Indiana	
Win	16-1	(Canada) Jimmy Gradson	KO	1 (12)	1984-02-11	Community Arena, Winnipeg, Manitoba, Canada	Retained Canada Light Heavyweight title.
Win	15-1	(United States) Nathaniel Akbar	KO	3 (10)	1983-11-25	Pacific Coliseum, Vancouver, British Columbia, Canada	
Win	14-1	(Canada) Roddy MacDonald	TKO	10 (10)	1983-07-04	Wilfrid Laurier University, Waterloo, Ontario, Canada	Won Canada Light Heavyweight title.
Win	13-1	(Canada) Don Hurtle	UD	8	1982-11-15	Royal York Hotel, Toronto, Ontario, Canada	
Win	12-1	(United States) Frank Lux	KO	2 (8)	1982-10-07	International Inn, Winnipeg, Manitoba, Canada	
Win	11-1	(United States) Jimmy Baker	TKO	8 (8)	1982-09-30	Marshall Hall, Kitchener, Ontario, Canada	
Win	10-1	(United States) Akbar Abdullah	TKO	2 (8)	1982-08-23	(United States) Ramsey, Minnesota	
Win	9-1	(United States) Ken Johnson	KO	2 (6)	1982-06-29	Convention Centre, Winnipeg, Manitoba, Canada	
Win	8-1	(Canada) Randy Jackson	KO	2 (6)	1982-02-12	International Inn, Winnipeg, Manitoba, Canada	
Win	7-1	(United States) Akbar Abdullah	UD	6	1981-12-10	Convention Centre, Winnipeg, Manitoba, Canada	
Win	6-1	(Canada) Jean-Claude LeClair	TKO	2 (8)	1981-11-03	Paul Sauvé Arena, Montreal, Quebec, Canada	
Win	5-1	(United States) Wilbert Johnson	TKO	2 (6)	1981-10-10	Convention Centre, Winnipeg, Manitoba, Canada	
Loss	4-1	(United States) Wilbert Johnson	UD	6	1981-03-06	Convention Centre, Winnipeg, Manitoba, Canada	
Win	4-0	(United States) Jimmy Green	TKO	3 (6)	1981-01-20	Convention Centre, Winnipeg, Manitoba, Canada	
Win	3-0	(United States) Muhammed Smith	KO	1 (4)	1980-11-12	Convention Centre, Winnipeg, Manitoba, Canada	
Win	2-0	(Canada) Edmond Esquirol	UD	4	1980-09-16	Convention Centre, Winnipeg, Manitoba, Canada	
Win	1-0	(Canada) Ken Nichols	TKO	2 (4)	1980-04-24	Convention Centre, Winnipeg, Manitoba, Canada	Professional debut.

Achievements
Vacant Title last held by Virgil Hill	WBC Continental Americas; Light Heavyweight Champion; 7 May 1987 - 27 November 1987; Won world title	Vacant Title next held by Mike Peak
Preceded by Thomas Hearns; Vacated	WBC Light Heavyweight Champion; 27 Nov 1987 – 7 Nov 1988	Succeeded by Sugar Ray Leonard
