= Teddy Atlas =

American boxing trainer, sports commentator

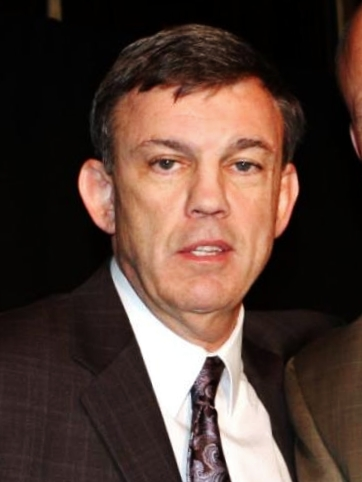
- Atlas in 2011
- Born: July 29, 1956 (age 70)
- Occupation: Boxing trainer
- Organization: Dr. Theodore Atlas Foundation
- Spouse: Elaine
- Children: Teddy Atlas III and Nicole

YouTube information
- Channel: The Fight with Teddy Atlas
- Years active: 2019–present
- Genre: Podcast
- Subscribers: 336 thousand
- Views: 94.4 million

Theodore A. Atlas Jr. (born July 29, 1956) is an American boxing trainer and fight commentator.

== Early life ==
The son of a doctor, Atlas grew up in a wealthy area of Staten Island, New York City, New York. His mother, Mary Riley Atlas, was a former contestant in the Miss America pageant system, as well as a model. His father was of Hungarian Jewish ancestry and his mother of Irish descent. Atlas was raised in his mother's Catholic faith and spent summers in Spring Lake, New Jersey, with his family's friends.

By his own admission, Atlas had a somewhat troubled, rebellious youth. He dropped out of school and was arrested several times. He participated in an armed robbery and served time on Rikers Island. Atlas was involved in a street fight in Stapleton, Staten Island, in which his face was severely slashed with a "007" pocketknife. The wound took 400 stitches in total to close, with 200 on the outside of his face and 200 on the inside. The attack left him with a distinctive scar.

== Career ==
=== Boxing trainer ===
Atlas trained as an amateur boxer with Hall of Fame trainer Cus D'Amato. He had some amateur fights and won a 135-pound Golden Gloves title but had to turn to work as a trainer due to a back injury. Atlas was an assistant to D'Amato, although his role in the Catskill Boxing Club was short-lived. In 1980 he trained the Sweden Olympic Boxing Team for the 1980 Summer Olympics. His duties included assisting in the training of D'Amato's teenage protégé Mike Tyson. However, Atlas left the camp in 1982 following an altercation with the 15-year-old Tyson after Tyson allegedly had been sexually inappropriate with an 11-year-old female relative of Atlas' (Tyson said he had grabbed the girl's buttocks, according to Atlas). Atlas put a .38 caliber handgun to Tyson's ear and told him to never touch his family again, or he would kill him if he did. This altercation between Atlas and a young Mike Tyson led to Atlas' dismissal from the Catskill Boxing Club—D'Amato supposedly offered Atlas 5% of Tyson's lifetime-future earnings to just walk away (Atlas insists he refused the offer but agreed to leave the following week). D'Amato said he would no longer welcome Teddy into his home or around any of his adopted children (his fighters whom he had legally adopted, Tyson included).

Atlas enjoyed his biggest success as head trainer to Michael Moorer, whom he guided to the world heavyweight title in 1994. He drew criticism for what some considered to be overly dramatic speeches in the ring corner, particularly during Moorer's heavyweight title fight with Evander Holyfield, and some felt he did this to draw attention to himself rather than help his fighter. During one such speech, Atlas blocked Moorer from sitting on his stool and asked, "Do you want me to take over?" Atlas has denied this, stating that he did what he believed the fighter needed based on his understanding of the fighter. Moorer went on to defeat Holyfield by a majority decision, with Moorer's manager John Davimos crediting Atlas' motivation, stating "I don't know if Michael could have done this without Teddy Atlas."

Atlas also worked the corners of featherweight world champion Barry McGuigan in one fight and light heavyweight Donny Lalonde. Lalonde was a top-ranked boxer and went 8–0 with Atlas as his trainer, but they clashed in temperament and style. "He ran things like an army camp," Lalonde said, "I'm more of a free spirit." Lalonde also said it was a waste of time in his career. He and Atlas parted ways, and Lalonde hired Tommy Gallagher as his new trainer. In his autobiography, Atlas claimed he was so angry at having been fired by Lalonde that he went to Lalonde's house with a gun intending to kill him. However, Lalonde refuted Atlas' story, claiming he did not even live at the apartment Atlas described at the time. Lalonde also called Atlas "the least significant of all my trainers throughout my career."

In 2009, Atlas began training Russian heavyweight Alexander Povetkin as Povetkin prepared for an eventual title match against Wladimir Klitschko. Povetkin was a former world amateur champ and was the number one contender. Atlas said that Povetkin "wasn't ready" for Klitschko

In 2015, Atlas returned to training to prepare Timothy Bradley for his welterweight title defense against Brandon Rios. With Atlas in his corner, Bradley knocked out Rios in the ninth round of their fight, which took place on November 7, 2015, in Las Vegas.

In September 2018 Atlas agreed to train Oleksandr Gvozdyk for upcoming fight with Adonis Stevenson on December 1, 2018 in Montreal for WBC and lineal light heavyweight titles.

In 2019, when asked who, in his opinion, was the best overall of the boxers he had trained, he said Wilfred Benítez.

=== Sportscasting ===
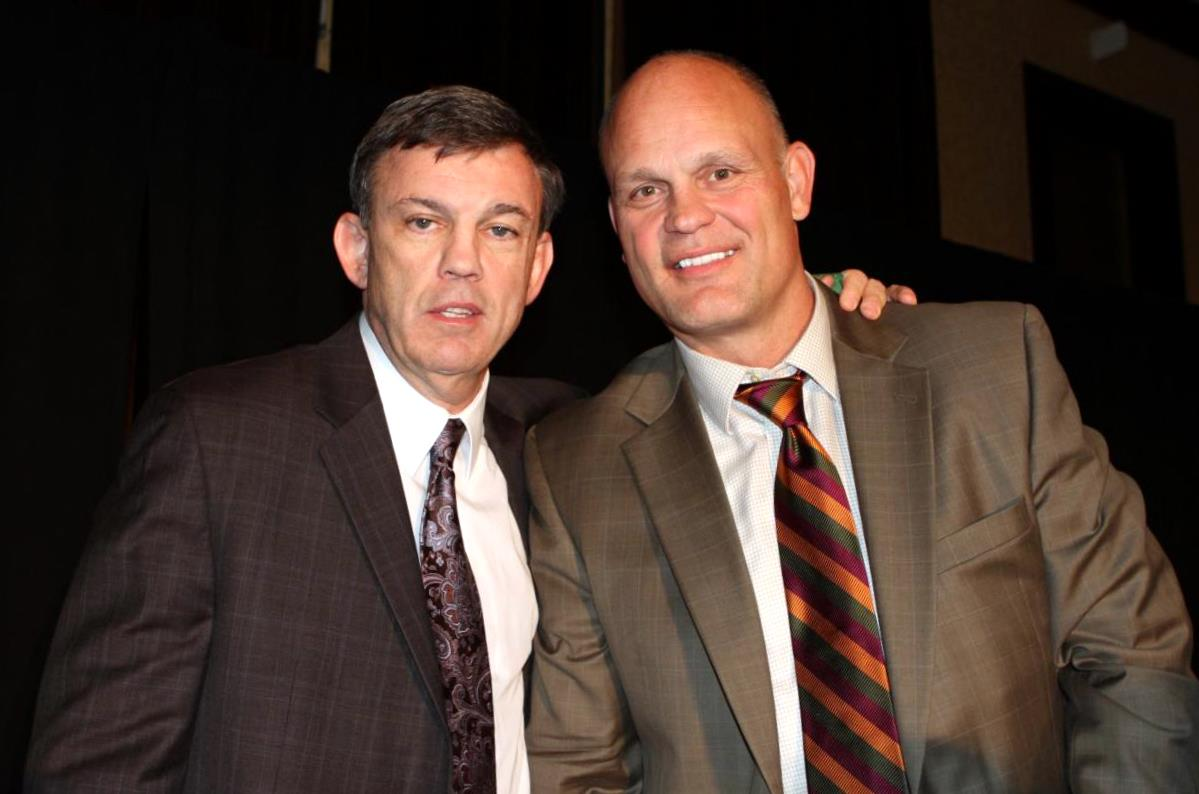
Atlas with Ken Daneyko, 2011

Atlas served as a commentator for ESPN, formerly for ESPN2's Friday Night Fights and Wednesday Night Fights and later for ESPN's Premier Boxing Champions fights. On January 25, 2008, Atlas was suspended by ESPN twice, once for threatening a crew member and once (for one week) after confronting the network's boxing program director, Doug Loughrey. Atlas accused Loughrey of showing favoritism to certain promoters and matchmakers, who were abusing their ESPN connections by taking fighters from other promoters with promises of potential ESPN dates. In December 2017, Atlas was removed from ESPN's live fight coverage after 21 years of ringside commentating following his criticism of the judging in the Manny Pacquiao–Jeff Horn fight. He is in contract until 2020, and continues to provide boxing analysis for ESPN.

In 2001, Atlas won the Sam Taub Award for excellence in boxing broadcasting journalism. Atlas worked as a boxing commentator for NBC's coverage of the Olympic Games in Sydney (2000), Athens (2004), Beijing (2008), London (2012) and Rio de Janeiro (2016).

Atlas was a contributor on fight doctor Ferdie Pacheco's The 12 Greatest Rounds of Boxing DVD. In it, he stated that in the first Ali-Liston fight, during the famous "blind round" in which Ali could not see after being hit by Liston's gloves which had been smeared in a substance that temporarily blinded Ali, he would have refused to have cut Ali's gloves off and would have simply sent him out with the advice to just "run".

Atlas is also featured as a member of the in-game commentary team on Fight Night Round 4 and Fight Night Champion, alongside Joe Tessitore.

Since 2019, he has hosted his own boxing podcast The Fight with Teddy Atlas.

=== Other ===
In 1989 he was part of the cast and the crew in the film Triumph of the Spirit which portrays the story of Salamo Arouch, a Jewish Greek boxer who survived the Holocaust by boxing (over 200 bouts) for the entertainment of German Nazi officers in Auschwitz Concentration Camp. Atlas played the role of Klaus Silber, main antagonist in the movie. He was also a boxing consultant for Willem Dafoe.

== Personal life ==
Atlas is married to Elaine, with whom he has two children: Teddy III and Nicole. Teddy III is a scout for the NFLPA Collegiate Bowl.

In 1997, he founded the Dr. Theodore Atlas Foundation to honor the memory of his father. The foundation awards scholarships and grants to individuals and organizations. Atlas published his autobiography, Atlas: From the Streets to the Ring: A Son's Struggle to Become a Man, in 2006. The book covers many different periods of Atlas's life and compares his position as trainer to a role as a father.

== Honors ==
Atlas has been inducted into the New Jersey Boxing Hall of Fame and was inducted into the Staten Island Sports Hall of Fame in 2005.

== Trained boxers ==
- Chris Reid (IBF super middleweight contender)
- Jimmy McMahon
- Timothy Bradley
- Felix Santiago
- Donny Lalonde 1985–1986, 8 fights
- Michael Moorer 1993–1997, 7 fights
- Barry McGuigan
- Michael Grant 2001–2003, 9 fights
- Alexander Povetkin 2009–2011, 6 fights
- Oleksandr Gvozdyk 2018 – 2019, 3 fights

== See also ==
- List of people from Staten Island § Boxing
