= Muhammad Ali vs. Joe Bugner II =

Boxing match

The Fight of a Lifetime
- Date: 1 July 1975
- Venue: Merdeka Stadium, Kuala Lumpur, Malaysia
- Titles on the line: WBA, WBC and The Ring undisputed heavyweight championship

Tale of the tape
| Boxer | (United States) Muhammad Ali | (United Kingdom) Joe Bugner |
| Nickname | "The Greatest" | |
| Hometown | Louisville, Kentucky, U.S. | Szőreg, Southern Great Plain, Hungary |
| Purse | $2,000,000 | $500,000 |
| Pre-fight record | 47–2 (34 KO) | 51–6–1 (30 KO) |
| Age | 33 years, 5 months | 25 years, 3 months |
| Height | 6 ft 3 in (191 cm) | 6 ft 4 in (193 cm) |
| Weight | 224 1/2 lb (102 kg) | 230 lb (104 kg) |
| Style | Orthodox | Orthodox |
| Recognition | WBA, WBC and The Ring undisputed Heavyweight Champion | WBC; No. 2 Ranked Heavyweight; European; Heavyweight Champion |

Result
- Ali defeated Bugner by 15th round Unanimous Decision

Muhammad Ali vs. Joe Bugner II, billed as The Fight of a Lifetime, was a professional boxing match contested on 1 July 1975, for the undisputed heavyweight championship.

== Background ==
The 1975 title fight with Bugner was Ali's third title defense since 1974, and was held in Kuala Lumpur, Malaysia, and remains the only world heavyweight championship fight hosted in the nation's history. Being held in June, the location of the fight was very hot, creating difficulties for both men. The two had fought two years earlier with Ali winning a competitive 12 round Unanimous Decision.

== The fight ==
Despite the heat, Ali performed very well, fighting aggressively against the bigger challenger, forcing Joe against the ropes and clinching to prevent counters and also used his now famous rope-a-dope tactic minimally. Bugner lasted the 15 round distance, and once again neither man was knocked down, but Ali won the fight on points by a comfortable margin.

== Aftermath ==
This was Ali's last fight before the famous Thrilla in Manila, a third fight with Ali's arch-rival Joe Frazier.

== Undercard ==
Confirmed bouts:

| Winner | Loser | Weight division/title belt(s) disputed | Result |
|---|---|---|---|
| (Australia) Lionel Rose | (Japan) Bomber Uchida | Super Feather (10 rounds) | Unanimous decision. |
| (Norway) Bjorn Rudi | (United States) Levi Forte | Heavyweight (6 rounds) | 3rd-round KO. |

== Broadcasting ==
| Country | Broadcaster |
|---|---|
| Mexico | Televisa |
| Philippines | KBS 9 |
| United Kingdom | BBC |

| Preceded by vs. Ron Lyle | Muhammad Ali's bouts 1 July 1975 | Succeeded by vs. Joe Frazier III |
| Preceded by vs. Dante Cane | Joe Bugner's bouts 1 July 1975 | Succeeded by vs. Richard Dunn |
