= Muhammad Ali vs. Rudie Lubbers =

Boxing competition

- Date: October 20, 1973
- Venue: Gelora Senayan Main Stadium, Jakarta, Indonesia

Tale of the tape
Boxer	(United States) Muhammad Ali	(Netherlands) Rudie Lubbers
Nickname	"The Greatest"	
Hometown	Louisville, Kentucky, U.S.	Heerhugowaard, North Holland, Netherlands
Pre-fight record	42–2 (32 KO)	21–1 (11 KO)
Age	31 years, 9 months	28 years, 2 months
Height	6 ft 3 in (191 cm)	6 ft 0 in (183 cm)
Weight	217 1/2 lb (99 kg)	196 lb (89 kg)
Style	Orthodox	Orthodox
Recognition	Former undisputed heavyweight champion	Dutch heavyweight champion

Result
- Ali defeated Lubbers via 12th round Unanimous Decision

Muhammad Ali vs. Rudie Lubbers was a professional boxing match contested on October 20, 1973, at Gelora Senayan Main Stadium (now at Gelora Bung Karno Stadium), Jakarta, Indonesia.

== Background ==
Ali was a 4 to 1 betting favourite going into the bout.

== The fight ==
Ali dominated the fight and won the bout through a unanimous decision on points.

The fight is notable for the interview Ali gave to ITV commentator Reg Gutteridge during the interval between rounds, with Gutteridge leaning through the ropes of the ring. This is believed to be the only interview of its kind.

== Aftermath ==
Ali's next bout was a rematch against Joe Frazier.

== Undercard ==
Confirmed bouts:

== Broadcasting ==
Country	Broadcaster
Mexico	Televisa
Philippines	KBS 9
United Kingdom	ITV
United States	ABC

Preceded by vs. Ken Norton II	Muhammad Ali's bouts 20 October 1973	Succeeded by vs. Joe Frazier II
Preceded by vs. Joe Bugner	Rudie Lubbers's bouts 20 October 1973	Succeeded by vs. Jean Pierre Coopman
