= Rudolphus Lubbers =

Lubbers may refer to:

- Ruud Lubbers (1939–2018), Dutch politician
- Rudie Lubbers (b. 1945), Dutch Olympic boxer
