= Muhammad Ali vs. Joe Bugner =

Boxing competition

- Date: February 14, 1973
- Venue: Las Vegas Convention Center, Las Vegas, U.S.

Tale of the tape
Boxer	(United States) Muhammad Ali	(United Kingdom) Joe Bugner
Nickname	"The Greatest"	
Hometown	Louisville, Kentucky, U.S.	Szőreg, Southern Great Plain, Hungary
Pre-fight record	40–1 (31 KO)	43–4–1 (26 KO)
Age	31 years	22 years, 11 months
Height	6 ft 3 in (191 cm)	6 ft 4 in (193 cm)
Weight	217 1/4 lb (99 kg)	219 lb (99 kg)
Style	Orthodox	Orthodox
Recognition	Former undisputed heavyweight champion	European; Heavyweight Champion

Result
- Ali won via Unanimous decision

Muhammad Ali vs. Joe Bugner was a professional boxing match contested on February 14, 1973.

== Background ==
After returning from his nearly four year boxing ban, former champion Muhammad Ali attempted to take the heavyweight title from the new champion Joe Frazier in March 1971. The much anticipated fight, dubbed Fight of the Century, resulted in Ali suffering his first professional defeat, losing a 15-round decision to Frazier. Undeterred, Ali went on to win nine straight fights in under 18 months before facing off with Bugner.

Joe Bugner rose to prominence around the same time of the first Ali-Frazier fight, winning the British, Commonwealth and European heavyweight titles in a close 15-round match with the famous Henry Cooper. Although he lost the titles six months later, he regained the European title the following year, after scoring an eight-round knockout over new champion Jürgen Blin.

== The fight ==
The pair faced off in Las Vegas on February 14, 1973. Ali was heavily favored to defeat Bugner, and was given 8-1 odds. Ali entered the match confident, and predicted that he would stop Bugner in seven rounds. Ali entered the ring wearing a robe studded in jewels and bearing the phrase People’s Choice, the robe was a gift from Elvis Presley.

Bugner lost the fight, but fought well, earning the respect of the crowd and Ali. Despite suffering a cut over the left eye in the first round, Bugner fought on courageously and went the 12 round distance, neither man being knocked down.

== Aftermath ==
Ali later stated he believed Bugner had what it took to become the future world heavyweight champion, an opinion shared with his trainer Angelo Dundee. This would be Ali's last fight before his infamous fight with Ken Norton less than two months later.

=== Rematch ===
Bugner went on to fight Joe Frazier, losing a hard-fought 12-round match to the former champion. After these defeats, Bugner mounted an eight fight win streak, holding his European title and rising to #5 among the top ten heavyweight contenders, leading to his world heavyweight title shot. After suffering his second professional defeat, Ali avenged both loses in rematches with both Norton and Frazier, before regaining the world heavyweight title in a 1974 fight with George Foreman.

The 1975 title fight with Bugner was Ali's third title defense since 1974, and was held in Kuala Lumpur, Malaysia, and remains the only world heavyweight championship fight hosted in the nation's history. Bugner lasted the 15 round distance, and once again neither man was knocked down, but Ali won the fight on points by a comfortable margin. This was Ali's last fight before the famous Thrilla in Manila, a third fight with Ali's arch-rival Joe Frazier.

== Undercard ==
Confirmed bouts:

Preceded by vs. Bob Foster	Muhammad Ali's bouts 14 February 1973	Succeeded by vs. Ken Norton
Preceded by vs. Rudie Lubbers	Joe Bugner's bouts 14 February 1973	Succeeded by vs. Joe Frazier
