= Gelora Bung Karno Stadium =

Stadium in Jakarta, Indonesia

Coordinates: 6°13′6.88″S 106°48′9.04″E

Gelora Bung Karno Main Stadium
- Stadion Utama Gelora Bung Karno
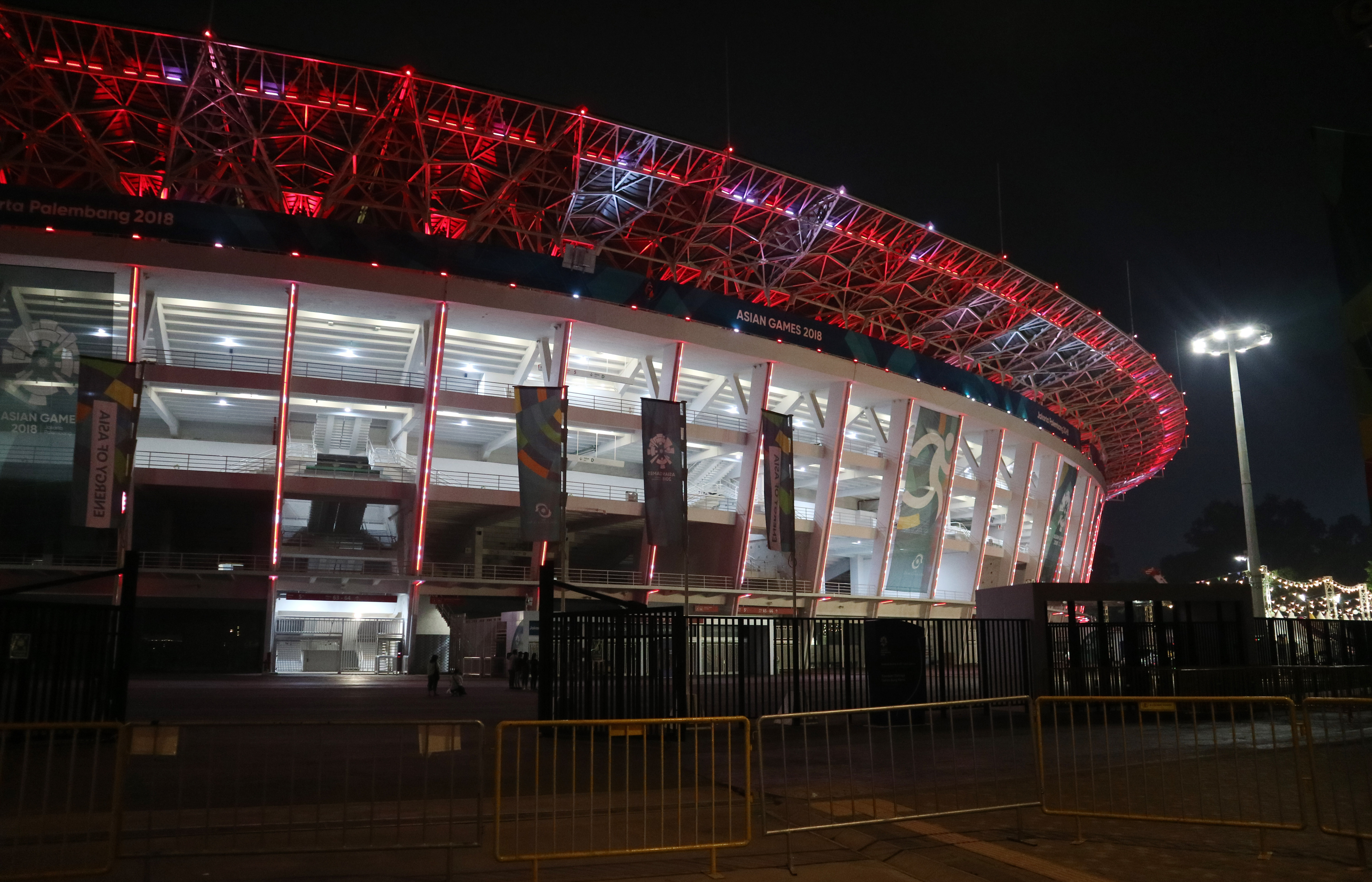
- Portrait during the 2018 Asian Games
- Interactive map of Gelora Bung Karno Main Stadium
- Former names: Senayan Main Stadium (until 24 September 1962); Gelora Senayan Main Stadium (1969 – 17 January 2001)
- Location: Gelora, Tanah Abang, Central Jakarta, Indonesia
- Owner: Government of Indonesia (Note: Via Ministry of State Secretariat)
- Operator: Gelora Bung Karno Complex Management Center
- Capacity: 77,193 (Note: Capacity history: 110,000 (1962–2007), 88,306 (2007–2016), 77,193 (2018–present))
- Executive suites: 4
- Surface: Zeon Zoysia
- Scoreboard: Seiko
- Record attendance: 150,000 (Note: Persib Bandung v PSMS Medan (23 February 1985))
- Field size: 105 by 68 m (344 by 223 ft)
- Public transit: Istora Mandiri; Senayan Bank Jakarta; Gerbang Pemuda

Construction
- Groundbreaking: 8 February 1960; 66 years ago (entire complex)
- Opened: 21 July 1962; 64 years ago
- Renovated: 2016–2018
- Closed: 2016–2018
- Reopened: 14 January 2018; 8 years ago
- Cost: $12,500,000 (1958, entire complex); IDR769.69 billion (2016–2018, equal to about US$58.5 million with 2016 exchange rate)
- Architect: Friedrich Silaban (entire Gelora Bung Karno Sports Complex)

Tenants
- Indonesia national football team (1962–present); Persija Jakarta (2008–present) (Note: Selected matches, alongside Jakarta International Stadium)

Website
- gbk.id/venue/stadion-utama-gelora-bung-karno-1

Gelora Bung Karno Main Stadium (Indonesian: Stadion Utama Gelora Bung Karno, lit. 'Bung Karno Sports Arena Main Stadium'; abbreviated as SUGBK or GBK), formerly Senayan Main Stadium and Gelora Senayan Main Stadium, is a multi-purpose stadium located at the center of the Gelora Bung Karno Sports Complex in Central Jakarta, Indonesia. It is mostly used for football matches, and usually used by the Indonesia national football team and Super League club Persija Jakarta. The stadium is named after Sukarno, the first president of Indonesia, who sparked the idea of building the sports complex.

When first opened prior to the 1962 Asian Games, the stadium had a seating capacity of 110,000. It has been reduced twice during renovations: first to 88,306 in 2006 for the 2007 AFC Asian Cup and then to 77,193 single seats as part of renovations for the 2018 Asian Games and Asian Para Games, where it hosted the ceremonies and athletics competitions. Due to the most recent renovation which saw all remaining bleachers replaced by single seats, it is the 28th largest association football stadium in the world and the 8th largest association football stadium in Asia.

== History ==
=== Under Sukarno: construction and inauguration ===
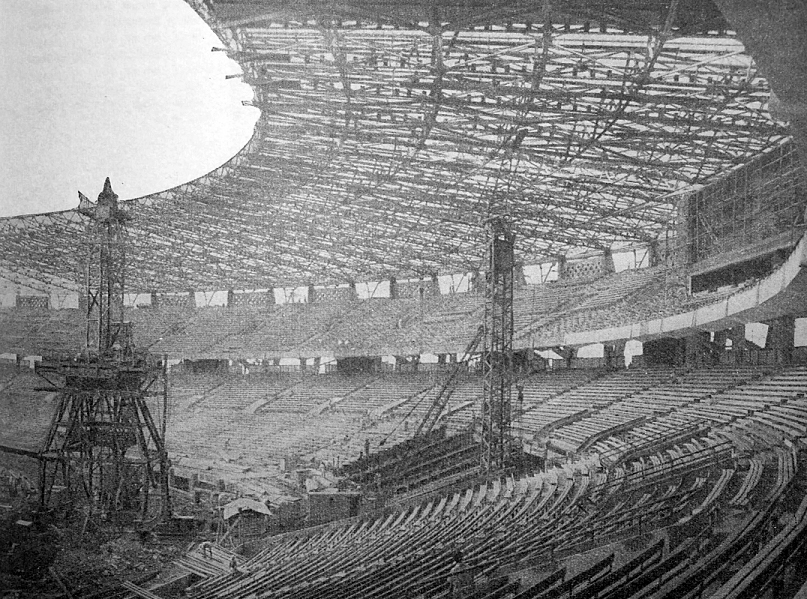
The stadium under construction, April 1962

After the Asian Games Federation declared Jakarta to host the 1962 Asian Games in 1958, the minimum requirement that had yet to be met by the Jakarta was the availability of a multi-sport complex. In response to this, President Sukarno issued Presidential Decree No. 113/1959 dated 11 May 1959 about the establishment of the Asian Games Council of Indonesia (DAGI) led by Minister of Sports Maladi. As an architect and civil engineering graduate, Sukarno proposed a location near M. H. Thamrin Boulevard and Menteng (Karet, Pejompongan, or Dukuh Atas) for the future sports complex. then Sukarno accompanied Friedrich Silaban, a renowned architect to review the location of the proposed sports complex by helicopter. Silaban disagreed with the selection of Dukuh Atas because he argued the construction of a sports complex in the center the future downtown area would potentially create a massive traffic congestion. Sukarno agreed Silaban suggestion and instead assigned the Senayan area with an area of approximately 300 hectares.

Construction began on 8 February 1960 and finished on 21 July 1962, in time to host the following month's Asian Games. It was built as part of Sukarno's construction sprees before the 1962 Asian Games and the centerpiece of the Sports Complex. Its construction was partially funded through a special loan from the Soviet Union. The stadium's original capacity was 110,000 people. The stadium is well known for its gigantic ring-shaped facade (a.k.a. "temu gelang"), as the world's first circular roof football stadium and also was designed to shade spectators from the sun, and increase the grandeur of the stadium. The idea came from Sukarno himself and although Soviet architects didn't want to implement temu gelang at first due to its unusual design, but Sukarno insisted and he got his way in the end. Although the stadium is popularly known as Gelora Bung Karno Stadium (Stadion Gelora Bung Karno) or GBK Stadium, its official name is Gelora Bung Karno Main Stadium (Stadion Utama Gelora Bung Karno), as there are other stadiums in the Gelora Bung Karno Sports Complex, such as the Sports Palace and the secondary stadium. It was known as Senajan (EYD: Senayan) Main Stadium from its opening through the 1962 Asiad until the complex's name was changed to Gelora Bung Karno by a Presidential Decree issued on 24 September 1962, twenty days after the games ended.

=== Under Soeharto: Gelora Senayan ===
During the New Order era, the complex was renamed "Gelora Senayan Complex" and the stadium was renamed "Gelora Senayan Main Stadium" in 1969. The name changes was part of the "de-Sukarnoization" policy by military junta government under Suharto.

At the 1985 Perserikatan Final, Match Persib Bandung against PSMS Medan which was held at this stadium became an amateur match with the largest attendance of 150,000 spectators. The match was finally won by PSMS Medan.

=== Reformasi–present ===
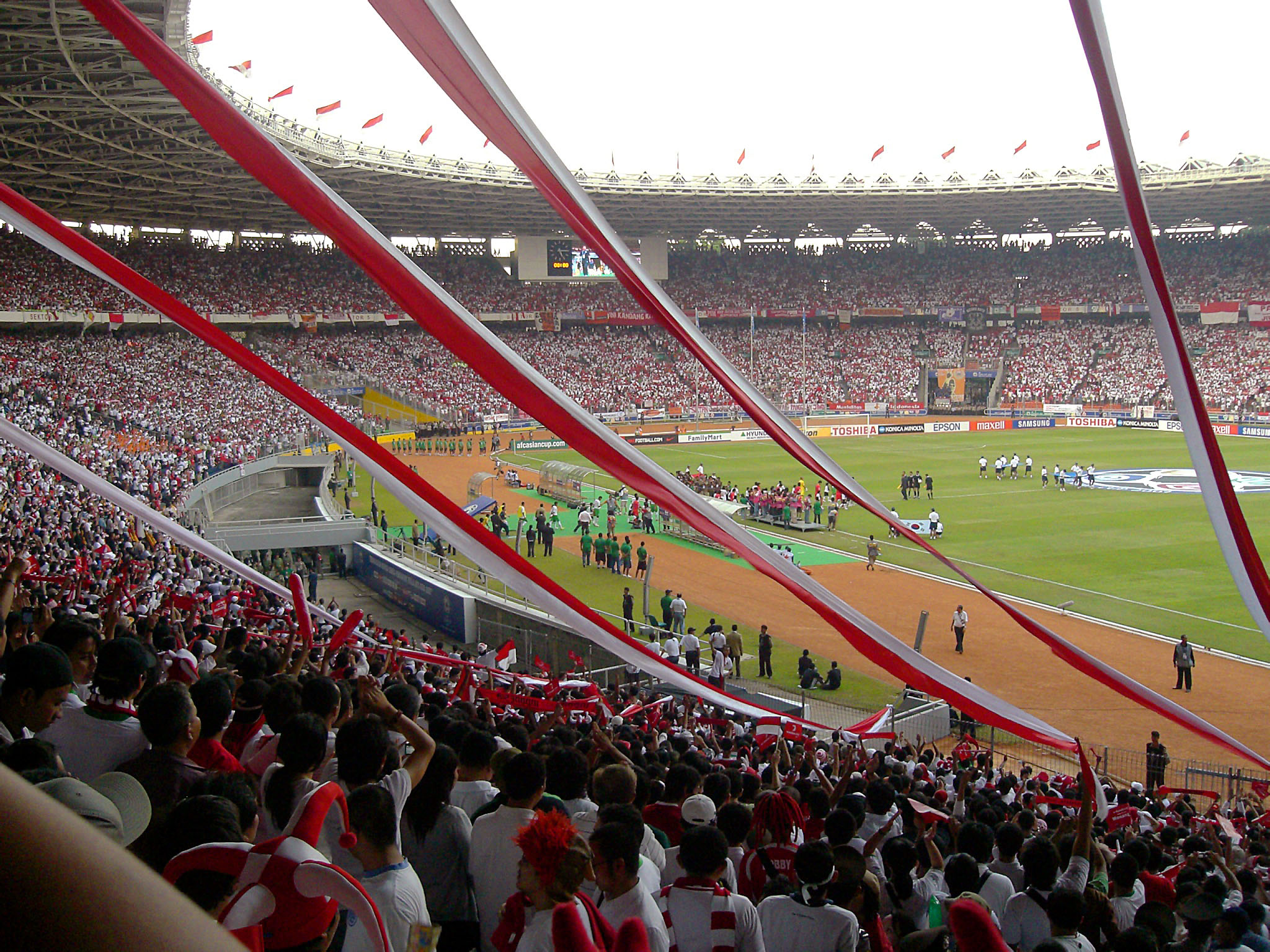
The stadium during the 2007 AFC Asian Cup

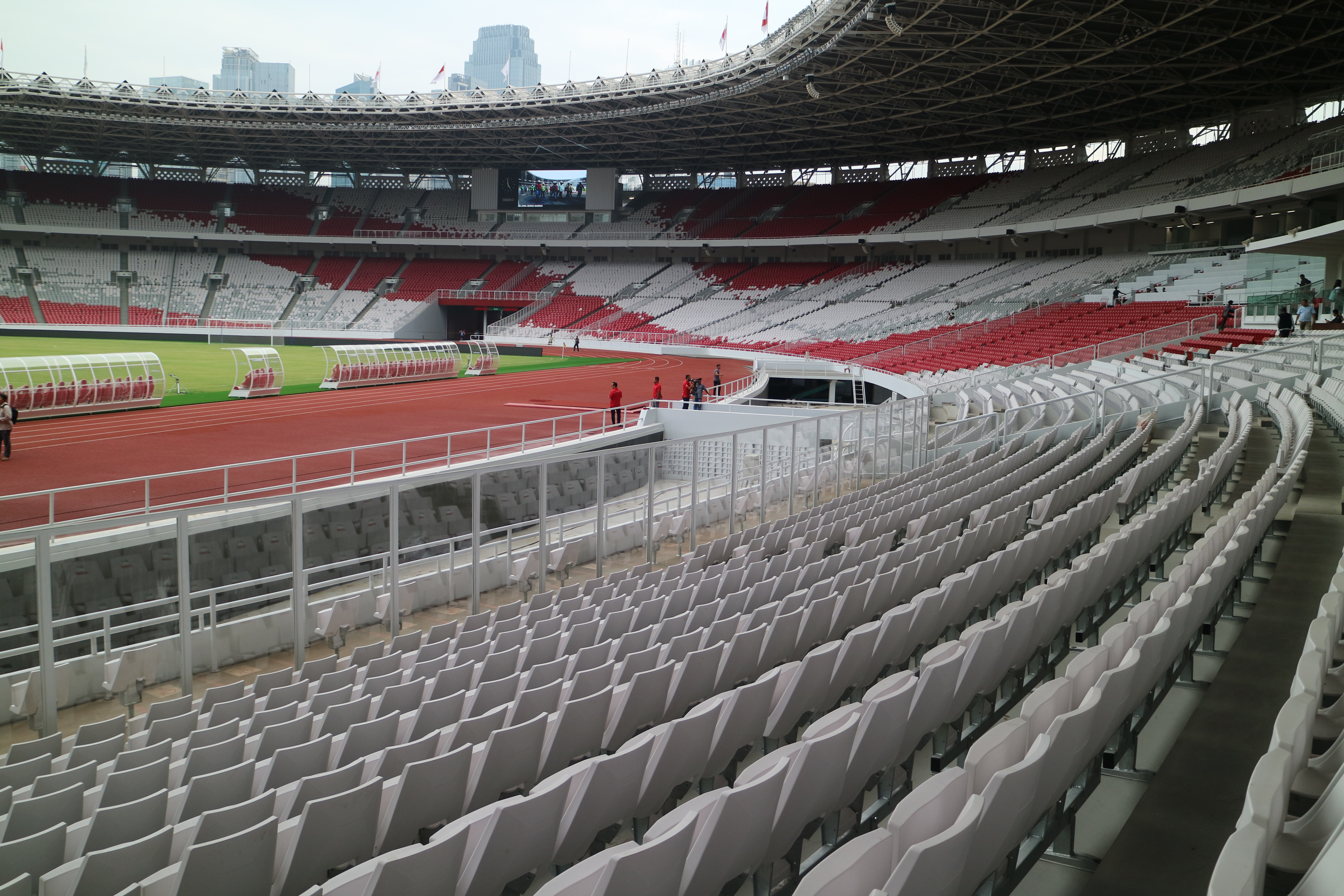
The stadium with new seats, January 2018

Under reformation regime, the complex name was reverted by President Abdurrahman Wahid in a decree effective since 17 January 2001. The stadium's capacity was then reduced further to 88,306 as a result of renovations for the 2007 AFC Asian Cup.

The stadium served as the main venue of the 2018 Asian Games and Asian Para Games, hosting the ceremonies and athletics. It underwent renovations in preparation for the events; to comply with FIFA standards, all of the stadium's existing seating was replaced, including its remaining bleachers, making it an all-seater with a capacity of 77,193. The new seats are coloured in red, white, and grey—resembling a waving flag of Indonesia. A new, brighter LED lighting system was also installed, with 620 fixtures, and an RGB lighting system was installed on the stadium's facade. Improvements were also made to the stadium's accessibility. The 2016–18 renovation of this stadium cost Rp769,69 billion (around US$59 million with 2016 exchange rate).

== Sporting events ==
GBK Stadium hosted the 2007 Asian Cup final between Iraq and Saudi Arabia. Other competitions held there include several AFF Cup finals, domestic cup finals, Liga 2 Playoff and Finals, and Liga Nusantara Playoff and Finals.

=== International ===
- Host of the 1962 and 2018 Asian Games
- Host of the 2018 Asian Para Games
- Host of the 1963 GANEFO
- Host of the Olaria Atlético Clube 1970
- Host of the Santos exhibition 1972
- Host of the Muhammad Ali vs. Rudie Lubbers boxing match, October 20, 1973.
- Host of Southeast Asian Games (in 1979, 1987, 1997, and 2011)
- Host of the Asian Athletics Championships (in 1985, 1995, and 2000)
- Host of the 2002 AFF Championship for 9 out of 10 Group A matches, semi-final matches, third place play-off, and the final.
- Host of the 2003 ASEAN Club Championship.
- Host of the 2004 AFF Championship first leg semi-final match against Malaysia and first leg final match against Singapore.
- Host of the 2007 AFC Asian Cup for 5 out of 6 Group D matches, quarterfinals between Saudi Arabia and Uzbekistan, and the final.
- Host of the 2008 AFF Championship for first leg semi-final match against Thailand
- Host of matches in the 2010 AFC Champions League competition with Persipura Jayapura and Persija Jakarta in 2018 and 2019 AFC Cup matches
- Host for the Bayern Munich 2008 Post-season Tour
- Host of the 2010 AFF Championship for 5 out of 6 Group A matches, semifinal matches against the Philippines, and second leg final match against Malaysia
- Host for the LA Galaxy 2011 Asia-Pacific Post-season Tour
- Host for all 2 matches of the Inter Milan 2012 Post-season Tour
- Host for the Valencia 2012 Asia Pre-season Tour (their only match outside Europe)
- Host for the Arsenal 2013 Asia Pre-season Tour
- Host for the Liverpool 2013 Asia Pre-season Tour
- Host for the Chelsea 2013 Asia Pre-season Tour
- Host for the Juventus 2014 Asia Pre-season Tour
- Host of the 2014 Asian Dream Cup against Park Ji-sung and Friends, featuring footballers and celebrities, including the cast of Running Man.
- Host for the AS Roma 2015 Asia Pre-season Tour
- Host of the 2018 AFC U-19 Championship
- Host of Indonesia's home matches at the 2018 AFF Championship
- Host of Indonesia's home matches at the 2022 AFF Championship
- Host for the Argentina 2023 Asian-season Tour
- Host of the 2025 ASEAN U-23 Championship
- Host of the 2026 FIFA ASEAN Cup

== Tournament results ==
=== 1979 SEA Games ===
Date	Time (UTC+07)	Team #1	Res.	Team #2	Round	Attendance
22 September 1979		Indonesia	3–0	Singapore	Group stage	N/A
23 September 1979		Thailand	1–0	Burma	Group stage	N/A
23 September 1979		Singapore	0–2	Malaysia	Group stage	N/A
23 September 1979		Indonesia	1–3	Thailand	Group stage	N/A
25 September 1979		Malaysia	0–0	Burma	Group stage	N/A
25 September 1979		Singapore	2–2	Thailand	Group stage	N/A
26 September 1979		Burma	1–2	Singapore	Group stage	N/A
26 September 1979		Indonesia	0–0	Malaysia	Group stage	N/A
28 September 1979		Malaysia	1–0	Thailand	Group stage	N/A
28 September 1979		Indonesia	2–1	Burma	Group stage	N/A
29 September 1979		Indonesia	0–0 (3–1 p)	Thailand	Second place play-off	N/A
30 September 1979		Indonesia	0–1	Malaysia	Gold medal match	85,000

=== 1987 SEA Games ===
Date	Time (UTC+07)	Team #1	Res.	Team #2	Round	Attendance
10 September 1987		Singapore	0–0	Malaysia	Group stage	N/A
10 September 1987		Thailand	3–1	Brunei	Group stage	N/A
12 September 1987		Malaysia	2–2	Burma	Group stage	N/A
12 September 1987		Indonesia	2–0	Brunei	Group stage	N/A
14 September 1987		Singapore	0–0	Burma	Group stage	N/A
14 September 1987		Indonesia	0–0	Thailand	Group stage	N/A
16 September 1987		Thailand	0–2	Malaysia	Semi-finals	N/A
17 September 1987		Indonesia	4–1	Burma	Semi-finals	75,000
19 September 1987		Thailand	4–0	Burma	Bronze medal match	N/A
20 September 1987		Indonesia	1–0 (a.e.t.)	Malaysia	Gold medal match	120,000

=== 1997 SEA Games ===
Date	Time (UTC+07)	Team #1	Res.	Team #2	Round	Attendance
5 October 1997		Vietnam	0–1	Malaysia	Group stage	N/A
5 October 1997		Indonesia	5–2	Laos	Group stage	N/A
7 October 1997		Malaysia	4–0	Philippines	Group stage	N/A
7 October 1997		Indonesia	2–2	Vietnam	Group stage	N/A
9 October 1997		Laos	4–1	Philippines	Group stage	N/A
9 October 1997		Indonesia	4–0	Malaysia	Group stage	N/A
12 October 1997		Indonesia	2–0	Philippines	Group stage	N/A
12 October 1997		Vietnam	2–1	Laos	Group stage	N/A
14 October 1997		Vietnam	3–0	Philippines	Group stage	N/A
14 October 1997		Laos	1–0	Malaysia	Group stage	N/A
16 October 1997		Thailand	2–1	Vietnam	Semi-finals	N/A
16 October 1997		Indonesia	2–1	Singapore	Semi-finals	N/A
18 October 1997		Vietnam	1–0	Singapore	Bronze medal match	N/A
18 October 1997		Indonesia	1–1 (a.e.t.) (2–4 p)	Thailand	Gold medal match	110,000

=== 2002 AFF Championship ===
Date	Time (UTC+07)	Team #1	Res.	Team #2	Round	Attendance
15 December 2002	17:05	Indonesia	0–0	Myanmar	Group stage	40,000
15 December 2002	19:35	Vietnam	9–2	Cambodia	Group stage	N/A
17 December 2002	16:05	Philippines	1–6	Myanmar	Group stage	N/A
17 December 2002	18:35	Cambodia	2–4	Indonesia	Group stage	20,000
19 December 2002	16:05	Myanmar	5–0	Cambodia	Group stage	N/A
19 December 2002	18:35	Vietnam	4–1	Philippines	Group stage	N/A
21 December 2002	16:05	Cambodia	1–0	Philippines	Group stage	N/A
21 December 2002	18:35	Indonesia	2–2	Vietnam	Group stage	30,000
23 December 2002	18:35	Philippines	1–13	Indonesia	Group stage	50,340
27 December 2002	16:00	Vietnam	0–4	Thailand	Semi-finals	N/A
27 December 2002	19:00	Malaysia	0–1	Indonesia	Semi-finals	50,000
29 December 2002	16:00	Vietnam	2–1	Malaysia	Third place play-off	N/A
29 December 2002	19:00	Thailand	2–2 (a.e.t.) (4–2 p)	Indonesia	Final	100,000

=== 2004 AFF Championship ===
Date	Time (UTC+07)	Team #1	Res.	Team #2	Round	Attendance
28 December 2004	19:45	Indonesia	1–2	Malaysia	Semi-finals first leg	N/A
8 January 2005	19:45	Indonesia	1–3	Singapore	Finals first leg	N/A

=== 2007 AFC Asian Cup ===
Date	Time (UTC+07)	Team #1	Res.	Team #2	Round	Attendance
10 July 2007	17:15	Indonesia	2–1	Bahrain	Group D	60,000
11 July 2007	19:30	South Korea	1–1	Saudi Arabia	Group D	15,000
14 July 2007	19:30	Saudi Arabia	2–1	Indonesia	Group D	88,000
15 July 2007	19:30	Bahrain	2–1	South Korea	Group D	9,000
18 July 2007	17:15	Indonesia	0–1	South Korea	Group D	88,000
22 July 2007	20:15	Saudi Arabia	2–1	Uzbekistan	Quarter-finals	12,000
29 July 2007	19:30	Iraq	1–0	Saudi Arabia	Final	60,000

=== 2008 AFF Championship ===
Date	Time (UTC+07)	Team #1	Res.	Team #2	Round	Attendance
5 December 2008	17:00	Singapore	5–0	Cambodia	Group stage	18,000
5 December 2008	19:30	Indonesia	3–0	Myanmar	Group stage	40,000
7 December 2008	17:00	Singapore	3–1	Myanmar	Group stage	21,000
7 December 2008	19:30	Cambodia	0–4	Indonesia	Group stage	30,000
9 December 2008	19:30	Indonesia	0–2	Singapore	Group stage	50,000
16 December 2008	19:00	Indonesia	0–1	Thailand	Semi-finals first leg	70,000

=== 2010 AFF Championship ===
Date	Time (UTC+07)	Team #1	Res.	Team #2	Round	Attendance
1 December 2010	17:00	Thailand	2–2	Laos	Group stage	N/A
1 December 2010	19:30	Indonesia	5–1	Malaysia	Group stage	62,000
4 December 2010	17:00	Thailand	0–0	Malaysia	Group stage	N/A
4 December 2010	19:30	Laos	0–6	Indonesia	Group stage	N/A
7 December 2010	19:30	Indonesia	2–1	Thailand	Group stage	65,000
16 December 2010	19:00	Philippines	0–1	Indonesia	Semi-finals first leg	70,000
19 December 2010	19:00	Indonesia	1–0	Philippines	Semi-finals second leg	88,000
29 December 2010	19:00	Indonesia	2–1	Malaysia	Finals second leg	88,000

=== 2011 SEA Games ===
Date	Time (UTC+07)	Team #1	Res.	Team #2	Round	Attendance
3 November 2011	16:00	Vietnam	3–1	Philippines	Group stage	N/A
3 November 2011	19:00	Laos	2–3	Myanmar	Group stage	N/A
7 November 2011	16:00	Singapore	0–0	Malaysia	Group stage	N/A
7 November 2011	19:00	Indonesia	6–0	Laos	Group stage	N/A
9 November 2011	16:00	Malaysia	2–1	Thailand	Group stage	N/A
9 November 2011	19:00	Cambodia	1–2	Singapore	Group stage	N/A
11 November 2011	14:00	Singapore	0–2	Indonesia	Group stage	N/A
11 November 2011	17:00	Thailand	4–0	Cambodia	Group stage	N/A
13 November 2011	16:00	Malaysia	4–1	Cambodia	Group stage	N/A
13 November 2011	19:00	Indonesia	3–1	Thailand	Group stage	N/A
17 November 2011	16:00	Thailand	0–2	Singapore	Group stage	N/A
17 November 2011	19:00	Indonesia	0–1	Malaysia	Group stage	N/A
19 November 2011	16:00	Malaysia	1–0	Myanmar	Semi-finals	N/A
19 November 2011	19:00	Vietnam	0–2	Indonesia	Semi-finals	N/A
21 November 2011	16:00	Myanmar	4–1	Vietnam	Bronze medal match	N/A
21 November 2011	19:30	Malaysia	1–1 (a.e.t.) (4–3 p)	Indonesia	Gold medal match	N/A

=== 2018 AFC U-19 Championship ===
Date	Time (UTC+07)	Team #1	Result	Team #2	Round	Attendance
18 October 2018	16:00	United Arab Emirates	2–1	Qatar	Group stage	2,124
18 October 2018	19:00	Indonesia	3–1	Chinese Taipei	Group stage	17,320
21 October 2018	16:00	Chinese Taipei	1–8	United Arab Emirates	Group stage	4,781
21 October 2018	19:00	Qatar	6–5	Indonesia	Group stage	38,217
24 October 2018	19:00	Indonesia	1–0	United Arab Emirates	Group stage	30,022
28 October 2018	16:00	Qatar	7–3 (a.e.t.)	Thailand	Quarter-finals	16,758
28 October 2018	19:30	Japan	2–0	Indonesia	Quarter-finals	60,154

=== 2018 AFF Championship ===
Date	Time (UTC+07)	Team #1	Result	Team #2	Round	Attendance
13 November 2018	19:00	Indonesia	3–1	Timor-Leste	Group stage	15,138
25 November 2018	19:00	Indonesia	0–0	Philippines	Group stage	15,436

=== 2022 AFF Championship ===
Date	Time (UTC+07)	Team #1	Result	Team #2	Round	Attendance
23 December 2022	16:30	Indonesia	2–1	Cambodia	Group stage	25,332
29 December 2022	16:30	Indonesia	1–1	Thailand	Group stage	49,985
6 January 2023	16:30	Indonesia	0–0	Vietnam	Semi-finals first leg	49,595

=== 2025 ASEAN U-23 Championship ===
Date	Time (UTC+07)	Team #1	Result	Team #2	Round	Attendance
15 July 2025	17:00	Malaysia	0–2	Philippines	Group stage	
15 July 2025	20:00	Indonesia	8–0	Brunei	Group stage	2,743
18 July 2025	17:00	Brunei	1–7	Malaysia	Group stage	
18 July 2025	20:00	Philippines	0–1	Indonesia	Group stage	8,409
21 July 2025	20:00	Indonesia	0–0	Malaysia	Group stage	27,013
22 July 2025	20:00	Vietnam	2–1	Cambodia	Group stage	
25 July 2025	16:00	Vietnam	2–1	Philippines	Semi-finals	
25 July 2025	20:00	Indonesia	1–1 (a.e.t.) (7–6 p)	Thailand	Semi-finals	10,771
28 July 2025	20:00	Philippines	1–3	Thailand	Third place play-off	
29 July 2025	20:00	Vietnam	1–0	Indonesia	Final	35,592

=== 2026 FIFA ASEAN Cup ===
Date	Time (UTC+07)	Team #1	Result	Team #2	Round	Attendance
25 September 2026	16:00	Bangladesh	0–3	Malaysia	Group stage	
25 September 2026	20:00	Indonesia	2–0	Singapore	Group stage	38,702
28 September 2026	16:00	Singapore	1–0	Bangladesh	Group stage	
28 September 2026	19:30	Malaysia	0–0	Indonesia	Group stage	56,894
1 October 2026	19:30	Indonesia	9–2	Bangladesh	Group stage	33,595
5 October 2026	16:00	Malaysia	1–0	Vietnam	Bronze final	
5 October 2026	20:00	Indonesia	2–2 (a.e.t.) (4–2 p)	Thailand	Final	70,098

== Other uses ==
Note: (Note: Political campaigns and religion events)

- The Grand Catholic mass led by Pope Paul VI, on 3 December 1970; Pope John Paul II, on 9 October 1989 and Pope Francis on 5 September 2024.
- The 100th anniversary of Indonesian National Awakening day, 20 May 2008
- The political rally for both parliamentary and also presidential elections in 2004, 2009, 2014, 2019, and 2024. The 2019 final day campaign for both presidential candidates was held in this stadium. The final campaign was held on 7 and 13 April 2019 respectively. Each final campaign was attended by more than 77,000 supporters, arguably the most attended a one-day campaign rally in the history of the Indonesian presidential campaign.
- Christmas event jointly organized by the Indonesian Bethel Church for the whole district (2006–2011, 2013–)
- Indonesia Tiberias Church Christmas Services (2000–2015, 2018–)
- HKBP Jubileum (147th in 2007 and 150th in 2011)
- The 85th anniversary of Nahdlatul Ulama (2011)
- Caliphate Conference of Hizb ut-Tahrir Indonesia, 6 June 2013
- Admission exams for thousands Indonesian Ministry of Health civil servants applicants on 3 November 2013
- One of the venues in Jakarta used for COVID-19 vaccination serving 60,000 doses of vaccines, 11 July 2021.

== Entertainment events ==
Kanye West concert in 2026

Date	Artists	Events	Attendance	Revenue
2 April 1972	Bee Gees	Trafalgar Tour	—	—
4 December 1975	Deep Purple	—	—	—
5 December 1975	Deep Purple	—	—	—
30 December 1988	Mick Jagger	—	70,000 / 70,000	—
21 September 2011	Linkin Park	A Thousand Suns World Tour	—	—
22 September 2012	Kangta; BoA; TVXQ; Super Junior; Super Junior-M; f(x); Shinee; Girls' Generation; Exo	SM Town Live World Tour III	50,000 / 50,000	—
9 March 2013	Super Junior; Eru; Sistar; Teen Top; 2PM; Beast; Shinee; Infinite	Music Bank World Tour	—	—
25 August 2013	Metallica	Metallica Summer Tour 2013	—	—
13 December 2013	Slank	Konser 30 Tahun Slank	—	—
23 August 2014	Super Junior-M; Noah; Mahadewa; Ungu; Kotak; Repvblik; Agnez Mo; Ayu Ting Ting; Al; El; Dul; Regina Ivanova; Fatin Shidqia; Novita Dewi; Nowela Auparay; Husein Alatas; JKT48; Bastian Steel	Mahakarya RCTI 25 Tahun	—	
25 March 2015	One Direction	On the Road Again Tour	43,032 / 43,032	$3,537,612
11 September 2015	Bon Jovi	Bon Jovi Live!	40,000 / 40,000	—
8 November 2018	Guns N' Roses	Not in This Lifetime... Tour	31,167 / 31,167	$2,504,246
23 December 2018	Slank	Konser 35 Tahun Slank	—	—
3 May 2019	Ed Sheeran	Divide Tour	48,959 / 52,060	$4,754,628
25 February 2023 (Note: Due to COVID-19 pandemic in Indonesia, Raisa Live in Concert, which was scheduled for 27 June, later 28 November 2020, was rescheduled to 25 February 2023)	Raisa	Raisa: Live in Concert	42,000 / 42,000	—
11 March 2023	Blackpink	Born Pink World Tour	113.740 / 113.740	$17.199.546
12 March 2023	Blackpink	Born Pink World Tour	113.740 / 113.740	$17.199.546
12 August 2023	Dewa 19	Dewa 19 All Stars Stadium Tour	—	—
23 September 2023	TVXQ; Super Junior; Red Velvet; NCT 127; NCT Dream; WayV; Aespa; Riize	SM Town Live 2023: SMCU Palace	50,000 / 50,000	—
15 November 2023	Coldplay	Music of the Spheres World Tour	78,541 / 78,541	$13,893,822
18 May 2024	NCT Dream	The Dream Show 3: Dream()Scape	40,000 / 40,000	—
6 September 2025 (Note: Due to a 2026 FIFA World Cup qualification match, Dewa 19 All Stars 2.0, which was scheduled for 18 January, was rescheduled to 6 September)	Dewa 19	Dewa 19 All Stars 2.0	—	—
1 November 2025	Blackpink	Deadline World Tour	—	—
2 November 2025	Blackpink	Deadline World Tour	—	—
24 October 2026	Kanye West	Ye Live Concert Tour	70,000	$18,000,000
26 December 2026	BTS	Arirang World Tour	—	—
27 December 2026	BTS	Arirang World Tour	—	—
29 December 2026	BTS	Arirang World Tour	—	—
23 January 2027	Westlife	The 25th Anniversary World Tour	—	—

=== Cancelled Entertainment Events ===
Date	Artists	Events	Reason
1 December 1993	Michael Jackson	Dangerous World Tour	Michael Jackson's health issues and rehabilitation
2 December 1993	Michael Jackson	Dangerous World Tour	Michael Jackson's health issues and rehabilitation
3 June 2012	Lady Gaga	Born This Way Ball	Security measures that were taken due to protest from several Islamic groups and community elements and Lady Gaga's appearance that did not reflect morality and Indonesian culture

== Transport ==
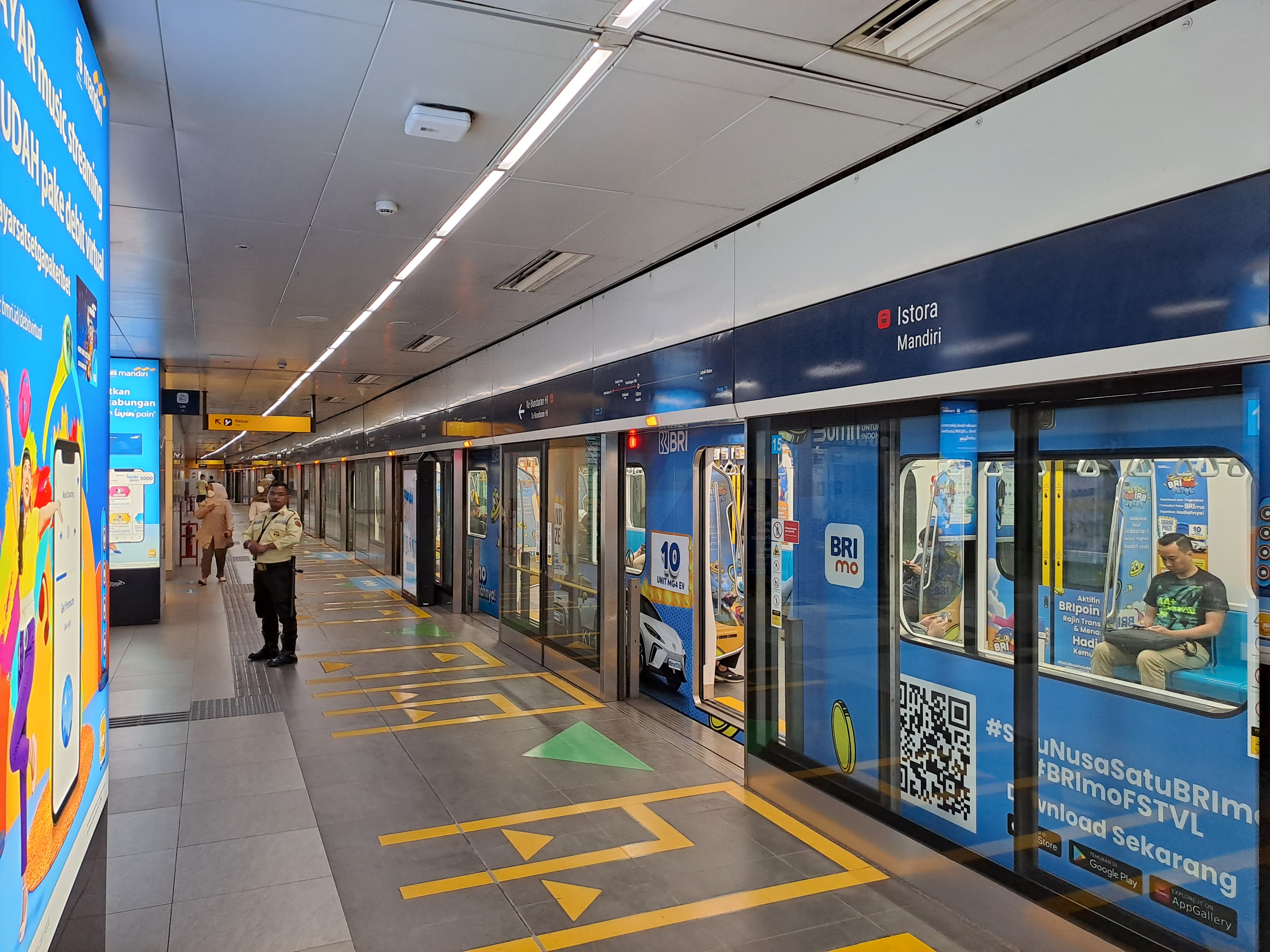
Istora Mandiri MRT station, the nearest Jakarta MRT station to the stadium complex.

KRL Commuterline provides transport service through Palmerah railway station within walking distance from the compound, while Jakarta MRT provides service through Istora Mandiri station. Two corridors of Transjakarta BRT also serve this area. An extension of the Jabodebek LRT is also planned to serve the western perimeter of the compound.

== Gallery ==
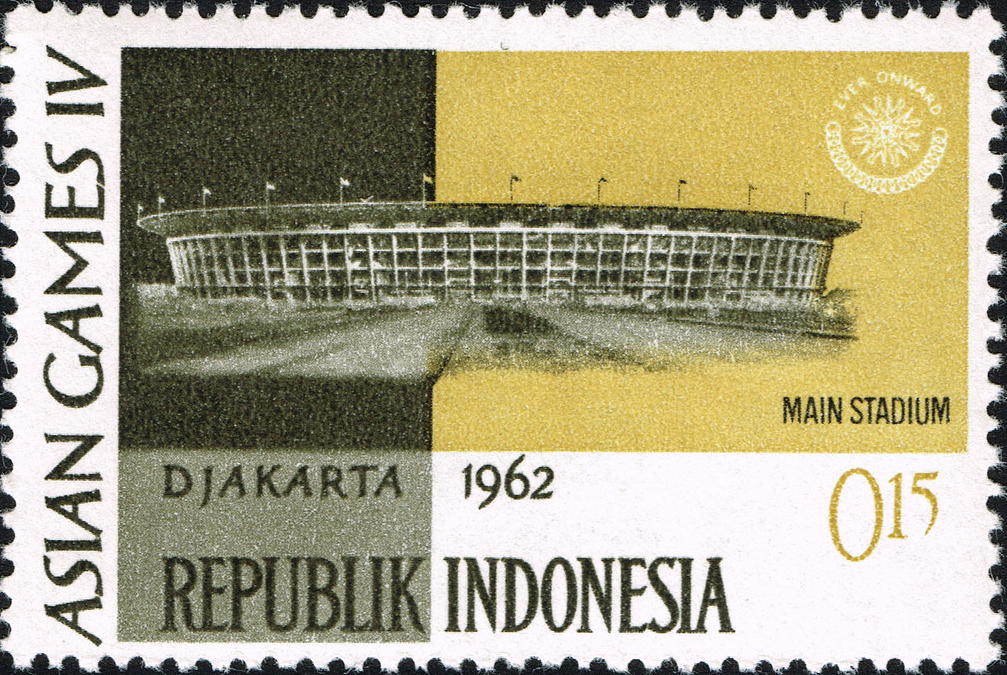
The stadium in a 1962 Asian Games commemorative stamp

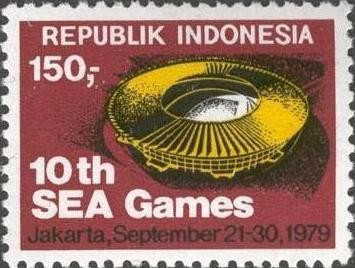
The stadium in a 1979 Southeast Asian Games commemorative stamp

Stadium in 2018

The massive roof ring structure popularly dubbed as Temu Gelang by Sukarno.

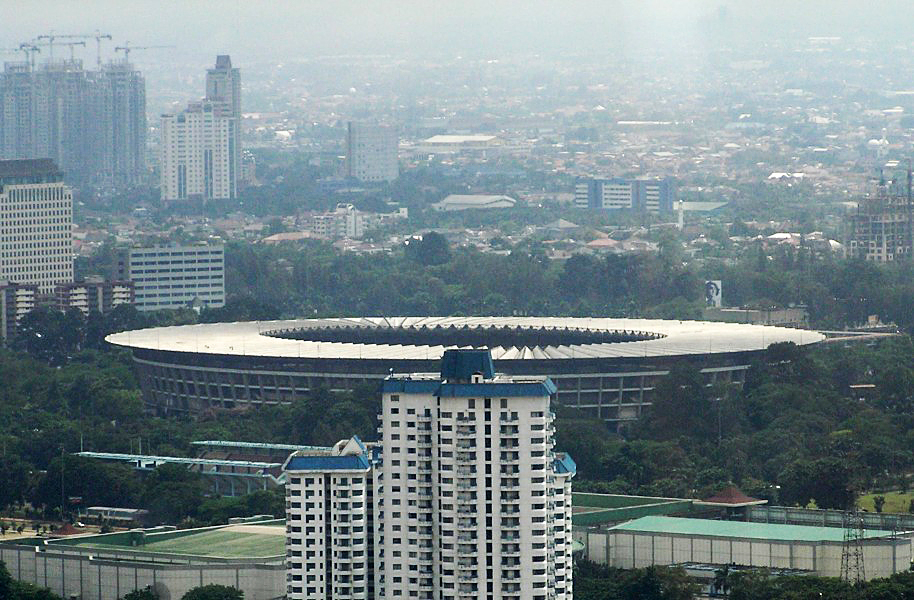
A view of the main stadium from the 46th floor of Wisma 46

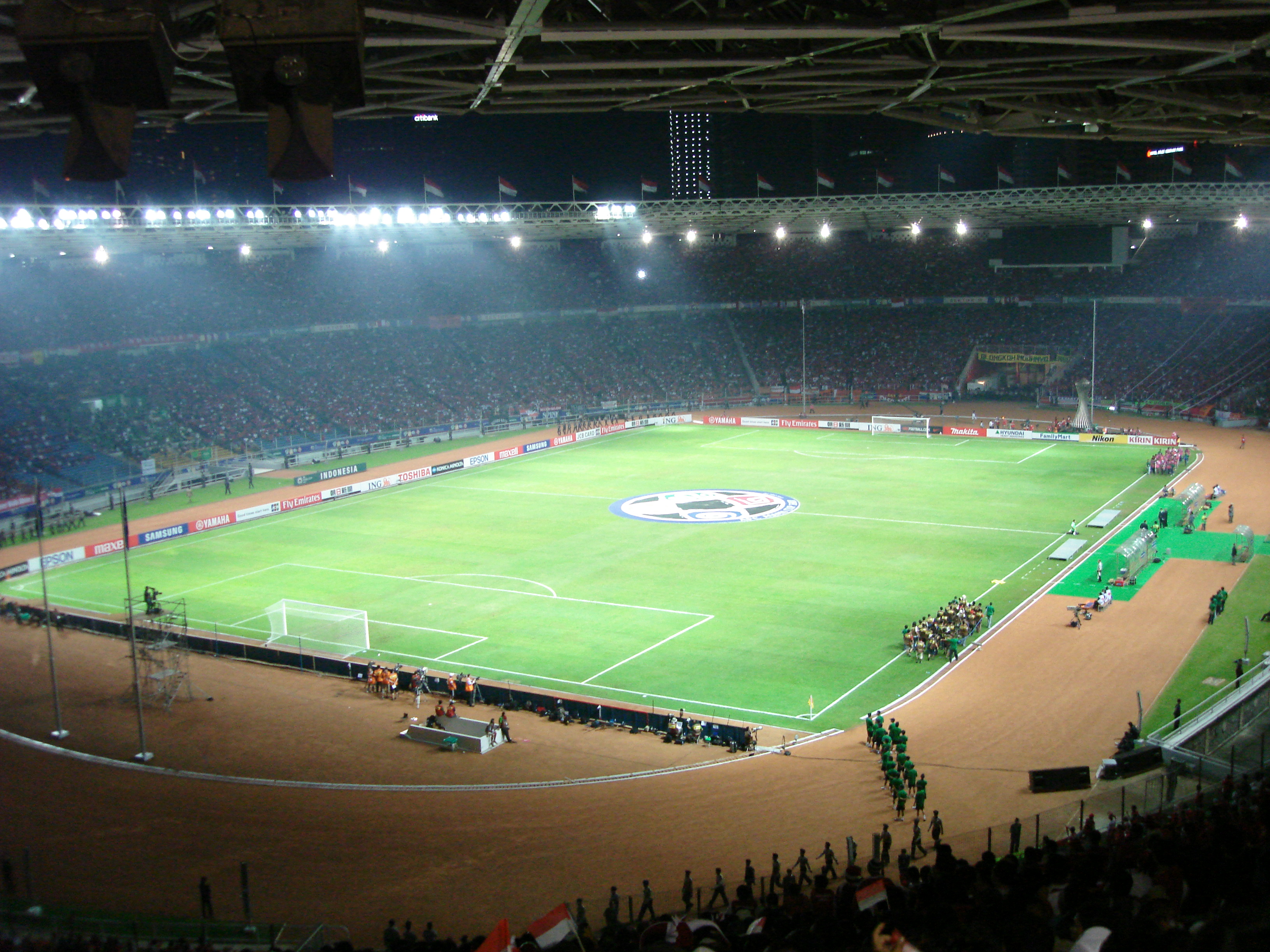
During the 2007 AFC Asian Cup (Indonesia vs Saudi Arabia)

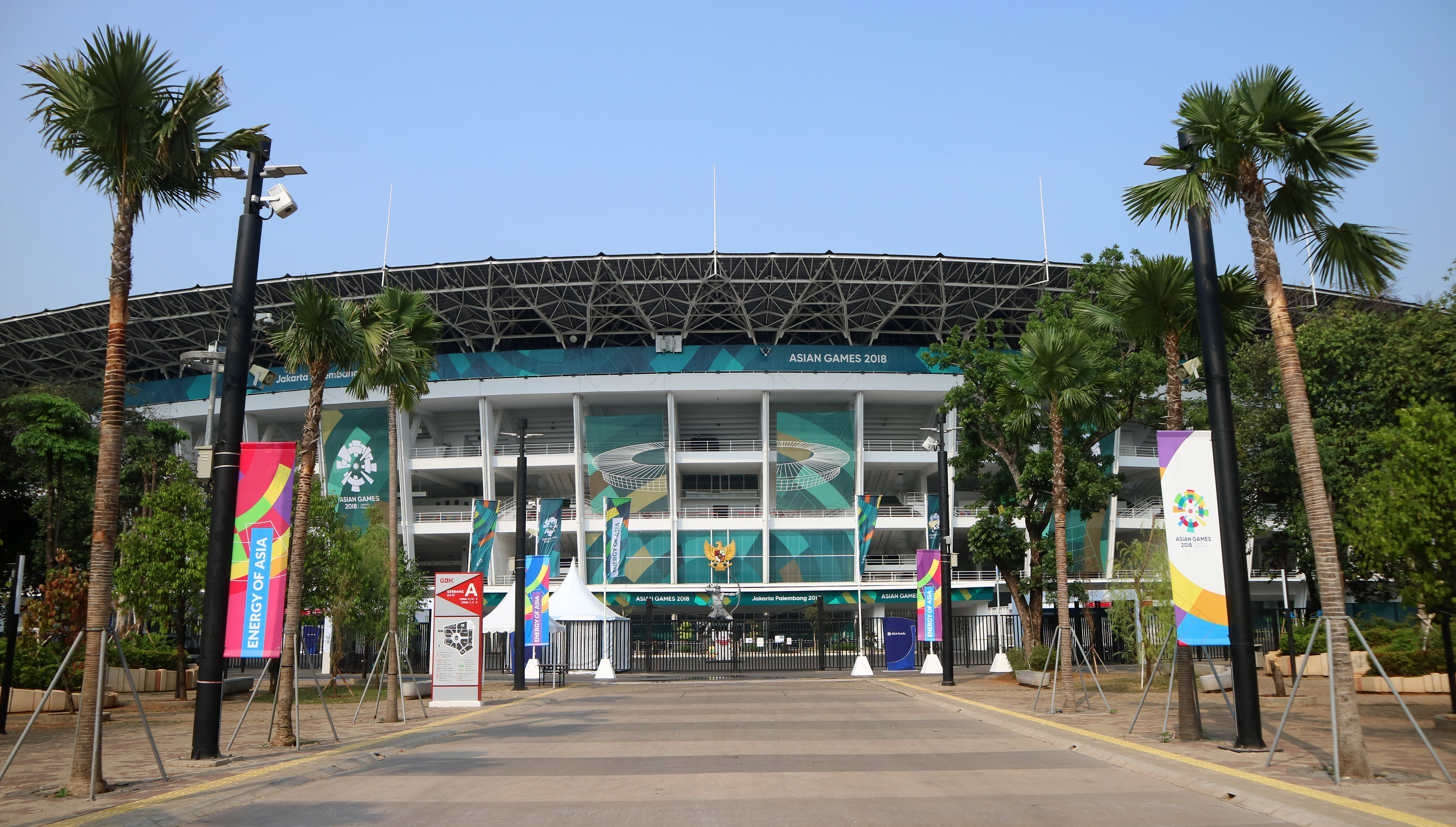
The stadium's west plaza

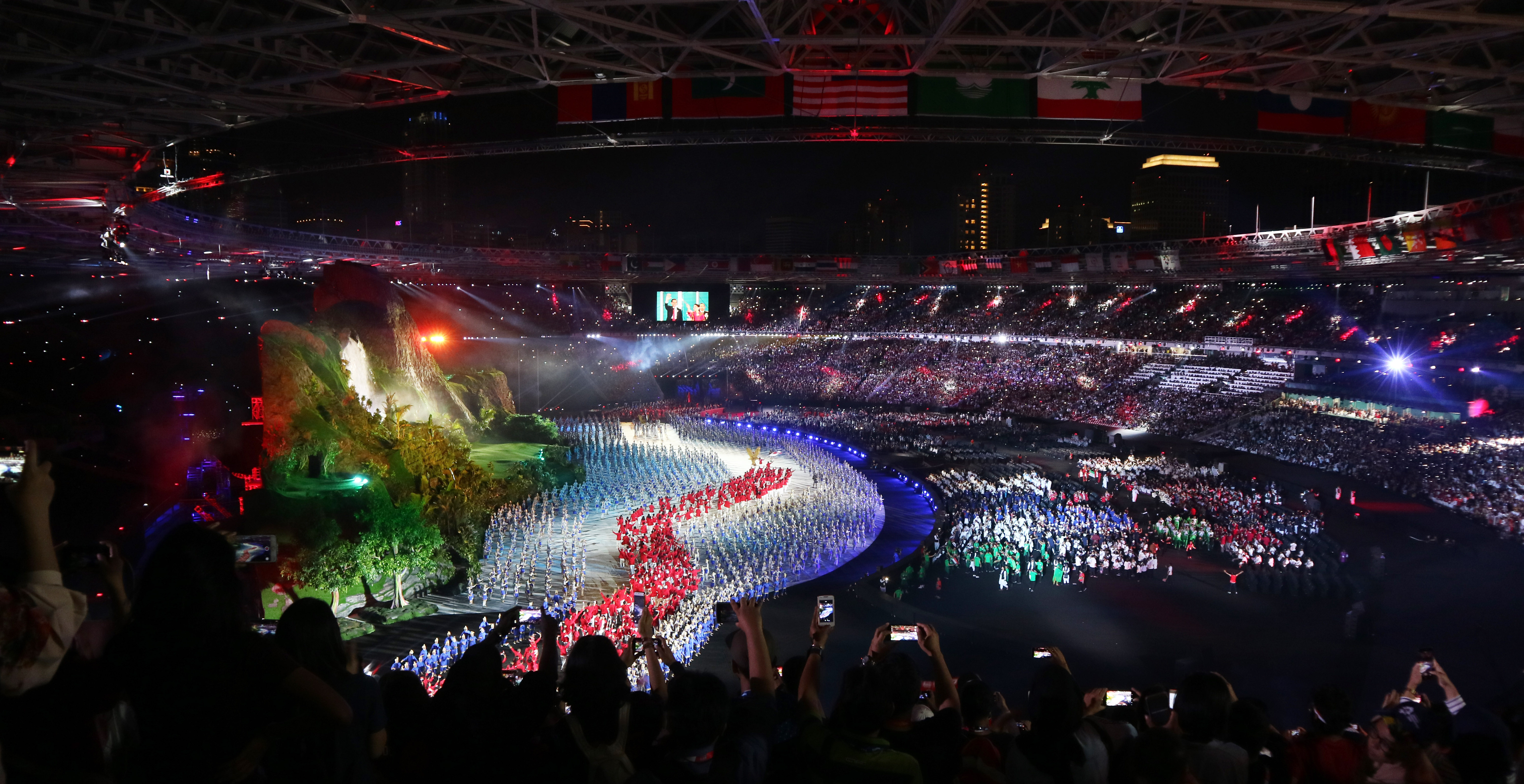
During the 2018 Asian Games opening ceremony

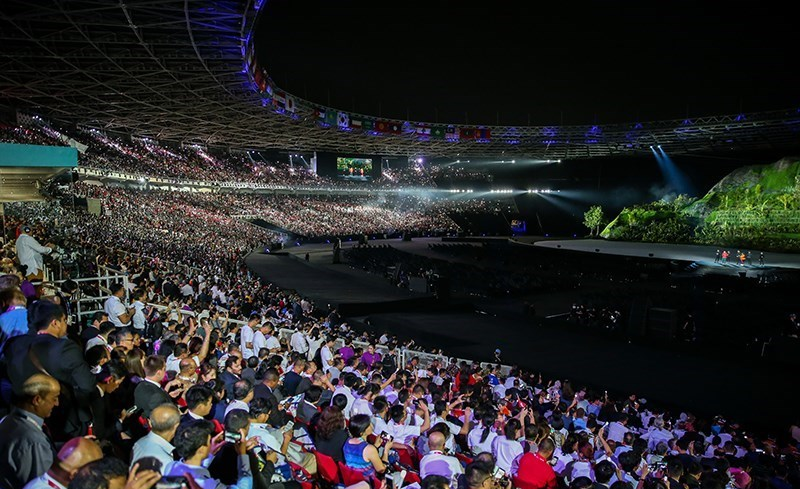
During the 2018 Asian Games opening ceremony

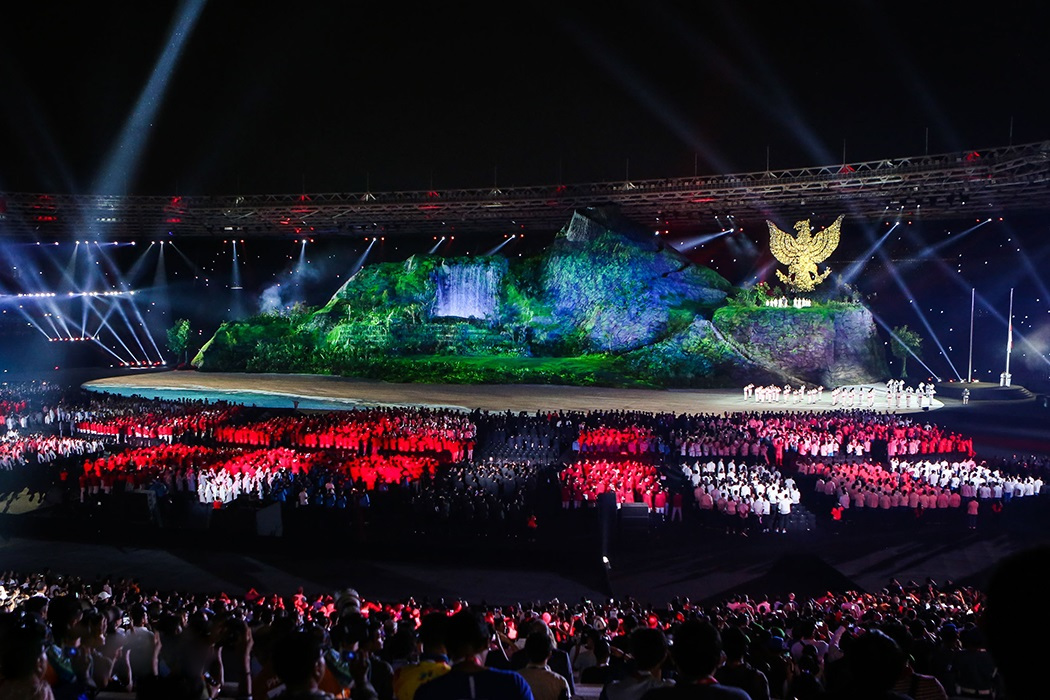
During the 2018 Asian Games opening ceremony

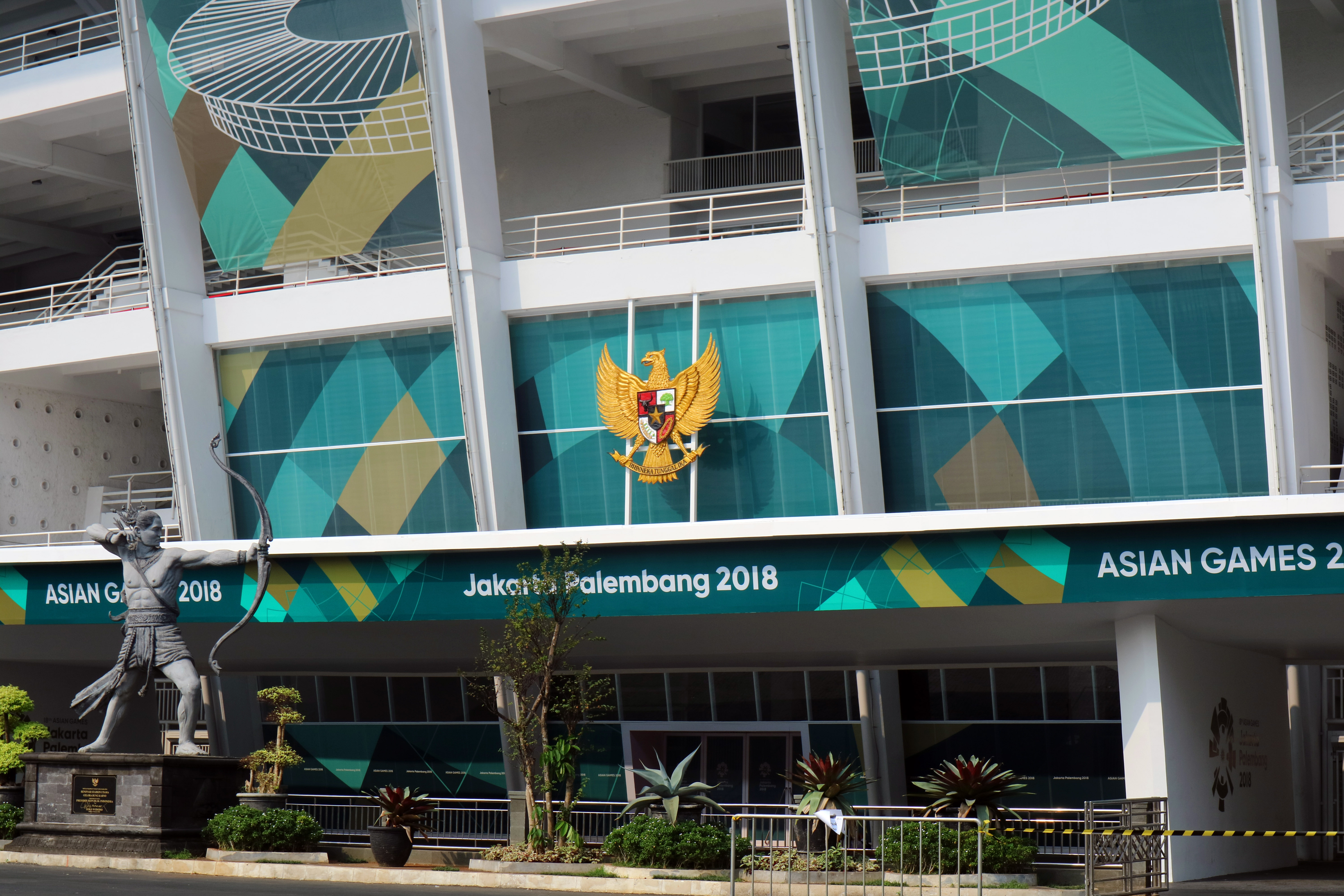
The Garuda Pancasila at the stadium

The stadium during athletics on 2018 Asian Para Games.

The spectators in the tribune during 2018 Asian Para Games athletics

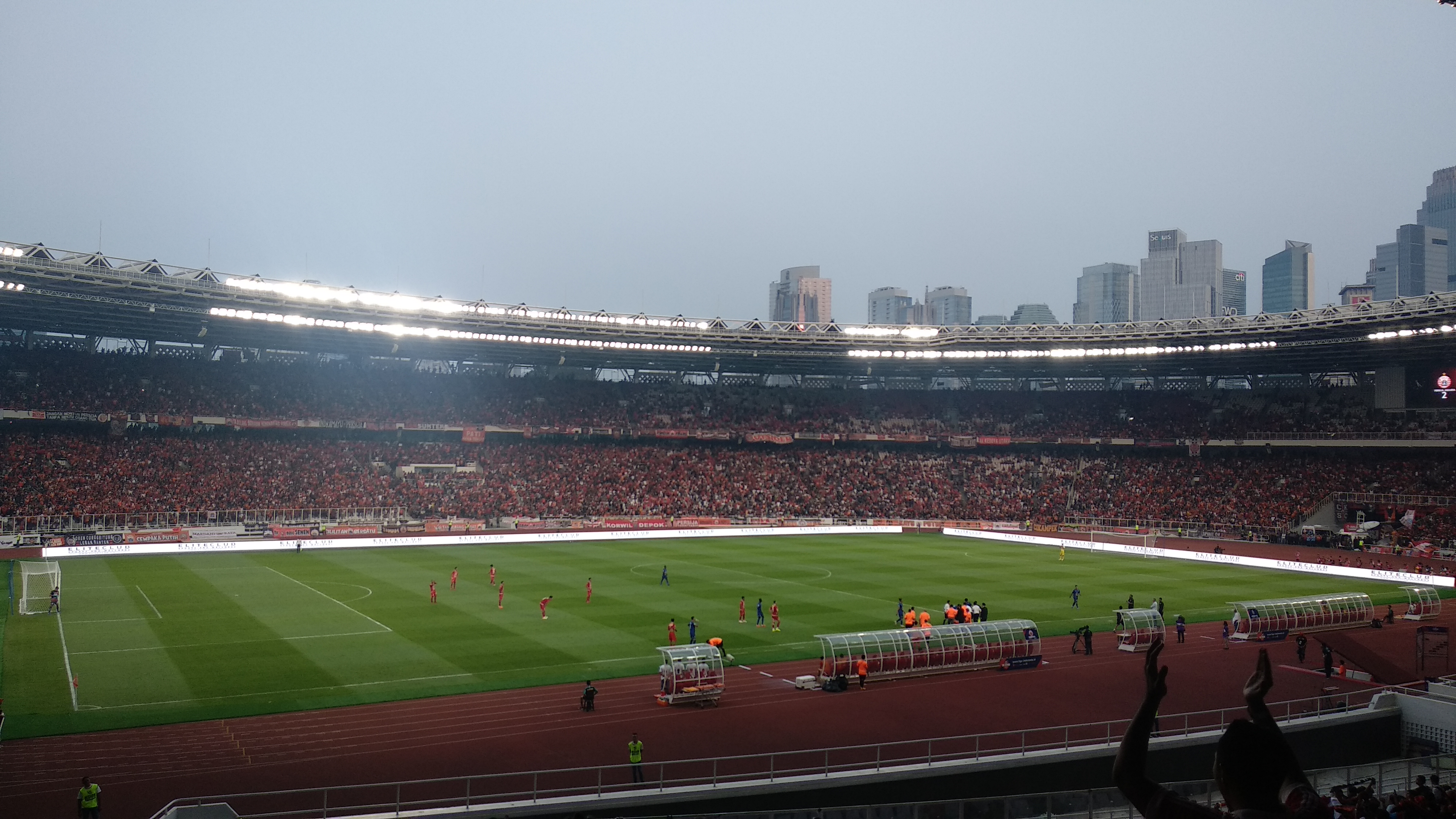
The stadium during 2019 Liga 1 match between Persija Jakarta and Arema on 3 August 2019

The stadium during the 2026 FIFA ASEAN Cup final on 5 October 2026

== See also ==
- List of stadiums by capacity
- List of Asian stadiums by capacity
- List of Southeast Asia stadiums by capacity

The complex and other venue in the complex:

- Gelora Bung Karno Sports Complex
- Gelora Bung Karno Madya Stadium
- Istora Gelora Bung Karno
- Indonesia Arena

Other stadiums in Greater Jakarta

- Jakarta International Stadium
- Patriot Chandrabhaga

Other concert venue in Jakarta:

- Beach City International Stadium
- Indonesia Convention Exhibition
- Jakarta International Expo
- Jakarta Convention Center
- The Kasablanka

== Bibliography ==
- Pour, Julius (2004), Dari Gelora Bung Karno ke Gelora Bung Karno (in Indonesian), Jakarta: Grasindo, ISBN 978-979-732-444-5.

Events and tenants
Preceded by National Stadium; Tokyo	Asian Games; Opening and closing ceremonies 1962	Succeeded by National Stadium; Bangkok
Preceded by National Stadium; Tokyo	Asian Games; Athletics tournament Main venue 1962	Succeeded by National Stadium; Bangkok
Preceded by National Stadium; Tokyo	Asian Games; Men's football tournament Final venue 1962	Succeeded by National Stadium; Bangkok
Preceded by 700th Anniversary Stadium; Chiang Mai	Southeast Asian Games; Opening and closing ceremonies 1997	Succeeded by Sultan Hassanal Bolkiah Stadium; Bandar Seri Begawan
Preceded by 700th Anniversary Stadium; Chiang Mai	Southeast Asian Games; Athletics tournament Main venue 1997	Succeeded by Sultan Hassanal Bolkiah Stadium; Bandar Seri Begawan
Preceded by 700th Anniversary Stadium; Chiang Mai	Southeast Asian Games; Men's football tournament Final venue 1997	Succeeded by Sultan Hassanal Bolkiah Stadium; Bandar Seri Begawan
Preceded by Workers' Stadium; Beijing	AFC Asian Cup; Final venue 2007	Succeeded by Khalifa International Stadium; Doha
Preceded by New Laos National Stadium; Vientiane	Southeast Asian Games; Men's football tournament Final venue 2011	Succeeded by Zayarthiri Stadium; Naypyidaw
Preceded by Incheon Asiad Main Stadium; Incheon	Asian Games; Opening and closing ceremonies 2018	Succeeded by Hangzhou Sports Park Stadium; Hangzhou
Preceded by Incheon Asiad Main Stadium; Incheon	Asian Games; Athletics tournament Main venue 2018	Succeeded by Hangzhou Sports Park Stadium; Hangzhou
Preceded by Incheon Munhak Stadium; Incheon	Asian Para Games; Opening ceremony 2018	Succeeded by Hangzhou Sports Park Stadium; Hangzhou
Preceded by Incheon Asiad Main Stadium; Incheon	Asian Para Games; Athletics tournament Main venue 2018	Succeeded by Huanglong Sports Center; Hangzhou
