= Joe Bugner =

British-Australian boxer and actor (1950–2025)

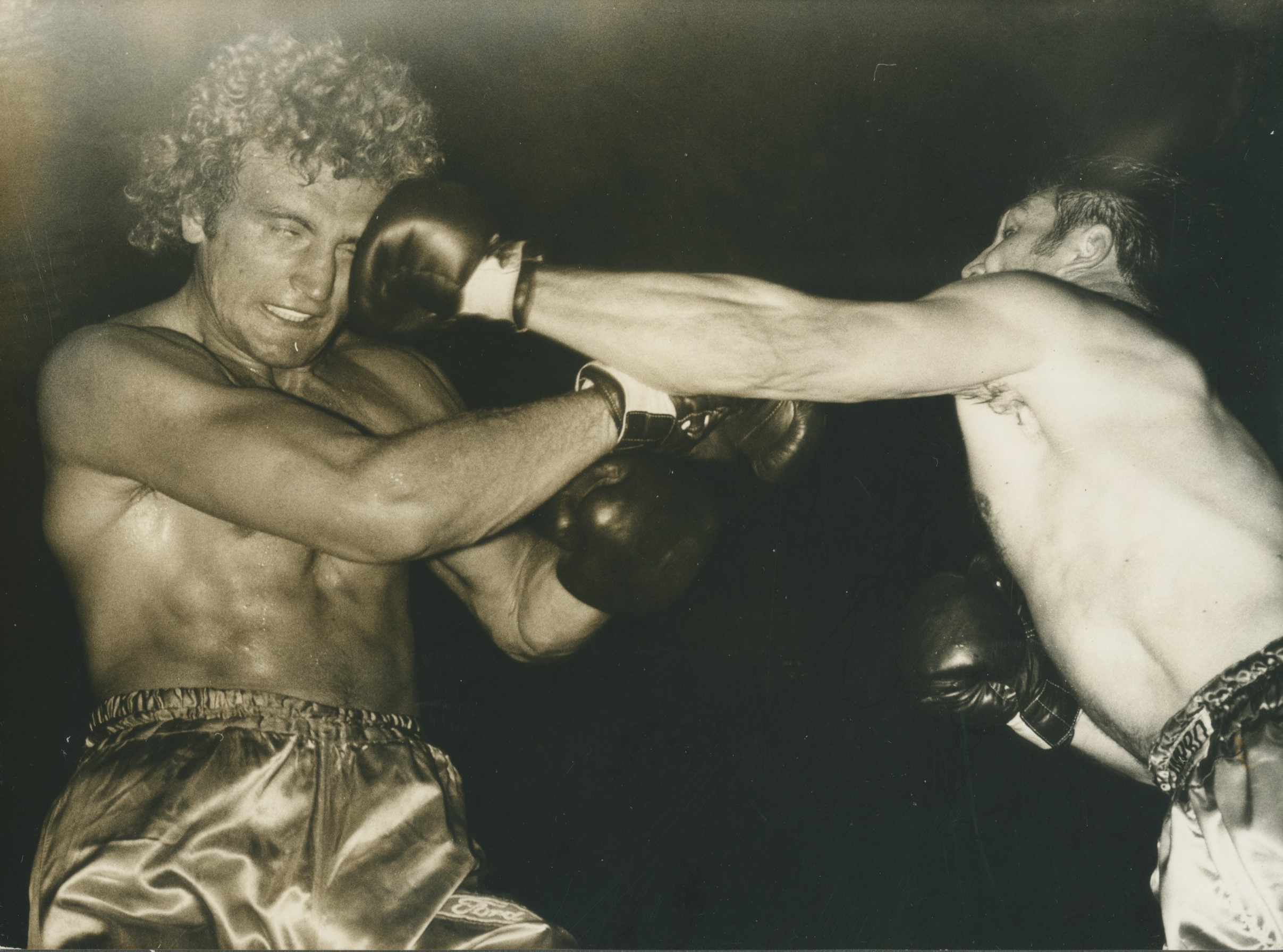
- Bugner (l) against Jack Bodell, 1971

Personal information
- Nickname: Aussie Joe
- Nationality: Hungarian; British; Australian
- Born: József Kreul Bugner; 13 March 1950 Szőreg, Hungary
- Died: 1 September 2025 (aged 75) Brisbane, Queensland, Australia
- Height: 6 ft 4 in (1.93 m)
- Weight: Heavyweight

Boxing career
- Reach: 82 in (208 cm)
- Stance: Orthodox

Boxing record
- Total fights: 83
- Wins: 69
- Win by KO: 41
- Losses: 13
- Draws: 1

József Kreul Bugner (13 March 1950 – 1 September 2025) was a Hungarian-born British–Australian professional boxer, who competed in the heavyweight division, and actor. He held triple nationality, originally being a citizen of Hungary and becoming a naturalised citizen of both the United Kingdom and Australia.

He unsuccessfully challenged Muhammad Ali for the heavyweight championship in 1975, losing by a unanimous decision. As an actor, he was often known for his villainous roles in films starring Bud Spencer and for his role in the 1994 action film Street Fighter alongside Jean-Claude Van Damme and Raul Julia.

Born in Szőreg, a southeastern suburb of Szeged in southern Hungary, Bugner and his family fled after the 1956 Soviet invasion and settled in Britain. Standing at 6 ft 4 in (1.93 m) with a prime weight of 16 stone 1lb (225 lbs or 102 kg), Bugner twice held the British and British Commonwealth heavyweight titles and was a three-time EBU European Heavyweight Champion. He was ranked among the world's top ten heavyweights of the 1970s, fighting such opponents as Muhammad Ali, Joe Frazier, Ron Lyle, Jimmy Ellis, Manuel Ramos, Chuck Wepner, Earnie Shavers, Henry Cooper, Brian London, Mac Foster, Rudi Lubbers, Eduardo Corletti, Jürgen Blin and George Johnson. The Daily Telegraph ranked him among the top ten British heavyweight boxers of all time.

Bugner retired from boxing in 1976 but made sporadic comebacks over the next two decades with varying success. He moved to Australia in 1986, adopting the nickname "Aussie Joe", defeating fighters such as Greg Page, David Bey, Anders Eklund and James Tillis before retiring again after a TKO loss to Frank Bruno in 1987. He made a final comeback during the 1990s, winning the Australian heavyweight title in 1995 and the lightly regarded World Boxing Federation (WBF) heavyweight championship in 1998 at the age of 48 against James "Bonecrusher" Smith. He retired for the last time in 1999 with a final record of 69–13–1, including 41 wins by knockout.

== Early years ==
Bugner was born in Szőreg, Hungary. His family fled to the United Kingdom in the late 1950s because of the Soviet Union's invasion of Hungary in 1956 after the Hungarian Revolution of that year. Initially, he was one of about 80 refugees housed in the students' hostel at Smedley's factory in Wisbech. They settled in the Huntingdonshire town of St Ives near the Fens. Bugner excelled in sports at school and was the national junior discus champion in 1964. He lived and trained in Bedford during his early boxing years; he was a regular at Bedford Boys Club under the training of Paul King, and attended Goldington Road School in Bedford.

== Boxing career ==
=== 1960s ===
Throughout his brief amateur career, Bugner competed sixteen times, winning thirteen matches. On the recommendation of his then-trainer and friend, Andy Smith, he became a professional in 1967 (at the young age of 17). Smith was unhappy with the choice of Bugner's opponents and believed that he could better control the quality of his opponents if Bugner turned professional. He had a losing debut against Paul Brown on 20 December 1967 at the London Hilton, where he suffered a TKO in the third round. Showing gritty determination after his debut, the teenage Bugner went on to win a remarkable 18 consecutive fights in under two years during 1968 and 1969 (including 13 stoppage victories) before narrowly losing to the older and vastly more experienced Dick Hall. He bounced back and rounded off the 1960s with three further stoppage victories.

=== 1970s ===
In 1970 Bugner emerged internationally as an outstanding young prospect and was world-rated by the end of the year. He won nine consecutive bouts that year, including victories over well-known boxers such as Chuck Wepner, Manuel Ramos, Johnny Prescott, Brian London, Eduardo Corletti, Charley Polite and George Johnson.

Bugner was now positioned to challenge world-rated Englishman Henry Cooper, who had nearly knocked out Muhammad Ali a few years previously, for Cooper's British, British Commonwealth and European titles. However, because Bugner was still too young to fight for the British Commonwealth title (the minimum age was twenty-one years old at the time), this much-anticipated bout had to be postponed until the following year. While waiting to come of age, in 1971, he defeated Carl Gizzi and drew with Bill Drover just weeks later and weeks before facing Cooper.

==== Defeat of Henry Cooper ====
In March 1971, Bugner met veteran Cooper and won a fifteen-round decision. Bugner won the bout by the slimmest of margins, 1/4 point, on the card of the lone official, Harry Gibbs. The British sporting public and press were deeply divided about the verdict. Many felt that Cooper deserved the decision due to his steady aggression. But Bugner fought effectively on the defence and often scored with his left jab. The Times, among others, scored the fight in favour of Bugner. The outcome of the bout was regarded as controversial for many years.

Nonetheless, Bugner was now the British, British Commonwealth and European champion, and for the first time, he was ranked among the world's top ten heavyweights. Bugner would remain in the world ratings for most of the 1970s.

Bugner retained his European title with a decision over tough German heavyweight Jürgen Blin. However, later in 1971, Bugner surprisingly lost decisions to underdogs Jack Bodell and Larry Middleton; sandwiched between these losses was a victory over Mike Boswell. The Bodell fight was particularly costly, depriving Bugner of his British, British Commonwealth and European championships. Bugner's relative inexperience, his youth and lack of an extensive amateur background were the chief causes of these defeats.

In 1972 Bugner won eight consecutive fights, including a knockout over Jürgen Blin for the European championship. By the end of this, Bugner demonstrated much-improved ring ability and acquired enough experience that his manager began seeking matches against the world's best heavyweights.

==== Prime years ====
Bugner began 1973 by retaining his European belt with a victory over the capable Dutchman Rudie Lubbers. The 23-year-old Bugner then lost twelve-round decisions to Muhammad Ali and Joe Frazier. Despite being clearly defeated, Bugner fought well and won the respect of the boxing media and the public alike. After their bout, Ali declared that Bugner was capable of being world champion. Ali's trainer Angelo Dundee later echoed that sentiment. The fight with Frazier in July 1973 at Earls Court in London was deemed a classic. After being knocked down by a tremendous left hook in the tenth round, Bugner arose and staggered Frazier to close the round. Frazier took the decision, but only narrowly, and arguably only George Foreman and Muhammad Ali ever gave Frazier a harder fight. Many regard the Frazier bout as being Bugner's best career performance.

After the Ali and Frazier fights, Bugner won eight bouts in a row, his most notable victories being over ex-WBA world heavyweight champion Jimmy Ellis, and Mac Foster. By the end of 1974, Bugner was rated among the top five heavyweight contenders in the world.

Bugner challenged Muhammad Ali for the world championship in June 1975, the bout being held in Kuala Lumpur, with Ali winning a relatively one-sided fifteen-round decision. Bugner performed fairly well but maintained a strictly defensive posture throughout most of the fight, perhaps due to the blistering tropical heat, and as a result, he was widely scorned by the media and public. In an interview during an April 2008 reunion with Henry Cooper, Bugner defended his tactics in the Ali fight as having been necessary due to the extreme temperature and humidity of the outside venue.

==== Regains British, European and Commonwealth titles ====
Early in 1976, Bugner announced his retirement from boxing, stating that he no longer felt motivated to fight professionally. Within months however he returned to the ring, expressing disgust at Richard Dunn's performance against Ali and in October, he defeated Richard Dunn with a first-round knockout to reclaim the British, British Commonwealth and European championships.

In 1977, Bugner lost a close twelve-round decision away from home to top contender Ron Lyle. The scores were 57–53 and 56–54 for Lyle against 55–54 for Bugner. After this bout, Bugner again retired, making only sporadic comebacks to the ring over the next decades.

=== 1980s ===
Bugner returned to the ring for brief periods in the 1980s and 1990s but was never as effective as he had been during his prime due to his age and inactivity.

After a three-year absence from the ring, Bugner returned in May 1980, knocking out fringe contender Gilberto Acuna, before promptly retiring again. In 1982, a ring-rusty Bugner (having had only one short fight in five years and weighing in some 25 lbs above his prime fighting weight) fought the hard-hitting top contender Earnie Shavers, but was stopped in the second round due to a badly cut eye. However, Bugner decided to continue his comeback, stopping the useful John Denis and fringe contender Danny Sutton, as well as domestic contenders Winston Allen and Eddie Neilson. His bout against Allen notably saw the usually lenient Bugner scoring a rare KO in the third round following repeated fouls from Allen. In 1983, a subdued and unmotivated Bugner lost to Marvis Frazier, showing little ambition throughout the bout. He followed this with a decision over future European champion Anders Eklund and a controversial loss to future world title challenger Steffen Tangstad. Bugner appeared to have done enough to win the Tangstad fight, however, like with the Frazier and Eklund bouts, he appeared unmotivated and uninterested throughout.

==== Comeback in Australia ====
In 1986 Bugner moved to Australia, where he adopted the nickname Aussie Joe after becoming an Australian citizen. In Australia, Bugner launched a fairly successful comeback, earning good victories over world title contenders James Tillis and David Bey and an impressive victory over former WBA heavyweight champion Greg Page, gaining a world ranking in the process, after which he spoke of challenging reigning heavyweight champion Mike Tyson. However, there was great clamour for a fight with fellow Briton Frank Bruno. The bout was touted as the biggest all-British heavyweight bout since Cooper Vs Bugner in 1971. The bout took place on 24 October 1987, and Bugner suffered an eighth-round TKO loss to the much younger and fresher world title contender for the Commonwealth championship in front of a huge crowd at White Hart Lane football stadium. Bugner promptly retired again following this defeat, only his third stoppage defeat in 20 years.

=== 1990s ===
Inspired by the 45-year-old George Foreman's recapture of the heavyweight title, Bugner made a final comeback in 1995, beating Vince Cervi to win the Australian heavyweight title, followed by a win over West Turner. Bugner then fought fellow Briton and world title contender Scott Welch for the WBO Intercontinental Heavyweight Title. Welch proved too young and fresh for the now 46-year-old Bugner, handing him a TKO defeat in the 6th round.

Bugner continued to fight on against far younger opponents. In 1996 he defeated the respectable Young Haumona for the Pacific and Australasian Heavyweight title, retained it against Waisiki Ligaloa in 1997, added the Australian title by defeating the tough Colin Wilson and defending both titles against Bob Mirovic in 1998.

In 1998 Bugner's long-term tenacity finally gave him a world crown – the WBF version of the heavyweight crown – by defeating former WBA World Heavyweight Champion James "Bonecrusher" Smith. At the age of 48 years and 110 days, it made Bugner the oldest ever boxer to hold a world championship belt.

Bugner fought just once more. In June 1999, at the age of 49, he defeated the durable fringe contender Levi Billups, who was disqualified for low blows.

== Fight record ==
His record for 83 professional fights is 69 wins (41 on knockouts), 13 losses and 1 draw.

In an interview in 2004, Bugner said that the hardest puncher he had ever faced was Earnie Shavers and the biggest beating he took was from Ron Lyle.

== Life outside boxing ==
After moving to Australia, Bugner and his wife, Marlene, opened a vineyard. It failed in 1989, and he lost an estimated two million Australian dollars.

Bugner worked in the film industry. During the 1970s, he appeared in one of several PSAs themed Be Smart, Be Safe; these dealt with instructing children on how to safely cross a road or a street. In 1979, Bugner featured in an Italian film, Io sto con gli ippopotami, with Bud Spencer and Terence Hill, and he worked again with Spencer throughout the 1980s. He worked as the expert adviser on the Russell Crowe film Cinderella Man, which was a film about the heavyweight boxer James J. Braddock. Bugner was dropped partway through the project, which prompted him to call Crowe "a gutless worm and a f*****g girl".

Bugner suffered from a serious back injury he sustained from training for fights in his middle years. Financial problems prompted him to re-enter the ring at such an advanced age. A benefit was held for Bugner in 2008 by Kevin Lueshing.

In November 2009, Bugner replaced Camilla Dallerup on day 4 of the British TV show I'm a Celebrity...Get Me Out of Here!. He left the show on day 16 after losing a bush tucker trial called 'Jungle Jail' to fellow celebrity Stuart Manning.

Bugner had three children: James, Joe Jr. and Amy, with his ex-wife Melody.

Bugner's autobiography, Joe Bugner – My Story, was published by New Holland Publishing (Australia) on 14 November 2013.

Bugner spent his final years with dementia and died at a care home in Brisbane, Australia, on 1 September 2025, at the age of 75.

== Boxing style ==
Bugner utilised a strong defensive style heralded by a swift left jab and spry footwork to effectively manage distance and score points. Bugner earned an early reputation as a tough and durable, albeit overly-cautious fighter. He was often criticised for a perceived lack of natural aggression in the ring, a sentiment that persisted throughout his career.

Some observers pertained Bugner's supposed lenience as being a result of an accident that occurred early in his career when opponent, Ulric Regis, died from brain injuries soon after being outpointed by Bugner at London's Shoreditch Town Hall.

== Professional boxing record ==
83 fights	69 wins	13 losses
By knockout	41	4
By decision	26	9
By disqualification	2	0
Draws	1	

No.	Result	Record	Opponent	Type	Round, time	Date	Location	Notes
83	Win	69–13–1	Levi Billups	DQ	9	13 Jun 1999	Broadbeach, Australia	
82	Win	68–13–1	James Smith	TKO	1	4 Jul 1998	Carrara, Australia	Won vacant WBF (Federation) heavyweight title
81	Win	67–13–1	Bob Mirovic	SD	12	20 Apr 1998	Carrara, Australia	Retained Australian heavyweight title; Won vacant PABA heavyweight title
80	Win	66–13–1	Colin Wilson	UD	12	13 Jan 1998	Broadbeach, Australia	Won Australian heavyweight title
79	Win	65–13–1	Waisiki Ligaloa	TKO	7	3 Jun 1997	Southport, Australia	Retained PABA heavyweight title
78	Win	64–13–1	Young Haumona	KO	5	5 Jul 1996	Carrara, Australia	Won vacant PABA heavyweight title
77	Loss	63–13–1	Scott Welch	TKO	6	16 Mar 1996	Berlin, Germany	For vacant WBO Inter-Continental heavyweight title
76	Win	63–12–1	West Turner	KO	3	2 Feb 1996	Perth, Australia	
75	Win	62–12–1	Vince Cervi	UD	12	22 Sep 1995	Carrara, Australia	Won Australian heavyweight title
74	Loss	61–12–1	Frank Bruno	TKO	8	24 Oct 1987	White Hart Lane, London	
73	Win	61–11–1	Greg Page	UD	10	24 Jul 1987	Sydney, Australia	
72	Win	60–11–1	David Bey	UD	10	14 Nov 1986	Sydney, Australia	
71	Win	59–11–1	James Tillis	PTS	10	15 Sep 1986	Sydney, Australia	
70	Loss	58–11–1	Steffen Tangstad	SD	10	18 Feb 1984	Copenhagen, Denmark	
69	Win	58–10–1	Anders Eklund	MD	10	13 Jan 1984	Randers, Denmark	
68	Loss	57–10–1	Marvis Frazier	UD	10	4 Jun 1983	Atlantic City, New Jersey	
67	Win	57–9–1	Danny Sutton	TKO	9	20 Apr 1983	Muswell Hill, London	
66	Win	56–9–1	John Dino Denis	TKO	3	16 Feb 1983	Wood Green, London	
65	Win	55–9–1	Eddie Neilson	TKO	5	9 Dec 1982	Bloomsbury, London	
64	Win	54–9–1	Winston Allen	KO	3	28 Oct 1982	Bloomsbury, London	
63	Loss	53–9–1	Earnie Shavers	TKO	2	8 May 1982	Reunion Arena, Dallas	
62	Win	53–8–1	Gilberto Acuna	TKO	6	23 Aug 1980	Inglewood, California	
61	Loss	52–8–1	Ron Lyle	SD	12	20 Mar 1977	Caesars Palace, Nevada	
60	Won	52–7–1	Richard Dunn	KO	1	12 Oct 1976	Wembley, London	Won European, British and Commonwealth heavyweight titles
59	Loss	51–7–1	Muhammad Ali	UD	15	1 Jul 1975	Merdeka Stadium, Kuala Lumpur	For, WBA, WBC and The Ring heavyweight titles
58	Win	51–6–1	Dante Cane	TKO	5	28 Feb 1975	Bologna, Italy	Retained European heavyweight title
57	Win	50–6–1	Santiago Alberto Lovell	TKO	2	3 Dec 1974	Royal Albert Hall, London	
56	Win	49–6–1	Jimmy Ellis	PTS	10	12 Nov 1974	Wembley, London	
55	Win	48–6–1	Jose Luis Garcia	KO	2	1 Oct 1974	Wembley, London	
54	Win	47–6–1	Piermario Baruzzi	TKO	10	29 May 1974	Copenhagen, Denmark	Retained European heavyweight title
53	Win	46–6–1	Pat Duncan	PTS	10	12 Mar 1974	Wembley, London	
52	Win	45–6–1	Mac Foster	PTS	10	13 Nov 1973	Wembley, London	
51	Win	44–6–1	Giuseppe Ros	PTS	15	2 Oct 1973	Royal Albert Hall, London	Retained European heavyweight title
50	Loss	43–6–1	Joe Frazier	PTS	12	2 Jul 1973	Earls Court, London	
49	Loss	43–5–1	Muhammad Ali	UD	12	14 Feb 1973	Las Vegas, Nevada	
48	Win	43–4–1	Rudie Lubbers	UD	15	16 Jan 1973	Royal Albert Hall, London	Retained European heavyweight title
47	Win	42–4–1	Dante Cane	TKO	6	28 Nov 1972	Ice Rink, Nottingham	
46	Win	41–4–1	Tony Doyle	TKO	8	14 Nov 1972	Wembley, London	
45	Win	40–4–1	Jürgen Blin	KO	8	10 Oct 1972	Royal Albert Hall, London	Won European heavyweight title
44	Win	39–4–1	Paul Nielsen	TKO	6	19 Jul 1972	Croke Park, Dublin	
43	Win	38–4–1	Doug Kirk	TKO	5	6 Jun 1972	Royal Albert Hall, London	
42	Win	37–4–1	Marc Hans	TKO	3	9 May 1972	Wembley, London	
41	Win	36–4–1	Leroy Caldwell	DQ	5	25 Apr 1972	Royal Albert Hall, London	
40	Win	35–4–1	Brian O'Melia	TKO	2	28 Mar 1972	Wembley, London	
39	Loss	34–4–1	Larry Middleton	PTS	10	24 Nov 1971	Ice Rink, Nottingham	
38	Win	34–3–1	Mike Boswell	UD	10	17 Nov 1971	Houston, Texas	
37	Loss	33–3–1	Jack Bodell	PTS	15	27 Sep 1971	Wembley, London	Lost European, British and Commonwealth heavyweight titles
36	Win	33–2–1	Jürgen Blin	PTS	15	11 May 1971	Wembley, London	Retained European heavyweight title
35	Win	32–2–1	Henry Cooper	PTS	15	16 Mar 1971	Wembley, London	Won European, British and Commonwealth heavyweight titles
34	Draw	31–2–1	Bill Drover	PTS	10	10 Feb 1971	Bethnal Green, London	
33	Win	31–2	Carl Gizzi	PTS	10	19 Jan 1971	Royal Albert Hall, London	
32	Win	30–2	Miguel Angel Paez	TKO	3	8 Dec 1970	Royal Albert Hall, London	
31	Win	29–2	George Johnson	PTS	10	3 Nov 1970	Royal Albert Hall, London	
30	Win	28–2	Hector Eduardo Corletti	PTS	10	6 Oct 1970	Royal Albert Hall, London	
29	Win	27–2	Chuck Wepner	TKO	3	8 Sep 1970	Wembley, London	
28	Win	26–2	Brian London	TKO	5	12 May 1970	Wembley, London	
27	Win	25–2	Ray Patterson	PTS	8	21 Apr 1970	Royal Albert Hall, London	
26	Win	24–2	Manuel Ramos	PTS	4	23 Mar 1970	Wembley, London	
25	Win	23–2	Roberto Davila	TKO	4	10 Feb 1970	Picadilly, London	
24	Win	22–2	Johnny Prescott	PTS	8	20 Jan 1970	Royal Albert Hall, London	
23	Win	21–2	Charley Polite	TKO	3	9 Dec 1969	Royal Albert Hall, London	
22	Win	20–2	Eddie Talhami	TKO	4	11 Nov 1969	Royal Albert Hall, London	
21	Win	19–2	Phil Smith	TKO	2	14 Oct 1969	Royal Albert Hall, London	
20	Loss	18–2	Dick Hall	PTS	8	4 Aug 1969	Hotel Piccadilly, Manchester	
19	Win	18–1	Moses Harrell	PTS	8	9 Jun 1969	Belle Vue, Manchester	
18	Win	17–1	Tony Ventura	PTS	8	20 May 1969	Royal Albert Hall, London	
17	Win	16–1	Jack O'Halloran	PTS	8	15 Apr 1969	Royal Albert Hall, London	
16	Win	15–1	Lion Ven	TKO	5	25 Mar 1969	Wembley, London	
15	Win	14–1	Ulric Regis	PTS	8	11 Mar 1969	Shoreditch, London	
14	Win	13–1	Terry Feeley	TKO	1	25 Feb 1969	Royal Albert Hall, London	
13	Win	12–1	Rudolph Vaughan	TKO	2	21 Jan 1969	Kensington, London	
12	Win	11–1	George Dulaire	TKO	4	19 Dec 1968	Bethnal Green, London	
11	Win	10–1	Gene Innocent	TKO	3	12 Nov 1968	Wembley, London	
10	Win	9–1	Paul Brown	TKO	3	4 Nov 1968	Connaught Rooms, London	
9	Win	8–1	Vic Moore	TKO	1	8 Oct 1968	Royal Albert Hall, London	
8	Win	7–1	Obe Hepburn	TKO	1	18 Aug 1968	Wembley, London	
7	Win	6–1	Paul Brown	TKO	4	28 May 1968	Royal Albert Hall, London	
6	Win	5–1	Billy Wynter	PTS	6	21 May 1968	Bethnal Green, London	
5	Win	4–1	Mick Oliver	RTD	3	6 May 1968	Mayfair, London	
4	Win	3–1	Bert Johnson	KO	3	26 Mar 1968	Bethnal Green, London	
3	Win	2–1	Jim McIlvaney	TKO	2	27 Feb 1968	Bethnal Green, London	
2	Win	1–1	Paul Cassidy	TKO	2	30 Jan 1968	Bethnal Green, London	
1	Loss	0–1	Paul Brown	KO	3	20 Dec 1967	Mayfair, London	

== Exhibition boxing record ==
2 fights	0 wins	0 losses
Non-scored	2	

No.	Result	Record	Opponent	Type	Round, time	Date	Location	Notes
2	—N/a	0–0 (2)	(United States) Muhammad Ali	—N/a	?	8 Feb 1979	Western Springs, Auckland, New Zealand	Non-scored bout
1	—N/a	0–0 (1)	(United States) Muhammad Ali	—N/a	?	3 Dec 1974	(United Kingdom) Royal Albert Hall, London, England	Non-scored bout

== Titles in boxing ==
Minor World titles

- WBF heavyweight champion (200+ lbs)

Regional/International titles

- EBU heavyweight champion (200+ lbs) (3x)
- Commonwealth heavyweight champion (200+ lbs) (2x)
- British heavyweight champion (200+ lbs) (2x)
- PABA heavyweight champion (209+ lbs)
- WBO intercontinental heavyweight champion (200+ lbs)
- Australian heavyweight champion (200+ lbs) (2x)
