= Rudi Lubbers =

Dutch boxer

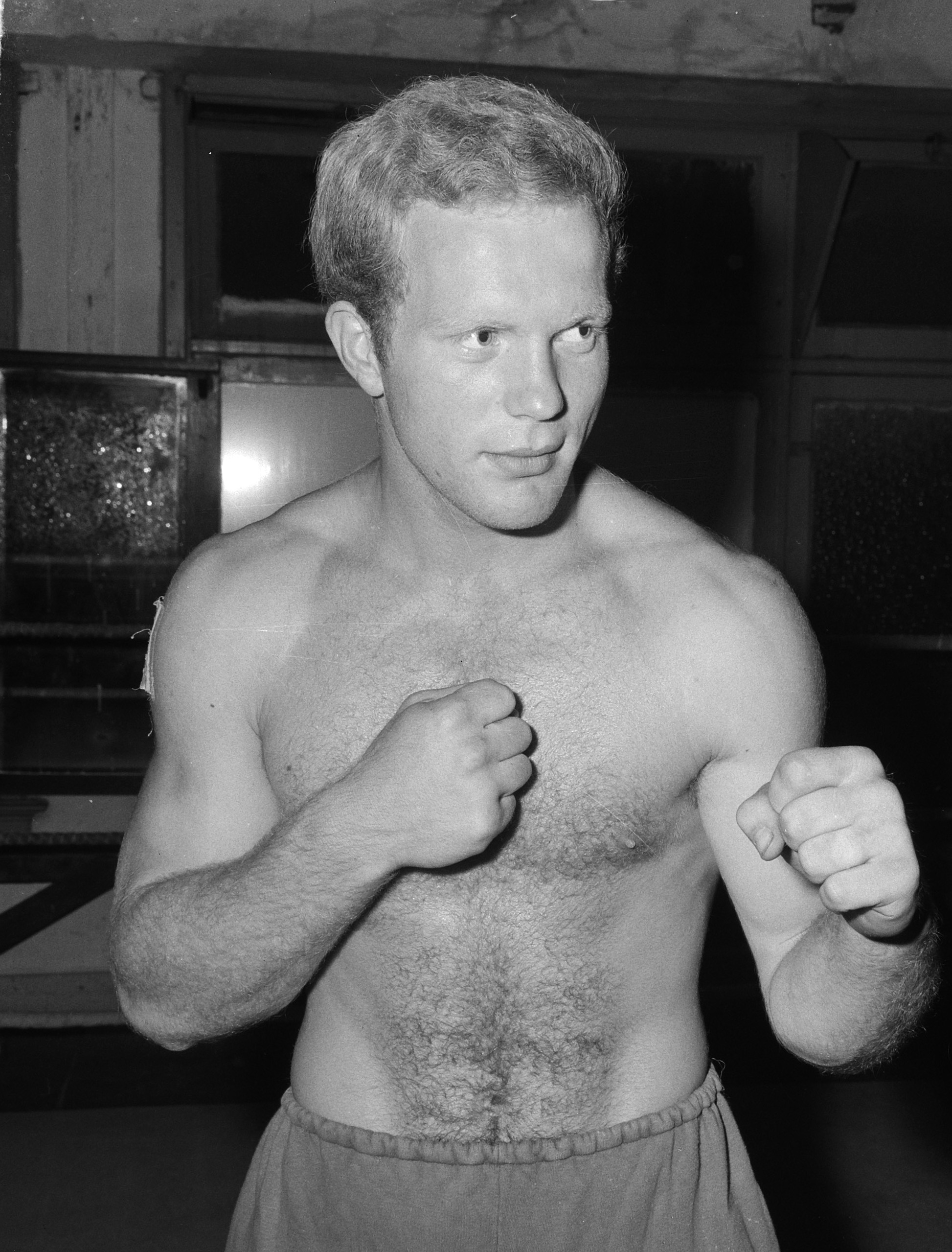
- Lubbers in 1965

Personal information
- Nationality: Dutch
- Born: Rudolfus Josefus Maria Lubbers; 17 August 1945 (age 81) Heerhugowaard, Netherlands
- Height: 1.83 m (6 ft 0 in)

Boxing career
- Weight class: Heavyweight

Boxing record
- Total fights: 36
- Wins: 28
- Win by KO: 13
- Losses: 8

Rudi Lubbers (born 17 August 1945) is a Dutch retired professional boxer who competed at the 1964 and 1968 Summer Olympics. In 1964 he finished ninth as a light heavyweight and in 1968 fifth as a heavyweight.

== Amateur career ==
=== 1964 Olympic record ===
Below are the results of Rudi Lubbers, as a Light Heavyweight at the 1964 Tokyo Olympics:

- First round-bout lost to Cosimo Pinto (Italy) via points decision

=== 1968 Olympic record ===
Below are the results of Rudi Lubbers, as heavyweight at the 1968 Mexico Olympics:

- First round-bout won against Talaat Dahshan (Egypt) via DQ
- Second round-bout lost to Joaquin Rocha (Mexico) via points decision

== Professional career ==
Lubbers turned pro in 1970, and won the Dutch heavyweight title in 1971, which he held until his retirement in 1981. Lubbers competed twice for the European heavyweight title, the first time in 1973, against Joe Bugner and the second time in 1975, versus the Italian Domenico Adinolfi but fell short both times. His most notable fight happened on October 20, 1973, against Muhammad Ali in Jakarta. It was evident during the fight, Lubbers was clearly no match to Ali; Lubbers lasted the full 12 rounds and lost via Decision. Lubbers last fought Gordon Racette on November 27, 1981, when he lost via Technical knockout in the third round and retired soon after.

== Personal life ==
After retiring Lubbers moved to Portugal, he was falsely arrested in 1986 on charges of drug smuggling. He served a sentence of four years and was released from prison in 1990. Upon his release, he tried to make a living working in carnivals with his wife Ria. In his later years Lubbers became homeless and in 2009 he was living in a run-down caravan with his 20 dogs. As of 2018, Lubbers was living in Bulgaria with Ria and their 16 stray dogs in a malfunctioning van which lacks water, electricity and sanitary facilities.

== Professional boxing record ==
36 fights	28 wins	8 losses
By knockout	13	4
By decision	13	4
By disqualification	2	0

No.	Result	Record	Opponent	Type	Round, time	Date	Location	Notes
36	Loss	28–8	Gordon Racette	TKO	3 (10), 1:55	27 Nov 1981	Civic Arena, Nanaimo, Canada	
35	Win	28–7	Uwe Meinicke	KO	1 (8)	23 Nov 1981	Rodahal, Kerkrade, Netherlands	
34	Win	27–7	Jean-Pierre Coopman	TKO	5 (10)	29 Sep 1980	Energiehal, Rotterdam, Netherlands	
33	Win	26–7	Robert Desnouck	PTS	8	1 Sep 1980	Energiehal, Rotterdam, Netherlands	
32	Win	25–7	Hennie Thoonen	DQ	7 (12)	19 May 1980	Ton Menkenhal, Rotterdam, Netherlands	Won Dutch heavyweight title
31	Loss	24–7	Ibelo Moano	SD	8	28 Apr 1980	Jaap Edenhal, Amsterdam, Netherlands	
30	Win	24–6	Terry O'Connor	PTS	8	31 Mar 1980	Sportpaleis Ahoy', Rotterdam, Netherlands	
29	Loss	23–6	Alfredo Evangelista	TKO	3 (8)	8 Oct 1976	Palacio de los Deportes, Madrid, Spain	
28	Loss	23–5	Mile Schutte	KO	3 (10)	22 May 1976	Rand Stadium, Johannesburg, South Africa	
27	Loss	23–4	Domenico Adinolfi	KO	2 (15)	31 Oct 1975	Turin, Piedmont, Italy	For European light heavyweight title
26	Win	23–3	Avenamar Peralta	DQ	5 (10)	14 Oct 1974	Sportpaleis Ahoy', Rotterdam, Netherlands	
25	Loss	22–3	Hal Caroll	UD	10	23 Sep 1974	Sportpaleis Ahoy', Rotterdam, Netherlands	
24	Win	22–2	Jean-Pierre Coopman	PTS	10	27 Apr 1974	Ghent, East Flanders, Belgium	
23	Loss	21–2	Muhammad Ali	UD	12	20 Oct 1973	Bung Karno Stadium, Jakarta, Indonesia	
22	Loss	21–1	Joe Bugner	UD	15	16 Jan 1973	Royal Albert Hall, London, England	For European heavyweight title
21	Win	21–0	Expedit Moutchou	PTS	10	13 Mar 1972	Sporthal de Vliegermolen, Voorburg, Netherlands	
20	Win	20–0	Piero Del Papa	PTS	10	31 Jan 1972	Sportpaleis Ahoy', Rotterdam, Netherlands	
19	Win	19–0	Macan Keita	KO	2 (10)	26 Dec 1971	Hallenstadion, Zurich, Switzerland	
18	Win	18–0	Dave Bailey	KO	4 (10)	7 Dec 1971	Cologne, North Rhine-Westphalia, Germany	
17	Win	17–0	Bas van Duivenbode	KO	5 (12)	8 Nov 1971	Sportpaleis Ahoy', Rotterdam, Netherlands	Retained Dutch heavyweight title
16	Win	16–0	Henri Ferjule	KO	4 (10)	27 May 1971	Cologne, North Rhine-Westphalia, Germany	
15	Win	15–0	Bas van Duivenbode	PTS	12	17 May 1971	Theatre Carré, Amsterdam, Netherlands	Won vacant Dutch heavyweight title
14	Win	14–0	Manfred Ackers	TKO	8 (8)	18 Apr 1971	Uithoorn, North Holland, Netherlands	
13	Win	13–0	Mohamed Hassan	TKO	6 (8)	2 Apr 1971	Cologne, North Rhine-Westphalia, Germany	
12	Win	12–0	Detlef Naseband	PTS	8	2 Jan 1971	Sportpalast, Berlin, Germany	
11	Win	11–0	Lloyd Walford	PTS	8	7 Dec 1970	Theatre Carré, Amsterdam, Netherlands	
10	Win	10–0	Willy Karall	TKO	6 (8)	2 Oct 1970	Frankfurt, Hesse, Germany	
9	Win	9–0	Jean Tshikuna	PTS	8	28 Sep 1970	Congresgebouw, The Hague, Netherlands	
8	Win	8–0	Detlef Naseband	PTS	8	14 Sep 1970	Rivièrahal, Rotterdam, Netherlands	
7	Win	7–0	Horst Volpert	KO	1 (8)	18 Jul 1970	De Vereeniging, Nijmegen, Netherlands	
6	Win	6–0	José Guillois	TKO	1 (6)	27 Apr 1970	Rivièrahal, Rotterdam, Netherlands	
5	Win	5–0	Henry Kerrauen	PTS	6	31 Mar 1970	Congresgebouw, The Hague, Netherlands	
4	Win	4–0	Herbert Wick	PTS	6	16 Mar 1970	RAI, Amsterdam, Netherlands	
3	Win	3–0	Andre Haudrechy	TKO	3 (8)	12 Mar 1970	Schouwburg Kunstmin, Dordrecht, Netherlands	
2	Win	2–0	Mohamed Sahib	TKO	2 (8)	28 Feb 1970	Philips Jubileumhal, Eindhoven, Netherlands	
1	Win	1–0	José Guillois	PTS	6	24 Feb 1970	Rivièrahal, Rotterdam, Netherlands	
