= Szőreg =

Human settlement in Szeged, Hungary

Coordinates: 46°12′46″N 20°11′38″E

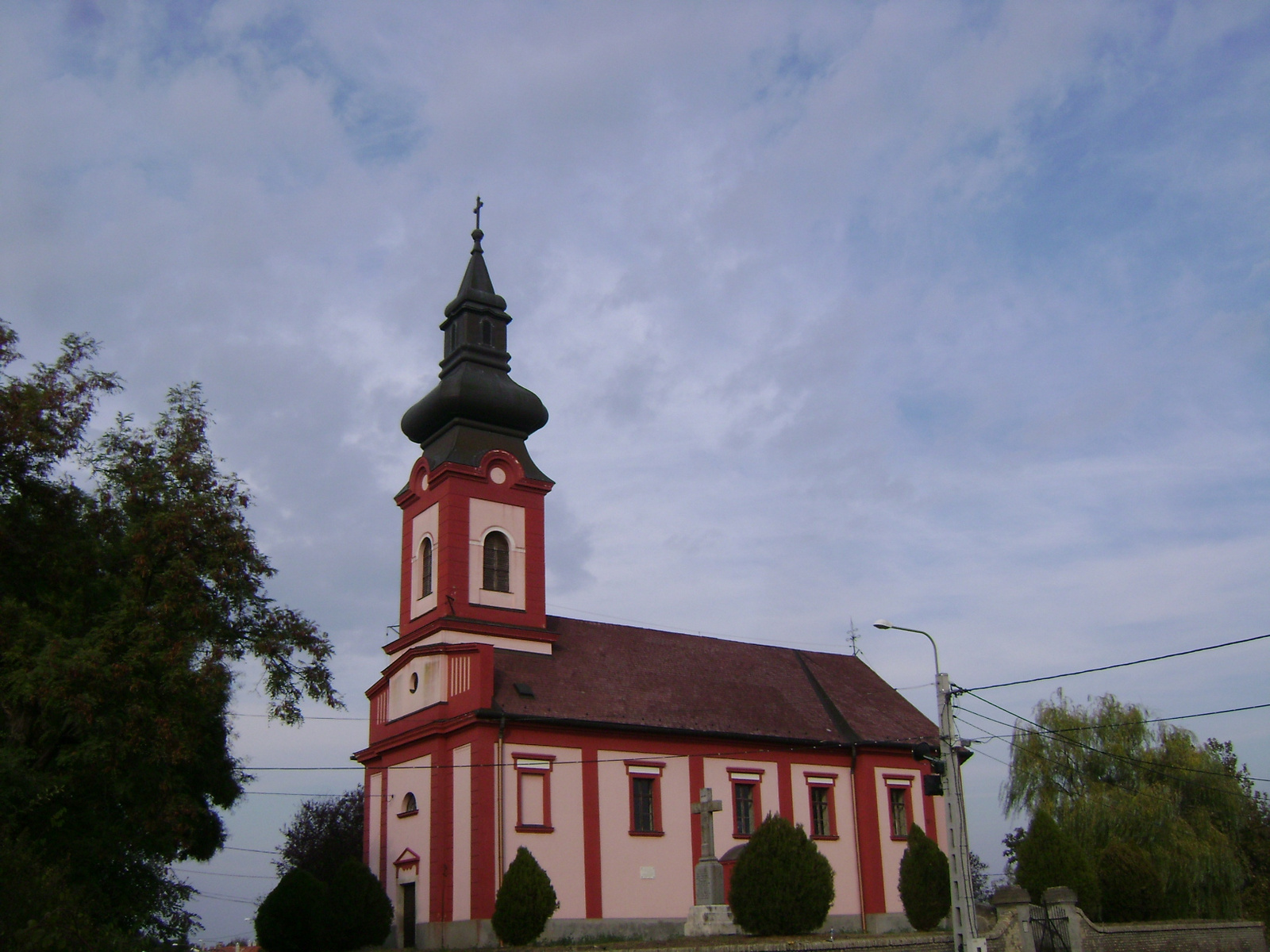
Szőreg Serbian Orthodox Church

Szőreg [ˈsøːrɛɡ] (Serbian: Сириг, Sirig; Croatian: Sirik) is a settlement which is a southeastern suburb of Szeged, in Csongrád-Csanád County, in the Banat (Hungarian: Bánát)) region, Hungary.

There are some Serbs living there besides Hungarians. Szőreg has two churches: a Roman Catholic (Hungarian) and a Serbian Orthodox church. The village has a long history. One of the final battles of the war of independence against the Habsburg Empire (1848–49) took place close to Szőreg.

The village became adjoined to Szeged in 1973. The settlement is otherwise renowned for its rose-production. A rose festival is held here every summer.

Szőreg is also known for being the birthplace of former professional boxer Joe Bugner in 1950. He emigrated to the UK as a child and boxed under the British and Australian flags.
