= Mike Tyson vs. Marvis Frazier =

Boxing match

- Date: July 26, 1986
- Venue: Glens Falls Civic Center, Glens Falls, New York, U.S.

Tale of the tape
Boxer	Mike Tyson	Marvis Frazier
Nickname	Kid Dynamite	Little Smoke
Hometown	Catskill, New York, U.S.	Wyncote, Pennsylvania, U.S.
Pre-fight record	24–0 (22 KO)	16–1 (7 KO)
Age	20 years	25 years, 10 months
Height	5 ft 10 in (178 cm)	6 ft 1/2 in (184 cm)
Weight	217 lb (98 kg)	210 lb (95 kg)
Style	Orthodox	Orthodox
Recognition	WBC; No. 2 Ranked Heavyweight; WBA; No. 4 Ranked Heavyweight; IBF; No. 8 Ranked Heavyweight	IBF; No. 4 Ranked Heavyweight; WBC; No. 9 Ranked Heavyweight

Result
- Tyson wins via 1st-round KO

Mike Tyson vs. Marvis Frazier was a professional boxing match contested on July 26, 1986. The fight took place at the Glens Falls Civic Center in Glens Falls, New York, USA. Tyson won the fight via knockout in the first round, attaining victory within thirty seconds. This would prove to be the fastest knockout victory of Tyson's career.

== Background ==
Tyson had been keeping busy throughout the first two years of his professional career. Entering 1986, he had fought a total of fifteen fights and won each one by knockout, with only one lasting longer than three rounds and eleven ending in the first round. Prior to fighting Frazier, Tyson had fought nine times in 1986 and defeated all but two fighters by knockout, as former championship challenger James Tillis and Mitch Green had taken Tyson to the full distance. He also had initially defeated Jesse Ferguson by disqualification, but the fight result was changed to a knockout. Entering this fight, Tyson was rated #2 in the World Boxing Council's ratings.

The son of former world champion Joe Frazier, Marvis was trained by his father and was regarded as an up-and-coming prospect who might some day become the heavyweight champion. Frazier would eventually get a chance to fulfill those predictions, as in only his eleventh professional fight, he challenged for the linear heavyweight championship against champion Larry Holmes on November 25, 1983, in a bout that was not recognized as a title fight by the WBC. Holmes, who would later be stripped by the WBC for accepting this fight over a mandatory defense against Greg Page, dominated the younger Frazier and knocked him out in one round.

Following his loss to Holmes, Frazier rebounded to win his next six fights, including unanimous decision victories over Tillis and future world champion James "Bonecrusher" Smith, to get back into contention. Frazier, however, came into his fight with Tyson as an overwhelming underdog, leading some to criticize his father, manager and trainer Joe for overmatching him.

The fight was carried by ABC as part of its Wide World of Sports anthology series. Jim Lampley was the lead commentator, with Alex Wallau as the analyst.

== The fight ==
Tyson quickly had Frazier on the defensive, using his left jab to back Frazier into the ropes. Frazier then retreated to the corner where Tyson continued to use his left jab before unleashing two consecutive uppercuts, the second of which knocked Frazier unconscious. Tyson then landed several more blows before Frazier fell to the canvas, slumped against the ropes. Referee Joe Cortez began to count to ten, but as Frazier was clearly unresponsive, stopped the count at five and ended the fight. The fight lasted only 30 seconds, and was the quickest victory of Tyson's professional career.

== Aftermath ==
Tyson continued his blistering pace after this fight, taking a fight against Jose Ribalta less than a month after fighting Frazier and then facing Alfonzo Ratliff three weeks after that. He won both of those fights by knockout, with Ribalta lasting until the tenth round and Ratliff the second, setting up his contest against Trevor Berbick in November where he made history and became the youngest heavyweight champion in boxing history.

Frazier, meanwhile, only fought three more times after Tyson knocked him out. After his last fight in 1988, Frazier became a minister and began working with prisoners through Prison Fellowship International.

== Undercard ==
Confirmed bouts:

== Broadcasting ==
Country	Broadcaster
United Kingdom	ITV
United States	ABC

Preceded by vs. Lorenzo Boyd	Mike Tyson's bouts 26 July 1986	Succeeded by vs. José Ribalta
Preceded by vs. James Smith	Marvis Frazier's bouts 26 July 1986	Succeeded by vs. Tom Fischer
