= Tim Witherspoon vs. Frank Bruno =

Boxing match

- Date: 19 July 1986
- Venue: Wembley Stadium, London, England
- Title on the line: WBA heavyweight title

Tale of the tape
| Boxer | Tim Witherspoon | Frank Bruno |
| Nickname | Terrible | |
| Hometown | Philadelphia, Pennsylvania, U.S. | London, England |
| Purse | $900,000 | $1,100,000 |
| Pre-fight record | 24–2 (16 KO) | 28–1 (27 KO) |
| Age | 28 years, 6 months | 24 years, 8 months |
| Height | 6 ft 3 1/2 in (192 cm) | 6 ft 3 in (191 cm) |
| Weight | 234 3/4 lb (106 kg) | 228 lb (103 kg) |
| Style | Orthodox | Orthodox |
| Recognition | WBA; Heavyweight Champion; The Ring; No. 3 Ranked Heavyweight | WBA; No. 1 Ranked Heavyweight; The Ring; No. 7 Ranked Heavyweight; European; Heavyweight Champion |

Result
- Witherspoon wins via 11th-round TKO

Tim Witherspoon vs. Frank Bruno was a professional boxing match contested on 19 July 1986, for the WBA heavyweight title.

== Background ==
Tim Witherspoon had captured his second world title after narrowly outpointing reigning WBA heavyweight champion Tony Tubbs in a close majority decision victory on January 17, 1986. Shortly after his victory, Witherspoon ran into trouble after a post-fight drug test revealed traces of marijuana in his system. Facing a possible suspension and being stripped of his title, Witherspoon admitted to smoking a single joint in November while celebrating with friends after signing the contract for the title shot against Tubbs and stated "I would never know it would trace up so many months later." Witherspoon, his promoter Don King and manager Carl King were first summoned to go before the Georgia Boxing Commission to explain the positive test after which Witherspoon was issued a one-year probation and a $500 fine. Witherspoon would then face a disciplinary hearing with the WBA in March. Though Tubbs and his team insisted Witherspoon be stripped of the title, WBA president Gilberto Mendoza opted to keep Witherspoon as champion and instead to issued him a $25,000 fine and ordered a Witherspoon–Tubbs rematch. The winner of the rematch was to then grant a title match to Frank Bruno, the top-ranked heavyweight contender, within 90 days.

The undefeated Bruno had been in talks to face Witherspoon in his native UK since Witherspoon's victory over Tubbs in January, but first needed to win a WBA "eliminator" bout against ex-WBA heavyweight champion Gerrie Coetzee on March 4, 1986. Bruno would dispatch Coetzee less than two minutes of action, winning by first-round knockout, officially becoming the WBA's top contender and entered in negotiations to face Witherspoon that July. Though Tubbs was still owed a rematch against Witherspoon, Tubbs agreed to step aside in favor of Bruno after being paid $250,000 and being promised a match that fall against the winner of the Witherspoon–Bruno fight. However, the fight was put in jeopardy after a dispute between rival British television stations ITV and BBC regarding who would broadcast the fight in the UK where the fight was set to take place. Don King and Butch Lewis had already sold the rights to their entire Heavyweight World Series (in which a series of heavyweight title matches were organized to determine an undisputed heavyweight champion) to ITV but Bruno's promoter Mickey Duff already had a longstanding agreement with BBC allowing the channel to exclusively broadcast fights that included his stable of fighters. HBO, who held the rights for the American broadcast, feared the fight would be cancelled and thus had a contingency plan in place that would see the Witherspoon–Tubbs rematch take place on the same date somewhere in the United States with Bruno facing the winner in the fall. The fight was saved on the last minute when both stations agreed to share the TV rights, with HBO agreeing to work with both in regards to producing the telecast. The fight was a major box office success, selling over 40,000 tickets, setting a then-record as the most attended boxing fight in the UK, surpassing the 1966 Ali–Cooper II fight which sold 39,000 tickets.

== The fight ==
Though both fighters were regarded for their impressive knockout power, the fight was a largely tactical affair until the 11th round. Witherspoon had a slight lead on all three scorecards at the time of the stoppage (a 2-point lead on one and 3-point lead on the other two) with five rounds being declared a draw on one scorecard, four rounds being declared a draw on another and one round on the final scorecard. Bruno was only able to win no more than two rounds according to the judges while Witherspoon had taken five, four and three rounds on the three. Then in the 11th round, Witherspoon scored a big right hand that sent Bruno staggering into the corner as Witherspoon closed in and threw more powerful right. Bruno escape the corner but Witherspoon landed three consecutive overhand rights to send Bruno on the seat of his pants in another corner. Bruno's corner threw in the towel signifying surrender and the referee halted the fight with three seconds remaining in the round giving Witherspoon the TKO victory.

== Aftermath ==
The Witherspoon Tubbs rematch was set for 12 December however Tubbs pulled out citing a shoulder injury and was replaced with James Smith.

== Fight card ==
Confirmed bouts:

| Weight Class | Weight | | vs. | | Method | Round | Notes |
|---|---|---|---|---|---|---|---|
| Heavyweight | 200+ lbs. | Tim Witherspoon (c) | def | Frank Bruno | TKO | 11/15 | ^{Note 1} |
| Featherweight | 126 lbs. | Jim McDonnell | def. | Salvatore Bottiglieri | UD | 12/12 |
| Heavyweight | 200+ lbs. | Alfonso Ratliff | def. | Stanley Ross | RTD | 4/10 |
| Middleweight | 160 lbs. | Michael Watson | def. | Simon Collins | KO | 1/8 |
| Middleweight | 160 lbs. | Mark Kaylor | def. | Tony Cerda | TKO | 6/8 |
| Heavyweight | 200+ lbs. | Gary Mason | def. | Mark Young | KO | 5/8 |
| Heavyweight | 200+ lbs. | Patrick Lumumba | def. | Walter Santemore | PTS | 6/6 |
| Super Featherweight | 130 lbs. | Paul Hodkinson | def. | Mark Champney | KO | 2/6 |

^Note 1 For WBA heavyweight title

== Broadcasting ==
| Country | Broadcaster |
|---|---|
| Mexico | Televisa |
| United Kingdom | BBC/ITV |
| United States | HBO |

| Preceded by vs. Tony Tubbs | Tim Witherspoon's bouts 19 July 1986 | Succeeded by vs. James Smith II |
| Preceded by vs. Gerrie Coetzee | Frank Bruno's bouts 19 July 1986 | Succeeded by vs. James Tillis |
