= Floyd Cummings =

American boxer (born 1949)

Personal information
- Nickname: Jumbo
- Nationality: American
- Born: December 20, 1949 (age 75) Mississippi
- Height: 6 ft 2 in (1.88 m)
- Weight: Heavyweight

Boxing career
- Stance: Orthodox

Boxing record
- Total fights: 22
- Wins: 15
- Win by KO: 13
- Losses: 6
- Draws: 1

Floyd "Jumbo" Cummings (born 20 December 1949) is an American former professional boxer best known for being the final opponent of Joe Frazier. In an interview with Sky, Frank Bruno described Cummings as the hardest hitting opponent he had ever faced even more powerful than Heavyweight Champions Mike Tyson, Lennox Lewis, Tim Witherspoon and James Smith.

Cummings served 12 years in prison for murder in the Stateville Correctional Center, Illinois, and upon his release started boxing professionally, making his debut in March 1979 at the age of 29.

He was a fringe contender in the heavyweight division in the early 1980s, fighting such opponents as Tim Witherspoon, Renaldo Snipes, and Mitch Green, losing decisions against all three. In his last fight, Cummings was stopped by Frank Bruno. Though Bruno was somewhat fortunate to survive a right hand blow on the bell of round one that left him severely dazed and on the back foot till late in the second, from which Bruno had to be helped to his corner by Terry Lawless.

He fought Joe Frazier in 1981, in what was to be a one-off comeback fight; the fight ended in a controversial draw, with Cummings badly hurting Frazier with heavy hits that caused Frazier's mouth to bleed and left eye to swell. Cummings ended his career with a record of 15 wins, six losses, and one draw.

In 2002, Cummings was sentenced to life imprisonment for armed robbery. In August 2016, Cummings was released from prison.

== Professional boxing record ==
15 Wins (13 knockouts, 2 decisions), 6 Losses (2 knockouts, 4 decisions), 1 Draw
Result	Record	Opp. Record	Opponent	Type	Round	Date	Location	Notes
Loss	15-6-1	18-0	(United Kingdom) Frank Bruno	TKO	7	11/10/1983	(United Kingdom) Royal Albert Hall, London, England	Referee stopped the bout at 2:43 of the seventh round.
Loss	15-5-1	15-1	(United States) Tim Witherspoon	UD	10	16/07/1983	(United States) The Dunes, Paradise, Nevada, U.S.	
Loss	15-4-1	10-0-1	(United States) Mitch Green	UD	10	16/02/1983	(United States) Meadowlands Arena, East Rutherford, New Jersey, U.S.	
Loss	15-3-1	15-3	(United States) Larry Frazier	PTS	10	14/08/1982	(United States) Stouffers Ballroom, Cleveland, Ohio, U.S.	
Loss	15-2-1	13-3	(United States) Jeff Sims	KO	8	02/05/1982	(United States) Playboy Hotel and Casino, Atlantic City, New Jersey, U.S.	
Draw	15-1-1	32-4	(United States) Joe Frazier	MD	10	03/12/1981	(United States) International Amphitheatre, Chicago, Illinois, U.S.	
Win	15-1	5-6	(United States) Bobby Jordan	KO	9	27/07/1981	(United States) International Amphitheatre, Chicago, Illinois, U.S.	Jordan knocked out at 1:19 of the ninth round.
Loss	14-1	20-0	(United States) Renaldo Snipes	UD	10	08/03/1981	(United States) Resorts Casino Hotel, Atlantic City, New Jersey, U.S.	
Win	14-0	10-29-2	(United States) Al Jones	KO	1	15/01/1981	(United States) Hilton Hotel, Chicago, Illinois, U.S.	Jones knocked out at 2:58 of the first round.
Win	13-0	20-2	(United States) George Mostardini	TKO	8	11/12/1980	(United States) International Amphitheatre, Chicago, Illinois, U.S.	
Win	12-0	5-15	(United States) Johnny Warr	SD	10	10/09/1980	(United States) Cicero Stadium, Chicago, Illinois, U.S.	
Win	11-0	0-13	(United States) Jesse Clark	KO	1	25/08/1980	(United States) Bismark Hotel, Chicago, Illinois, U.S.	Clark knocked out at 1:31 of the first round.
Win	10-0	--	(United States) Mike Jackson	KO	3	12/06/1980	(United States) Hilton Hotel, Chicago, Illinois, U.S.	
Win	9-0	8-24	(United States) Charles A. Atlas	TKO	1	15/05/1980	(United States) Aragon Ballroom, Chicago, Illinois, U.S.	
Win	8-0	1-6	(United States) Vic Wallace	KO	2	17/04/1980	(United States) Aragon Ballroom, Chicago, Illinois, U.S.	
Win	7-0	4-2	(United States) Amos Haynes	KO	2	18/02/1980	(United States) Aragon Ballroom, Chicago, Illinois, U.S.	
Win	6-0	4-39	(United States) Sylvester Wilder	TKO	2	01/02/1980	(United States) International Amphitheatre, Chicago, Illinois, U.S.	Referee stopped the bout at 2:59 of the second round.
Win	5-0	1-1-1	(United States) Larry Sims	UD	6	15/12/1979	(United States) Circle Arena, Chicago, Illinois, U.S.	
Win	4-0	6-1	(United States) Cornell Verse	KO	4	20/11/1979	(United States) Circle Arena, Chicago, Illinois, U.S.	
Win	3-0	2-1	(United States) George Gofarth	TKO	4	30/07/1979	(United States) International Amphitheatre, Chicago, Illinois, U.S.	
Win	2-0	--	(United States) Jim Flynn	KO	1	20/07/1979	(United States) UIC Pavilion, Chicago, Illinois, U.S.	
Win	1-0	0-4	(United States) Dave Watkins	KO	1	18/06/1979	(United States) Arnie's North Restaurant, Highland Park, Illinois, U.S.	
