= Tony Tubbs vs. Tim Witherspoon =

Boxing match

King's Dream
- Date: January 17, 1986
- Venue: Omni Coliseum, Atlanta, Georgia
- Title(s) on the line: WBA heavyweight title

Tale of the tape
| Boxer | Tony Tubbs | Tim Witherspoon |
| Nickname | TNT | Terrible |
| Hometown | Cincinnati, Ohio | Philadelphia, Pennsylvania |
| Purse | $125,000 | $50,000 |
| Pre-fight record | 21–0 (14 KO) | 23–2 (16 KO) |
| Age | 27 years, 11 months | 28 years |
| Height | 6 ft 3 in (191 cm) | 6 ft 3 1/2 in (192 cm) |
| Weight | 244 lb (111 kg) | 227 lb (103 kg) |
| Style | Orthodox | Orthodox |
| Recognition | WBA; Heavyweight Champion; The Ring; No. 4 Ranked Heavyweight | WBA; No. 1 Ranked Heavyweight; The Ring; No. 3 Ranked Heavyweight |

Result
- Witherspoon wins via MD (144–143, 144–141, 143–143)

Tony Tubbs vs. Tim Witherspoon, billed as King's Dream, was a professional boxing match contested on 17 January 1986, for the WBA heavyweight title.

== Background ==
Undefeated Tony Tubbs had captured the WBA heavyweight title in his previous fight, defeating reigning champion Greg Page in what was Page's first defense on April 29, 1985. For his first defense, Tubbs was now obligated to face the WBA's #1 ranked heavyweight Tim Witherspoon, who had become the mandatory challenger after defeating James "Bonecrusher" Smith on June 15 that same year. The fight was delayed for several months as the bout's promoter Don King faced legal charges for tax evasion and conspiracy, causing him to temporarily reduce the number of fights he promoted. When King was acquitted of all charges in November, the fight was officially announced the following month to take place on 17 January 1986. King also announced that the bout would celebrate the birthday of Martin Luther King Jr., which was January 15; two days before the fight and take place in King's native Atlanta at the Omni Coliseum.

Though it was not officially a part of it, the Tubbs–Witherspoon fight was a precursor to the heavyweight unification series, which aimed to crown a new undisputed champion, that King had announced plans for only 10 days prior. The unification series was officially announced at press conference held on the day of the fight, with the winner of the Tubbs–Witherspoon fight automatically joining the series.

== The fight ==
Witherspoon was the aggressor of the fight, pressing the action while Tubbs, weighing 244 pounds, 15 pounds heavier than he was when he won the title in his previous fight, fought at a much reserved pace. Though there were no knockdowns in the fight's 15 rounds, Witherspoon had little trouble landing punches as Tubbs took a more defensive approach, backing up and not forcing anything offensively. Despite Witherspoon's relative dominance, the three scorecards were extremely close. One judge scored the bout a draw at 143–143 (each fighter winning seven rounds apiece with one round even) while the other two scored the fight narrowly in favor of Witherspoon with scores of 144–143 (seven rounds to six with two even) and 144–141 (nine rounds to six).

== Aftermath ==
Said Witherspoon about Tubbs after the fight "He didn't do nothing. He didn't really fight like a champion. I had to chase him down." Tubbs himself offered no excuses stating "There ain't no excuses in the game of boxing. Either you win or you lose. And I take my losses like I take my wins."

Shortly after his victory, Witherspoon ran into trouble after a post-fight drug test revealed traces of marijuana in his system. Facing a possible suspension and being stripped of his title, Witherspoon admitted to smoking a single joint in November while celebrating with friends after signing the contract for the title shot against Tubbs and stated "I would never know it would trace up so many months later." Witherspoon, his promoter Don King and manager Carl King were first summoned to go before the Georgia Boxing Commission to explain the positive test after which Witherspoon was issued a one-year probation and a $500 fine. Witherspoon would then face a disciplinary hearing with the WBA in March. Though Tubbs and his team insisted Witherspoon be stripped of the title, WBA president Gilberto Mendoza opted to keep Witherspoon as champion and instead issued him a $25,000 fine and ordered a Witherspoon–Tubbs rematch.

== Fight card ==
Confirmed bouts:

| Weight Class | Weight | | vs. | | Method | Round | Notes |
|---|---|---|---|---|---|---|---|
| Heavyweight | 200+ lbs. | Tim Witherspoon | def | Tony Tubbs (c) | MD | 15/15 | ^{Note 1} |
| Heavyweight | 200+ lbs. | James Douglas | def. | Greg Page | UD | 10/10 |
| Heavyweight | 200+ lbs. | Eddie Gregg | def. | Walter Santemore | UD | 10/10 |
| Heavyweight | 200+ lbs. | Trevor Berbick | def. | Mike Perkins | TKO | 10/10 |
| Heavyweight | 200+ lbs. | Mitch Green | def. | Percell Davis | UD | 10/10 |
| Heavyweight | 200+ lbs. | David Bey | def. | Wesley Smith | SD | 10/10 |
| Heavyweight | 200+ lbs. | James Pritchard | def. | Jack Jackson | UD | 4/4 |

^Note 1 For WBA heavyweight title

== Broadcasting ==
| Country | Broadcaster |
|---|---|
| United Kingdom | ITV |
| United States | HBO |

| Preceded by vs. Greg Page | Tony Tubbs's bouts 17 January 1986 | Succeeded by vs. Mike Jameson |
| Preceded by vs. Sammy Scaff | Tim Witherspoon's bouts 17 January 1986 | Succeeded by vs. Frank Bruno |
