= Daniel Dăncuță =

Romanian boxer

Daniel Rică Dăncuță
Personal information
- Nationality: Romanian
- Born: 28 May 1971 (age 55) Bacău, Romania
- Height: 1.92 m (6 ft 4 in)
- Weight: Heavyweight

Boxing career

Boxing record
- Total fights: 19
- Wins: 16
- Win by KO: 11
- Losses: 3
Medal record
Men's amateur boxing
Representing Romania
Romania National Amateur Boxing Championships
Silver medal – second place	1989 Bucharest	Heavyweight
Gold medal – first place	1990 Brăila	Super heavyweight
Gold medal – first place	1991 Bucharest	Super heavyweight

Daniel Rică Dăncuță (born 28 May 1971) is a Romanian former professional boxer.

== Career ==
Daniel Dăncuță won twice the Romanian National Amateur Boxing Championship at the super heavyweight division in 1990 and 1991. He made his professional debut in 1992 at the age of 21 when he defeated Rudy Gutierrez by unanimous decision in a bout held at the Marriott Hotel from Irvine, California. Through his career he fought against Larry Donald, Tony Tubbs, James Smith and Jimmy Thunder. His professional career ended in 1995 with 16 wins and 3 defeats, all of his bouts took place in the United States as he had his residence in Anaheim, California. During this period, Dăncuță worked for a while as sparring partner for Mike Tyson.

== Controversy ==
In December 2011 Dăncuță was arrested by the DIICOT, being accused of initiating and forming an organized criminal group. The main accusation was that the group was skimming credit cards in Italy, Sweden, Slovenia and Netherlands. On 8 February 2012, the Bucharest Court of Appeal admitted Dăncuță's request for provisional release under judicial control, but only six days later he was arrested again by DIICOT for violating the conditions of his judicial control by going to see the boxing match between Ronald Gavril and Andrejs Loginovs. In 2014 he was convicted by a trial from Bucharest to 3 years and 6 months in prison. For similar crimes he was convicted in Italy (2001), Great Britain (2005, 2007) and Germany (2008).

== Professional boxing record ==
19 fights	16 wins	3 losses
By knockout	11	1
By decision	5	2

No.	Result	Record	Opponent	Type	Round, time	Date	Location	Notes
19	Loss	16–3	(New Zealand) Jimmy Thunder	TKO	2 (10), 2:52	9 May 1995	(United States) Aladdin Theatre, Las Vegas, Nevada, U.S.	
18	Win	16–2	(United States) Jordan Keepers	TKO	1 (8), 1:05	17 April 1995	(United States) The MARK of the Quad Cities, Moline, Illinois, U.S.	
17	Win	15–2	(United States) Craig Payne	KO	6 (8), 2:48	7 March 1995	(United States) Mystic Lake Casino Hotel, Prior Lake, Minnesota, U.S.	
16	Win	14–2	(United States) Mike Robinson	TKO	4 (8)	18 August 1994	(United States) Foxwoods Resort, Ledyard, Connecticut, U.S.	
15	Win	13–2	(United States) Larry Davis	KO	1	4 August 1994	(United States) Foxwoods Resort, Ledyard, Connecticut, U.S.	
14	Win	12–2	(United States) Jerry Jones	UD	8 (8)	21 July 1994	(United States) Foxwoods Resort, Ledyard, Connecticut, U.S.	
13	Win	11–2	(United States) Dwayne Hall	TKO	1, 2:25	10 May 1994	(United States) Foxwoods Resort, Ledyard, Connecticut, U.S.	
12	Win	10–2	(United States) James Smith	UD	3 (3)	3 December 1993	(United States) Casino Magic, Bay St. Louis, Mississippi, U.S.	
11	Loss	9–2	(United States) Tony Tubbs	UD	3 (3)	3 December 1993	(United States) Casino Magic, Bay St. Louis, Mississippi, U.S.	
10	Win	9–1	(United States) Derrick Roddy	TKO	1 (3), 2:30	3 December 1993	(United States) Casino Magic, Bay St. Louis, Mississippi, U.S.	
9	Win	8–1	(United States) Phil Prince	TKO	1 (6)	26 October 1993	(United States) Foxwoods Resort, Ledyard, Connecticut, U.S.	
8	Win	7–1	(United States) Matthew Brooks	KO	2 (4), 0:58	5 October 1993	(United States) Riviera, Winchester, Nevada, U.S.	
7	Win	6–1	(United States) Edward Escobedo	PTS	4 (4)	30 August 1993	(United States) Kemper Arena, Kansas City, Missouri, U.S.	
6	Loss	5–1	(United States) Larry Donald	MD	6 (6)	6 June 1993	(United States) Aladdin, Paradise, Nevada, U.S.	
5	Win	5–0	(United States) Jimmy Bills	TKO	1 (6), 0:38	20 April 1993	(United States) Riviera, Winchester, Nevada, U.S.	
4	Win	4–0	(United States) James Broad	UD	4 (4)	14 February 1993	(United States) Aladdin, Paradise, Nevada, U.S.	
3	Win	3–0	(United States) Craig Brinson	KO	1 (4), 0:37	24 September 1992	(United States) Marriott Hotel, Irvine, California, U.S.	
2	Win	2–0	(United States) Ricardo Phillips	TKO	1 (4)	30 July 1992	(United States) Marriott Hotel, Irvine, California, U.S.	
1	Win	1–0	(United States) Rudy Gutierrez	UD	4 (4)	25 June 1992	(United States) Marriott Hotel, Irvine, California, U.S.	
