= Marvis Frazier =

American boxer (born 1960)

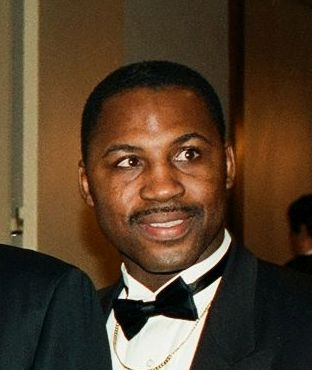
- Frazier in 1996

Personal information
- Nickname: Little Smoke
- Nationality: United States
- Born: Marvis Frazier; September 12, 1960 (age 66) Philadelphia, Pennsylvania, U.S.
- Height: 6 ft 0 1/2 in (1.84 m)
- Weight: Heavyweight

Boxing career
- Reach: 76 in (193 cm)
- Stance: Orthodox

Boxing record
- Total fights: 21
- Wins: 19
- Win by KO: 8
- Losses: 2
- Draws: 0
- No contests: 0
Medal record
Men's amateur boxing
Representing United States
Junior World Championships
Gold medal – first place	1979 Yokohama	Heavyweight

Marvis Frazier (born September 12, 1960) is an American former professional boxer who fought in the heavyweight division. The son of Joe Frazier, he challenged once for the heavyweight title in 1983.

== Early life ==
Marvis was born September 12, 1960, in Philadelphia, the son of the then future world heavyweight champion, Joe Frazier. Marvis was at ringside for all of his father's fights after the second Oscar Bonavena bout in December 1968, including the great fights with Muhammad Ali. Marvis exhibited four rounds with his father in Rochester, New York, on December 3, 1976, and staged another exhibition in 1977. His sister Jackie Frazier-Lyde was also a professional boxer, as was his brother Joe Frazier Jr. (a.k.a. Hector Frazier). Marvis lived with his family in a 16-room stone split-level home in Whitemarsh.

Marvis was involved in other sports like baseball and football, but finally gave it all up in favor of boxing, "I played football and basketball and I wrestled, and I love them all, especially football. I was a running back. When I was in ninth grade, Duke and Temple talked to me about going there. But I fell so much in love with boxing. I gave up the other sports. Once I get into a sport. I dedicate myself to it. I don't believe in concentrating on more than one thing," Marvis Frazier said on his choice of boxing. He graduated from Plymouth-Whitemarsh High School in suburban Philadelphia

== Amateur career ==
Marvis was a highly touted prospect and among the top-ranked amateur heavyweights. He was the 1979 National Golden Gloves Heavyweight Champion and 1980 National AAU Heavyweight Champion. He was coached partly by his father, and in part by Georgie Benton and Val Colbert. "My dad tried not to play too active a role in my career for fear of putting pressure on me," Marvis said. Benton said that Marvis was a model kid. He grew up "like he was poor". According to Benton, "there were no favors. When the grass on the Fraziers' two-and-a-half acre plot needed cutting, Marvis did it. With a hand mower. He goes to choir practice Monday nights, Bible study Wednesday nights and church on Sunday. He doesn't smoke, drink or run around. Not because such strictures are demanded of him, but because that's the way he is boxing or no boxing."

His amateur debut came on March 4, 1977, age 16, with a unanimous decision victory over David Bey in Philadelphia.

In February 1979, Frazier was ranked #2 U.S. amateur heavyweight by the U.S. Amateur Boxers and Coaches Association, and #1 by the Amateur Athletic Union. Frazier was a runner-up for the 1979 Pan American Games, where he was expected to meet Teófilo Stevenson for the first time in this competition. He was concentrating on the Pan American trials and the Pan Am games, after that, he was aiming for a shot at the Olympics. "That's my goal," he said, but ultimately did not take part in the Pan Am trials on the advice of his father. Joe Frazier thought his 19-year-old son was still too young and inexperienced to meet Stevenson. Marvis didn't show at the 1979 National Sports Festival in Colorado Springs, Colorado, because his father insisted that they send airplane tickets for an accompanying entourage of three people with all expenses paid. Frazier also pulled out of the World Cup, staged in New York, in October 1979, for the event was largely neglected after Cuba was banned from participation after refusing to team-up with the U.S. to form the "North American team" to compete versus European and other world's athletes.

Frazier intended to fly on LOT Polish Airlines Flight 7, where several of his teammates were killed, but his father always avoided flying, and forbade his son to fly as well. Frazier said of this experience:

Me, I love flying, but my father is the man of the house and he gave me an order not to go. I talked to my father on the phone this morning when he heard the news and he said 'See, son, I told you those planes will kill you,'" said Marvis.

Among his best amateur wins were against future pro contender Mitch Green, and future champs Tim Witherspoon, and Bonecrusher Smith. He also decisioned amateur star Jimmy Clark (the #2 ranked amateur heavyweight in the country.) He was KOd by James Broad, a man "I know nothing about," in the 1980 Olympic Trials finals.

=== Highlights ===
(gold) Philadelphia Golden Gloves, Philadelphia, Pennsylvania, March 1977 (amateur debut):

- Defeated David Bey by unanimous decision, 5–0

(gold) Pennsylvania Golden Gloves, novice division, Palestra, Philadelphia, Pennsylvania, March 1977:

- 1/2: Defeated John Owens by decision
- Finals: Defeated Jarrett Smith KO 1

(gold) Pennsylvania Golden Gloves, Civic Arena, Pittsburgh, Pennsylvania, March 1978:

- Finals: Defeated Ed Bednarik by majority decision, 4–1 (Bednarick knocked down for a 9-count in the 1st rd, was given a standing eight count once in the 2nd rd, and twice in the 3rd rd; Frazier won the Outstanding Boxer trophy)

Local match-up, New Jersey, 1978:

- Defeated (no data available) RSC 2

Local match-up, Frazier's Gym, Philadelphia, Pennsylvania, 1978:

- Defeated (no data available) KO 1 (0:45)

Indiana vs. Pennsylvania Golden Glovers match-up, Tyndall Armory, Indianapolis, Indiana, August 1978:

- Defeated (no data available) KO 2

(gold) Boxing at the Ohio State Fair, Columbus, Ohio, August 1978:

- Defeated William Hosea by split decision, 2–1

Illinois–Kentucky–Pennsylvania Golden Glovers match-up, Dunlap, Pennsylvania, October 1978:

- Defeated Keith Little by decision

(gold) Philadelphia Golden Gloves, Philadelphia, Pennsylvania, February–March 1979:

- 1/2: Defeated Tim Witherspoon by decision
- Finals: Defeated James Smith by decision

(gold) Eastern Golden Gloves, Liberty Bell Park, Philadelphia, Pennsylvania, March 1979:

- Finals: Defeated Jimmy Clark by unanimous decision, 5–0

(gold) Pennsylvania Golden Gloves, Palestra, Philadelphia, Pennsylvania, March 1979:

- Finals: Defeated Ed Bednarik KO 1 (0:29)

(gold) National Golden Gloves, Convention Center, Indianapolis, Indiana, March 1979:

- 1/16: Defeated Charles Archie KO 1 (1:43)
- 1/8: Defeated Bryon Westmoreland by decision (Westmoreland was given a standing eight count twice in the 3rd rd)
- 1/4: Defeated Walter Ware by technical walkover
- 1/2: Defeated William Hosea by decision (Hosea knocked down in the 3rd rd)
- Finals: Defeated Philip Brown by decision

Frazier vs. Ali teams match-up, Resorts International Hotel Casino, Atlantic City, New Jersey, May 1979:

- Defeated Tony Tubbs by split decision, 2–1

Frazier vs. Sports For Boys team, Municipal Auditorium, New Orleans, Louisiana, July 1979:

- Defeated Robert Lavarry

Frazier vs. Clarion team, Tippin Gymnasium, Clarion, Pennsylvania, October 1979:

- Defeated Jerome Boyd

Florida vs. Pennsylvania Golden Glovers match-up, Coliseum, Jacksonville, Florida, November 1979:

- Defeated Jeff Foster KO 1

(gold) Junior World Championships, Yokohama, Japan, December 1979:

- 1/4: Defeated Daniel Goguen (Canada) KO 2
- 1/2: Defeated Alexander Yagubkin (Soviet Union) by unanimous decision, 5–0
- Finals: Defeated Olaf Mayer (Austria) RSC 2 (2:44)

Frazier vs. Ali teams match-up, Houston, Texas, February 1980:

- Lost to Tony Tubbs by decision

(gold) National Championships, Caesars Palace, Las Vegas, Nevada, May 1980:

- Finals: Defeated Chris McDonald by decision

Olympic Trials, Atlanta, Georgia, June 1980:

- 1/4: Defeated Mitch Green by unanimous decision, 5–0
- 1/2: Lost to James Broad KO 1 (0:21)

His amateur record was 56 wins and 2 losses.

Marvis promised there will be no pro career. "If I can get that Olympic medal, that's it. I'm going to college (Peirce Junior College in Philadelphia,) and then get in business," he said in 1979. But trainer Georgie Benton saw greater potential, "He's on the road to being a defensive genius. Give me 18 months and I'll have him looking like another Houdini. If you hit him with one hand, you better forget about hitting him with that hand again. You might as well put it in your pocket He can do whatever the situation calls for. He's 18, and he's doing some things the top contenders don't do. Wait until he matures and develops a man's strength," Benton said. Benton, predicted Marvis Frazier will be "the greatest heavyweight since Joe Louis."

== Professional career ==
As a professional, Frazier is best remembered for two first-round knockout losses: a technical knockout from champion Larry Holmes in 1983 and a knockout by Mike Tyson in 1986. Pitted against Holmes after just ten professional fights (all victories), Frazier's camp touted his speed and youth as significant advantages over the champion. During the first minute, Frazier taunted Holmes by dropping his hands to his sides and playfully moving his head back and forth. Holmes knocked down Frazier with a right lead two minutes into the fight. Frazier was able to get back up at the count of eight. Frazier, badly hurt, absorbed heavy punches from Holmes, who appealed for the referee to stop the fight. Finally, the referee stopped the fight with just a few seconds left in the first round. Many in the sports press criticized Frazier's father, Joe Frazier, for changing his son's style from that of an out-fighter (which brought Marvis success as an amateur) to an in-fighter, which many thought did not suit Marvis.

After his loss to Holmes, Frazier continued to fight and won his next six matches, including victories over future world cruiserweight champion Bernard Benton, heavyweight contenders José Ribalta and James Tillis, and future champion James "Bonecrusher" Smith. With the exception of a first-round knockout in his first fight after losing to Holmes, all of Frazier's fights went the full ten round distance with him winning unanimous or majority decisions in each fight.

This set up the fight with the 24–0 Tyson, which was broadcast live from the Glens Falls Civic Center in Glens Falls, New York by ABC. Frazier quickly proved to be outmatched as Tyson landed a huge uppercut then followed with a combination that left Frazier unconscious. Referee Joe Cortez started to count while looking at Frazier, but immediately waved off the fight once he saw that Frazier was not responsive. The 30-second fight is Tyson's quickest knockout of his career.

Recalling the fight in later years, Frazier conceded that he had underestimated Tyson. "Tyson was just another guy who was going to be a statistic. Yeah, that's what I thought. I threw a jab and that's all I remember."

After Tyson, Frazier did not fight for a title again. After nearly a year away from the ring, Frazier returned to fight twice in two months, winning both of his fights over journeymen fighters. He won his final fight against Phillipp Brown in 1988, retiring with a career record of 19–2.

== Retirement and later life ==
After retiring from boxing, he became an ordained minister and active participant in Prison Fellowship Ministries. Frazier appeared on The Howard Stern Show with his father to promote HBO's Thrilla in Manila documentary on April 2, 2009.

In 2013, Frazier authored an autobiography, Meet Marvis Frazier: The Story of the Son of Smokin' Joe, with co-author Jamie Potter.

== Professional boxing record ==
19 Wins (8 knockouts, 11 decisions), 2 Losses (2 knockouts)
Res.	Record	Opponent	Type	Rd., Time	Date	Location	Notes
Win	19–2	Philipp Brown	UD	10	1988-10-12	Tucson, Arizona	
Win	18–2	Robert Evans	UD	10	1987-08-10	Secaucus, New Jersey	
Win	17–2	Tom Fischer	TKO	2 (10), 2:47	1987-06-01	Secaucus, New Jersey	
Loss	16–2	Mike Tyson	TKO	1 (10), 0:30	1986-07-26	Glens Falls, New York	
Win	16–1	James Smith	UD	10	1986-02-23	Richmond, California	
Win	15–1	José Ribalta	MD	10	1985-09-11	Atlantic City, New Jersey	
Win	14–1	James Tillis	UD	10	1985-05-20	Reno, Nevada	
Win	13–1	Funso Banjo	PTS	10	1984-12-05	London, UK	
Win	12–1	Bernard Benton	UD	10	1984-10-23	Atlantic City, New Jersey	
Win	11–1	David Starkey	TKO	1 (8), 2:50	1984-09-25	Pennsauken, New Jersey	
Loss	10–1	Larry Holmes	TKO	1 (12), 2:57	1983-11-25	Las Vegas, Nevada	For The Ring and lineal heavyweight titles
Win	10–0	Joe Bugner	UD	10	1983-06-04	Atlantic City, New Jersey	
Win	9–0	James Broad	UD	10	1983-04-10	Atlantic City, New Jersey	
Win	8–0	Mike Cohen	KO	2	1983-03-07	Charleston, South Carolina	
Win	7–0	Amos Haynes	TKO	5 (10), 2:23	1983-02-08	Atlantic City, New Jersey	
Win	6–0	Guy Casale	RTD	4 (8), 3:00	1981-09-16	Las Vegas, Nevada	
Win	5–0	Tony Pulu	UD	6	1981-08-22	Las Vegas, Nevada	
Win	4–0	Steve Zouski	KO	6 (6), 2:13	1981-05-11	New York, New York	
Win	3–0	Melvin Epps	UD	6	1981-04-10	New York, New York	
Win	2–0	Dennis Rivera	TKO	2 (4), 2:30	1980-10-10	New York, New York	
Win	1–0	Roger Troupe	TKO	3 (4), 2:08	1980-09-12	New York, New York	

Achievements
Preceded by Tony Tubbs	United States Amateur Heavyweight Champion; 1980	Succeeded by Mark Mahone
