= James Broad =

American boxer

Personal information
- Nickname: Broad Axe
- Nationality: American
- Born: James W. Broad; January 27, 1958 Greensboro, North Carolina
- Died: November 20, 2001 (aged 43)
- Height: 6 ft 4 in (193 cm)
- Weight: Heavyweight

Boxing career
- Stance: Orthodox

Boxing record
- Total fights: 33
- Wins: 23
- Win by KO: 15
- Losses: 10

James Broad (January 27, 1958 – November 20, 2001) was an American heavyweight boxer who was a Notable Contender throughout the 1980s, who beat Future World Champion James Smith and gave Heavyweight Champion Greg Page a very tough fight only losing by Majority Decision. He won the NABF heavyweight title and was a regular sparring partner of a peak Mike Tyson. He fought the likes of James Smith, Razor Ruddock, Tony Tucker, Tim Witherspoon, Johnny du Plooy, Francesco Damiani, and Greg Page.

== Military service ==
James Broad took up boxing while serving in the U.S. Army, being a Specialist 4th class stationed at Fort Ord.

== Amateur career ==
Broad took up boxing when he joined the army in 1976. He beat Chris McDonald on points, and scored a first-round-knockout victory over Marvis Frazier in the 1980 Olympic Trials finals, where he qualified for the 1980 U.S. Olympic Boxing team which ultimately did not compete due to President Jimmy Carter's order to boycott the Olympics. He also lost a decision to Tony Tubbs.

=== Highlights ===
(gold) Interserivce Boxing Championships, Camp Lejeune, North Carolina, April 10, 1980:

- Finals: Defeated Stan Butler by decision

(gold) U.S. All-Army Championships, Fort Bragg, North Carolina, March 1980

- Finals: Defeated Woody Clark by decision

U.S. Olympic Trials, Atlanta, Georgia, June 1980:

- 1/4: Defeated Freddy Guzman KO 1 (1:18; Guzman knocked down twice in the first minute of the opening round)
- 1/2: Defeated Marvis Frazier KO 1 (0:21)
- Finals: Defeated Chris McDonald by split decision, 3–2

FRG–USA Duals, West Berlin, West Germany, July 1980:

- Defeated Peter Hussing (West Germany) RSC 2
- Defeated Georg Helm (West Germany) KO 1

(gold) Gold Cup, Nairobi, Kenya, September 1980:

- Finals: Defeated Abdallah Kent (Kenya) by decision

USA–Hungary Duals, Rapid City, South Dakota, February 1981:

- Defeated József Réder (Hungary) by decision

== Professional career ==
Nicknamed "Broad-Axe", Broad turned pro in 1981 and put together 12 wins, including a 4th-round knockout of future Heavyweight Champ James "Bonecrusher" Smith. His weight was already a problem at this early stage of his career, but Broad worked down to 228 for his first big fight, against fellow undefeated prospect Marvis Frazier. Broad rocked Frazier with his signature uppercuts but was unable to replicate his knockout victory in the amateurs, and he was outworked over 10 rounds.

Broad bounced back to outpoint Larry Alexander over 12 rounds in 1983 then knockout contender Eddie Gregg in 8 rounds to win the NABF title in 1984. For his first title defense Broad scaled a whopping 261 lbs and was knocked out in 2 rounds by once and future world champion Tim Witherspoon in 1985.

=== Later years ===
Broad was unable to get back into serious shape for the remainder of his career, and his results suffered. He lost a 12-round decision to top contender and future world champion Tony Tucker for the USBA title in 1986, and in 1987 was twice outpointed over 10 rounds, by Francesco Damiani in Italy and then by ex-world champ Greg Page, in a fight where both men were down.

Broad outpointed future cruiserweight world title-challenger Patrick Lumumba but went to South Africa and was poleaxed in 4 rounds by Johnny DuPlooy. In his next fight he was stopped on his feet, in questionable circumstances, by rising contender Donovan "Razor" Ruddock. During all this time Broad was a sparring partner for a peak Mike Tyson and took many punches in the gym.

== Death ==
In 1992 Boxing Illustrated reported that Broad intended to make a comeback and wanted to be world champion, despite the fact he was banned in Nevada and California both for failing a neurological exam and testing positive for Hepatitis. He somehow managed to get 4 more fights, losing 3 of them. By 2000 Broad was said to be homeless in Las Vegas and badly brain damaged. He died in 2001.

== Professional boxing record ==
23 Wins (15 knockouts, 8 decisions), 10 Losses (3 knockouts, 7 decisions)
Result	Opp; Record	Opponent	Type	Round	Date	Location	Notes
Loss	13-8	(United States) Calvin Jones	MD	10	20/08/1993	(United States) Melrose Park, Illinois, U.S.	
Win	30-10-2	(United States) Philipp Brown	PTS	8	26/06/1993	(United States) Saint George, Utah, U.S.	
Loss	3-0	(Romania) Daniel Dăncuță	UD	4	14/02/1993	(United States) Las Vegas, Nevada, U.S.	
Loss	11-1	(United States) Billy Wright	UD	6	06/10/1992	(United States) Miami Beach, Florida, U.S.	
Win	--	(United States) Maurice Smith	TKO	4	05/10/1991	Vancouver, British Columbia, Canada	Referee stopped the bout at 1:26 of the fourth round.
Loss	20-1-1	(Canada) Donovan Ruddock	TKO	1	06/12/1988	Halifax, Nova Scotia, Canada	Referee stopped the bout at 2:58 of the first round.
Loss	17-1	(South Africa) Johnny du Plooy	KO	4	27/02/1988	Johannesburg, South Africa	
Win	6-1	(Kenya) Patrick Lumumba	PTS	10	01/08/1987	(United States) Las Vegas, Nevada, U.S.	
Loss	26-6	(United States) Greg Page	MD	10	30/05/1987	(United States) Las Vegas, Nevada, U.S.	
Loss	16-0	(Italy) Francesco Damiani	UD	10	11/04/1987	Bologna, Italy	
Loss	32-0	(United States) Tony "TNT" Tucker	UD	12	26/09/1986	(United States) Atlantic City, New Jersey, U.S.	USBA Heavyweight Title.
Win	3-11-1	(United States) Wesley Smith	KO	2	28/06/1986	(United States) Troy, New York, U.S.	
Win	23-8-1	(United States) Bobby Crabtree	KO	5	03/05/1986	(United States) Glens Falls, New York, U.S.	Crabtree knocked out at 1:27 of the fifth round.
Win	13-1	(United States) Rodney Frazier	TKO	1	25/01/1986	(United States) Atlantic City, New Jersey, U.S.	Referee stopped the bout at 0:55 of the first round.
Loss	19-2	(United States) "Terrible" Tim Witherspoon	KO	2	29/04/1985	(United States) Buffalo, New York, U.S.	NABF Heavyweight Title. Broad knocked out at 2:35 of the second round.
Win	5-2-1	(United States) Sterling Benjamin	TKO	2	14/12/1984	(United States) New York City, U.S.	Referee stopped the bout at 2:59 of the second round.
Win	20-0-1	(United States) Eddie Gregg	TKO	8	23/08/1984	(United States) New York City, U.S.	NABF Heavyweight Title. Referee stopped the bout at 0:48 of the eighth round.
Win	32-4	(United States) Tommy Franco Thomas	TKO	3	03/05/1984	(United States) Atlantic City, New Jersey, U.S.	
Win	22-9-2	(United States) Larry Alexander	SD	12	17/11/1983	(United States) Atlantic City, New Jersey, U.S.	
Win	12-7-4	(United States) Leroy Diggs	TKO	8	18/08/1983	(United States) Atlantic City, New Jersey, U.S.	Referee stopped the bout at 2:43 of the eighth round.
Loss	8-0	(United States) Marvis Frazier	UD	10	10/04/1983	(United States) Atlantic City, New Jersey, U.S.	
Win	19-11-1	(Tonga) Tony Pulu	KO	3	10/03/1983	(United States) Las Vegas, Nevada, U.S.	
Win	19-10	(United States) Walter Santemore	UD	12	06/01/1983	(United States) Atlantic City, New Jersey, U.S.	ESPN Heavyweight Title.
Win	12-0	(United States) Donnie Long	MD	10	17/10/1982	(United States) Atlantic City, New Jersey, U.S.	
Win	16-5-2	(United States) Randy Mack	TKO	8	16/09/1982	(United States) Atlantic City, New Jersey, U.S.	
Win	5-9	(United States) Art Robinson	DQ	4	04/08/1982	(United States) Atlantic City, New Jersey, U.S.	
Win	2-2	(United States) Lonnie Chapman	KO	2	18/07/1982	(United States) Atlantic City, New Jersey, U.S.	
Win	5-3-1	(United States) Harold Rice	PTS	8	02/04/1982	(United States) Atlantic City, New Jersey, U.S.	
Win	13-3-2	(United States) Lou Benson, Jr.	PTS	8	11/02/1982	(United States) Atlantic City, New Jersey, U.S.	
Win	4-4-3	(United States) Robert Evans	TKO	6	17/12/1981	(United States) Atlantic City, New Jersey, U.S.	
Win	--	(United States) James "Bonecrusher" Smith	TKO	4	05/11/1981	(United States) Atlantic City, New Jersey, U.S.	Referee stopped the bout at 1:07 of the fourth round.
Win	--	(United States) Greg Stephany	KO	3	16/09/1981	(United States) New York City, U.S.	Referee stopped the bout at 1:21 of the third round.
Win	0-4	(United States) Albert Collins	KO	1	11/08/1981	(United States) Atlantic City, New Jersey, U.S.	Collins refused to continue at 0:59 of the first round.
