= Tim Witherspoon =

American boxer

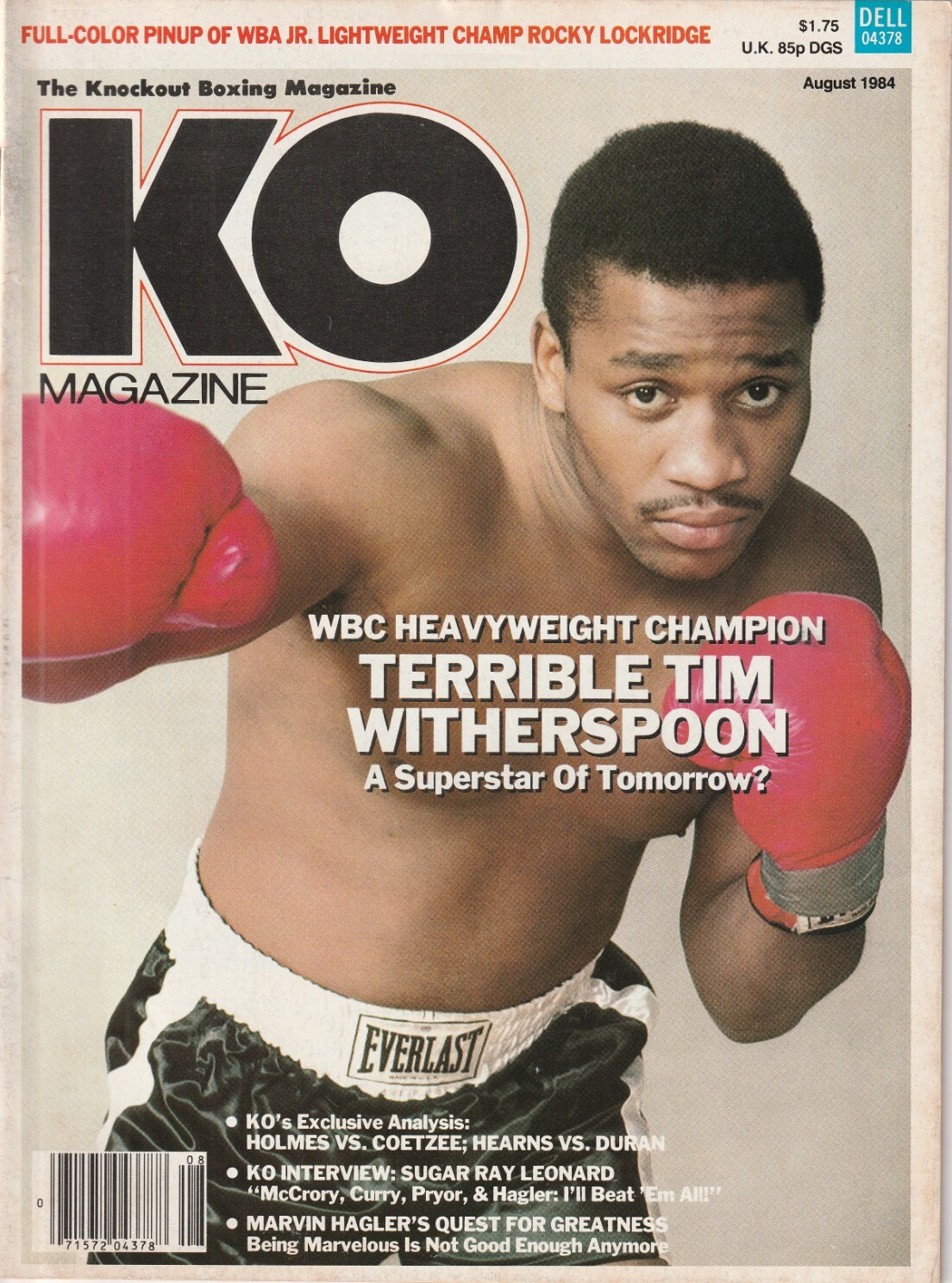
- Witherspoon on the cover of an issue of KO Magazine, cover dated August 1984

Personal information
- Nickname: Terrible
- Born: December 27, 1957 (age 68) Philadelphia, Pennsylvania, U.S.
- Height: 6 ft 3 1/2 in (192 cm)
- Weight: Heavyweight

Boxing career
- Reach: 78 in (198 cm)
- Stance: Orthodox

Boxing record
- Total fights: 69
- Wins: 55
- Win by KO: 38
- Losses: 13
- Draws: 1

Tim Witherspoon (born December 27, 1957) is an American former professional boxer who competed from 1979 to 2003. He was a two-time world heavyweight champion, having held the WBC title in 1984, and the WBA title in 1986. He beat heavyweight world champions Greg Page, James Smith, Tony Tubbs, Frank Bruno and cruiserweight world champions Alfonzo Ratliff and Al Cole. He is famous for his fight against undefeated heavyweight world champion Larry Holmes in which he lost by split decision. Witherspoon also worked as a regular sparring partner for Muhammad Ali.

== Professional career ==
=== Early years ===
Witherspoon had six amateur bouts, losing the last to Marvis Frazier on decision after getting knocked down.

Making his professional debut with a first-round TKO over Joe Adams on October 30, 1979, Witherspoon quickly rose through the ranks. In 1981, he participated in his first high-profile fight, knocking out future world cruiserweight champion Alfonzo Ratliff, after which he was signed by Don King. Witherspoon was a sparring partner of Ali as he was training to fight Larry Holmes and Trevor Berbick. Ali also gave Witherspoon his complimentary ring alias of "Terrible" Tim Witherspoon.

In 1982, he was matched with Renaldo Snipes, who had just given champion Larry Holmes a fair challenge (and knocked Holmes down), and outpointed him over 10 rounds, setting up his own challenge to Holmes.

=== Witherspoon vs. Larry Holmes: WBC heavyweight title ===
On May 20, 1983, Witherspoon would have his first attempt at earning a world title by taking on the recognized top man in the division World Boxing Council champion Larry Holmes at the Dunes Hotel in Las Vegas. Witherspoon gave Holmes all he could handle, including rocking him badly in the ninth round, before losing a twelve-round split decision.

He returned later in the year to outpoint Floyd "Jumbo" Cummings, who had drawn with Joe Frazier in Smokin' Joe's last fight, and win the NABF title with a first-round knockout of James "Quick" Tillis.

=== First title reign: WBC heavyweight champion ===
In December 1983, Holmes relinquished his WBC title rather than defend against Greg Page, and chose to accept that of the newly formed IBF (International Boxing Federation).

Witherspoon was matched with Page for the vacant title on March 9, 1984. Page, in constant war with promoter Don King, turned up overweight and was outpointed.

Witherspoon's reign as champion would not be long however, as soon he himself was in constant war with King, and on August 31 of that year he was outpointed by Pinklon Thomas via majority decision.

=== Second title reign: WBA heavyweight champion ===
In 1985 Witherspoon regained his NABF belt by beating James Broad in two rounds and made a successful twelve round defense against James "Bonecrusher" Smith in his first defense of the belt. This earned him another chance at a heavyweight title and he signed to fight reigning WBA champion Tony Tubbs on January 17, 1986, in Atlanta. Witherspoon won a close fight by majority decision, winning by only one point on one of the scorecards and three on another with one even, to become champion for a second time.

In his first defense of his newly won championship, Witherspoon traveled to London and fought a young up-and-coming English heavyweight and future world champion Frank Bruno at Wembley Stadium, as part of the heavyweight unification series. In the eleventh round of a scheduled fifteen, Witherspoon recorded a technical knockout and did something he had not done when he was champion the first time: make a successful defense of the title after winning it. After defeating Bruno, a rematch with Tony Tubbs loomed but Tubbs pulled out of the fight.

Needing to make a title defense, Witherspoon accepted a second fight with Bonecrusher Smith. Since dropping a lopsided decision in their first matchup (losing every round but one on all three scorecards) Smith had fought four bouts and recorded three wins, all against fringe contenders and journeymen. The fight was scheduled for December 12, 1986 at Madison Square Garden and Witherspoon a heavy favorite against the 17–5 Smith. With fifty seconds remaining in the first round, Witherspoon hit the canvas a third time and Rivera ended the proceedings. At ringside, HBO commentators Barry Tompkins, Larry Merchant, and Sugar Ray Leonard expressed disbelief at the outcome, with all three calling the bout a major upset.

=== Post-championship career ===
Following the end his second title reign, Witherspoon spent years in litigation against Don King. In 1991 won the USBA heavyweight title by defeating fellow contender Carl "The Truth" Williams but lost a points decision to Everett Martin. Ring magazine called this inexplicable loss the low point of his career.

In 1993 Don King settled out of court and paid Witherspoon a million dollars. By 1994 Witherspoon had won five fights in a row by knockout. Aged 38 he was signed by HBO and matched in high-profile fights with cruiserweight champion Al Cole and the Cuban amateur Jorge Luis González, both of whom he defeated. Later in the year he was matched with Ray Mercer but lost a 10-round decision.

After that loss Witherspoon laid off a year, and when he came back he was outpointed by Larry Donald on HBO, and, in 1998, lost a close decision when outworked by New Zealander Jimmy Thunder before travelling to Poland to be outpointed by Andrew Golota.

The 43-year-old Witherspoon resurfaced in 2001, knocking out the prospect David Bostice in one round, outpointing Cuban southpaw contender Eliecer Castillo and Syrian Ahmed Abdin, before his revival was ended by Lou Savarese, who stopped him in five rounds.

Witherspoon also competed in Cedric Kushner's 2003 Thunderbox Heavyweight Tournament, "Fistful of Dollars," but lost in the opening stages.

== Boxing Style ==
Like other Philadelphia fighters, such as George Benton, Witherspoon was known for his use of the Philly Shell. Witherspoon would switch between the Philly Shell and the cross-armed guard depending on what punches he was defending against. Witherspoon used this defense in conjunction with rubber necking, which is turning the head to reduce the impact of punches, and effective counterpunching.

== Life after boxing ==
Witherspoon resides near Philadelphia, Pennsylvania, where he trains boxers, including his son, lightweight Tim Witherspoon Jr. and many others. He has also trained light heavyweight champion Clinton Woods in the UK.

In 2014, Witherspoon published his book with the help of British entrepreneur Kevin Baker and ghost writer Ryan Danes.

== Professional boxing record ==
| 69 fights | 55 wins | 13 losses |
|---|---|---|
| By knockout | 38 | 4 |
| By decision | 17 | 9 |
| Draws | 1 | |

| No. | Result | Record | Opponent | Type | Round, time | Date | Age | Location | Notes |
|---|---|---|---|---|---|---|---|---|---|
| 69 | Loss | 55–13–1 | Brian Nix | SD | 10 | Mar 15, 2003 | 45 years, 78 days | Grand Casino, Gulfport, Mississippi, U.S. | |
| 68 | Loss | 55–12–1 | Lou Savarese | TKO | 5 (12), 2:42 | Sep 22, 2002 | 44 years, 269 days | Table Mountain Casino, Friant, California, U.S. | For vacant WBO Inter-Continental heavyweight title |
| 67 | Win | 55–11–1 | Ahmed Abdin | UD | 10 | May 18, 2002 | 44 years, 142 days | Silver Star Hotel & Casino, Choctaw, Mississippi, U.S. | |
| 66 | Win | 54–11–1 | Darroll Wilson | KO | 2 (10), 1:02 | Mar 10, 2002 | 44 years, 73 days | Green Valley Ranch, Henderson, Nevada, U.S. | |
| 65 | Win | 53–11–1 | Ed White | TKO | 1, 1:10 | Jan 18, 2002 | 44 years, 22 days | Entertainment & Sports Arena, Raleigh, North Carolina, U.S. | |
| 64 | Win | 52–11–1 | Cleveland Woods | KO | 1 (10), 2:30 | Jul 29, 2001 | 43 years, 214 days | Palace Indian Gaming Center, Lemoore, California, U.S. | |
| 63 | Loss | 51–11–1 | Monte Barrett | SD | 10 | Jun 28, 2001 | 43 years, 183 days | Turning Stone Resort Casino, Verona, New York, U.S. | |
| 62 | Win | 51–10–1 | Danny Wofford | TKO | 3 (10) | Apr 13, 2001 | 43 years, 107 days | University, Hampton, Virginia, U.S. | |
| 61 | Win | 50–10–1 | Elieser Castillo | MD | 10 | Mar 31, 2001 | 43 years, 94 days | Bally's Park Place, Atlantic City, New Jersey, U.S. | |
| 60 | Win | 49–10–1 | David Bostice | TKO | 1 (10), 2:21 | Feb 22, 2001 | 43 years, 57 days | Zembo Shrine Building, Harrisburg, Pennsylvania, U.S. | |
| 59 | Win | 48–10–1 | David Smith | TKO | 2 (10), 2:12 | Jul 8, 2000 | 42 years, 194 days | Monroe, Louisiana, U.S. | |
| 58 | Draw | 47–10–1 | Mike Sedillo | PTS | 12 | Apr 29, 2000 | 42 years, 124 days | St. John's, Antigua and Barbuda | For NBA heavyweight title |
| 57 | Win | 47–10 | Joe Ballard | KO | 1 | Feb 25, 2000 | 42 years, 60 days | Philadelphia, Pennsylvania, U.S. | |
| 56 | Loss | 46–10 | Greg Page | RTD | 7 (10), 3:00 | Jun 18, 1999 | 41 years, 173 days | Cumberland County Crown Coliseum, Fayetteville, North Carolina, U.S. | |
| 55 | Loss | 46–9 | Brian Nielsen | TKO | 4 (10) | Apr 16, 1999 | 41 years, 110 days | K.B. Hallen, Copenhagen, Denmark | |
| 54 | Loss | 46–8 | Andrew Golota | UD | 10 | Oct 2, 1998 | 40 years, 279 days | Centennial Hall, Wrocław, Poland | |
| 53 | Loss | 46–7 | Jimmy Thunder | UD | 10 | Apr 7, 1998 | 40 years, 101 days | Harrah's Hotel and Casino, Cherokee, North Carolina, U.S. | |
| 52 | Loss | 46–6 | Larry Donald | UD | 12 | Dec 13, 1997 | 39 years, 351 days | Foxwoods Resort Casino, Ledyard, Connecticut, U.S. | For WBC Continental Americas heavyweight title |
| 51 | Win | 46–5 | Levi Billups | TKO | 1 (10), 1:44 | Nov 4, 1997 | 39 years, 312 days | Grand Casino, Tunica, Mississippi, U.S. | |
| 50 | Loss | 45–5 | Ray Mercer | UD | 10 | Dec 14, 1996 | 38 years, 353 days | Convention Hall, Atlantic City, New Jersey, U.S. | |
| 49 | Win | 45–4 | Jorge Luis González | TKO | 5 (10), 2:54 | May 10, 1996 | 38 years, 135 days | Madison Square Garden, New York City, New York, U.S. | |
| 48 | Win | 44–4 | Al Cole | UD | 10 | Jan 12, 1996 | 38 years, 16 days | Madison Square Garden, New York City, New York, U.S. | |
| 47 | Win | 43–4 | Tim Puller | TKO | 2 (10), 0:45 | Nov 14, 1995 | 37 years, 322 days | Casino Magic, Bay St. Louis, Mississippi, U.S. | |
| 46 | Win | 42–4 | Everton Davis | TKO | 7 (10), 1:34 | Oct 31, 1995 | 37 years, 308 days | Veterans Memorial Coliseum, Phoenix, Arizona, U.S. | |
| 45 | Win | 41–4 | Jesse Shelby | TKO | 1 (10) | Mar 24, 1995 | 37 years, 87 days | Philadelphia, Pennsylvania, U.S. | |
| 44 | Win | 40–4 | Nathaniel Fitch | TKO | 6 (10) | Dec 17, 1994 | 36 years, 355 days | Etess Arena, Atlantic City, New Jersey, U.S. | |
| 43 | Win | 39–4 | Sherman Griffin | TKO | 3 (10), 2:58 | Aug 12, 1994 | 36 years, 228 days | South Padre Island, Texas, U.S. | |
| 42 | Win | 38–4 | Tony Willis | UD | 10 | Aug 25, 1992 | 34 years, 242 days | Harrah's Marino Resort, Atlantic City, New Jersey, U.S. | |
| 41 | Loss | 37–4 | Everett Martin | SD | 10 | Jul 21, 1992 | 34 years, 207 days | The Palace, Auburn Hills, Michigan, U.S. | |
| 40 | Win | 37–3 | James Pritchard | UD | 10 | Mar 23, 1992 | 34 years, 87 days | Harrah's Marina Resort, Atlantic City, New Jersey, U.S. | |
| 39 | Win | 36–3 | Jimmy Lee Smith | KO | 1 (10), 2:27 | Feb 4, 1992 | 34 years, 38 days | Trump Plaza Hotel and Casino, Atlantic City, New Jersey, U.S. | |
| 38 | Win | 35–3 | Art Tucker | TKO | 3 (12), 1:33 | Sep 10, 1991 | 33 years, 257 days | The Blue Horizon, Philadelphia, Pennsylvania, U.S. | Retained USBA heavyweight title |
| 37 | Win | 34–3 | Carl Williams | SD | 12 | Mar 8, 1991 | 33 years, 71 days | Etess Arena, Atlantic City, New Jersey, U.S. | Won USBA heavyweight title |
| 36 | Win | 33–3 | José Ribalta | MD | 10 | Jul 19, 1990 | 32 years, 204 days | Kingdome, Seattle, Washington, U.S. | |
| 35 | Win | 32–3 | Greg Gorrell | TKO | 3 (10), 1:00 | Mar 12, 1990 | 32 years, 75 days | Gelora Senayan Main Stadium, Jakarta, Indonesia | |
| 34 | Win | 31–3 | Jeff Sims | RTD | 5 (10), 3:00 | Jan 11, 1990 | 32 years, 15 days | Trump Plaza Hotel and Casino, Atlantic City, New Jersey, U.S. | |
| 33 | Win | 30–3 | Anders Eklund | KO | 1 (10), 1:11 | Oct 19, 1989 | 31 years, 296 days | Trump Plaza Hotel and Casino, Atlantic City, New Jersey, U.S. | |
| 32 | Win | 29–3 | Larry Alexander | SD | 10 | Jan 27, 1989 | 31 years, 31 days | Bally's Las Vegas, Paradise, Nevada, U.S. | |
| 31 | Win | 28–3 | Mauricio Villegas | TKO | 9 (10) | Feb 17, 1988 | 30 years, 52 days | York Hall, London, England | |
| 30 | Win | 27–3 | Mike Williams | SD | 10 | Oct 14, 1987 | 29 years, 291 days | Steel Pier, Atlantic City, New Jersey, U.S. | |
| 29 | Win | 26–3 | Mark Wills | TKO | 1 (10), 1:15 | Aug 4, 1987 | 29 years, 220 days | Steel Pier, Atlantic City, New Jersey, U.S. | |
| 28 | Loss | 25–3 | James Smith | TKO | 1 (15), 2:12 | Dec 12, 1986 | 28 years, 350 days | Madison Square Garden, New York City, New York, U.S. | Lost WBA heavyweight title |
| 27 | Win | 25–2 | Frank Bruno | TKO | 11 (15), 2:57 | Jul 19, 1986 | 28 years, 204 days | Wembley Stadium, London, England | Retained WBA heavyweight title |
| 26 | Win | 24–2 | Tony Tubbs | MD | 15 | Jan 17, 1986 | 28 years, 21 days | Omni Coliseum, Atlanta, Georgia, U.S. | Won WBA heavyweight title |
| 25 | Win | 23–2 | Sammy Scaff | TKO | 4 (10), 1:04 | Oct 12, 1985 | 27 years, 289 days | National Exhibition Centre, Birmingham, England | |
| 24 | Win | 22–2 | Larry Beilfuss | TKO | 1 (10), 1:35 | Sep 6, 1985 | 27 years, 253 days | Tamiami Park Auditorium, Miami, Florida, U.S. | |
| 23 | Win | 21–2 | James Smith | UD | 12 | Jun 15, 1985 | 27 years, 170 days | Riviera, Winchester, Nevada, U.S. | Retained NABF heavyweight title |
| 22 | Win | 20–2 | James Broad | KO | 2 (12), 2:35 | Apr 29, 1985 | 27 years, 123 days | Memorial Auditorium, Buffalo, New York, U.S. | Won NABF heavyweight title |
| 21 | Win | 19–2 | Mark Wills | TKO | 9 (10), 1:13 | Mar 25, 1985 | 27 years, 88 days | The Forum, Inglewood, California, U.S. | |
| 20 | Loss | 18–2 | Pinklon Thomas | MD | 12 | Aug 31, 1984 | 26 years, 248 days | Riviera, Winchester, Nevada, U.S. | Lost WBC heavyweight title |
| 19 | Win | 18–1 | Greg Page | MD | 12 | Mar 9, 1984 | 26 years, 73 days | Las Vegas Convention Center, Winchester, Nevada, U.S. | Won vacant WBC heavyweight title |
| 18 | Win | 17–1 | James Tillis | TKO | 1 (12), 2:16 | Sep 23, 1983 | 25 years, 270 days | Coliseum, Richfield, Ohio, U.S. | Won vacant NABF heavyweight title |
| 17 | Win | 16–1 | Floyd Cummings | UD | 10 | Jul 16, 1983 | 25 years, 201 days | Dunes, Paradise, Nevada, U.S. | |
| 16 | Loss | 15–1 | Larry Holmes | SD | 12 | May 20, 1983 | 25 years, 144 days | Dunes, Paradise, Nevada, U.S. | For WBC and The Ring heavyweight titles |
| 15 | Win | 15–0 | Renaldo Snipes | MD | 10 | Jun 5, 1982 | 24 years, 160 days | Caesars Palace, Paradise, Nevada, U.S. | |
| 14 | Win | 14–0 | Luis Acosta | KO | 2 (10), 0:42 | Mar 30, 1982 | 24 years, 93 days | Playboy Hotel and Casino, Atlantic City, New Jersey, U.S. | |
| 13 | Win | 13–0 | Alfonzo Ratliff | TKO | 7 (10), 2:25 | Dec 5, 1981 | 23 years, 343 days | Sands, Atlantic City, New Jersey, U.S. | |
| 12 | Win | 12–0 | Curtis Gaskins | KO | 2 (8) | Nov 17, 1981 | 23 years, 325 days | Playboy Hotel and Casino, Atlantic City, New Jersey, U.S. | |
| 11 | Win | 11–0 | Jerry Williams | TKO | 8 (10) | Jul 30, 1981 | 23 years, 215 days | Martin Luther King Arena, Philadelphia, Pennsylvania, U.S. | |
| 10 | Win | 10–0 | Bobby Jordan | KO | 4 (10) | Jun 17, 1981 | 23 years, 172 days | Martin Luther King Arena, Philadelphia, Pennsylvania, U.S. | |
| 9 | Win | 9–0 | Dave Johnson | UD | 8 | Apr 11, 1981 | 23 years, 105 days | Concord Resort Hotel, Thompson, New York, U.S. | |
| 8 | Win | 8–0 | Marvin Stinson | PTS | 10 | Feb 7, 1981 | 23 years, 42 days | Steel Pier, Atlantic City, New Jersey, U.S. | |
| 7 | Win | 7–0 | Ed Bednarik | TKO | 1, 2:06 | Jan 24, 1981 | 23 years, 28 days | Martin Luther King Arena, Philadelphia, Pennsylvania, U.S. | |
| 6 | Win | 6–0 | James Reid | TKO | 6 (8) | Dec 11, 1980 | 22 years, 350 days | Martin Luther King Arena, Philadelphia, Pennsylvania, U.S. | |
| 5 | Win | 5–0 | Oliver Wright | TKO | 2 (8) | Oct 24, 1980 | 22 years, 302 days | Martin Luther King Arena, Philadelphia, Pennsylvania, U.S. | |
| 4 | Win | 4–0 | Charles Cox | KO | 5 | Jul 20, 1980 | 22 years, 206 days | The Great Gorge Playboy Club Hotel, McAfee, New Jersey, U.S. | |
| 3 | Win | 3–0 | Robert Evans | UD | 6 | May 9, 1980 | 22 years, 134 days | Long Island Arena, Commack, New York, U.S. | |
| 2 | Win | 2–0 | Robert Ritchie | KO | 1 | Apr 26, 1980 | 22 years, 121 days | Lynchburg, Virginia, U.S. | |
| 1 | Win | 1–0 | Joe Adams | TKO | 1, 1:58 | Oct 30, 1979 | 21 years, 307 days | Forum, Upper Darby Township, Pennsylvania, U.S. | |

Sporting positions
Regional boxing titles
| Vacant Title last held by Michael Dokes | NABF heavyweight champion September 23, 1983 – January 1986; Vacated | Vacant Title next held by James Broad |
| Preceded by Carl Williams | USBA heavyweight champion March 8, 1991 – February 1992; Vacated | Vacant Title next held by Mike Hunter |
World boxing titles
| Vacant Title last held by Larry Holmes | WBC heavyweight champion March 9, 1984 – August 31, 1984 | Succeeded by Pinklon Thomas |
| Preceded by Tony Tubbs | WBA heavyweight champion January 17, 1986 – December 12, 1986 | Succeeded by James Smith |
