= Frank Bruno =

English boxer (born 1961)

Frank Bruno MBE
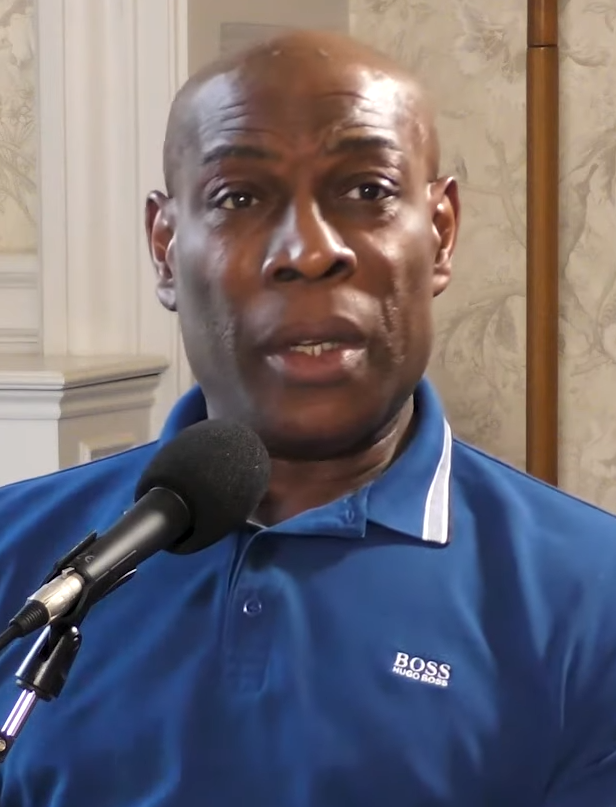
- Bruno in 2022

Personal information
- Nickname: True Brit
- Born: Franklin Roy Bruno; 16 November 1961 (age 64) Hammersmith, London, England
- Height: 6 ft 3 in (191 cm)
- Weight: Heavyweight

Boxing career
- Reach: 82 in (208 cm)
- Stance: Orthodox

Boxing record
- Total fights: 45
- Wins: 40
- Win by KO: 38
- Losses: 5
Medal record
Men's amateur boxing
Representing England
English National Championships
Gold medal – first place	1980 London	Heavyweight

Franklin Roy Horatio Bruno MBE (born 16 November 1961) is an English former professional boxer who competed from 1982 to 1996. He held the World Boxing Council (WBC) heavyweight title from 1995 to 1996. At the regional level, he held the European heavyweight title from 1985 to 1986. As an amateur, he won the ABA heavyweight title in 1980.

During his professional career, Bruno scored 40 wins and 5 losses, scoring 38 by knockouts, giving him a 95% knockout-to-win ratio; his overall knockout percentage was 84.44%. Bruno was ranked among BoxRec's 10 best heavyweights in the world twelve times, reaching his career-high ranking of world no. 3 at the conclusion of 1984.

Following retirement, Bruno became a television personality and entertainer. He was voted Sports Personality of the Year in 1989 and 1990 and he was awarded Most Excellent Order of the British Empire (MBE) in the 1990 New Years Honours List.

== Early life and amateur career ==
Bruno was born on 16 November 1961, in Hammersmith, London, England, and was the youngest of six children. He took up boxing aged 9 after joining the Wandsworth Boys Club. He attended at Oak Hall Community School in Heathfield, East Sussex, and joined the Sir Philip Game Amateur Boxing Club. He won 20 out of his 21 fights as an amateur, the only defeat by Irish International, Joe Christie. Bruno represented Young England at boxing, and achieved becoming the youngest ever ABA Heavyweight champion when he won the title in 1980 at the age of 18.

== Professional career ==
=== Early career ===
Bruno's first fight a professional boxer was a win against Lupe Guerra in March 1982 at the Royal Albert Hall, London, which he won by knock-out. He went on to achieve 21 consecutive wins by knockout. This streak caught the attention of international boxing magazines, such as The Ring, KO Magazine, Boxing Illustrated and Ring En Español. During this period Bruno stopped former world title contender Scott LeDoux in May 1983, the fringe contender Floyd Cummings in Oct 1983, Belgian champion Rudy Gauwe, British contenders Tony Moore, and Eddie Nielson, as well as cruiserweight contender Bill Sharkey, and some strong journeymen such as Walter Santemore and Ken Lakusta. However, in May 1984, that streak ended when Bruno was defeated by knockout in the tenth and final round of the bout, despite Bruno leading clearly on all three judges' cards, when losing to the up-and-coming future world heavyweight champion, American James "Bonecrusher" Smith.

=== European heavyweight title ===
To get a shot at the title, Bruno beat fringe fighter Jeff Jordan on 6 November 1984. Bruno was taken the distance for the first time in November 1984, by the useful world rated Phil Brown, He went on to fight former European champion and world title contender Lucien Rodriguez in March 1985, defeating him in one round. and Bruno became the EBU European Heavyweight Champion with a KO over Sweden's Anders Eklund, on 1 October 1985.

=== First World heavyweight title challenge ===
==== Bruno vs. Witherspoon ====
Bruno got back into title contention with a quick one-round KO win over former WBA champion Gerrie Coetzee of South Africa, and, in July 1986, he challenged Tim Witherspoon for the WBA heavyweight title. After once again leading on the cards for most of the fight, he ran out of steam and was defeated by knockout in round eleven.

Bruno once again got himself back into title contention with wins over former contender James Tillis and journeymen Reggie Gross and Chuck Gardner. In October 1987, Bruno faced the veteran Joe Bugner in an all-British match-up. Bugner, although long past his peak, was coming off good wins over Greg Page, James Tillis and David Bey. Bruno won by TKO in the 8th round, the referee stopping the bout.

=== Second World heavyweight title challenge ===
==== Bruno vs. Tyson ====
In February 1989, Bruno challenged Mike Tyson for the undisputed world heavyweight title. In the opening seconds, the fighters came together with huge punches, and Bruno was on the ropes. However, he recovered and continued, then rocked Tyson with a left hook, in the final moments of the first round. However, Tyson recovered and eventually overpowered Bruno, who was taking heavy punishment on the ropes when the referee stopped the contest in round five.

After the Tyson fight, Bruno did not fight for two years, needing surgery on a detached retina. The surgery having been successful, Bruno made his comeback and kept winning fights, helping him to retain his spot as one of the world's leading heavyweights. He defeated journeymen such as Jose Ribalta, Pierre Coetzer, Dutchman Jan Emmen and then contender Carl Williams.

=== Third World heavyweight title challenge ===
==== Bruno vs. Lewis ====
In 1993, he had a third world title chance against Lennox Lewis, who was making the second defence of the belt (his first of three championship reigns). The Lennox Lewis vs. Frank Bruno fight was the first time that two British boxers had fought for the world heavyweight title. Bruno failed to secure his title chance after being shaken by Lewis in the seventh round, and despite Bruno leading the contest on points at that time, the fight was stopped by the referee in favour of Lewis.

Bruno again regrouped, in his next fight dispatching Jesse Ferguson in one round, and fringe contenders Rodolfo Marin and Mike Evans early on, in his next two bouts.

=== WBC heavyweight champion ===
==== Bruno vs. McCall ====
On 2 September 1995, Bruno finally became world champion by outpointing WBC Champion Oliver McCall over twelve rounds. After an even start, Bruno built up a strong lead in the middle rounds before appearing to run somewhat out of steam in the last couple. However, unlike Bonecrusher Smith and Tim Witherspoon earlier in Bruno's career, McCall was unable to find a way through Bruno's defences to force the late stoppage he needed. Bruno won unanimously on points, only the second time he had taken an opponent to the judges.

==== Bruno vs. Tyson II ====
Bruno's reign as champion was brief: the contract he signed to get McCall meant he had to face Mike Tyson in his first defence. Tyson beat Bruno on a stoppage in round three, Bruno performed unusually poorly in what turned out to be his last bout as a professional due to the recurrence of an eye injury, originally caused during his first fight with Tyson, which had already necessitated experimental surgery to allow him to fight again after that defeat.

=== Retirement ===
After the second Tyson fight, Bruno was advised not to fight again to avoid running the risk of causing any more damage to his eye, which could result in permanent blindness. He retired soon afterwards.

During his career, Bruno scored 40 wins and 5 losses. He won 38 by knockouts, giving him a 95% knockout-to-win ratio; his overall knockout percentage was 84.44%. Bruno was ranked among BoxRec's 10 best heavyweights in the world twelve times, reaching his career-high ranking of world no. 3 at the conclusion of 1984.

He was awarded Most Excellent Order of the British Empire (MBE) in the 1990 New Years Honours List.

== Personal life ==
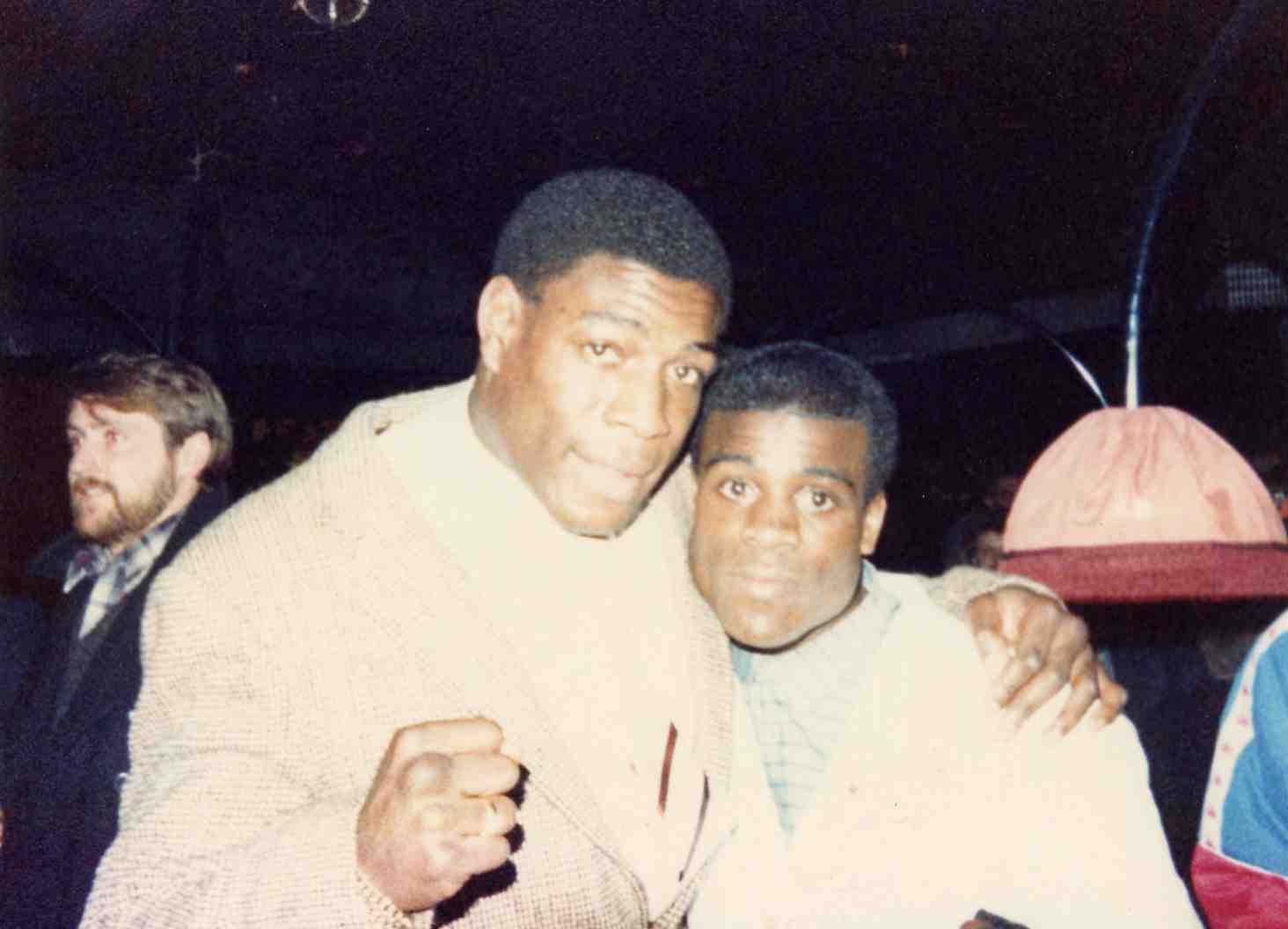
Bruno (left) and Errol Christie (right)

On 22 September 2003, Bruno was taken from his home near Brentwood in Essex by medical staff assisted by police officers, under the provisions of the Mental Health Act 1983. He was taken to Goodmayes Hospital in Ilford, where he underwent psychological and psychiatric tests. He had been suffering from depression for several months beforehand. He was later diagnosed as having bipolar disorder. On 9 October 2005, Bruno admitted that cocaine use, which began in 2000, had contributed to his mental health problems. Media coverage of Bruno's problems raised controversy, the principal accusations being gross intrusion and insensitivity. Particular criticism was aimed at The Sun, whose headline in the first editions the next day read "Bonkers Bruno Locked Up". Second editions retracted the headline and attempted to portray a more sympathetic attitude towards Bruno and mental health in general. As an attempt at atonement, the paper established a charity fund for people suffering from mental illness, although some mental health charities condemned The Sun's latter action that day as being grossly hypocritical in the light of the former. On 24 February 2008, Bruno offered his support to former footballer Paul Gascoigne, who on 21 February had been sectioned under the Mental Health Act. Bruno also spoke on his own personal experiences in the mental health system at a conference run by Hari Sewell, on 22 June 2009. Bruno was sectioned again in 2012 and taken to St Andrew's Hospital in Northampton for five weeks. In December 2013, Bruno spoke to the Daily Mirror in support of their mental health campaign, stating: "Mental illness is a terrible thing to have to cope with but I've learnt it's a fight you can win if you live your life the right way".

In December 2005, Bruno announced that he was to become a father for the fourth time since finding new romance with old friend Yvonne Clydesdale. The couple, who first met five years previously at a health resort, began dating months after bumping into each other at a wine bar near his home. Yvonne gave birth to baby Freya on 10 May 2006. On 10 October 2006, Bruno and Clydesdale were jointly awarded £50,000 damages for libel against The People newspaper and publishers MGN in respect of false claims made about their relationship. In 2006, Bruno published an autobiography Frank: Fighting Back. It won the Best Autobiography category of the British Sports Book Awards. As of May 2012, Bruno was living in Glasgow with his new hairdresser girlfriend, Nina Coletta in the Gorbals area of the city.

After retirement from boxing, Bruno has spent much of his time supporting The Frank Bruno Foundation, dedicated to improving the mental health of men around the world.

In 2025, his daughter Rachel appeared as a contender in the second series of Gladiators, citing her father's sporting success as being the inspiration for her participating.

== Media appearances and non-boxing interests ==
Bruno's image was enhanced by his relationship with the BBC boxing commentator Harry Carpenter, from which, in their many interviews, his most-quoted phrase, "Know what I mean, Harry?" originated. He appeared on Comic Relief programmes in the early 1980s and made frequent appearances thereafter on television and on stage (in pantomime).

In 1985 Bruno lent his name to the home computer game Frank Bruno's Boxing for the ZX Spectrum, Commodore 64 and Amstrad CPC. Released by Elite Systems, it was an unofficial clone of Nintendo's arcade game Super Punch-Out!!. The game was later re-released as Frank Bruno's World Championship Boxing to coincide with the first Bruno-Tyson title fight.

In 1991, he opened "The Ultimate" at Lightwater Valley, which was, at the time, the longest roller coaster in the world. In 1995, the year of his world championship, he released a cover version of "Eye of the Tiger". It reached No. 28 in the UK charts. In 1999, he featured on the celebrity special in the second season of Fort Boyard.

In January 2001, prior to that year's general election, Bruno announced that he wanted to stand as the Conservative candidate for the Conservative seat of Brentwood and Ongar against the independent Member of Parliament, Martin Bell. His proposed slogan was "Don't be a plank, vote for Frank!" However, this idea was quickly dismissed by Conservative Central Office. In 2006, he was one of a number of celebrities including Geoff Hurst and Bill Pertwee, who recorded the World Cup song, "Who Do You Think You Are Kidding Jurgen Klinsmann?".

On 15 August 2009, he beat Duke McKenzie in the final of The Weakest Link - "Boxing Special", competing against the likes of Barry McGuigan, and John Conteh. He had a small role in the 2008 British crime drama Cass. Bruno made brief guest appearances in episodes of the ITV comedy show, Harry Hill's TV Burp in February and October 2011. In 2011, he made a guest appearance in Sooty. On 20 April 2012, Bruno was featured in the ITV series Piers Morgan's Life Stories.

He supports West Ham United F.C. whilst also having an affinity for the Scottish team, Aberdeen F.C.

Bruno completed the 2011 London Marathon, which is the third marathon he has run successfully. He has also run half marathons. Bruno regularly makes personal appearances and also sells autographed items of memorabilia. On 23 July 2013, Bruno was featured in the BBC Three documentary with his daughter Rachel in Rachel Bruno: My Dad and Me.

In 2020, amid the COVID-19 crisis, Frank Bruno joined a group of celebrities called The Celebs, which included Kellie Shirley and X Factor winner Sam Bailey to raise money for both Alzheimer's Society and Action for Children. They recorded a new rendition of "Merry Christmas Everyone" by Shakin' Stevens and it was released digitally on 11 December 2020, on independent record label Saga Entertainment. The music video debuted on Good Morning Britain the day before release. The song peaked at number two on the iTunes pop chart.

In 2024, Bruno joined fellow London boxers – Lennox Lewis, Nigel Benn and Chris Eubank for Four Kings television mini documentary.

== Professional boxing record ==
45 fights	40 wins	5 losses
By knockout	38	5
By decision	2	0

No.	Result	Record	Opponent	Type	Round, time	Date	Location	Notes
45	Loss	40–5	Mike Tyson	TKO	3 (12), 0:50	16 Mar 1996	MGM Grand Garden Arena, Paradise, Nevada, US	Lost WBC heavyweight title
44	Win	40–4	Oliver McCall	UD	12	2 Sep 1995	Wembley Stadium, London, England	Won WBC heavyweight title
43	Win	39–4	Mike Evans	KO	2 (10), 3:05	13 May 1995	Kelvin Hall, Glasgow, Scotland	
42	Win	38–4	Rodolfo Marin	KO	1 (10), 1:05	18 Feb 1995	Bath & West Country Showground, Shepton Mallet, England	
41	Win	37–4	Jesse Ferguson	TKO	1 (10), 2:22	16 Mar 1994	National Exhibition Centre, Birmingham, England	
40	Loss	36–4	Lennox Lewis	TKO	7 (12), 1:12	1 Oct 1993	National Stadium, Cardiff, Wales	For WBC heavyweight title
39	Win	36–3	Carl Williams	TKO	10 (10), 0:29	24 Apr 1993	National Exhibition Centre, Birmingham, England	
38	Win	35–3	Pierre Coetzer	TKO	8 (10)	17 Oct 1992	Wembley Arena, London, England	
37	Win	34–3	Jose Ribalta	KO	2 (10), 1:44	22 Apr 1992	Wembley Arena, London, England	
36	Win	33–3	John Emmen	TKO	1 (10), 3:00	20 Nov 1991	Royal Albert Hall, London, England	
35	Loss	32–3	Mike Tyson	TKO	5 (12), 2:55	25 Feb 1989	Las Vegas Hilton, Winchester, Nevada, US	For WBA, WBC, IBF, and The Ring heavyweight titles
34	Win	32–2	Joe Bugner	TKO	8 (10), 3:00	24 Oct 1987	White Hart Lane, London, England	
33	Win	31–2	Reggie Gross	TKO	8 (10)	30 Aug 1987	Nueva Andalucia Bullring, Marbella, Spain	
32	Win	30–2	Chuck Gardner	TKO	1 (10), 0:55	27 Jun 1987	Palais des Festivals et des Congres, Cannes, France	
31	Win	29–2	James Tillis	TKO	5 (10), 1:57	24 Mar 1987	Wembley Arena, London, England	
30	Loss	28–2	Tim Witherspoon	TKO	11 (15), 2:57	19 Jul 1986	Wembley Stadium, London, England	For WBA heavyweight title
29	Win	28–1	Gerrie Coetzee	KO	1 (10), 1:50	4 Mar 1986	Wembley Arena, London, England	
28	Win	27–1	Larry Frazier	KO	2 (10), 2:14	4 Dec 1985	Royal Albert Hall, London, England	
27	Win	26–1	Anders Eklund	KO	4 (12), 0:20	1 Oct 1985	Wembley Arena, London, England	Won European heavyweight title
26	Win	25–1	Lucien Rodriguez	TKO	1 (10), 2:39	26 Mar 1985	Wembley Arena, London, England	
25	Win	24–1	Phillip Brown	PTS	10	27 Nov 1984	Wembley Arena, London, England	
24	Win	23–1	Jeff Jordan	TKO	3 (10), 1:50	6 Nov 1984	Royal Albert Hall, London, England	
23	Win	22–1	Ken Lakusta	KO	2 (10)	25 Sep 1984	Wembley Arena, London, England	
22	Loss	21–1	James Smith	KO	10 (10)	13 May 1984	Wembley Arena, London, England	
21	Win	21–0	Juan Antonio Figueroa	TKO	1 (10), 0:57	13 Mar 1984	Wembley Arena, London, England	
20	Win	20–0	Walter Santemore	KO	4 (10), 0:50	6 Dec 1983	Royal Albert Hall, London, England	
19	Win	19–0	Floyd Cummings	TKO	7 (10), 2:43	11 Oct 1983	Royal Albert Hall, London, England	
18	Win	18–0	Bill Sharkey	KO	1 (10), 2:08	27 Sep 1983	Wembley Arena, London, England	
17	Win	17–0	Mike Jameson	KO	2 (10), 1:30	9 Jul 1983	DiVinci Manor, Chicago, Illinois, US	
16	Win	16–0	Barry Funches	TKO	5 (10), 0:52	31 May 1983	Royal Albert Hall, London, England	
15	Win	15–0	Scott LeDoux	TKO	3 (10), 1:35	3 May 1983	Wembley Arena, London, England	
14	Win	14–0	Eddie Neilson	TKO	3 (10), 0:25	5 Apr 1983	Royal Albert Hall, London, England	
13	Win	13–0	Winston Allen	TKO	2 (10), 1:25	1 Mar 1983	Royal Albert Hall, London, England	
12	Win	12–0	Peter Mulindwa Kozza	KO	3 (10), 1:37	8 Feb 1983	Royal Albert Hall, London, England	
11	Win	11–0	Stewart Lithgo	RTD	4 (8), 3:00	18 Jan 1983	Royal Albert Hall, London, England	
10	Win	10–0	Gilberto Acuna	TKO	1 (10), 0:40	7 Dec 1982	Royal Albert Hall, London, England	
9	Win	9–0	George Butzbach	TKO	1 (8), 2:00	23 Nov 1982	Wembley Arena, London, England	
8	Win	8–0	Rudy Gauwe	KO	2 (8), 0:20	9 Nov 1982	Royal Albert Hall, London, England	
7	Win	7–0	Ali Lukasa	TKO	2 (8)	23 Oct 1982	Berlin, Germany	
6	Win	6–0	George Scott	TKO	1 (8), 2:42	14 Sep 1982	Wembley Arena, London, England	
5	Win	5–0	Tony Moore	TKO	2 (8)	1 Jun 1982	Royal Albert Hall, London, England	
4	Win	4–0	Ronald Gibbs	TKO	4 (8)	4 May 1982	Wembley Arena, London, England	
3	Win	3–0	Abdul Muhaymin	KO	1 (8), 2:25	20 Apr 1982	Royal Albert Hall, London, England	
2	Win	2–0	Harvey Steichen	TKO	2 (8), 2:30	30 Mar 1982	Wembley Arena, London, England	
1	Win	1–0	Lupe Guerra	KO	1 (8)	17 Mar 1982	Royal Albert Hall, London, England	

Sporting positions
Amateur boxing titles
Previous: Andy Palmer	ABA heavyweight champion 1980	Next: Adrian Elliott
Regional boxing titles
Preceded by Anders Eklund	European heavyweight champion 1 October 1985 – July 1986; Vacated	Vacant Title next held by Steffen Tangstad
World boxing titles
Preceded by Oliver McCall	WBC heavyweight champion 2 September 1995 – 16 March 1996	Succeeded by Mike Tyson
