= José Ribalta =

Cuban boxer (born 1963)

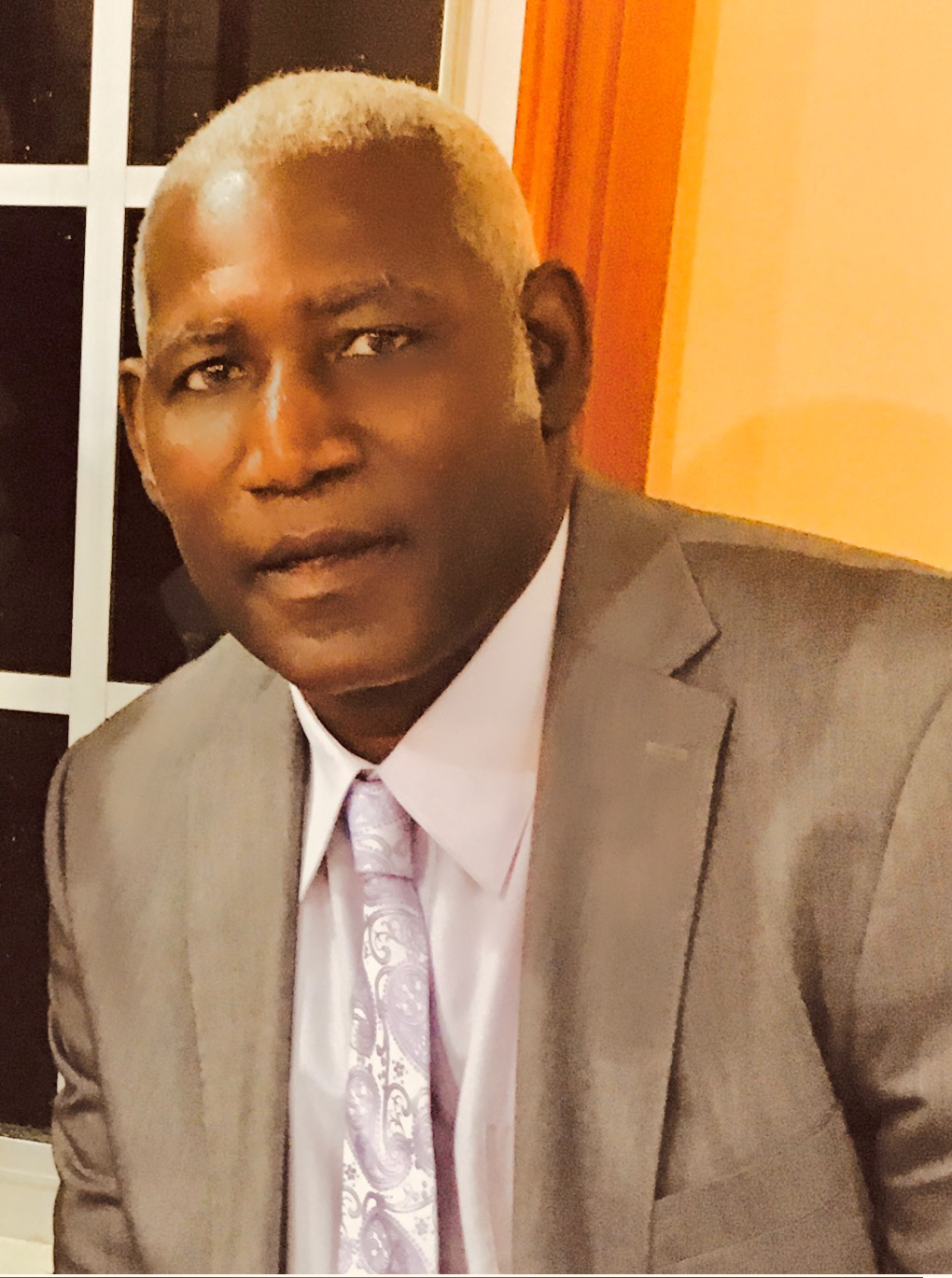

Personal information
- Nickname: El Niño
- Born: José Manuel Ribalta; March 31, 1963 (age 63) Rodrigo, Cuba
- Height: 6 ft 6 in (1.98 m)
- Weight: Heavyweight

Boxing career
- Reach: 80 in (203 cm)
- Stance: Orthodox

Boxing record
- Total fights: 56
- Wins: 38
- Win by KO: 27
- Losses: 17
- Draws: 1

José Manuel Ribalta (born March 31, 1963) is a Cuban former professional boxer who competed in the heavyweight division from 1982 to 1999. A talented and physically imposing gatekeeper (6 ft 6 in tall with 80 in reach), Ribalta is best known for his fight against Mike Tyson in 1986.

Beside Tyson, Ribalta faced many notable fighters during the peak of his career, among which he had beaten former undisputed heavyweight world champion Leon Spinks by 1st round stoppage, lost to Frank Bruno also by stoppage, and was closely outpointed by Larry Holmes, Tim Witherspoon, Tony Tubbs, Michael Dokes and (controversially) James "Bonecrusher" Smith. Nearing retirement, he was stopped by Vitali Klitschko, Chris Byrd and Donovan "Razor" Ruddock.

== Early life ==
Ribalta's family fled Cuba by way of the Freedom Flights in 1967 and settled in Adams Morgan area of Washington, D.C. Then four years later the family moved to Miami, the city with the largest Cuban diaspora outside of Cuba. Both of his older brothers (all three were named José) were boxers. The oldest brother (the first to move to the United States) competed in the welterweight division and had three professional fights in the US. The middle of the three brothers was a boxer in Cuba, where he faced Teófilo Stevenson three times in the amateur ring and lost to him three times, and also fought Aziz Salihu. The younger José started boxing in the United States in the mid-1970s. He did not go through the Cuban school, but became the best known of the Ribalta brothers.

== Professional career ==
Ribalta made his professional debut in 1982. He had 10 straight wins. In 1983, he lost to Ricardo Richardson by TKO in the 7th round. Then Ribalta won another 7 fights. Advancing on the list of professional boxing rankings, Ribalta made his living as a sparring partner for WBC champion Trevor Berbick and title contender Gerry Cooney.

In July 1985, his first nationally televised bout took place against James "Bonecrusher" Smith. Ribalta lost by a split decision. The audience was loudly outraged by the decision of the judges, and Ribalta considered that he was "robbed". In September 1985, Ribalta faced Marvis Frazier. After a close battle, Frazier won the fight by a majority decision. In May 1986, he was knocked down by David Jaco, but managed to turn the tide of the fight and won by knockout in the fifth round.

On 17 August 1986, Ribalta faced Mike Tyson in a fight broadcast on HBO prepaid at the Trump Plaza Hotel and Casino in Atlantic City. At the time of the fight, Ribalta was ranked #10 in the WBC ranking. In the fight, Ribalta was knocked down three times and eventually lost by TKO in the 10th round, when the fight was stopped after Tyson's next series of strikes landed on Ribalta, who was pressed against the ropes. Tyson hit Ribalta 220 times. In 2014, Tyson rated Ribalta as the strongest opponent he faced, and the one with the best chin.

In 1987, Ribalta defeated Leon Spinks, knocking him down three times in the first round. Then he defeated Mark Young and Steve Zouski.

In 1990, Ribalta faced Tim Witherspoon and lost by majority decision.

In 1991, he lost to Bruce Seldon and Pierre Coetzer.

In April 1992, he was knocked out by Frank Bruno in the 2nd round. In October 1992, Ribalta faced Michael Dokes and lost by unanimous decision.

In September 1993, he lost against Larry Holmes by unanimous decision. In December 1993, Ribalta lost a unanimous decision in a 3-round bout against Tony Tubbs in a national heavyweight tournament in the Bay Saint Louis, Mississippi.

In 1994, Ribalta lost against Joe Hipp by knockout in the 2nd round. Then he won five fights, which were followed by losses against Axel Schulz, Larry Donald, Vitali Klitschko, and Chris Byrd.

In 1999, Ribalta lost by knockout in the 1st round against Donovan Ruddock, after which he retired from professional boxing.

He was inducted into the Florida Boxing Hall of Fame in 2014.

Ribalta is the author of “Courage In The Ring“, his autobiography of his life as a professional athlete.

== Professional boxing record ==
56 fights	38 wins	17 losses
By knockout	27	9
By decision	10	8
By disqualification	1	0
Draws	1	

No.	Result	Record	Opponent	Type	Round, time	Date	Location	Notes
56	Loss	38–17–1	Donovan Ruddock	TKO	1 (10), 1:40	Oct 8, 1999	Turning Stone Resort Casino, Verona, New York, U.S.	
55	Loss	38–16–1	Chris Byrd	RTD	3 (10), 3:00	Jun 3, 1999	Soaring Eagle Casino & Resort, Mount Pleasant, Michigan, U.S.	
54	Loss	38–15–1	Vitali Klitschko	TKO	2 (8), 2:13	Jun 5, 1998	Sporthalle Wandsbek, Hamburg, Germany	
53	Loss	38–14–1	Larry Donald	TKO	6 (10)	Jul 15, 1997	Riverside Convention Center, Rochester, New York	
52	Loss	38–13–1	Axel Schulz	UD	10	Dec 7, 1996	Vienna, Austria	
51	Win	38–12–1	James Holley	TKO	1 (10)	Apr 6, 1996	Peel's Palace, Erlanger, Kentucky, U.S.	
50	Win	37–12–1	Bruce Johnson	KO	1 (10)	Dec 9, 1995	MARK of the Quad Cities, Moline, Illinois, U.S.	
49	Win	36–12–1	Carlton West	TKO	1 (10)	Oct 11, 1995	International Ballroom, Washington, D.C., U.S.	
48	Win	35–12–1	George Harris	TKO	2 (10)	Sep 22, 1995	Mountaineer Casino, Racetrack and Resort, Chester, West Virginia, U.S.	
47	Win	34–12–1	John Basil Jackson	PTS	8 (10)	Mar 15, 1995	Harmarville, Pennsylvania, U.S.	
46	Loss	33–12–1	Joe Hipp	KO	2 (12), 1:53	May 10, 1994	Mashantucket, Connecticut, U.S.	For NABF heavyweight title
45	Loss	33–11–1	Tony Tubbs	UD	3	Dec 3, 1993	Casino Magic, Bay St. Louis, Mississippi, U.S.	
44	Win	33–10–1	Derek Williams	SD	3	Dec 3, 1993	Casino Magic, Bay St. Louis, Mississippi, U.S.	
43	Loss	32–10–1	Larry Holmes	UD	10	Sep 28, 1993	Casino Magic, Bay St. Louis, Mississippi, U.S.	
42	Win	32–9–1	Wes Turner	TKO	4	Jul 10, 1993	Fernwood Resort, Bushkill, Pennsylvania, U.S.	
41	Loss	31-9–1	Michael Dokes	UD	10	Oct 6, 1992	Mahi Shrine Temple, Miami Beach, Florida, U.S.	
40	Loss	31–8–1	Frank Bruno	KO	2 (10), 1:44	Apr 22, 1992	Wembley Arena, London, England	
39	Loss	31–7–1	Pierre Coetzer	PTS	10	May 11, 1991	Biloxi, Mississippi, U.S.	
38	Loss	31–6–1	Bruce Seldon	RTD	3 (10), 3:00	Jan 11, 1991	Etess Arena, Atlantic City, New Jersey, U.S.	
37	Loss	31–5–1	Tim Witherspoon	MD	10	Jul 19, 1990	Kingdome, Seattle, Washington, U.S.	
36	Win	31–4–1	Michael Johnson	KO	2	Feb 9, 1990	Palacio de los Deportes, Zaragoza, Spain	
35	Win	30–4–1	Jose Allencastro	KO	2	Oct 6, 1989	Zaragoza, Spain	
34	Win	29–4–1	Jeff Sims	UD	10	Jul 21, 1989	Convention Center, Atlantic City, New Jersey, U.S.	
33	Win	28–4–1	Jerry Hairston	KO	1	Jun 2, 1989	Holiday Inn, Parkersburg, West Virginia, U.S.	
32	Win	27–4–1	Jose Garcia	KO	1	Jun 3, 1988	Raleigh County Armory, Beckley, West Virginia, U.S.	
31	Win	26-4-1	Steve Zouski	UD	10	Sep 12, 1987	James L. Knight Center, Miami Beach, Florida, U.S.	
30	Win	25–4–1	Mark Young	UD	10	May 16, 1987	Convention Center, Miami Beach, Florida, U.S.	
29	Win	24–4–1	Leon Spinks	TKO	1 (10), 2:10	Jan 17, 1987	Coconut Grove Convention Center, Miami, Florida, U.S.	
28	Win	23–4–1	John Williams	TKO	2 (10), 0:50	Sep 26, 1986	Abel Holtz Stadium, Miami Beach, Florida, U.S.	
27	Loss	22–4–1	Mike Tyson	TKO	10 (10), 1:37	Aug 17, 1986	Trump Plaza Hotel and Casino, Atlantic City, New Jersey, U.S.	
26	Win	22–3–1	Rick Kellar	KO	1 (10)	Jun 20, 1986	Milander Auditorium, Hialeah, Florida, U.S.	
25	Win	21–3–1	David Jaco	KO	5 (10)	May 13, 1986	Bloomington, Minnesota, U.S.	
24	Win	20–3–1	Jeff Freeney	KO	1 (10)	Apr 4, 1986	Convention Center, Coconut Grove, Florida, U.S.	
23	Win	19–3–1	Al Houck	KO	3 (10)	Mar 4, 1986	Auditorium, Coconut Grove, Florida, U.S.	
22	Loss	18–3–1	Marvis Frazier	MD	10	Sep 11, 1985	Trump Casino Hotel, Atlantic City, New Jersey, U.S.	
21	Win	18–2–1	Ernie Barr	UD	10	Jul 23, 1985	Convention Center, Miami Beach, Florida, U.S.	
20	Loss	17–2–1	James Smith	SD	10	Apr 29, 1985	Memorial Auditorium, Buffalo, New York, U.S.	
19	Draw	17–1–1	Cecil Coffee	PTS	10	Oct 18, 1984	Atlantis Hotel & Casino, Atlantic City, New Jersey, U.S.	
18	Win	17–1	Nate Robinson	TKO	2 (8)	Jul 26, 1984	Convention Center, Miami Beach, Florida, U.S.	
17	Win	16–1	Jimmy Jones	PTS	8	Mar 8, 1984	James Knight Convention Center, Miami, Florida, U.S.	
16	Win	15–1	Juan Antonio Figueroa	DQ	7 (10)	Dec 15, 1983	Resorts International, Atlantic City, New Jersey, U.S.	
15	Win	14–1	Ishaq Hussein	TKO	6 (6)	Oct 25, 1983	Playboy Hotel and Casino, Atlantic City, New Jersey, U.S.	
14	Win	13–1	Robert Evans	UD	8	Sep 1, 1983	Resorts International, Atlantic City, New Jersey, U.S.	
13	Win	12–1	Tom Prater	UD	8	Jun 3, 1983	Milander Auditorium, Hialeah, Florida, U.S.	
12	Win	11–1	Ron Harry	TKO	6 (8)	Apr 29, 1983	Ventura Skating Center, Hialeah, Florida, U.S.	
11	Loss	10–1	Ricardo Richardson	TKO	7 (10)	Feb 18, 1983	Milander Auditorium, Hialeah, Florida, U.S.	
10	Win	10–0	Miles Prince	TKO	2	Jan 14, 1983	Milander Auditorium, Hialeah, Florida, U.S.	
9	Win	9–0	Nate Robinson	TKO	5	Nov 6, 1982	War Memorial Auditorium, Fort Lauderdale, Florida, U.S.	
8	Win	8–0	John L Johnson	KO	1	Oct 21, 1982	Ventura Skating Center, Hialeah, Florida, U.S.	
7	Win	7–0	Al Leticky	KO	1 (8)	Sep 30, 1982	Ventura Skating Center, Hialeah, Florida, U.S.	
6	Win	6–0	Curtis Gaskins	TKO	2 (6)	Jul 20, 1982	War Memorial Auditorium, Fort Lauderdale, Florida, U.S.	
5	Win	5–0	Gabriel Saenz	KO	2 (6)	Jul 9, 1982	Milander Auditorium, Hialeah, Florida, U.S.	
4	Win	4–0	Kenneth Wring	KO	3 (6)	Jun 18, 1982	Milander Auditorium, Hialeah, Florida, U.S.	
3	Win	3–0	Ken Davis	UD	4	May 21, 1982	Convention Center, Miami Beach, Florida, U.S.	
2	Win	2–0	Douglas Fowler	KO	2 (4)	Feb 5, 1982	North Miami Beach Auditorium, Miami Beach, Florida, U.S.	
1	Win	1–0	J C Richardson	TKO	1 (4)	Jan 20, 1982	War Memorial Auditorium, Fort Lauderdale, Florida, U.S.	
