= Tony Tubbs =

American boxer

Personal information
- Nickname: TNT
- Born: February 15, 1958 (age 68) Cincinnati, Ohio, U.S.
- Height: 190 cm (6 ft 3 in)
- Weight: Heavyweight

Boxing career
- Reach: 79 in (201 cm)
- Stance: Orthodox

Boxing record
- Total fights: 59
- Wins: 47
- Win by KO: 25
- Losses: 10
- No contests: 2
Medal record
World Cup
Gold medal – first place	1979 New York	Heavyweight

Tony Tubbs (born February 15, 1958) is an American former professional boxer who competed from 1980 to 2006, and held the WBA heavyweight world title from 1985 to 1986.

== Amateur career ==
As an amateur, Tony Tubbs competed in 253 bouts, compiling a record of 240 wins and 13 losses—primarily in the heavyweight division. In a 1976 match between the USSR and the United States, Tubbs lost by knockout in the second round to future Soviet Heavyweight Champion Igor Vysotsky.

In 1978 Tubbs lost in the quarterfinals of the world Cup to Cuban boxer Teofilo Stevenson. Tubbs was the only opponent who managed to go the distance with Stevenson. Tubbs trained with the Muhammad Ali Amateur Boxing Team in Santa Monica, CA. In 1979, Tubbs became the National AAU Heavyweight Champion by defeating Mitch Green and Greg Page, both contests were rematches of previous defeats. In the match-up meetings USSR versus the United States Tubbs defeated the two-time amateur European champion Yevgeni Gorstkov and the future silver medalist of the Olympic games Pyotr Zayev. In 1979 Tubbs won the AIBA Boxing World Cup, defeating Khoren Indzhyan, and finally avenged his loss to Marvis Frazier, who prior to that upset went unbeaten with a 42–0 (21 KOs) record. Tony fought as a member of the Muhammad Ali Amateur Boxing Team.

By 1980 the conclusion of Tubbs's amateur career was the Olympic Games, but Tubbs was unable compete due to the US boycott of the 1980 Moscow Olympic Games. Among his other notable Amateur victories were defeating James Broad and Jimmy Clark, and 1980 Olympic bronze medalist Stephen Left. As an amateur, Tubbs worked as a sparring partner to Muhammad Ali, helping the former to prepare for his rematch with Leon Spinks for the World Heavyweight Championship.

=== Highlights ===
1976: USA–USSR Duals, Sahara Hotel Space Center, Las Vegas, Nevada (Heavyweight)

- Lost to Igor Vysotsky (Soviet Union) RSC 2

1977: USA–USSR Duals, Milwaukee, Wisconsin (Heavyweight)

- Defeated Pyotr Zayev (Soviet Union) by decision

1977: National Golden Gloves, Honolulu, Hawaii (Heavyweight)

- 1/2: Lost to Jimmy Clark by decision

1978: National Sports Festival, Fort Carson (Heavyweight)

- Finals: Lost to Mitch Green by decision

1978: United States National Championships, Biloxi, Mississippi (Heavyweight)

- 1/2: Defeated Woody Clark by decision
- Finals: Lost to Greg Page by decision

1978: World Championships, Belgrade, Yugoslavia (Heavyweight):

- 1/8: Defeated Istvan Levai (Hungary) by unanimous decision, 5–0
- 1/4: Lost to Teófilo Stevenson (Cuba) by unanimous decision, 0–5

1979: USA–USSR Duals, Las Vegas, Nevada (Heavyweight)

- Defeated Yevgeniy Gorstkov (Soviet Union) by decision

(gold) 1979: National Golden Gloves (Heavyweight)

- (no data available)

(gold) 1979: United States National Championships, Lake Charles, Louisiana (Heavyweight)

- Finals: Defeated Phillip Brown

1979: Frazier–Ali teams match-up, Atlantic City, New Jersey

- Lost to Marvis Frazier by decision

(gold) 1979: World Cup, Madison Square Garden, New York City (Heavyweight):

- 1/4: Defeated Narciso Maldonado (Puerto Rico) KO 1
- 1/2: Defeated Luk Tchoula (Gabon) KO 3
- Finals: Defeated Khoren Indzhyan (USSR) by unanimous decision, 5–0

1980: Frazier–Ali teams match-up, Houston, Texas (Heavyweight):

- Defeated Marvis Frazier by decision

Tubbs finished his career having 253 fights, with a record of 240 wins, 13 losses.

== Professional career ==
=== Early years ===
Tubbs made his professional debut on June 14, 1980, with a first-round knockout of Bruce Scott. After 11 fights, he fought fellow undefeated prospect Clarence Hill on August 7, 1982, and won by a ten-round unanimous decision. After out-pointing Jimmy Young (who had defeated George Foreman) on April 10, 1983, he was signed by Don King and began rising up the rankings while appearing on several King undercards. On March 15, 1985, he faced future WBA heavyweight champion James "Bonecrusher" Smith in a WBA title eliminator. Tubbs won by a unanimous decision, taking his record to 20–0 (15 KOs).

=== World heavyweight title fights ===
On April 29, 1985, Tubbs challenged Greg Page for the WBA heavyweight world title. Page and Tubbs fought seven times as amateurs, with Page winning six of them, but for their only meeting as professionals, Tubbs won by a fifteen-round unanimous decision. On January 17, 1986, Tubbs made his first title defense against former WBC heavyweight champion Tim Witherspoon. Tubbs weighed-in at 244 pounds (111 kg), 15 more than he weighed for the Page fight, and lost the title by a fifteen-round majority decision.

Tubbs and Witherspoon had a rematch scheduled for December 12, 1986, but Tubbs pulled out of the fight and was replaced by Bonecrusher Smith, who knocked Witherspoon out in the first round. Tubbs said he had an injured shoulder, but promoter Don King accused Tubbs of trying to get more money. On March 21, 1988, Tubbs challenged Mike Tyson for the undisputed world heavyweight championship; after out-boxing Tyson in the first round, Tubbs was knocked out in the second.

On November 21, 1989, Tubbs out-pointed top contender Orlin Norris, winning the North American Boxing Federation title. However, Tubbs failed two post-fight drugs tests, testing positive for cocaine. Tubbs was stripped of the title and the victory was changed to a no contest.

On April 20, 1991, a 34-year-old Tubbs lost a highly controversial ten-round decision to future undisputed world heavyweight Champion, Riddick Bowe. The general consensus in the media was that Tubbs had easily outboxed Bowe. On August 8, 1992, Tubbs was upset by Lionel Butler in a first-round knockout. Tubbs came back to out-point future WBA heavyweight champion Bruce Seldon, knocking him down in the 1st round, and beating undefeated Alexander Zolkin by unanimous decision, but then suffered another first-round knockout—this one to clubfighter Jimmy Ellis.

=== People's Choice Heavyweight Tournament ===
In December 1993, Tubbs took part in the one-night People's Choice Heavyweight Tournament in Bay Saint Louis, Mississippi. He knocked out Willie Jackson in the first round and won three-round decisions over 1984 Olympic gold medalist Tyrell Biggs, Jose Ribalta, and Daniel Dăncuţă to win the tournament. Depending on pay-per-view revenue, he had a chance to win $1 million. He was paid $170,000.

=== Late career ===
From 1994 to 1997, Tubbs went 3–3 with one no-contest. He retired but came back in 2002. He lost two of his first three comeback fights, but then won his next five, including a win over 18–0 Brian Minto. His last fight was a six-round unanimous decision over clubfighter Adam Smith on November 4, 2006.

== California Boxing Hall of Fame ==
Tubbs was inducted into the California Boxing Hall of Fame on June 25, 2011, in Studio City, CA. Tubbs attended the induction with his family, mother and children.

== Professional boxing record ==
59 fights	47 wins	10 losses
By knockout	25	5
By decision	21	5
By disqualification	1	0
No contests	2	

No.	Result	Record	Opponent	Type	Round, time	Date	Location	Notes
59	Win	47–10 (2)	Adam Smith	UD	6	Nov 4, 2006	Waterfront Place Hotel, Morgantown, West Virginia, U.S.	
58	Win	46–10 (2)	Jason Waller	TKO	7 (8), 2:05	Aug 6, 2006	Grand Victoria Casino & Resort, Rising Sun, Indiana, U.S.	
57	Win	45–10 (2)	Danny Wofford	UD	6	Feb 25, 2005	Municipal Auditorium, Nashville, Tennessee, U.S.	
56	Win	44–10 (2)	Brian Minto	SD	10	Dec 30, 2004	Mountaineer Casino Racetrack and Resort, Chester, West Virginia, U.S.	Won West Virginia heavyweight title
55	Win	43–10 (2)	Brian Sargent	TKO	1 (6), 1:25	Oct 29, 2004	Civic Arena, St. Joseph, Missouri, U.S.	
54	Loss	42–10 (2)	Abraham Okine	TKO	8 (10), 2:20	Jul 25, 2003	Lakeview Resort, Morgantown, West Virginia, U.S.	
53	Loss	42–9 (2)	Gilbert Martinez	UD	10	Jan 17, 2003	Palace Indian Gaming Center, Lemoore, California, U.S.	
52	Win	42–8 (2)	Michael Shanks	TKO	2 (4), 0:52	Mar 26, 2002	Cumberland Place Exhibition Center, West Lafayette, Indiana, U.S.	
51	Win	41–8 (2)	Mario Oscar Melo	KO	5 (10)	Aug 30, 1997	Estadio Polideportivo Islas Malvinas, Mar del Plata, Argentina	
50	Loss	40–8 (2)	Brian Nielsen	RTD	3 (10)	Oct 20, 1995	Circus Building, Copenhagen, Denmark	
49	Loss	40–7 (2)	Alexander Zolkin	MD	12	Aug 25, 1995	Bally's Park Place, Atlantic City, New Jersey, U.S.	For NABF heavyweight title
48	Win	40–6 (2)	Andre Crowder	KO	1 (10), 2:48	Mar 29, 1995	Myrl H. Shoemaker Center, Cincinnati, Ohio, U.S.	
47	Loss	39–6 (2)	Jimmy Thunder	PTS	12	Dec 6, 1994	The Palace, Auburn Hills, Michigan, U.S.	For IBO heavyweight title
46	NC	39–5 (2)	William Morris	UD	10	Oct 4, 1994	The Palace, Auburn Hills, Michigan, U.S.	Originally a UD win for Tubbs, later ruled an NC
45	Win	39–5 (1)	Everett Martin	UD	10	Feb 22, 1994	The Palace, Auburn Hills, Michigan, U.S.	
44	Win	38–5 (1)	Willie Jackson	UD	3	Dec 3, 1993	Casino Magic, Bay St. Louis, Mississippi, U.S.	
43	Win	37–5 (1)	Tyrell Biggs	UD	3	Dec 3, 1993	Casino Magic, Bay St. Louis, Mississippi, U.S.	
42	Win	36–5 (1)	Jose Ribalta	UD	3	Dec 3, 1993	Casino Magic, Bay St. Louis, Mississippi, U.S.	
41	Win	35–5 (1)	Daniel Dăncuță	UD	3	Dec 3, 1993	Casino Magic, Bay St. Louis, Mississippi, U.S.	
40	Loss	34–5 (1)	Jimmy Ellis	KO	1	Aug 16, 1993	Boise, Idaho, U.S.	Not Jimmy Ellis the former WBA world heavyweight champion
39	Win	34–4 (1)	Melton Bowen	UD	10	Apr 27, 1993	The Palace, Auburn Hills, Michigan, U.S.	
38	Win	33–4 (1)	Alexander Zolkin	UD	10	Feb 2, 1993	The Palace, Auburn Hills, Michigan, U.S.	
37	Win	32–4 (1)	Jesse Ferguson	UD	10	Nov 24, 1992	The Palace, Auburn Hills, Michigan, U.S.	
36	Win	31–4 (1)	Bruce Seldon	UD	10	Oct 14, 1992	Broadway by the Bay Theater, Atlantic City, New Jersey, U.S.	
35	Loss	30–4 (1)	Lionel Butler	KO	1 (10), 3:00	Aug 18, 1992	Bayfront Plaza Auditorium, Pensacola, Florida, U.S.	
34	Win	30–3 (1)	Leon Taylor	TKO	8 (10), 1:07	Feb 16, 1992	Las Vegas Hilton, Winchester, Nevada, U.S.	
33	Loss	29–3 (1)	Riddick Bowe	UD	10	Apr 20, 1991	Broadway by the Bay Theater, Atlantic City, New Jersey, U.S.	
32	Win	29–2 (1)	Lawrence Carter	RTD	6 (10)	Oct 20, 1990	Etess Arena, Atlantic City, New Jersey, U.S.	
31	Win	28–2 (1)	Mike Cohen	TKO	6 (10), 2:59	Jul 28, 1990	Trump's Castle, Atlantic City, New Jersey, U.S.	
30	NC	27–2 (1)	Orlin Norris	MD	12	Nov 21, 1989	Civic Auditorium, Santa Monica, California, U.S.	NABF heavyweight title at stake; Originally an MD win for Tubbs, later ruled an NC after he failed a drug test
29	Win	27–2	Ladislao Mijangos	TKO	3 (10)	Jun 24, 1989	Bakersfield, California, U.S.	
28	Win	26–2	Eddie Richardson	DQ	8 (10), 1:03	May 6, 1989	Civic Center, Pensacola, Florida, U.S.	Richardson disqualified for an intentional headbutt
27	Win	25–2	Mike Evans	UD	10	Apr 20, 1989	The Strand, Redondo Beach, California, U.S.	
26	Loss	24–2	Mike Tyson	TKO	2 (12), 2:54	Mar 21, 1988	Tokyo Dome, Tokyo, Japan	For WBA, WBC, and IBF heavyweight titles
25	Win	24–1	Eddie Gonzales	RTD	3 (10), 3:00	Sep 29, 1987	Celebrity Theatre, Anaheim, California, U.S.	
24	Win	23–1	Jerry Halstead	UD	10	May 30, 1987	Las Vegas Hilton, Winchester, Nevada, U.S.	
23	Win	22–1	Mike Jameson	UD	10	Apr 20, 1987	Civic Auditorium, Santa Monica, California, U.S.	
22	Loss	21–1	Tim Witherspoon	MD	15	Jan 17, 1986	Omni Coliseum, Atlanta, Georgia, U.S.	Lost WBA heavyweight title
21	Win	21–0	Greg Page	UD	15	Apr 29, 1985	Memorial Auditorium, Buffalo, New York, U.S.	Won WBA heavyweight title
20	Win	20–0	James Smith	UD	10	Mar 15, 1985	Riviera, Winchester, Nevada, U.S.	
19	Win	19–0	Tim Miller	TKO	2 (10)	Jan 16, 1985	Riviera, Winchester, Nevada, U.S.	
18	Win	18–0	Jerry Williams	TKO	7 (10), 2:39	Nov 9, 1984	Riviera, Winchester, Nevada, U.S.	
17	Win	17–0	Tom Trimm	TKO	2 (10)	Mar 18, 1984	Civic Auditorium, Santa Monica, California, U.S.	
16	Win	16–0	Gordon Racette	UD	10	Sep 9, 1983	Caesars Palace, Paradise, Nevada, U.S.	
15	Win	15–0	Jimmy Young	UD	10	Apr 10, 1983	Hilton, Pittsburgh, Pennsylvania, U.S.	
14	Win	14–0	Larry Givens	TKO	7 (10), 1:06	Feb 25, 1983	Cincinnati Gardens, Cincinnati, Ohio, U.S.	
13	Win	13–0	Steve Zouski	TKO	5 (10)	Sep 18, 1982	Sands, Atlantic City, New Jersey, U.S.	
12	Win	12–0	Clarence Hill	UD	10	Aug 7, 1982	University, Albuquerque, New Mexico, U.S.	
11	Win	11–0	Clayman Parker	TKO	1, 2:02	Jun 12, 1982	Playboy Hotel and Casino, Atlantic City, New Jersey, U.S.	
10	Win	10–0	Baker Tinsley	KO	3, 1:41	Apr 11, 1982	Playboy Hotel and Casino, Atlantic City, New Jersey, U.S.	
9	Win	9–0	Don Halpin	UD	8	Dec 18, 1981	David L. Lawrence Convention Center, Pittsburgh, Pennsylvania, U.S.	
8	Win	8–0	Jesse Brown	TKO	1, 2:24	Nov 21, 1981	Vegas Club, Erlanger, Kentucky, U.S.	
7	Win	7–0	Dennis Wimberly	TKO	2, 2:35	Aug 21, 1981	Thomas Dunn Sports Center, Elizabeth, New Jersey, U.S.	
6	Win	6–0	Mike Creel	RTD	3 (8), 3:00	Nov 29, 1980	Grand Olympic Auditorium, Los Angeles, California, U.S.	
5	Win	5–0	Larry Sims	TKO	3 (6)	Nov 22, 1980	Riverfront Coliseum, Cincinnati, Ohio, U.S.	
4	Win	4–0	John L Johnson	TKO	1 (6), 2:17	Nov 14, 1980	Jai-Alai Fronton, Miami, Florida, U.S.	
3	Win	3–0	Ron Draper	PTS	6	Nov 7, 1980	HemisFair Arena, San Antonio, Texas, U.S.	
2	Win	2–0	Ron Draper	TKO	4 (6), 0:54	Aug 2, 1980	Riverfront Coliseum, Cincinnati, Ohio, U.S.	
1	Win	1–0	Bruce Scott	TKO	1 (6), 1:13	Jun 14, 1980	Riverfront Coliseum, Cincinnati, Ohio, U.S.	

== Sources ==
- Toledo Blade February 3, 1980
- The Pittsburgh Press April 7, 1983
- Gettysburg Times April 30, 1985
- Philadelphia Inquirer January 18, 1986
- Daily News December 5, 1986
- Los Angeles Times March 22, 1988
- Sports Illustrated March 29, 1988
- The New York Times July 22, 1992
- Philadelphia Inquirer December 8, 1993

Sporting positions
Amateur boxing titles
Previous: Greg Page	U.S. heavyweight champion 1985, 1986	Next: Marvis Frazier
Regional boxing titles
Preceded by Brian Minto	West Virginia heavyweight champion December 30, 2004 – 2006; Retired	Vacant Title next held by Justin Howes
World boxing titles
Preceded by Greg Page	WBA heavyweight champion April 29, 1985 – January 17, 1986	Succeeded by Tim Witherspoon
