= James Smith (boxer) =

American boxer (born 1953)

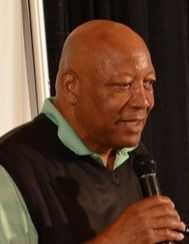
- Smith in 2018

Personal information
- Nickname: Bonecrusher
- Born: April 3, 1953 (age 73) Magnolia, North Carolina, U.S.
- Height: 6 ft 4 in (193 cm)
- Weight: Heavyweight

Boxing career
- Reach: 82 in (208 cm)
- Stance: Orthodox

Boxing record
- Total fights: 62
- Wins: 44
- Win by KO: 32
- Losses: 17
- Draws: 1

James "Bonecrusher" Smith (born April 3, 1953) is an American former professional boxer who competed from 1981 to 1999 and held the WBA heavyweight world title from 1986 to 1987.

== Early life ==
Smith was born in Magnolia, North Carolina. After graduating from high school, he attended James Sprunt Community College in Kenansville, North Carolina. He earned an associate's degree in business administration in 1973. Two years later, he got a bachelor's degree in business administration from Shaw University in Raleigh.

== Amateur career ==
After serving in the U.S. military and working as a prison guard, Smith competed as an amateur boxer, compiling a record of 35–4 before turning professional in November 1981.

== Professional career ==
He lost his first fight against James "Broad-Axe" Broad, a world-class amateur and qualifier for the 1980 Olympics who was 2–0 as a pro. The fight was broadcast on ESPN. Smith was dropped in 4 rounds with body shots and counted out.

The following year Smith upset future cruiserweight world champion and southpaw Ricky Parkey, then 2–0 as a pro, by winning a 6-round points decision. After scoring two knockouts, Smith followed up the Parkey win with another upset: an 8-round points decision over Chris McDonald, who was 8–0–1 as a pro and had been a top amateur. He went on to score nine straight knockouts, before traveling to the UK in 1984, where he fought and knocked out Frank Bruno, who was 21–0 (21 KOs).

In November 1984, he fought Larry Holmes for the IBF heavyweight championship. Holmes had a record of 45–0 (32 KOs) and had won eighteen straight world title fights. Smith was stopped on advice of the doctor in the 12th round, due to a severe cut, and was behind on points again. He had Holmes in trouble from rounds five to seven.

Smith came back in 1985, fighting on Don King undercards. He lost a 10-round decision to 19–0 amateur star and future world champ Tony Tubbs in an eliminator, won a 10-round decision over 18–1 Cuban contender José Ribalta, then dropped a wide 12-round decision to ex-world champ Tim Witherspoon in a bid for Witherspoon's NABF belt.

In 1986 he dropped Marvis Frazier, including breaking Frazier's jaw, but lost the 10-round decision. At this time, Bonecrusher began consulting a psychiatrist. In his next fight he beat ex-world champ Mike Weaver in one round. He followed it up with two 10-round decisions over Jesse Ferguson (14–2) and David Bey (15–2).

=== WBA Heavyweight Champion ===
In December 1986, while preparing for a fight with Mitch "Blood" Green, Don King informed him at short notice that Tony Tubbs had dropped out of his upcoming challenge to WBA champ Tim Witherspoon, and now Smith would be getting a rematch with Witherspoon. He dropped Witherspoon three times in the opening round, scoring a first-round knockout and winning the WBA world title in an upset.

With his victory over Witherspoon, Smith took his place in the heavyweight unification series, an ongoing competition being conducted by HBO and King to crown an undisputed world heavyweight champion for the first time since the retirement of Muhammad Ali. The victory garnered Smith another fight, where he was to defend his belt against newly crowned WBC champion Mike Tyson in a unification contest. Taking place on March 7, 1987, the bout saw Tyson beat Smith to the punch in nearly every round, while Smith resorted to holding to keep himself in the fight. The decision saw Smith lose eleven rounds on two scorecards and all twelve on another.

=== Final years ===
Smith returned to the ring for a few months, taking on Brazilian contender Adilson "Maguila" Rodrigues in São Paulo and losing by split decision.

In 1989, now aged 36, he took on the Jamaican-Canadian Razor Ruddock. Ruddock won by knockout in the 7th round and Smith announced his retirement afterwards, declaring he would pursue politics.

Smith was back in the ring only two months later, knocking out journeyman Calvin Jones, followed by three more knockouts before being matched with former victim Mike Weaver in a battle of hard hitting ex-champs. This time, Smith was resigned to having to win a dull 12-round points decision over Weaver, although he did score a knockdown in a brief moment of excitement. He also earned the WBA Americas belt and a world ranking.

After a year-long layoff he was back, now aged 38, and scored six knockouts. Achievements included a notable 8-round knockout of the cement-skulled journeyman Everett "Bigfoot" Martin (who had just taken George Foreman the distance) and a first-round knockout of Jeff Sims.

Smith lost his world ranking and all his momentum in November 1991 when he dropped a shocking 10-round decision to club fighter Levi Billups who had a patchy 15–5 record. Smith looked under-prepared as he was banged around and generally outhustled by Billups. Smith rallied to knock down the underdog in the 9th; however, it was too little too late.

Still active in 1992, now aged 39 and with a 33–9–1 record, Smith regained some credibility with a 10-round decision over Mark Wills. His old agitator Don King gave him another opportunity on one of his undercards and matched him with warhorse Greg Page, in a battle of two ex-champs. In the opening round, Bonecrusher tried to rush Page as he had done Witherspoon; however, Smith was decked for his efforts and outpunched by Page over the 10 round distance.

In 1993 Smith lost to undefeated southpaw and #1 contender Michael Moorer. The paying audience jeered the two passive fighters through to the 10 round finish, where Smith lost a lopsided decision.

Smith competed in the One-Night Heavyweight Tournament in Bay St Louis (not included in the official record, counted as show), where a group of heavies of varying quality would fight a series of 3 round fights with the winner being awarded one million dollars. He beat Lester Jackson and Marshall Tillman, before losing in the semi-final to Romanian prospect Daniel Dăncuţă. Smith's old buddy Tony Tubbs eventually won the tournament.

In 1994 Smith was matched with power punching Lionel Butler, who was highly ranked and on a red-hot string of knockouts. Smith collapsed in 3 rounds with little resistance.

Later that year he traveled to Europe to drop a points decision to German Axel Schulz, and in Denmark he was stopped in 5 rounds due to a cut from a headbutt by Brian Nielsen. Smith was overweight for both fights and his days as a contender dwindled.

He fought on and off for a few more years. In 1998, he traveled to Australia to battle Joe Bugner for the WBF heavyweight championship, but had to retire after one round when his shoulder dislocated. The same injury ended a fight in 1999 with former world champion Larry Holmes. After this loss, Smith retired at the age of 46, touting a record of 44–17–1 (32 KOs).

In 1995, Smith helped establish the North Carolina Boxing Commission and served as the first chairman.

== Life after boxing ==
Smith became an ordained minister in 1996 and dedicated his life to helping young people stay clear of crime and drugs. Three years later, he retired from boxing.

In 2004 Smith started the non-profit Champion For Kids Inc. to provide scholarships to high school students.

Smith began working as a recruiter and the Director of Intramural Athletics for Sandhills Community College in June 2005.

Deeply committed to helping impoverished fighters, Smith was a guest at the Ring 10 Veterans Boxing Foundation 2nd Annual Fundraiser in 2012, where he expressed his support of initiatives to better provide for those in need.

Smith is currently working with organizers to establish the Legends of Boxing Hall of Fame in Myrtle Beach, South Carolina.

== Professional boxing record ==
62 fights	44 wins	17 losses
By knockout	32	7
By decision	12	10
Draws	1	

No.	Result	Record	Opponent	Type	Round, time	Date	Location	Notes
62	Loss	44–17–1	Larry Holmes	TKO	8 (10), 2:00	Jun 18, 1999	Crown Coliseum, Fayetteville, North Carolina, U.S.	
61	Win	44–16–1	Dave Slaughter	TKO	2 (8), 1:50	Nov 27, 1998	Genesis Convention Center, Gary, Indiana, U.S.	
60	Loss	43–16–1	Joe Bugner	RTD	1 (12), 3:00	Jul 4, 1998	Carrara Indoor Stadium, Gold Coast, Australia	For vacant WBF (Federation) heavyweight title
59	Win	43–15–1	Lynwood Jones	UD	8	Feb 25, 1998	The Ritz, Raleigh, North Carolina, U.S.	
58	Win	42–15–1	Troy Roberts	TKO	3 (10), 2:36	Apr 11, 1996	University, Vancouver, British Columbia, Canada	
57	Win	41–15–1	Eli Dixon	TKO	3 (8)	Aug 22, 1995	Civic Center, Raleigh, North Carolina, U.S.	
56	Win	40–15–1	Bernd Friedrich	SD	10	Mar 25, 1995	Düsseldorf, Germany	
55	Loss	39–15–1	Brian Nielsen	TKO	5 (8)	Oct 7, 1994	K.B. Hallen, Copenhagen, Denmark	
54	Loss	39–14–1	Axel Schulz	UD	10	Sep 17, 1994	Leverkusen, Germany	
53	Loss	39–13–1	Lionel Butler	TKO	3 (10), 2:19	Jan 18, 1994	Civic Auditorium, Omaha, Nebraska, U.S.	
52	Win	39–12–1	Lester Jackson	UD	3	Dec 3, 1993	Casino Magic, Bay St. Louis, Mississippi, U.S.	
51	Win	38–12–1	Marshall Tillman	UD	3	Dec 3, 1993	Casino Magic, Bay St. Louis, Mississippi, U.S.	
50	Loss	37–12–1	Daniel Dăncuță	UD	3	Dec 3, 1993	Casino Magic, Bay St. Louis, Mississippi, U.S.	
49	Win	37–11–1	Elijah Tillery	TKO	6 (10), 2:51	Sep 14, 1993	Steel Pier, Atlantic City, New Jersey, U.S.	
48	Win	36–11–1	Andrew Stokes	UD	10	Aug 7, 1993	Steel Pier, Atlantic City, New Jersey, U.S.	
47	Win	35–11–1	Kevin Ford	TKO	9 (10)	Jun 26, 1993	Steel Pier, Atlantic City, New Jersey, U.S.	
46	Win	34–11–1	Donnell Wingfield	TKO	2 (10), 1:53	Jun 1, 1993	The Blue Horizon, Philadelphia, Pennsylvania, U.S.	
45	Loss	33–11–1	Michael Moorer	UD	10	Feb 27, 1993	Showboat, Atlantic City, New Jersey, U.S.	
44	Loss	33–10–1	Greg Page	UD	10	Jun 26, 1992	CSU Convocation Center, Cleveland, Ohio, U.S.	
43	Win	33–9–1	Danny Wofford	TKO	8	Apr 24, 1992	Raleigh, North Carolina, U.S.	
42	Win	32–9–1	Mark Wills	UD	10	Feb 15, 1992	The Mirage, Paradise, Nevada, U.S.	
41	Win	31–9–1	Andre Crowder	KO	1 (10), 1:50	Dec 13, 1991	Union Hall, Countryside, Illinois, U.S.	
40	Loss	30–9–1	Levi Billups	UD	10	Nov 4, 1991	Great Western Forum, Inglewood, California, U.S.	
39	Win	30–8–1	Marshall Tillman	TKO	10 (10), 2:14	Sep 24, 1991	Metairie, Louisiana, U.S.	
38	Win	29–8–1	Jeff Sims	KO	1 (10), 1:41	Sep 17, 1991	The Palace, Auburn Hills, Michigan, U.S.	
37	Win	28–8–1	Everett Martin	TKO	8 (10), 0:50	Aug 6, 1991	Civic Auditorium, San Francisco, California, U.S.	
36	Win	27–8–1	Kimmuel Odum	TKO	3 (12), 2:37	Jul 22, 1991	Great Western Forum, Inglewood, California, U.S.	Won vacant IBC Junior heavyweight title
35	Win	26–8–1	Terry Armstrong	KO	2	Jun 28, 1991	Salle Leyrit, Nice, France	
34	Win	25–8–1	Lawrence Carter	TKO	1 (12), 2:28	Apr 28, 1991	Civic Center, Raleigh, North Carolina, U.S.	
33	Win	24–8–1	Mike Weaver	UD	12	Apr 4, 1990	Madison Square Garden, New York City, New York, U.S.	Won WBA Americas heavyweight title
32	Win	23–8–1	Manoel de Almeida	RTD	6 (10), 3:00	Feb 20, 1990	Trump Plaza Hotel and Casino, Atlantic City, New Jersey, U.S.	
31	Win	22–8–1	Mike Rouse	KO	7 (10), 1:42	Dec 14, 1989	St. Joseph, Missouri, U.S.	
30	Win	21–8–1	Jesse McGhee	TKO	2	Oct 21, 1989	Grady Cole Center, Charlotte, North Carolina, U.S.	
29	Win	20–8–1	Calvin Jones	TKO	8 (10)	Sep 29, 1989	Athletic Park, Durham, North Carolina, U.S.	
28	Loss	19–8–1	Donovan Ruddock	KO	7 (10), 2:18	Jul 2, 1989	Cumberland County Memorial Arena, Fayetteville, North Carolina, U.S.	
27	Draw	19–7–1	Mike Rouse	TD	3 (10)	Jul 30, 1988	Broadway by the Bay Theater, Atlantic City, New Jersey, U.S.	Rouse cut from an accidental head clash
26	Loss	19–7	Adílson Rodrigues	SD	10	Aug 9, 1987	Ginásio Estadual do Ibirapuera, São Paulo, Brazil	
25	Loss	19–6	Mike Tyson	UD	12	Mar 7, 1987	Las Vegas Hilton, Winchester, Nevada, U.S.	Lost WBA heavyweight title; For WBC heavyweight title
24	Win	19–5	Tim Witherspoon	TKO	1 (15), 2:12	Dec 12, 1986	Madison Square Garden, New York City, New York, U.S.	Won WBA heavyweight title
23	Win	18–5	David Bey	UD	10	Aug 23, 1986	Cumberland County Auditorium, Fayetteville, North Carolina, U.S.	
22	Win	17–5	Jesse Ferguson	MD	10	Jun 7, 1986	Hamilton, Bermuda	
21	Win	16–5	Mike Weaver	TKO	1 (10), 2:29	Apr 5, 1986	Coliseum Theatre, Colonie, New York, U.S.	
20	Loss	15–5	Marvis Frazier	UD	10	Feb 23, 1986	Memorial Auditorium, Richmond, California, U.S.	
19	Loss	15–4	Tim Witherspoon	UD	12	Jun 15, 1985	Riviera, Winchester, Nevada, U.S.	For NABF heavyweight title
18	Win	15–3	José Ribalta	SD	10	Apr 29, 1985	Memorial Auditorium, Buffalo, New York, U.S.	
17	Loss	14–3	Tony Tubbs	UD	10	Mar 15, 1985	Riviera, Winchester, Nevada, U.S.	
16	Loss	14–2	Larry Holmes	TKO	12 (15), 2:10	Nov 9, 1984	Riviera, Winchester, Nevada, U.S.	For IBF heavyweight title
15	Win	14–1	Frank Bruno	KO	10 (10)	May 13, 1984	Wembley Arena, London, England	
14	Win	13–1	Rahim Muhammad	TKO	5	Feb 19, 1984	Hyatt Regency, Tampa, Florida, U.S.	
13	Win	12–1	Leroy Boone	TKO	4 (10)	Nov 4, 1983	Egypt Shrine Temple, Tampa, Florida, U.S.	
12	Win	11–1	Walter Santemore	TKO	4 (10)	Aug 23, 1983	Tropicana, Atlantic City, New Jersey, U.S.	
11	Win	10–1	Eugene Cato	KO	4 (10)	Jun 14, 1983	Ramada Hotel, Charleston, South Carolina, U.S.	
10	Win	9–1	Lynwood Jones	TKO	2	May 10, 1983	Tropicana, Atlantic City, New Jersey, U.S.	
9	Win	8–1	Lee Cohen	KO	1	Apr 23, 1983	New York City, New York, U.S.	
8	Win	7–1	Nate Robinson	TKO	2 (8), 1:35	Apr 2, 1983	Host Resort, Lancaster, Pennsylvania, U.S.	
7	Win	6–1	Larry Givens	TKO	3	Dec 14, 1982	Atlantic City, New Jersey, U.S.	
6	Win	5–1	Lonnie Chapman	KO	2	Oct 16, 1982	Coliseum, Charlotte, North Carolina, U.S.	
5	Win	4–1	Chris McDonald	MD	8	Sep 11, 1982	Sands, Atlantic City, New Jersey, U.S.	
4	Win	3–1	Louis Alexander	KO	2, 2:37	Jul 31, 1982	Bally's Park Place, Atlantic City, New Jersey, U.S.	
3	Win	2–1	Mike Cohen	KO	2	Apr 22, 1982	Sheraton Hotel, Charleston, South Carolina, U.S.	
2	Win	1–1	Ricky Parkey	PTS	6	Jan 30, 1982	Knoxville, Tennessee, U.S.	
1	Loss	0–1	James Broad	KO	4 (6), 1:07	Nov 5, 1981	Sands, Atlantic City, New Jersey, U.S.	

Sporting positions
World boxing titles
Preceded by Tim Witherspoon	WBA heavyweight champion December 12, 1986 – March 7, 1987	Succeeded by Mike Tyson
