= Mike Tyson =

American boxer and media personality (born 1966)

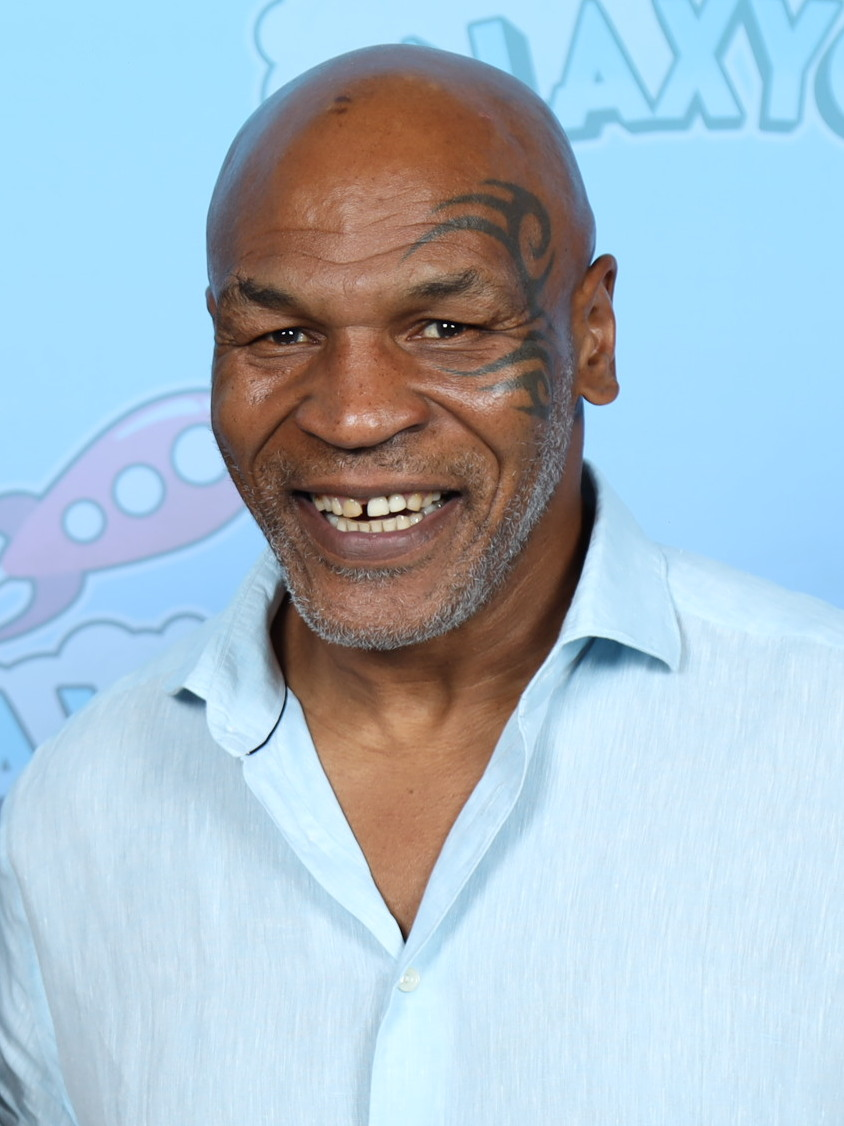
- Tyson in 2023

Personal information
- Nicknames: Iron Mike; Kid Dynamite; The Baddest Man on the Planet
- Born: Michael Gerard Tyson; June 30, 1966 (age 60) Brooklyn, New York City, U.S.
- Height: 5 ft 10 in (178 cm) (Note: Sources vary on his height, with some listing him as 5 ft 11 1/2 in (182 cm).)
- Weight: Heavyweight
- Spouses: Robin Givens (m. 1988; div. 1989); Monica Turner (m. 1997; div. 2003); Lakiha Spicer (m. 2009)
- Children: 7
- Website: miketyson.com

Boxing career
- Reach: 71 in (180 cm)
- Stance: Orthodox

Boxing record
- Total fights: 59
- Wins: 50
- Win by KO: 44
- Losses: 7
- No contests: 2
Medal record
Men's amateur boxing
National Junior Olympics
Gold medal – first place	1981 North Carolina	Heavyweight
Gold medal – first place	1982 Tennessee	Heavyweight
Golden Gloves
Gold medal – first place	1984 New York	Heavyweight
Silver medal – second place	1983 Albuquerque	Super Heavyweight

Michael Gerard Tyson (born June 30, 1966) is an American former professional boxer who competed between 1985 and 2024. Nicknamed "Iron Mike" and "Kid Dynamite" in his early career, and later known as "the Baddest Man on the Planet", Tyson is widely regarded as one of the greatest heavyweight boxers of all time, and one of the most intimidating men in boxing history. He reigned as the undisputed world heavyweight champion from 1987 to 1990.

Tyson won his first 19 professional fights by knockout, 12 of them in the first round. Claiming his first belt at the age of 20, Tyson holds the record as the youngest boxer ever to win a heavyweight title. He was the first heavyweight boxer to simultaneously hold the World Boxing Association (WBA), World Boxing Council (WBC), and International Boxing Federation (IBF) titles, as well as the only heavyweight to unify them in succession. The following year, Tyson became the lineal champion when he knocked out Michael Spinks in 91 seconds into the first round. In 1990, Tyson lost the undisputed heavyweight championship when he was knocked out by underdog Buster Douglas, making it one of the biggest upsets in boxing history.

In 1992, he was convicted of rape and sentenced to six years in prison. He was released on parole after three years. After his release in 1995, he engaged in a series of comeback fights, regaining the WBA and WBC titles in 1996 to join Floyd Patterson, Muhammad Ali, Tim Witherspoon, Evander Holyfield and George Foreman as the only men in boxing history to have regained a heavyweight championship after losing it. After being stripped of the WBC title in the same year, Tyson lost the WBA title to Evander Holyfield by an eleventh round stoppage. Their 1997 rematch ended when Tyson was disqualified for biting Holyfield's ears. In 2002, Tyson fought for the world heavyweight title, losing by knockout to Lennox Lewis. In November 2024, his bout against Jake Paul, which he lost via unanimous decision, became the biggest boxing gate in US history outside of Las Vegas.

Tyson was known for his ferocious and intimidating boxing style as well as his controversial behavior inside and outside the ring, which he explained was inspired by Sonny Liston, known for his strength and intimidation. With a knockout-to-win percentage of 88%, he was ranked 16th on The Ring magazine's list of 100 greatest punchers of all time, and first on ESPN's list of "The Hardest Hitters in Heavyweight History". Sky Sports described him as "perhaps the most ferocious fighter to step into a professional ring". He has been inducted into the International Boxing Hall of Fame and the World Boxing Hall of Fame.

Outside his boxing career, Tyson has appeared in various popular media. He appeared in the well-received movies Rocky Balboa (2006) and The Hangover (2009).

== Early life ==
Michael Gerard Tyson was born on June 30, 1966, at Cumberland Hospital in Fort Greene, Brooklyn, New York City. He has an older brother named Rodney (born c. 1961) and had an older sister named Denise, who died of a heart attack at age 24 in February 1990. Tyson's mother, born in Charlottesville, Virginia, was described as a promiscuous woman who might have been a prostitute. Tyson's biological father is listed as "Purcell Tyson", a "humble cab driver" (who was from Jamaica) on his birth certificate, but the man Tyson had known as his father was a pimp named Jimmy Kirkpatrick. Kirkpatrick was from Grier Town, North Carolina (a predominantly black neighborhood that was annexed by the city of Charlotte), where he was one of the neighborhood's top baseball players. Kirkpatrick married and had a son, Tyson's half-brother Jimmie Lee Kirkpatrick, who would help to integrate Charlotte high school football in 1965. In 1959, Jimmie Kirkpatrick left his family and moved to Brooklyn, where he met Tyson's mother, Lorna Mae (Smith) Tyson. Kirkpatrick frequented pool halls, gambled and hung out on the streets. "My father was just a regular street guy caught up in the street world," Tyson said. Kirkpatrick abandoned the Tyson family around the time Mike was born, leaving Tyson's mother to care for the children on her own. Kirkpatrick died in 1992.

The family lived in Bedford-Stuyvesant until their financial burdens necessitated a move to Brownsville when Tyson was 10 years old. Throughout his childhood, Tyson lived in and around neighborhoods with a high rate of crime. According to an interview in Details, his first fight was with a bigger youth who had pulled the head off one of Tyson's pigeons. He was repeatedly caught committing petty crimes and fighting those who ridiculed his high-pitched voice and lisp. By the age of 13, he had been arrested 38 times. Tyson later stated that he had been in around 150 street fights during his youth. He ended up at the Tryon School for Boys in Johnstown, New York. Tyson's emerging boxing ability was discovered there by Bobby Stewart, a juvenile detention center counselor and former boxer. Stewart noted that Tyson could bench press more than his weight, and through Stewart, Tyson met boxing manager and trainer Cus D'Amato. Tyson dropped out of high school as a junior. He was later awarded an honorary Doctorate in Humane Letters from Central State University in 1989. Kevin Rooney also trained Tyson, and he was occasionally assisted by Teddy Atlas, although Atlas was dismissed by D'Amato when Tyson was 15. Rooney eventually took over all training duties for the young fighter.

Tyson's mother died when he was 16, leaving him in the care of D'Amato, who would become his legal guardian. Tyson later said, "I never saw my mother happy with me and proud of me for doing something: she only knew me as being a wild kid running the streets, coming home with new clothes that she knew I didn't pay for. I never got a chance to talk to her or know about her. Professionally, it has no effect, but it's crushing emotionally and personally."

== Amateur career ==
As an amateur, Tyson won gold medals at the 1981 and 1982 Junior Olympic Games, defeating Joe Cortez in 1981 and beating Kelton Brown in 1982. Brown's corner threw in the towel in the first round. In 1984 Tyson won the gold medal at the Nation Golden Gloves held in New York, beating Jonathan Littles. He fought Henry Tillman twice as an amateur, losing both bouts by decision. Tillman went on to win heavyweight gold at the 1984 Summer Olympics in Los Angeles. He complied an amateur record of 24 wins and 3 losses.

== Professional career ==
=== Early career ===
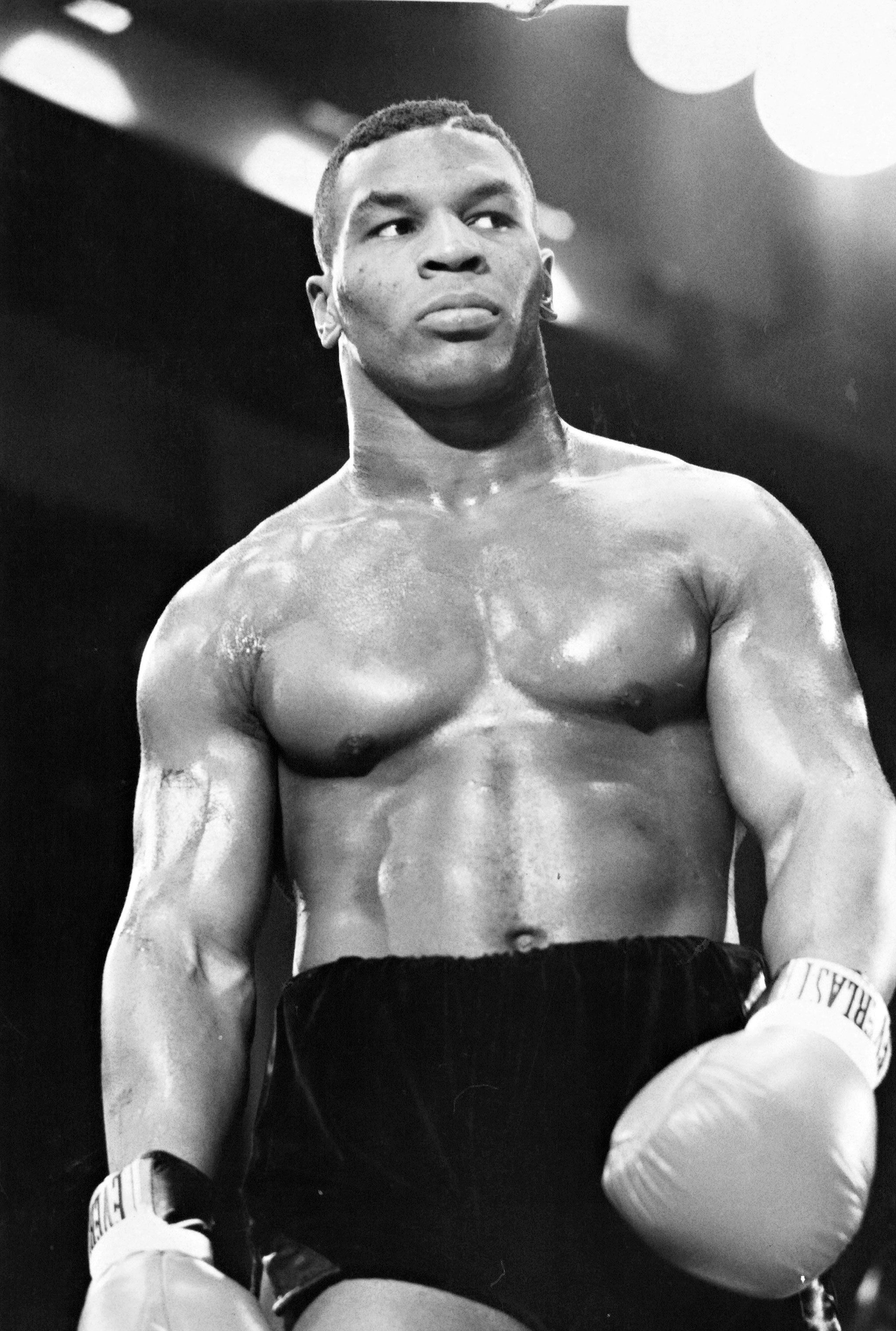
Tyson in 1985

Tyson made his professional debut as an 18-year-old on March 6, 1985, in Albany, New York. He defeated Hector Mercedes via first-round TKO. He had 15 bouts in his first year as a professional. Fighting frequently, Tyson won 26 of his first 28 fights by KO or TKO; 16 of those came in the first round. The quality of his opponents gradually increased to journeyman fighters and borderline contenders, like James Tillis, David Jaco, Jesse Ferguson, Mitch Green, and Marvis Frazier. His win streak attracted media attention and Tyson was billed as the next great heavyweight champion. D'Amato died in November 1985, relatively early into Tyson's professional career, and some speculate that his death was the catalyst to many of the troubles Tyson was to experience as his life and career progressed.

=== Rise up the ranks ===
Tyson's first nationally televised bout took place on February 16, 1986, at Houston Field House in Troy, New York, against journeyman heavyweight Jesse Ferguson, and was carried by ABC Sports. Tyson knocked down Ferguson with an uppercut in the fifth round that broke Ferguson's nose. During the sixth round, Ferguson began to hold and clinch Tyson in an apparent attempt to avoid further punishment. After admonishing Ferguson several times to obey his commands to box, the referee finally stopped the fight near the middle of the sixth round. The fight was initially ruled a win for Tyson by disqualification (DQ) of his opponent. The ruling was "adjusted" to a win by technical knockout (TKO) after Tyson's corner protested that a DQ win would end Tyson's string of knockout victories, and that a knockout would have been the inevitable result.

In July, after recording six more knockout victories, Tyson fought former world title challenger Marvis Frazier in Glens Falls, New York, on another ABC Sports broadcast. Tyson won easily, charging at Frazier at the opening bell and hitting him with two consecutive uppercuts, the second of which knocked Frazier unconscious thirty seconds into the fight.

After his win over Frazier, Tyson was booked to fight José Ribalta at the Trump Plaza Hotel and Casino in Atlantic City, New Jersey in 1986. Ribalta hit Tyson in the body throughout the fight. Tyson knocked down Ribalta three times, in the 2nd, 8th, and 10th round, and then the referee called the fight off. Tyson said Ribalta was his toughest fight: "I hit Jose Ribalta with everything, and he took everything and kept coming back for more. Jose Ribalta stood toe to toe with me. He was very strong in the clinches," and "Ribalta was a game fighter who actually engaged me. I felt nauseous from all Ribalta's body blows, even hours after the fight. I never felt that much general pain again."

=== WBC heavyweight champion ===
==== Tyson vs. Berbick ====
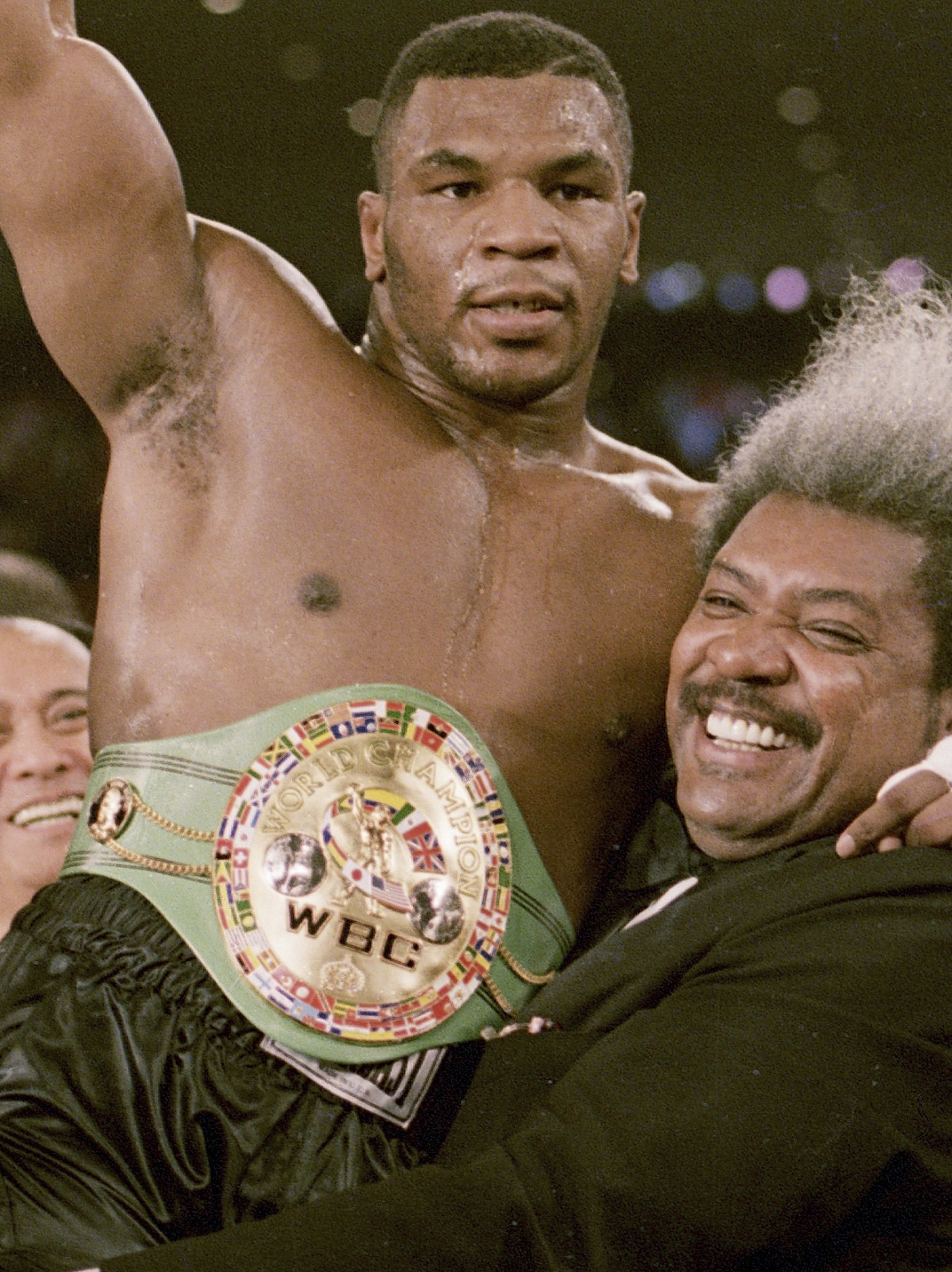
Tyson with the WBC championship belt and Don King after the match

On November 22, 1986, Tyson was given his first title fight against Trevor Berbick for the World Boxing Council (WBC) heavyweight championship. Tyson won the title by TKO in the second round, and at the age of 20 years and 4 months became the youngest heavyweight champion in history. He added the WBA and IBF titles after defeating James Smith and Tony Tucker in 1987. Tyson's dominant performances brought many accolades. Donald Saunders wrote: "The noble and manly art of boxing can at least cease worrying about its immediate future, now [that] it has discovered a heavyweight champion fit to stand alongside Dempsey, Tunney, Louis, Marciano, and Ali."

Tyson intimidated fighters with his strength, combined with outstanding hand speed, accuracy, coordination and timing. Tyson also possessed notable defensive abilities, holding his hands high in the peek-a-boo style taught by his mentor Cus D'Amato to slip under and weave around his opponent's punches while timing his own counters and exerting constant pressure. Tyson's explosive punching technique was due in large part to crouching immediately prior to throwing a hook or an uppercut: this allowed the "spring" of his legs to add power to the punch. Among his signature moves was a right hook to his opponent's body followed by a right uppercut to his opponent's chin. Lorenzo Boyd, Jesse Ferguson and José Ribalta were each knocked down by this combination.

=== Unified heavyweight champion ===
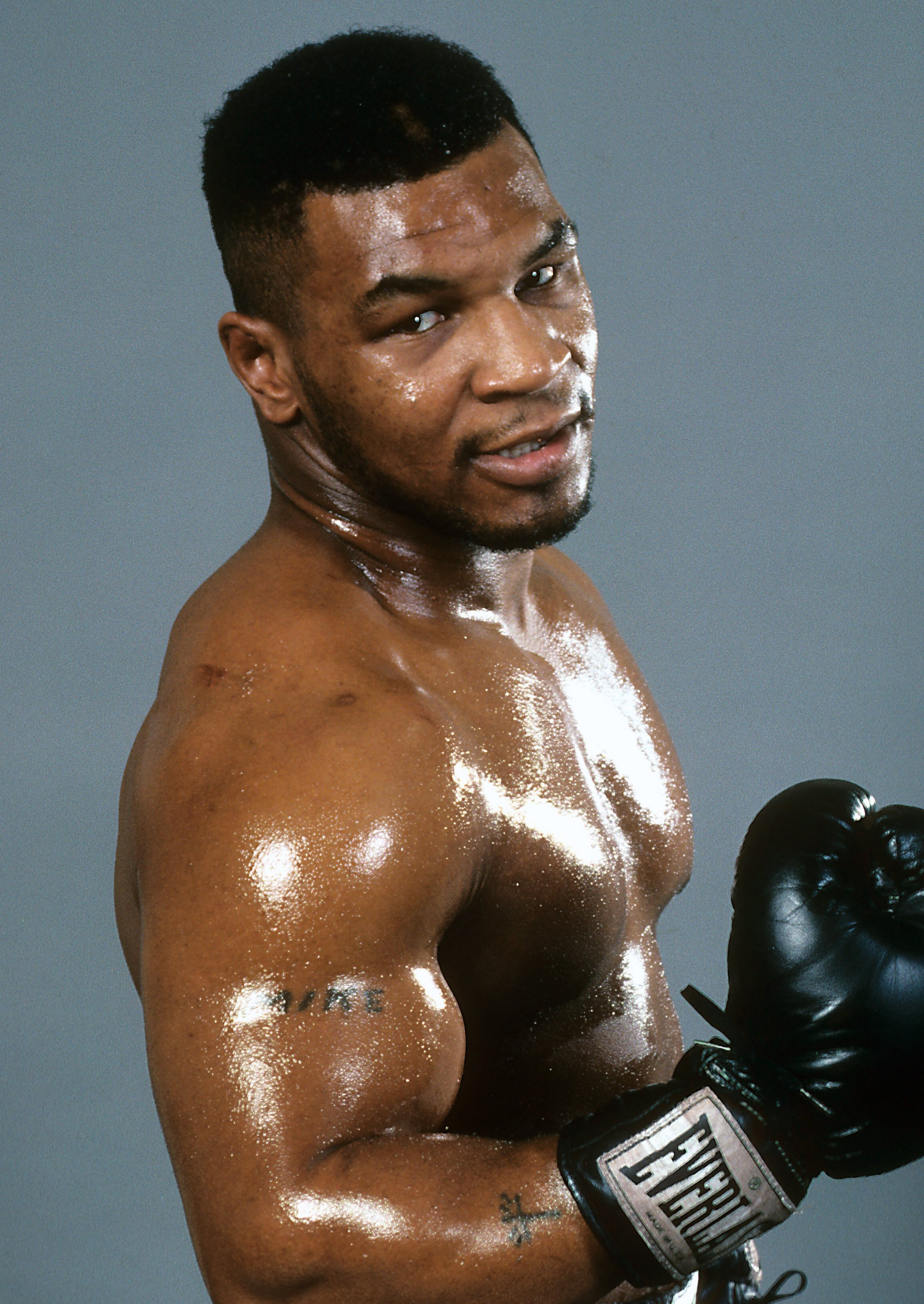
Tyson in 1987

==== Tyson vs. Smith, Thomas ====
Expectations for Tyson were extremely high, and he was the favorite to win the heavyweight unification series, a tournament designed to establish an undisputed heavyweight champion. Tyson defended his title against James Smith on March 7, 1987, in Las Vegas, Nevada. He won by unanimous decision and added Smith's World Boxing Association (WBA) title to his existing belt. "Tyson-mania" in the media was becoming rampant.

He beat Pinklon Thomas in May by TKO in the sixth round.

=== Undisputed heavyweight champion ===
==== Tyson vs. Tucker ====
On August 1 he took the International Boxing Federation (IBF) title from Tony Tucker in a twelve-round unanimous decision 119–111, 118–113, and 116–112. He became the first heavyweight to own all three major belts – WBA, WBC, and IBF – at the same time.

==== Tyson vs. Biggs, Holmes, Tubbs ====
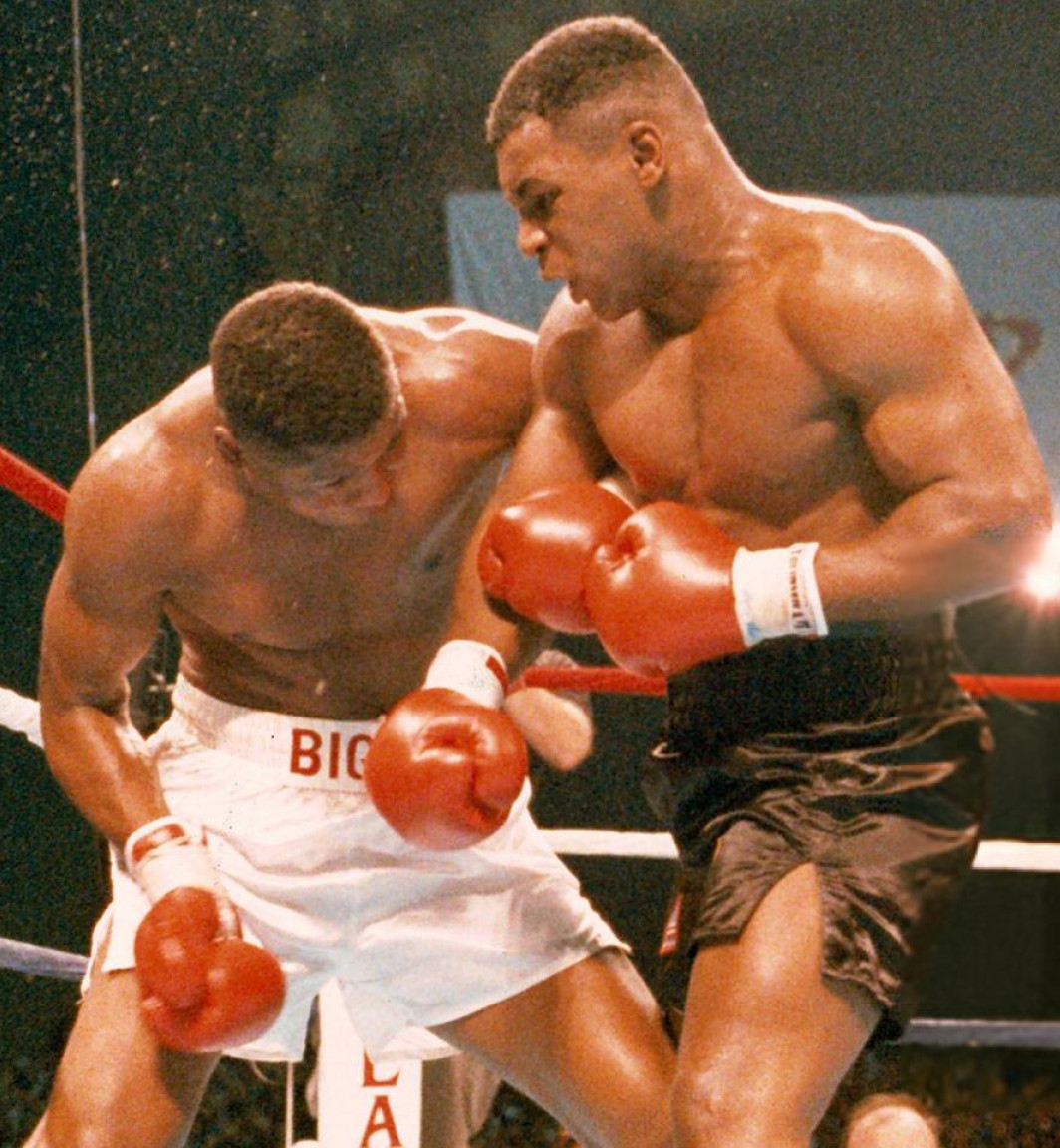
Tyson vs. Biggs in October 1987

Another fight, in October of that year, ended with a victory for Tyson over 1984 Olympic super heavyweight gold medalist Tyrell Biggs by TKO in the seventh round.

During this time, Tyson came to the attention of gaming company Nintendo. After witnessing one of Tyson's fights, Nintendo of America president Minoru Arakawa was impressed by the fighter's "power and skill", prompting him to suggest Tyson be included in the upcoming Nintendo Entertainment System port of the Punch-Out!! arcade game. In 1987, Nintendo released Mike Tyson's Punch-Out!!, which was well received and sold more than a million copies. It has retrospectively been considered one of the greatest games of all-time.

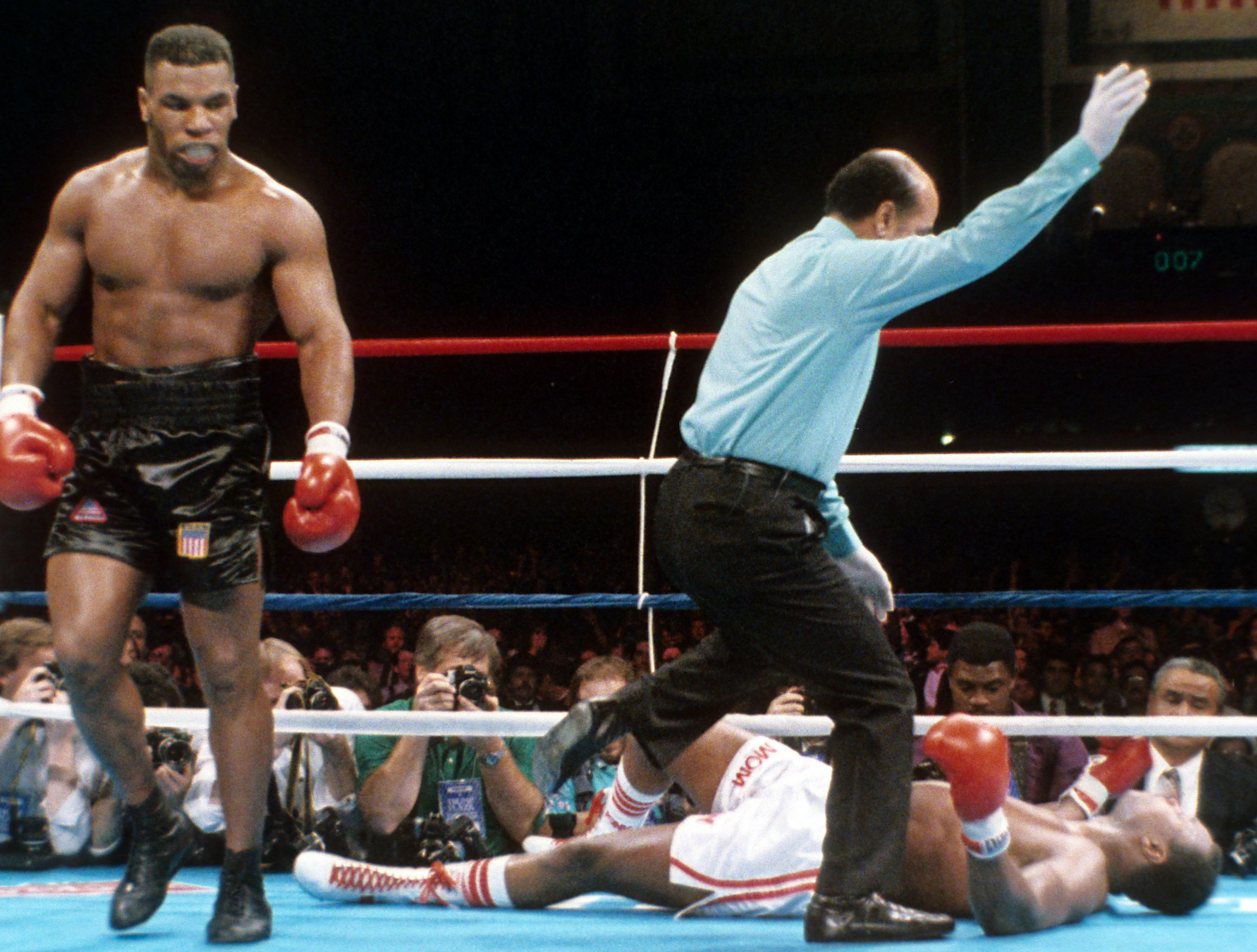
Tyson vs. Holmes in 1988

Tyson had three fights in 1988. He faced Larry Holmes on January 22, 1988, and defeated the legendary former champion by TKO in the fourth round. This was the only knockout loss Holmes had in 75 professional bouts.

In March, Tyson then fought contender Tony Tubbs in Tokyo, Japan, fitting in an easy second-round TKO victory amid promotional and marketing work.

==== Tyson vs. Spinks ====
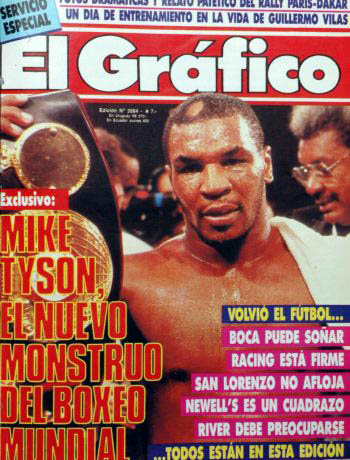
Tyson on the cover of a 1988 issue of El Gráfico

On June 27, 1988, Tyson faced Michael Spinks. Spinks, who had taken the heavyweight championship from Larry Holmes via fifteen-round decision in 1985, had not lost his title in the ring but was not recognized as champion by the major boxing organizations. Holmes had previously given up all but the IBF title, and that was eventually stripped from Spinks after he elected to fight Gerry Cooney (winning by TKO in the fifth round) rather than IBF Number 1 Contender Tony Tucker, as the Cooney fight provided him a larger purse. However, Spinks did become the lineal champion by beating Holmes and many (including Ring magazine) considered him to have a legitimate claim to being the true heavyweight champion. The bout was, at the time, the richest fight in history and expectations were very high. Boxing pundits were predicting a titanic battle of styles, with Tyson's aggressive infighting conflicting with Spinks's skillful out-boxing and footwork. The fight ended after 91 seconds when Tyson knocked Spinks out in the first round; many consider this to be the pinnacle of Tyson's fame and boxing ability.

During this period, Tyson's problems outside the ring were also beginning to emerge. His marriage to Robin Givens was heading for divorce, and his future contract was being fought over by Don King and Bill Cayton. In late 1988, Tyson parted with manager Bill Cayton and fired longtime trainer Kevin Rooney, the man many credit for honing Tyson's craft after the death of D'Amato. Following Rooney's departure, critics alleged that Tyson began to show less head movement and combination punching.

==== Tyson vs. Bruno, Carl Williams ====
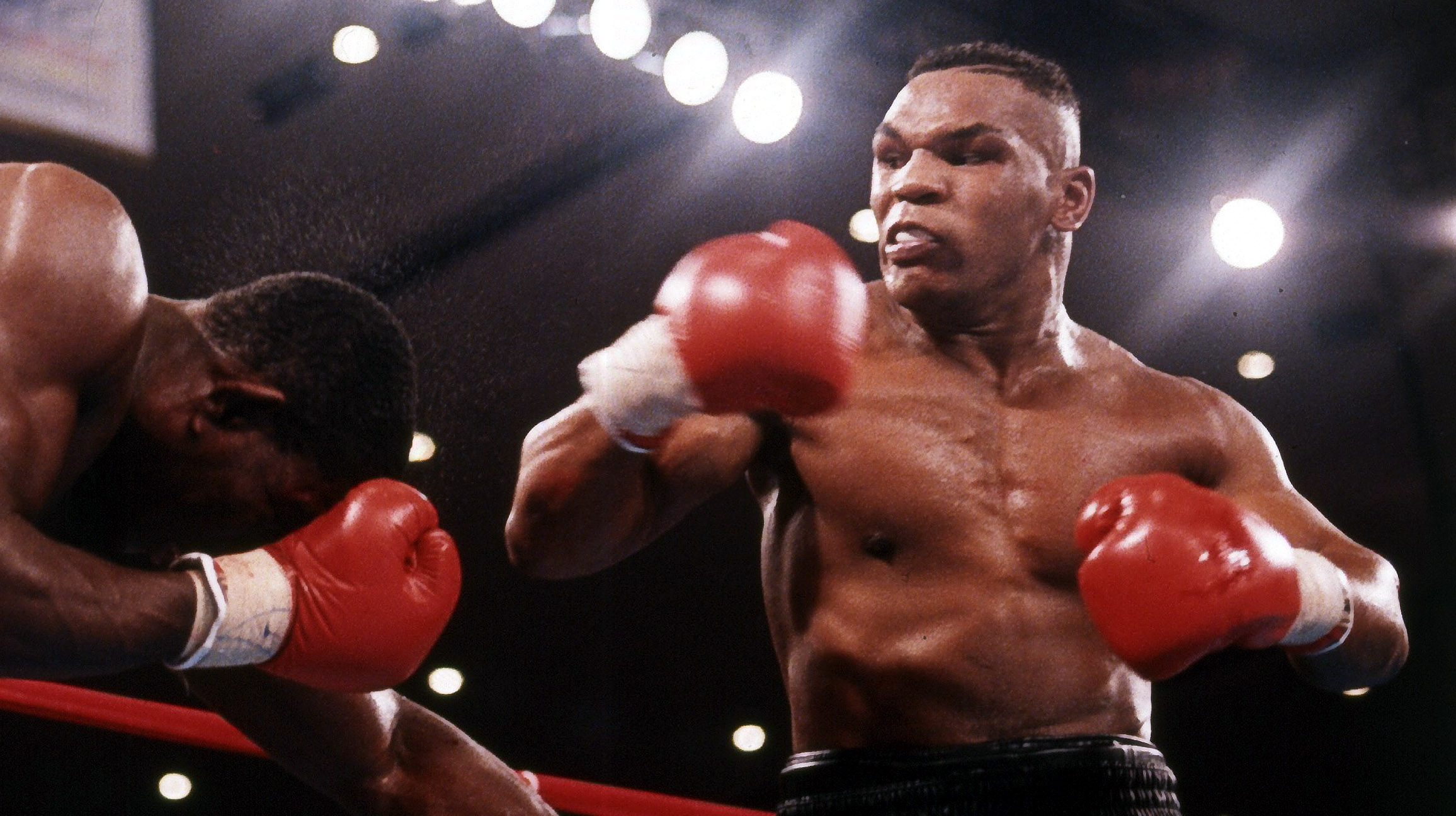
Tyson vs. Bruno

On August 23, 1988, Tyson became involved in a street fight with former opponent Mitch Green outside a clothing store in Harlem, New York. The altercation left Green with a swollen eye and facial injuries, while Tyson fractured the third metacarpal in his right hand. The injury forced the postponement of his scheduled October title defense against Frank Bruno, which was subsequently held in February 1989 in Las Vegas.

In 1989, Tyson had only two fights amid personal turmoil. He faced the British boxer Frank Bruno in February. Bruno managed to stun Tyson at the end of the first round, although Tyson went on to knock Bruno out in the fifth round. Tyson then knocked out Carl "The Truth" Williams in the first round in July.

==== Tyson vs. Douglas ====
By 1990, Tyson seemed to have lost direction, and his personal life was in disarray amidst reports of less vigorous training prior to the Buster Douglas match. In a fight on February 11, 1990, he lost the undisputed championship to Douglas in Tokyo. Tyson was a huge betting favorite; indeed, the Mirage, the only casino to put out odds for the fight, made Tyson a 42/1 favorite. Tyson failed to find a way past Douglas's quick jab that had a 12-inch (30 cm) reach advantage over his own. Tyson did catch Douglas with an uppercut in the eighth round and knocked him to the floor, but Douglas recovered sufficiently to hand Tyson a heavy beating in the subsequent two rounds. After the fight, the Tyson camp would complain that the count was slow and that Douglas had taken longer than ten seconds to get back on his feet. Just 35 seconds into the tenth round, Douglas unleashed a brutal uppercut, followed by a four-punch combination of hooks that knocked Tyson down for the first time in his career. He was counted out by referee Octavio Meyran.

The knockout victory by Douglas over Tyson, the previously undefeated "baddest man on the planet" and arguably the most feared boxer in professional boxing at that time, has been described as one of the most shocking upsets in modern sports history.

=== Return to the ring ===
Despite the shocking loss, Tyson has said that losing to Douglas was the greatest moment of his career: "I needed that fight to make me a better person and fighter. I have a broader perspective of myself and boxing."

After the loss, Tyson recovered with first-round knockouts of Henry Tillman and Alex Stewart in his next two fights. Tyson's victory over Tillman, the 1984 Olympic heavyweight gold medalist, enabled Tyson to avenge his amateur losses at Tillman's hands. These bouts set up an elimination match for another shot at the undisputed world heavyweight championship, which Evander Holyfield had taken from Douglas in his first defense of the title.

==== Tyson vs. Ruddock ====
Tyson, who was the number one contender, faced number two contender Donovan "Razor" Ruddock on March 18, 1991, in Las Vegas. Ruddock was seen as the most dangerous heavyweight around and was thought of as one of the hardest punching heavyweights. Tyson and Ruddock went back and forth for most of the fight, until referee Richard Steele controversially stopped the fight during the seventh round in favor of Tyson. This decision infuriated the fans in attendance, sparking a post-fight melee in the audience. The referee had to be escorted from the ring.

==== Tyson vs. Ruddock II ====
Tyson and Ruddock met again on June 28 that year, with Tyson knocking down Ruddock twice and winning a twelve-round unanimous decision 113–109, 114–108, and 114–108. A fight between Tyson and Holyfield for the undisputed championship was scheduled for November 8, 1991, at Caesars Palace in Las Vegas, but Tyson pulled out after sustaining a rib cartilage injury during training.

=== Comeback ===
Tyson was convicted of the rape charge on February 10, 1992, and was released in 1995. After being paroled from prison, Tyson easily won his comeback bouts against Peter McNeeley and Buster Mathis Jr. Tyson's first comeback fight was marketed as "He's back!" and grossed more than US$96 million worldwide, including a United States record $63 million for PPV television. The viewing of the fight was purchased by 1.52 million homes, setting both PPV viewership and revenue records. The 89-second fight elicited criticism that Tyson's management lined up "tomato cans" to ensure easy victories for his return. TV Guide included the Tyson–McNeeley fight in their list of the 50 Greatest TV Sports Moments of All Time in 1998.

=== Second reign as unified heavyweight champion ===
==== Tyson vs. Bruno II, Seldon ====
Tyson regained one belt by easily winning the WBC title against Frank Bruno in March 1996. It was the second fight between the two, and Tyson knocked out Bruno in the third round. In 1996, Lennox Lewis turned down a $13.5 million guarantee to fight Tyson. This would've been Lewis's highest fight purse to date. Lewis then accepted $4 million from Don King to step aside and allow Tyson to fight Bruce Seldon for an expected $30 million instead with the intention that if Tyson defeated Seldon, he would fight Lewis next. Tyson added the WBA belt by defeating champion Seldon in the first round in September that year. Seldon was severely criticized and mocked in the popular press for seemingly collapsing to innocuous punches from Tyson.

==== Tyson vs. Holyfield ====
Tyson attempted to defend the WBA title against Evander Holyfield, who was in the fourth fight of his own comeback. Holyfield had retired in 1994 following the loss of his championship to Michael Moorer. It was said that Don King and others saw former champion Holyfield, who was 34 at the time of the fight and a huge underdog, as a washed-up fighter.

On November 9, 1996, in Las Vegas, Nevada, Tyson faced Holyfield in a title bout dubbed "Finally". In a surprising turn of events, Holyfield, who was given virtually no chance to win by numerous commentators, defeated Tyson by TKO when referee Mitch Halpern stopped the bout in round eleven. Holyfield became the second boxer to win a heavyweight championship belt three times. Holyfield's victory was marred by allegations from Tyson's camp of Holyfield's frequent headbutts during the bout. Although the headbutts were ruled accidental by the referee, they would become a point of contention in the rematch.

=== Post-title career ===
==== Tyson vs. Holyfield II ====
Tyson and Holyfield fought again on June 28, 1997. Originally, Halpern was supposed to be the referee, but after Tyson's camp protested, Halpern stepped aside in favor of Mills Lane. The highly anticipated rematch was dubbed The Sound and the Fury, and it was held at the Las Vegas MGM Grand Garden Arena, site of the first bout. It was a lucrative event, drawing even more attention than the first bout and grossing $100 million. Tyson received $30 million and Holyfield $35 million, the highest paid professional boxing purses until 2007. The fight was purchased by 1.99 million households, setting a pay-per-view buy rate record that stood until May 5, 2007, being surpassed by Oscar De La Hoya vs. Floyd Mayweather Jr.

Soon to become one of the most controversial events in modern sports, the fight was stopped at the end of the third round, with Tyson disqualified for biting Holyfield on both ears. The first time Tyson bit him, the match was temporarily stopped. Referee Mills Lane deducted two points from Tyson and the fight resumed. However, after the match resumed, Tyson bit him again, resulting in his disqualification, and Holyfield won the match. The first bite was severe enough to remove a piece of Holyfield's right ear, which was found on the ring floor after the fight. Tyson later stated that his actions were retaliation for Holyfield repeatedly headbutting him without penalty. In the confusion that followed the ending of the bout and announcement of the decision, a near riot occurred in the arena and several people were injured. Tyson Holyfield II was the first heavyweight title fight in over 50 years to end in a disqualification.

As a fallout from the incident, US$3 million was immediately withheld from Tyson's $30-million purse by the Nevada state boxing commission (the most it could legally hold back at the time). Two days after the fight, Tyson issued a statement, apologizing to Holyfield for his actions and asked not to be banned for life over the incident. Tyson was roundly condemned in the news media but was not without defenders. Novelist and commentator Katherine Dunn wrote a column that criticized Holyfield's sportsmanship in the controversial bout and charged the news media with being biased against Tyson.

On July 9, 1997, Tyson's boxing license was rescinded by the Nevada Athletic Commission in a unanimous voice vote; he was also fined US$3 million and ordered to pay the legal costs of the hearing. As most state athletic commissions honor sanctions imposed by other states, this effectively made Tyson unable to box in the United States. The revocation was not permanent, as the commission voted 4–1 to restore Tyson's boxing license on October 18, 1998.

During his time away from boxing in 1998, Tyson made a guest appearance at WrestleMania XIV as an enforcer for the main event match between Shawn Michaels and Steve Austin. During this time, Tyson was also an unofficial member of Michaels's stable, D-Generation X. Tyson was paid $3 million for being guest enforcer of the match at WrestleMania XIV.

"I'm the best ever. I'm the most brutal and vicious, the most ruthless champion there has ever been. There's no one can stop me. Lennox is a conqueror? No! I'm Alexander! He's no Alexander! I'm the best ever. There's never been anyone as ruthless. I'm Sonny Liston. I'm Jack Dempsey. There's no one like me. I'm from their cloth. There is no one who can match me. My style is impetuous, my defense is impregnable, and I'm just ferocious. I want your heart! I want to eat his children! Praise be to Allah!"

— Tyson's post-fight interview after knocking out Lou Savarese 38 seconds into the bout in June 2000.

In January 1999, Tyson returned to the ring for a match against the South African Francois Botha. This match also ended in controversy. While Botha initially controlled the fight, Tyson allegedly attempted to break Botha's arms during a tie-up and both boxers were cautioned by the referee in the ill-tempered bout. Botha was ahead on points on all scorecards and was confident enough to mock Tyson as the fight continued. Nonetheless, Tyson landed a straight right hand in the fifth round that knocked out Botha. Critics noticed Tyson stopped using the bob and weave defense altogether following this return. Promoting the fight on Secaucus, New Jersey television station WWOR-TV, Tyson launched into an expletive-laden tirade that forced sports anchor Russ Salzberg to cut the interview short.

Legal problems arose with Tyson once again. On February 5, 1999, Tyson was sentenced to a year's imprisonment, fined $5,000, and ordered to serve two years probation along with undergoing 200 hours of community service for assaulting two motorists after a traffic accident on August 31, 1998. He served nine months of that sentence. After his release, he fought Orlin Norris on October 23, 1999. Tyson knocked down Norris with a left hook thrown after the bell sounded to end the first round. Norris injured his knee when he went down and said that he was unable to continue. Consequently, the bout was ruled a no contest.

In 2000, Tyson had three fights. The first match in January was staged at the MEN Arena in Manchester, England against Julius Francis. Following controversy as to whether Tyson was allowed into the country, he took four minutes to knock out Francis, ending the bout in the second round. He also fought Lou Savarese in June 2000 in Glasgow, winning in the first round; the fight lasted only 38 seconds. Tyson continued punching after the referee had stopped the fight, knocking the referee to the floor as he tried to separate the boxers. It was after this fight that Tyson called out Lennox Lewis with his post fight speech proclaiming to be the "best ever" and declaring, "I'm Sonny Liston. I'm Jack Dempsey … I'm cut from their cloth." In October, Tyson fought the similarly controversial Andrew Golota, winning in round three after Gołota was unable to continue due to a broken cheekbone, concussion, and neck injury. The result was later changed to no contest after Tyson refused to take a pre-fight drug test and then tested positive for marijuana in a post-fight urine test. Tyson fought only once in 2001, beating Brian Nielsen in Copenhagen by TKO in the seventh round.

==== Tyson vs. Lewis ====
Tyson once again had the opportunity to fight for a heavyweight championship in 2002. Lennox Lewis held the WBC, IBF, IBO and Lineal titles at the time. As promising fighters, Tyson and Lewis had sparred at a training camp in a meeting arranged by Cus D'Amato in 1984. Tyson sought to fight Lewis in Nevada for a more lucrative box-office venue, but the Nevada Boxing Commission refused him a license to box as he was facing possible sexual assault charges at the time.

Two years prior to the bout, Tyson had made several inflammatory remarks to Lewis in an interview following the Savarese fight. The remarks included the statement "I want your heart, I want to eat your children." On January 22, 2002, the two boxers and their entourages were involved in a brawl at a New York press conference to publicize the planned event. A few weeks later, the Nevada Athletic Commission refused to grant Tyson a license for the fight, and the promoters had to make alternative arrangements. After multiple states balked at granting Tyson a license, the fight eventually occurred on June 8 at the Pyramid Arena in Memphis, Tennessee. Lewis dominated the fight and knocked out Tyson with a right hand in the eighth round. Tyson was respectful after the fight and praised Lewis on his victory. This fight was the highest-grossing event in pay-per-view history at that time, generating $106.9 million from 1.95 million buys in the US.

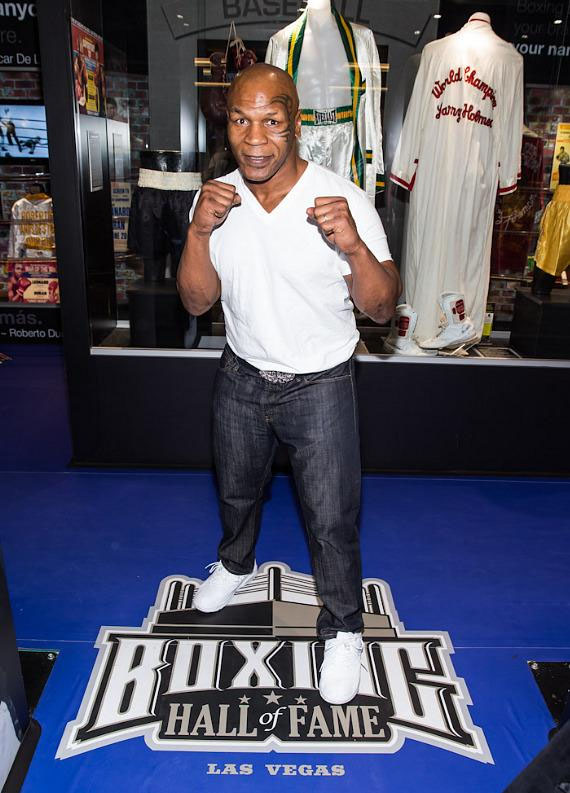
Tyson at the Boxing Hall of Fame, 2013

In another Memphis fight on February 22, 2003, Tyson beat fringe contender Clifford Etienne 49 seconds into round one. The pre-fight was marred by rumors of Tyson's lack of fitness. Some said that he took time out from training to party in Las Vegas and get a new facial tattoo. This eventually proved to be Tyson's final professional victory in the ring.

In August 2003, after years of financial struggles, Tyson filed for bankruptcy. Tyson earned over $30 million for several of his fights and $300 million during his career. At the time, the media reported that he had approximately $23 million in debt.

On August 13, 2003, Tyson entered the ring for a face-to-face confrontation against K-1 fighter Bob Sapp immediately after Sapp's win against Kimo Leopoldo in Las Vegas. K-1 signed Tyson to a contract with the hopes of making a fight happen between the two, but Tyson's felony history made it impossible for him to obtain a visa to enter Japan, where the fight would have been most profitable. Alternative locations were discussed, but the fight ultimately did not take place.

On July 30, 2004, Tyson had a match against British boxer Danny Williams in another comeback fight, and this time, staged in Louisville, Kentucky. Tyson dominated the opening two rounds. The third round was even, with Williams getting in some clean blows and also a few illegal ones, for which he was penalized. In the fourth round, Williams took control of the fight landing a succession of accurate and powerful punches that knocked Tyson down. He failed to beat the count and was thus defeated by KO. After the fight, Tyson's manager claimed that Tyson had torn a ligament in his knee in the first round. This was Tyson's fifth career defeat. He underwent surgery for the ligament four days after the fight. His manager, Shelly Finkel, claimed that Tyson was unable to throw significant right-hand punches since he had a knee injury.

=== Retirement ===
==== Tyson vs. McBride ====
On June 11, 2005, Tyson quit before the start of the seventh round in a close bout against journeyman Kevin McBride. In the 2008 documentary Tyson, he stated that he fought McBride for a payday, that he did not anticipate winning, that he was in poor physical condition and fed up with taking boxing seriously. After losing three of his last four fights, Tyson said he would quit boxing because he felt he had lost his passion for the sport.

In 2000 Tyson dismissed everyone who was working for him and enlisted new accountants, who prepared a statement showing he started the year $3.3 million in debt but earned $65.7 million. In August 2007, Tyson pleaded guilty to drug possession and driving under the influence in an Arizona court, which stemmed from an arrest in December where authorities said Tyson, who has a long history of legal contentions, admitted to using cocaine that day and to being addicted to the drug.

In his 2013 autobiography Undisputed Truth, Tyson admitted to using the urine of his then wife Monica Turner to pass doping tests. He was married to Turner from 1997 to 2003. He also used his infant's urine for the same purpose.

=== Second comeback and second retirement ===
==== Tyson vs. Paul ====
In March 2024, it was announced that Tyson would be making his ring return against Jake Paul in a heavyweight bout on July 20, 2024, at AT&T Stadium in Arlington, Texas. On April 29, 2024, it was announced that the fight would be sanctioned as a professional boxing match by Texas Department of Licensing and Regulations (TDLR). On May 26, 2024, Tyson suffered an ulcer flare-up aboard a plane. On May 31, 2024, it was announced that the fight was postponed per medical advice from Tyson's doctor, allowing him to recover from his ulcer flare-up. On June 7, 2024, it was announced that the fight had been rescheduled and would take place at the same stadium on November 15, 2024.

Paul defeated Tyson via unanimous decision with the judges scoring the bout 80–72, 79–73 and 79–73 in favor of Paul.

== Exhibition bouts ==
=== Mike Tyson's World Tour ===
To help pay off his debts, Tyson announced he would be doing a series of exhibition bouts, calling it Tyson's World Tour. For his first bout, Tyson returned to the ring in 2006 for a four-round exhibition against journeyman heavyweight Corey Sanders in Youngstown, Ohio. Tyson, without headgear at 5 ft 10 in and 216 pounds, was in quality shape, but far from his prime against Sanders, at 6 ft 6 in who wore headgear. Tyson appeared to be "holding back" in the exhibition to prevent an early end to the "show". "If I don't get out of this financial quagmire there's a possibility I may have to be a punching bag for somebody. The money I make isn't going to help my bills from a tremendous standpoint, but I'm going to feel better about myself. I'm not going to be depressed", explained Tyson about the reasons for his "comeback". After the bout was poorly received by fans, the remainder of the tour was canceled.

=== Tyson vs. Jones ===
It was announced in July 2020 that Tyson had signed a contract to face former four-division world champion, Roy Jones Jr., in an eight-round exhibition fight. Mixed martial arts coach Rafael Cordeiro was selected to be Tyson's trainer and cornerman. The bout—officially sanctioned by the California State Athletic Commission (CSAC)—was initially scheduled to take place on September 12 at the Dignity Health Sports Park in Carson, California, however, the date was pushed back to November 28 in order to maximize revenue for the event. The fight went the full eight rounds and was declared a draw. The fight was a split draw and the three judges scored the fight as follows: Chad Dawson (76–76 draw), Christy Martin (79–73 for Tyson), and Vinny Pazienza (76–80 for Jones).

=== Tyson vs. Mayweather ===
On September 4, 2025, it was announced that Tyson and Floyd Mayweather Jr. would fight each other in an exhibition bout some time in Spring 2026. In March 2026, however, Tyson would break his hand while training, resulting in his planned exhibition bout with Mayweather being repeated delayed. As of May 20, 2026, this bout was planned to take place in the fall of 2026. However, Mayweather would later be sued for breach of contract. In June 2026, Mayweather was revealed to be by now more adamant on securing a fight with Mike Zambidis. While Mayweather's planned bout with Zambidis in June 2026 was cancelled due to contract obligations with CSI Sports Events to fight both Tyson and Manny Pacquiao, a judge would later grant Mayweather a motion to pursue this fight. With Mayweather opting to instead focus more on pursuing a bout with Zambidis, as well as still being subjugated to a breach of contract lawsuit, the future of Mayweather's planned exhibition bout with Tyson was deemed uncertain, though Tyson made clear in an interview with Ring that he was still eager to participate in the planned exhibition fight with Mayweather.

== Mike Tyson's Legends Only League ==
In July 2020, Mike Tyson announced the creation of Mike Tyson's Legends Only League. Tyson formed the league in partnership with Sophie Watts and her company, Eros Innovations. The league provides retired professional athletes the opportunity to compete in their respective sport. On November 28, 2020, Mike Tyson fought Roy Jones Jr. at the Staples Center in the first event produced under Legends Only League. The event received largely positive reviews and was the highest selling PPV event of 2020, which ranks in the Top-10 for PPV purchased events all-time.

== Legacy ==
Tyson was The Ring magazine's Fighter of the Year in 1986 and 1988. A 1998 ranking of "The Greatest Heavyweights of All-Time" by The Ring magazine placed Tyson at number 14 on the list. Despite criticism of facing underwhelming competition during his run as champion, Tyson's knockout power and intimidation factor made him the sport's most dynamic box-office draw. According to Douglas Quenqua of The New York Times, "The [1990s] began with Mike Tyson, considered by many to be the last great heavyweight champion, losing his title to the little-known Buster Douglas. Seven years later, Mr. Tyson bit Evander Holyfield's ear in a heavyweight champion bout—hardly a proud moment for the sport."

He is remembered for his attire of black trunks, black shoes with no socks, and a plain white towel fit around his neck in place of a traditional robe, as well as his habit of rapidly pacing the ring before the start of a fight. In his prime, Tyson rarely took a step back and had never been knocked down or seriously challenged. According to Martial Arts World Report, it gave Tyson an Honorable Mention in its Ten Greatest Heavyweights of All Time rather than a ranking because longevity is a factor and the peak period of Tyson's career lasted only about 5 years.

As of April 2025, BoxRec ranks Tyson at No. 24 among the greatest boxers that had their last fight at heavyweight. In The Ring magazine's list of the 80 Best Fighters of the Last 80 Years, released in 2002, Tyson was ranked at number 72. He is ranked number 16 on The Ring magazine's 2003 list of 100 greatest punchers of all time. Tyson has defeated 11 boxers for the world heavyweight title, the seventh-most in history.

On June 12, 2011, Tyson was inducted to the International Boxing Hall of Fame alongside legendary Mexican champion Julio César Chávez, light welterweight champion Kostya Tszyu, and actor/screenwriter Sylvester Stallone. In 2013, Tyson was inducted into the Nevada Boxing Hall of Fame and headlined the induction ceremony. Tyson was inducted into the Southern Nevada Hall of Fame in 2015 along with four other inductees with ties to Southern Nevada.

Tyson reflected on his strongest opponents in ten categories for a 2014 interview with The Ring magazine, including best jab, best defense, fastest hands, fastest feet, best chin, smartest, strongest, best puncher, best boxer, and best overall.

In 2017, The Ring magazine ranked Tyson as number 9 of 20 heavyweight champions based on a poll of panelists that included trainers, matchmakers, media, historians, and boxers, including:

- Trainers: Teddy Atlas, Pat Burns, Virgil Hunter, and Don Turner
- Matchmakers: Eric Bottjer, Don Chargin, Don Elbaum, Bobby Goodman, Ron Katz, Mike Marchionte, Russell Peltz, and Bruce Trampler.
- Media: Al Bernstein, Ron Borges, Gareth A Davies, Norm Frauenheim, Jerry Izenberg, Harold Lederman, Paulie Malignaggi, Dan Rafael, and Michael Rosenthal
- Historians: Craig Hamilton, Steve Lott, Don McRae, Bob Mee, Clay Moyle, Adam Pollack, and Randy Roberts
- Boxers: Lennox Lewis and Mike Tyson participated in the poll, but neither fighter ranked himself. Instead, a weighted average from the other panelists was assigned to their respective slots on their ballots.

In 2020, Bill Caplan of The Ring magazine listed Tyson as number 17 of the 20 greatest heavyweights of all time. Tyson spoke with The Ring magazine in 2020 about his six greatest victories, those over Trevor Berbick, Pinklon Thomas, Tony Tucker, Tyrell Biggs, Larry Holmes, and Michael Spinks. In 2020, CBS Sports boxing experts Brian Campbell and Brent Brookhouse ranked the top 10 heavyweights of the last 50 years and Tyson was ranked number 7.

== Trial and incarceration ==
Tyson was arrested in July 1991 for the rape of 18-year-old Desiree Washington at the Canterbury Hotel in Indianapolis. Washington, who had previously been crowned "Miss Black Rhode Island", was a contestant in the Miss Black America pageant, rehearsals for which were being held in the city. Tyson was charged with "one count of rape, two counts of criminal deviate conduct, and one count of criminal confinement—charges that carried a maximum sentence of 63 years". Tyson's rape trial at the Marion County superior court lasted from January 26 to February 10, 1992.

Washington herself testified that Tyson had "called her around 1:45 a.m. to tour the city, then picked her up in his limo, took her back to his room, and made small talk as they both sat on the bed". After propositioning her for sex, Washington stated that she firmly refused and went to use the bathroom before leaving. "After using the bathroom, she said, she noticed some discharge on her panty shield. Washington said she removed the liner and threw it away." When she came out, "Tyson then pulled her to the bed, pinned her down and raped her, she testified. 'He was mean, evil,' she said. 'I got on top and started to try to get away, but he slammed me down again.'" "Three days after the assault, Washington went to the police and accused Tyson of rape." Partial corroboration of Washington's story came via testimony from Tyson's chauffeur, Virginia Foster, who confirmed Desiree Washington's "state of shock" after the incident. Foster also testified that Tyson had previously attempted to sexually assault her, too, having "lured her to his hotel room, tried to touch her, and then exposed himself". Further testimony came from the emergency room physician, Dr. Thomas Richardson, who examined Washington after the incident and confirmed that Washington's physical condition was consistent with rape. Richardson testified that Washington had suffered "two small vaginal abrasions, consistent with 20 to 30 percent of the injuries seen in sexual assault cases", and that in approximately 20,000 cases over a period of 20 years, "only twice [...] had he ever seen such abrasions following consensual sex."

Under lead defense lawyer Vincent J. Fuller's direct examination, Tyson claimed that everything had taken place with Washington's full consent and he claimed not to have forced himself upon her. When he was cross-examined by lead prosecutor Gregory Garrison, Tyson denied claims that he had misled Washington and insisted that she wanted to have sex with him. "In a misguided attempt to show that Washington must have known that Tyson wanted sex, the defense called witness after witness to testify about their client's lewd remarks and crude behavior during his encounters with the Miss Black America contestants, and even with Washington herself." Former attorney Mark Shaw argued that Tyson's "case was mishandled, citing a jury-selection process that allowed a conservative ex-Marine to become foreman, a defense 'strategy' of making Tyson look as bad as possible, and a disastrous decision to allow the defendant to testify at the grand jury hearing, the trial, and his sentencing."

Despite Fuller's reputation as

one of the most skillful and respected defense attorneys not only in Washington, but in the country [...] the defense team embarked on a game plan filled with ill-fated decisions and questionable strategies. [...] While the famous Fuller seemed to give Tyson an imposing advantage, his background made him an illogical choice. [...] Though he'd represented such notables as John Hinckley Jr. and junk-bond king Michael Milken, his reputation came mostly from federal court white-collar cases such as tax fraud and bribery. He simply wasn't familiar with the rough-and-tumble county criminal courts, and lacked recent experience in sex-crime cases. He couldn't locate exhibits, fumbled his delivery, exhibited a lack of knowledge of Indiana law, and generally handled Tyson's defense more like a first-year law student than a seasoned pro.

Fuller had also successfully defended Tyson's manager, Don King, "against federal tax-evasion charges" in 1985, which may have been one of the reasons King chose him to represent Tyson. Tyson himself would later describe Fuller as "a horrible lawyer". According to Shaw, Fuller "never challenged obvious problems in Washington's story. Exactly why did she remove her panty shield? How did Tyson perform oral sex on her and still keep her pinned to the bed? If Tyson is one of the strongest men in the world, where were the bruises on the 108-pound woman?"

Tyson was convicted of the rape charge on February 10, 1992, after the jury deliberated for nearly 10 hours.

Alan Dershowitz, acting as Tyson's counsel, filed an appeal urging error of law in the Court's exclusion of evidence of the victim's past sexual conduct (known as the Rape Shield Law; Dershowitz alleged that Washington had "falsely accused one of her high school classmates of rape"), the exclusion of three potential defense witnesses, and the lack of jury instructions on honest and reasonable mistake of fact. The Indiana Court of Appeals ruled against Tyson in a 2–1 vote. The Indiana Supreme Court let the lower court opinion stand due to a 2–2 split in its review. The tie vote was due to the fact that the Chief Justice, Randall T. Shepard, recused himself from the case. Shepard later revealed that he did so because of a heated argument between his wife and Dershowitz at a Yale Law School reunion concerning the case. On March 26, 1992, Tyson was sentenced to six years in prison along with four years of probation. He was assigned to the Indiana Youth Center (now the Plainfield Correctional Facility) in April 1992, and he was released in March 1995 after serving less than three years of the sentence. He left with prison tattoos of tennis player Arthur Ashe and Chinese communist leader Mao Zedong; Tyson also dates his tattoo of Marxist revolutionary Che Guevara to this time.

Due to his conviction, Tyson was required to register as a Tier II sex offender under federal law. Tyson has continued to maintain his innocence. In 1992, Erinn Cosby, the daughter of comedian and actor Bill Cosby, publicly accused Tyson of sexually assaulting her in 1989, although no criminal charges were ever sought.

== Life outside of boxing ==
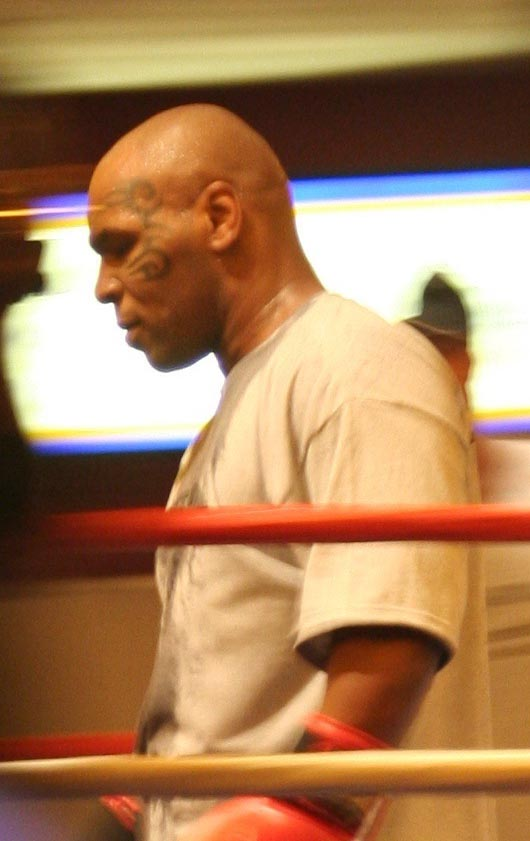
Tyson in 2006

In an interview with USA Today published on June 3, 2005, Tyson said, "My whole life has been a waste – I've been a failure." He continued: "I just want to escape. I'm really embarrassed with myself and my life. I want to be a missionary. I think I could do that while keeping my dignity without letting people know they chased me out of the country. I want to get this part of my life over as soon as possible. In this country nothing good is going to come of me. People put me so high; I wanted to tear that image down." Tyson began to spend much of his time tending to his 350 pigeons in Paradise Valley, an upscale enclave near Phoenix, Arizona.

Tyson has stayed in the limelight by promoting various websites and companies. In the past Tyson had shunned endorsements, accusing other athletes of putting on a false front to obtain them. Tyson has held entertainment boxing shows at a casino in Las Vegas and started a tour of exhibition bouts to pay off his numerous debts.

In October 2012, Tyson launched the Mike Tyson Cares Foundation. The mission of the Mike Tyson Cares Foundation is to "give kids a fighting chance" with innovative centers that provide for the comprehensive needs of kids from broken homes.

In August 2013, Tyson teamed up with Acquinity Sports to form Iron Mike Productions, a boxing promotions company.

In September 2013, Tyson was featured on a six-episode television series on Fox Sports 1 that documented his personal and private life entitled Being: Mike Tyson.

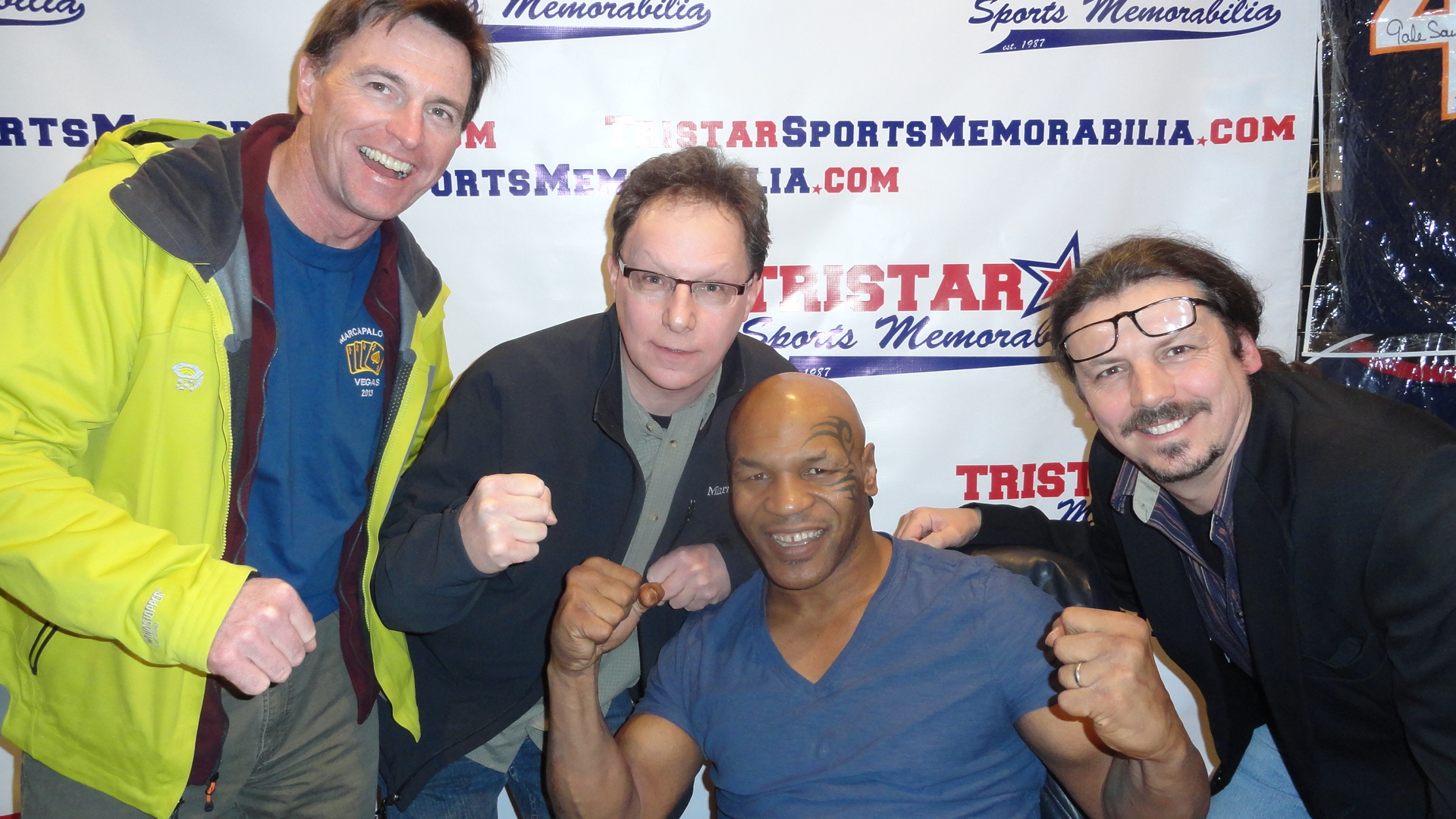
Tyson in February 2013

In November 2013, Tyson's Undisputed Truth was published, which appeared on The New York Times Best Seller list. At the Golden Podium Awards Ceremony, Tyson received the Sportel Special Prize for the best autobiography.

In May 2017, Tyson published his second memoir, Iron Ambition, which details his time with trainer and surrogate father Cus D'Amato. Both were written with Larry Sloman.

In February 2018, Tyson attended the international mixed martial arts (MMA) tournament in the Russian city of Chelyabinsk. Tyson said: "As I have travelled all over the country of Russia I have realised that the people are very sensitive and kind. But most Americans do not have any experience of that."

On May 12, 2020, Tyson posted a video on his Instagram of him training again. At the end of the video, Tyson hinted at a return to boxing by saying, "I'm back".

On May 23, 2020, at All Elite Wrestling's Double or Nothing, Tyson helped Cody defeat Lance Archer alongside Jake Roberts and presented him the inaugural AEW TNT Championship. Tyson alongside Henry Cejudo, Rashad Evans, and Vitor Belfort appeared on the May 27 episode of AEW Dynamite facing off against Chris Jericho and his stable The Inner Circle. Tyson returned to AEW on the April 7, 2021, episode of Dynamite and helped Jericho from being attacked by The Pinnacle, beating down Shawn Spears in the process. He was the special guest enforcer on the April 14 episode of Dynamite for a match between Jericho and Dax Harwood of The Pinnacle, a preview of the upcoming Inner Circle vs. Pinnacle match at Blood and Guts.

Tyson made an extended cameo appearance in the Telugu-Hindi movie Liger, which released on August 25, 2022.

Tyson has also taken up the hobby of pigeon racing, stating that the birds "got him out of trouble." Tyson claims to own hundreds of the birds and possibly a thousand.

== Personal life ==
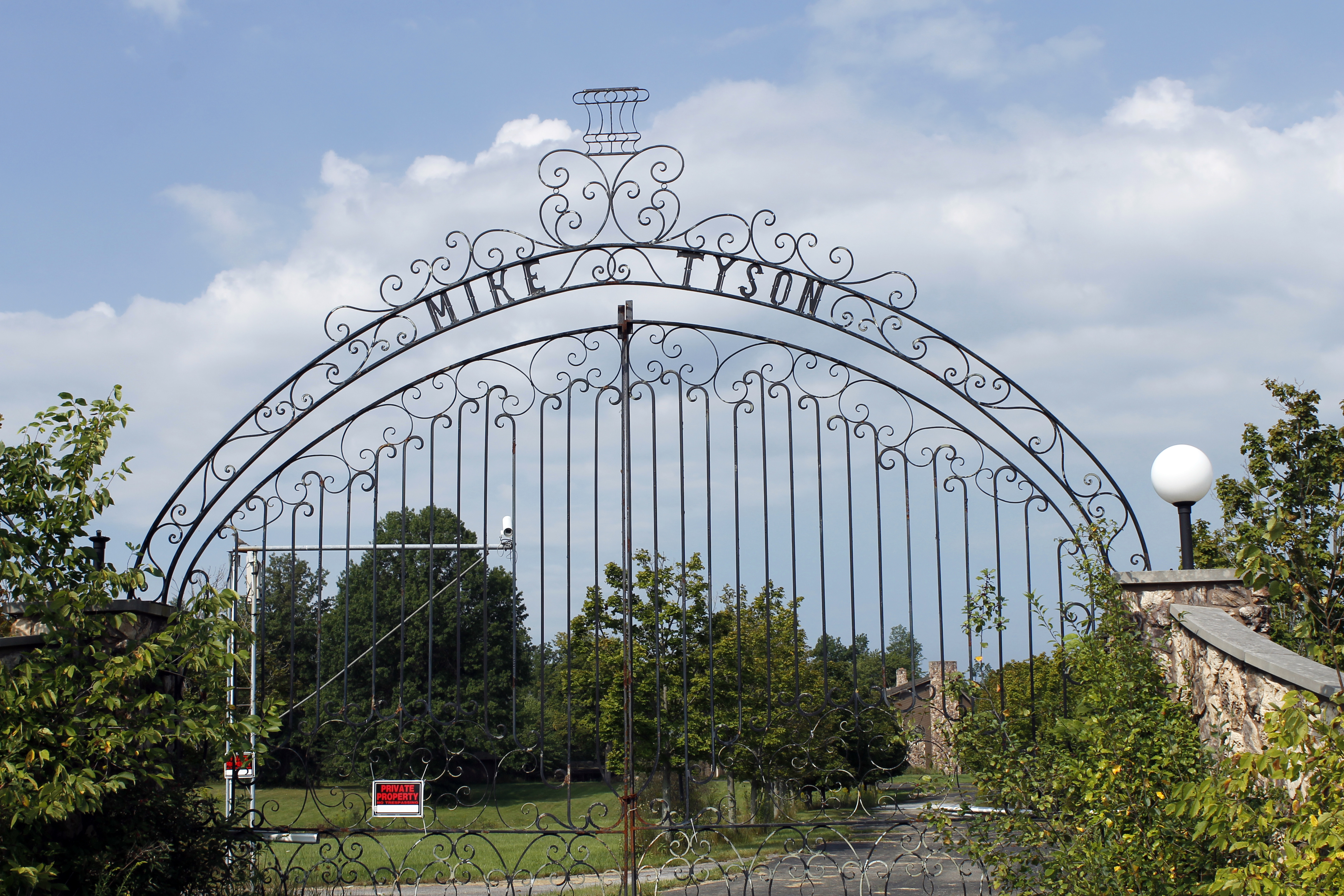
The gates of Tyson's mansion in Southington, Ohio, which he purchased and lived in during the 1980s

=== Marriages and children ===
Tyson resides in the Seven Hills community in Henderson, Nevada. He has been married three times, and has seven children, one deceased, with three women; in addition to his biological children, Tyson includes his second wife's oldest daughter as one of his own.

Tyson married actress Robin Givens on February 7, 1988, at Holy Angels Catholic Church during a traditional ceremony in Chicago. Givens was known at the time for her role on the sitcom Head of the Class. Tyson's marriage to Givens was especially tumultuous, with allegations of violence, spousal abuse, and mental instability on Tyson's part.

Matters came to a head when Tyson and Givens gave a joint interview with Barbara Walters on the ABC TV news magazine show 20/20 in September 1988, in which Givens described life with Tyson as "torture, pure hell, worse than anything I could possibly imagine." Givens also described Tyson as "manic depressive" – which was later confirmed by doctors – on national television while Tyson looked on with an intent and calm expression. A month later, Givens announced that she was seeking a divorce from the allegedly abusive Tyson, with the two officially separating on February 14, 1989.

According to the book Fire and Fear: The Inside Story of Mike Tyson, Tyson admitted that he punched Givens and stated, "that was the best punch I've ever thrown in my entire life." Tyson claimed that the book was "filled with inaccuracies." Tyson and Givens had no children, but she reported having had a miscarriage; Tyson claimed that she was never pregnant and only used that to get him to marry her. During their marriage, the couple lived in a mansion in Bernardsville, New Jersey.

Tyson's second marriage was to Monica Turner from April 19, 1997, to January 14, 2003. At the time of the divorce filing, Turner worked as a pediatric resident at Georgetown University Medical Center in Washington, D.C. She is the sister of Michael Steele, the former Lieutenant Governor of Maryland and former Republican National Committee chairman. Turner filed for divorce from Tyson in January 2002, claiming that he committed adultery during their five-year marriage, an act that "has neither been forgiven nor condoned." The couple had two children.

On May 25, 2009, Tyson's four-year-old daughter, Exodus, was found by her seven-year-old brother, unconscious and tangled in a cord, dangling from an exercise treadmill. The child's mother untangled her, administered CPR and called for medical attention. Tyson, who was in Las Vegas at the time of the incident, traveled back to Phoenix to be with her. She died of her injuries on May 26, 2009.

Eleven days after his daughter's death, Tyson wed for the third time, to longtime girlfriend Lakiha "Kiki" Spicer, age 32, exchanging vows on June 6, 2009, in a short, private ceremony at the La Bella Wedding Chapel at the Las Vegas Hilton. They have two children.

=== Religious beliefs ===
Raised as a Catholic, in 1988, he became a Baptist and was baptized at Holy Trinity Baptist Church in Cleveland. He later converted to Islam. Tyson has stated that he converted to Islam before entering prison and that he made no efforts to correct what was reported in the media. Falsely, it was claimed that his conversion happened during prison and that he adopted the Muslim name Malik Abdul Aziz; some sources report it as Malik Shabazz. Tyson never changed his given name to an Islamic one, despite the rumors.

In November 2013, Tyson stated "the more I look into the churches and mosques for god, the more I start seeing the devil". But, just a month later, in a December 2013 interview with Fox News, Tyson said that he is very grateful to be a Muslim and that he needs Allah in his life. In the same interview Tyson talked about his progress with sobriety and how being in the company of good people has made him want to be a better and more humble person.

He first completed the Islamic pilgrimage Umrah in July 2010. He did so again in December 2022 while accompanied by DJ Khaled, a Palestinian American Muslim.

=== Diet ===
In March 2011, Tyson appeared on The Ellen DeGeneres Show to discuss his new Animal Planet reality series Taking On Tyson. In the interview with DeGeneres, Tyson discussed some of the ways he had improved his life in the past two years, including sober living and a vegan diet. However, in August 2013 he admitted publicly that he had lied about his sobriety and was on the verge of death from alcoholism.

Tyson also revealed that he is no longer vegan, stating, "I was a vegan for four years but not anymore. I eat chicken every now and then. I should be a vegan. [No red meat] at all, no way! I would be very sick if I ate red meat. That's probably why I was so crazy before."

=== Political views ===
In 2015, Tyson announced that he was supporting Donald Trump's presidential candidacy.

=== Controversies and legal challenges ===
On December 29, 2006, Tyson was arrested in Scottsdale, Arizona, on suspicion of DUI and felony drug possession; he nearly crashed into a police SUV shortly after leaving a nightclub. According to a police probable-cause statement, filed in Maricopa County Superior Court, "[Tyson] admitted to using [drugs] today and stated he is an addict and has a problem." Tyson pleaded not guilty on January 22, 2007, in Maricopa County Superior Court to felony drug possession and paraphernalia possession counts and two misdemeanor counts of driving under the influence of drugs. On February 8 he checked himself into an inpatient treatment program for "various addictions" while awaiting trial on the drug charges.

On September 24, 2007, Tyson pleaded guilty to possession of cocaine and driving under the influence. He was convicted of these charges in November 2007 and sentenced to 24 hours in jail. After his release, he was ordered to serve three years' probation and complete 360 hours of community service. Prosecutors had requested a year-long jail sentence, but the judge praised Tyson for seeking help with his drug problems. On November 11, 2009, Tyson was arrested after getting into a scuffle at Los Angeles International airport with a photographer. No charges were filed.

In September 2011, Tyson gave an interview in which he made comments about former Alaska governor Sarah Palin including crude and violent descriptions of interracial sex. These comments were reprinted on The Daily Caller website. Journalist Greta van Susteren criticized Tyson and The Daily Caller over the comments, which she described as "smut" and "violence against women".

On April 20, 2022, on a JetBlue flight from San Francisco to Florida, Tyson repeatedly punched a male passenger who was harassing him, including throwing water on Tyson; he did not face criminal charges.

In November 2023, Tyson found himself amidst criticism and rumors regarding his alleged donation to the Israeli Defense Forces after he was photographed attending a November 13 event sponsored by Friends of the IDF (FIDF) to fundraise for the Gaza war, which seemed to clash with his previous statements about Palestinians. This led to a social media backlash, prompting Tyson to release the following statement on Instagram:

"I want to clarify the recent portrayal of an event I attended," he wrote on Thursday. "Invited for a casual evening out by a friend, I was unaware of the arranged fundraiser and no donations were made by me or on my behalf. As a Muslim and human, I support peace. My prayers have been and continue to be with my brothers and sisters."

== In popular culture ==
At the height of his fame and career in the late 1980s and throughout the 1990s, Tyson was among the most recognized sports personalities in the world. In addition to his many sporting accomplishments, his outrageous and controversial behavior in the ring and in his private life has kept him in the public eye and in the courtroom. As such, Tyson has been the subject of myriad popular media including movies, television, books and music. He has also been featured in video games and as a subject of parody or satire. Tyson became involved in professional wrestling and has made many cameo appearances in film and television.

In 1987, he was featured as the final boss in the NES video game Mike Tyson's Punch-Out!!.

The film Tyson was released in 1995 and was directed by Uli Edel. It explores the life of Mike Tyson, from the death of his guardian and trainer Cus D'Amato to his rape conviction. Tyson is played by Michael Jai White.

In 2006, Tyson appeared as himself in a cameo role in the film Rocky Balboa.

Published in 2007, author Joe Layden's book The Last Great Fight: The Extraordinary Tale of Two Men and How One Fight Changed Their Lives Forever, chronicled the lives of Tyson and Douglas before and after their heavyweight championship fight.

In 2008, the documentary Tyson premiered at the annual Cannes Film Festival in France.

Tyson played a fictionalized version of himself in the 2009 film The Hangover.

After debuting a one-man show in Las Vegas, Tyson collaborated with film director Spike Lee and brought the show to Broadway in August 2012. In February 2013, Tyson took his one-man show Mike Tyson: Undisputed Truth on a 36-city, three-month national tour. Tyson talks about his personal and professional life on stage. The one-man show was aired on HBO on November 16, 2013.

In 2013, he appeared in an episode of Law & Order: Special Victims Unit as a survivor of child-abuse awaiting execution for murder.

He is the titular character in Mike Tyson Mysteries, which started airing on October 27, 2014, on Adult Swim. In the animated series, Tyson voices a fictionalized version of himself, solving mysteries in the style of Scooby-Doo.

In early March 2015, Tyson appeared on the track "Iconic" on Madonna's album Rebel Heart. Tyson says some lines at the beginning of the song.

In late March 2015, Ip Man 3 was announced. With Donnie Yen reprising his role as the titular character, Bruce Lee's martial arts master, Ip Man, while Mike Tyson joined the cast as Frank, an American property developer and proficient boxer. Principal photography began on March 25, 2015, and was premiered in Hong Kong on December 16, 2015.

In January 2017, Tyson launched his YouTube channel with Shots Studios, a comedy video and comedy music production company with young digital stars like Lele Pons and Rudy Mancuso. Tyson's channel includes parody music videos and comedy sketches.

He hosts the podcast Hotboxin' with Mike Tyson.

In October 2017, Tyson was announced as the new face of Australian car servicing franchise Ultra Tune. He took over from Jean-Claude van Damme in fronting television commercials for the brand, and the first advert aired in January 2018 during the Australian Open. However, the ad was quickly attacked, even leading Tyson himself to describe it as "a little sexist."

A joint Mainland China-Hong Kong-directed film on female friendship titled Girls 2: Girls vs Gangsters (Vietnamese: Girls 2: Những Cô Gái và Găng Tơ) that was shot earlier from July–August 2016 at several locations around Vietnam was released in March 2018, featuring Tyson as "Dragon".

Tiki Lau released a dance music single, "Mike Tyson", in October 2020, which includes vocals from Tyson.

In 2021, Mike's Hard Lemonade Seltzer featured ads with Tyson.

In March 2021, it was announced that Jamie Foxx will star in, and also executive produce the official scripted series Tyson. The limited series will be directed by Antoine Fuqua and executive produced by Martin Scorsese.

A two-part documentary series titled Mike Tyson: The Knockout premiered on May 25, 2021, on ABC.

Tyson and his family appeared in the 300th episode of Hell's Kitchen as VIP guests in the Blue Team's kitchen during Season 20's opening dinner service that aired on June 7, 2021.

On August 25, 2022, Hulu released a biographical drama limited series about Tyson, entitled Mike, depicting his life and career. On August 6, 2022, Tyson spoke out about the series, saying, "Hulu stole my story" and telling the service that "I'm not a n****r you can sell on the auction block."

== Professional boxing record ==
59 fights	50 wins	7 losses
By knockout	44	5
By decision	5	1
By disqualification	1	1
No contests	2	

No.	Result	Record	Opponent	Type	Round, time	Date	Age	Location	Notes
59	Loss	50–7 (2)	Jake Paul	UD	8	Nov 15, 2024	58 years, 138 days	AT&T Stadium, Arlington, Texas, U.S.	
58	Loss	50–6 (2)	Kevin McBride	RTD	6 (10), 3:00	Jun 11, 2005	38 years, 346 days	MCI Center, Washington, D.C., U.S.	
57	Loss	50–5 (2)	Danny Williams	KO	4 (10), 2:51	Jul 30, 2004	38 years, 30 days	Freedom Hall, Louisville, Kentucky, U.S.	
56	Win	50–4 (2)	Clifford Etienne	KO	1 (10), 0:49	Feb 22, 2003	36 years, 237 days	The Pyramid, Memphis, Tennessee, U.S.	
55	Loss	49–4 (2)	Lennox Lewis	KO	8 (12), 2:25	Jun 8, 2002	35 years, 343 days	The Pyramid, Memphis, Tennessee, U.S.	For WBC, IBF, IBO, and The Ring heavyweight titles
54	Win	49–3 (2)	Brian Nielsen	RTD	6 (10), 3:00	Oct 13, 2001	35 years, 115 days	Parken Stadium, Copenhagen, Denmark	
53	NC	48–3 (2)	Andrew Golota	RTD	3 (10), 3:00	Oct 20, 2000	34 years, 112 days	The Palace, Auburn Hills, Michigan, U.S.	Originally RTD win for Tyson, later ruled NC after he failed a drug test for marijuana
52	Win	48–3 (1)	Lou Savarese	TKO	1 (10), 0:38	Jun 24, 2000	33 years, 360 days	Hampden Park, Glasgow, Scotland	
51	Win	47–3 (1)	Julius Francis	TKO	2 (10), 1:03	Jan 29, 2000	33 years, 213 days	MEN Arena, Manchester, England	
50	NC	46–3 (1)	Orlin Norris	NC	1 (10), 3:00	Oct 23, 1999	33 years, 115 days	MGM Grand Garden Arena, Paradise, Nevada, U.S.	Norris unable to continue after a Tyson foul
49	Win	46–3	Francois Botha	KO	5 (10), 2:59	Jan 16, 1999	32 years, 200 days	MGM Grand Garden Arena, Paradise, Nevada, U.S.	
48	Loss	45–3	Evander Holyfield	DQ	3 (12), 3:00	Jun 28, 1997	30 years, 363 days	MGM Grand Garden Arena, Paradise, Nevada, U.S.	For WBA heavyweight title; Tyson disqualified for biting
47	Loss	45–2	Evander Holyfield	TKO	11 (12), 0:37	Nov 9, 1996	30 years, 132 days	MGM Grand Garden Arena, Paradise, Nevada, U.S.	Lost WBA heavyweight title
46	Win	45–1	Bruce Seldon	TKO	1 (12), 1:49	Sep 7, 1996	30 years, 69 days	MGM Grand Garden Arena, Paradise, Nevada, U.S.	Won WBA heavyweight title
45	Win	44–1	Frank Bruno	TKO	3 (12), 0:50	Mar 16, 1996	29 years, 260 days	MGM Grand Garden Arena, Paradise, Nevada, U.S.	Won WBC heavyweight title
44	Win	43–1	Buster Mathis Jr.	KO	3 (12), 2:32	Dec 16, 1995	29 years, 169 days	CoreStates Spectrum, Philadelphia, Pennsylvania, U.S.	
43	Win	42–1	Peter McNeeley	DQ	1 (10), 1:29	Aug 19, 1995	29 years, 50 days	MGM Grand Garden Arena, Paradise, Nevada, U.S.	McNeeley disqualified after his manager entered the ring
42	Win	41–1	Donovan Ruddock	UD	12	Jun 28, 1991	24 years, 363 days	The Mirage, Paradise, Nevada, U.S.	
41	Win	40–1	Donovan Ruddock	TKO	7 (12), 2:22	Mar 18, 1991	24 years, 261 days	The Mirage, Paradise, Nevada, U.S.	
40	Win	39–1	Alex Stewart	TKO	1 (10), 2:27	Dec 8, 1990	24 years, 161 days	Convention Hall, Atlantic City, New Jersey, U.S.	
39	Win	38–1	Henry Tillman	KO	1 (10), 2:47	Jun 16, 1990	23 years, 351 days	Caesars Palace, Paradise, Nevada, U.S.	
38	Loss	37–1	Buster Douglas	KO	10 (12), 1:22	Feb 11, 1990	23 years, 226 days	Tokyo Dome, Tokyo, Japan	Lost WBA, WBC, and IBF heavyweight titles
37	Win	37–0	Carl Williams	TKO	1 (12), 1:33	Jul 21, 1989	23 years, 21 days	Convention Hall, Atlantic City, New Jersey, U.S.	Retained WBA, WBC, IBF, and The Ring heavyweight titles
36	Win	36–0	Frank Bruno	TKO	5 (12), 2:55	Feb 25, 1989	22 years, 240 days	Las Vegas Hilton, Winchester, Nevada, U.S.	Retained WBA, WBC, IBF, and The Ring heavyweight titles
35	Win	35–0	Michael Spinks	KO	1 (12), 1:31	Jun 27, 1988	21 years, 363 days	Convention Hall, Atlantic City, New Jersey, U.S.	Retained WBA, WBC, and IBF heavyweight titles; Won The Ring heavyweight title
34	Win	34–0	Tony Tubbs	TKO	2 (12), 2:54	Mar 21, 1988	21 years, 265 days	Tokyo Dome, Tokyo, Japan	Retained WBA, WBC, and IBF heavyweight titles
33	Win	33–0	Larry Holmes	TKO	4 (12), 2:55	Jan 22, 1988	21 years, 186 days	Convention Hall, Atlantic City, New Jersey, U.S.	Retained WBA, WBC, and IBF heavyweight titles
32	Win	32–0	Tyrell Biggs	TKO	7 (15), 2:59	Oct 16, 1987	21 years, 108 days	Convention Hall, Atlantic City, New Jersey, U.S.	Retained WBA, WBC, and IBF heavyweight titles
31	Win	31–0	Tony Tucker	UD	12	Aug 1, 1987	21 years, 32 days	Las Vegas Hilton, Winchester, Nevada, U.S.	Retained WBA and WBC heavyweight titles; Won IBF heavyweight title; Heavyweight unification series
30	Win	30–0	Pinklon Thomas	TKO	6 (12), 2:00	May 30, 1987	20 years, 334 days	Las Vegas Hilton, Winchester Nevada, U.S.	Retained WBA and WBC heavyweight titles; Heavyweight unification series
29	Win	29–0	James Smith	UD	12	Mar 7, 1987	20 years, 250 days	Las Vegas Hilton, Winchester, Nevada, U.S.	Retained WBC heavyweight title; Won WBA heavyweight title; Heavyweight unification series
28	Win	28–0	Trevor Berbick	TKO	2 (12), 2:35	Nov 22, 1986	20 years, 145 days	Las Vegas Hilton, Winchester, Nevada, U.S.	Won WBC heavyweight title
27	Win	27–0	Alfonso Ratliff	TKO	2 (10), 1:41	Sep 6, 1986	20 years, 68 days	Las Vegas Hilton, Winchester, Nevada, U.S.	
26	Win	26–0	José Ribalta	TKO	10 (10), 1:37	Aug 17, 1986	20 years, 48 days	Trump Plaza Hotel and Casino, Atlantic City, New Jersey, U.S.	
25	Win	25–0	Marvis Frazier	KO	1 (10), 0:30	Jul 26, 1986	20 years, 26 days	Civic Center, Glens Falls, New York, U.S.	
24	Win	24–0	Lorenzo Boyd	KO	2 (10), 1:43	Jul 11, 1986	20 years, 11 days	Stevensville Hotel, Swan Lake, New York, U.S.	
23	Win	23–0	William Hosea	KO	1 (10), 2:03	Jun 28, 1986	19 years, 363 days	Houston Field House, Troy, New York, U.S.	
22	Win	22–0	Reggie Gross	TKO	1 (10), 2:36	Jun 13, 1986	19 years, 348 days	Madison Square Garden, New York City, New York, U.S.	
21	Win	21–0	Mitch Green	UD	10	May 20, 1986	19 years, 324 days	Madison Square Garden, New York City, New York, U.S.	
20	Win	20–0	James Tillis	UD	10	May 3, 1986	19 years, 307 days	Civic Center, Glens Falls, New York, U.S.	
19	Win	19–0	Steve Zouski	KO	3 (10), 2:39	Mar 10, 1986	19 years, 253 days	Nassau Veterans Memorial Coliseum, Uniondale, New York, U.S.	
18	Win	18–0	Jesse Ferguson	TKO	6 (10), 1:19	Feb 16, 1986	19 years, 231 days	Houston Field House, Troy, New York, U.S.	Originally DQ win for Tyson, later ruled TKO
17	Win	17–0	Mike Jameson	TKO	5 (8), 0:46	Jan 24, 1986	19 years, 208 days	Trump Plaza Hotel and Casino, Atlantic City, New Jersey, U.S.	
16	Win	16–0	David Jaco	TKO	1 (10), 2:16	Jan 11, 1986	19 years, 195 days	Plaza Convention Center, Albany, New York, U.S.	
15	Win	15–0	Mark Young	TKO	1 (10), 0:50	Dec 27, 1985	19 years, 180 days	Latham Coliseum, Latham, New York, U.S.	
14	Win	14–0	Sammy Scaff	TKO	1 (10), 1:19	Dec 6, 1985	19 years, 159 days	Felt Forum, New York City, New York, U.S.	
13	Win	13–0	Conroy Nelson	TKO	2 (8), 0:30	Nov 22, 1985	19 years, 145 days	Latham Coliseum, Latham, New York, U.S.	
12	Win	12–0	Eddie Richardson	KO	1 (8), 1:17	Nov 13, 1985	19 years, 136 days	Ramada Hotel, Houston, Texas, U.S.	
11	Win	11–0	Sterling Benjamin	TKO	1 (8), 0:54	Nov 1, 1985	19 years, 124 days	Latham Coliseum, Latham, New York, U.S.	
10	Win	10–0	Robert Colay	KO	1 (8), 0:37	Oct 25, 1985	19 years, 117 days	Atlantis Hotel and Casino, Atlantic City, New Jersey, U.S.	
9	Win	9–0	Donnie Long	TKO	1 (6), 1:28	Oct 9, 1985	19 years, 101 days	Trump Plaza Hotel and Casino, Atlantic City, New Jersey, U.S.	
8	Win	8–0	Michael Johnson	KO	1 (6), 0:39	Sep 5, 1985	19 years, 67 days	Atlantis Hotel and Casino, Atlantic City, New Jersey, U.S.	
7	Win	7–0	Lorenzo Canady	KO	1 (6), 1:05	Aug 15, 1985	19 years, 46 days	Steel Pier, Atlantic City, New Jersey, U.S.	
6	Win	6–0	Larry Sims	KO	3 (6), 2:04	Jul 19, 1985	19 years, 19 days	Mid-Hudson Civic Center, Poughkeepsie, New York, U.S.	
5	Win	5–0	John Alderson	TKO	2 (6), 3:00	Jul 11, 1985	19 years, 11 days	Trump Plaza Hotel and Casino, Atlantic City, New Jersey, U.S.	
4	Win	4–0	Ricardo Spain	TKO	1 (6), 0:39	Jun 20, 1985	18 years, 355 days	Steel Pier, Atlantic City, New Jersey, U.S.	
3	Win	3–0	Don Halpin	KO	4 (6), 1:04	May 23, 1985	18 years, 327 days	Albany, New York, U.S.	
2	Win	2–0	Trent Singleton	TKO	1 (4), 0:52	Apr 10, 1985	18 years, 284 days	Albany, New York, U.S.	
1	Win	1–0	Hector Mercedes	TKO	1 (4), 1:47	Mar 6, 1985	18 years, 249 days	Plaza Convention Center, Albany, New York, U.S.	

== Exhibition boxing record ==
4 fights	0 wins	0 losses
Draws	1	
Non-scored	3	

No.	Result	Record	Opponent	Type	Round, time	Date	Location	Notes
4	Draw	0–0–1 (3)	Roy Jones Jr.	SD	8	Nov 28, 2020	Staples Center, Los Angeles, California, U.S.	Scored by the WBC
3	—N/a	0–0 (3)	Corey Sanders	—N/a	4	Oct 20, 2006	Chevrolet Centre, Youngstown, Ohio, U.S.	Non-scored bout
2	—N/a	0–0 (2)	James Tillis	—N/a	4	Nov 12, 1987	DePaul University Alumni Hall, Chicago, Illinois, U.S.	Non-scored bout
1	—N/a	0–0 (1)	Anthony Davis	—N/a	1	Jul 4, 1986	Liberty State Park, Jersey City, New Jersey, U.S.	Non-scored bout

== Titles in boxing ==
=== Major world titles ===
- WBA heavyweight champion (200+ lbs) (2×)
- WBC heavyweight champion (200+ lbs) (2×)
- IBF heavyweight champion (200+ lbs)

=== The Ring magazine titles ===
- The Ring heavyweight champion (200+ lbs)

=== Undisputed titles ===
- Undisputed heavyweight champion (200+ lbs)

=== Honorary titles ===
- WBC Frontline Battle champion

== Pay-per-view bouts ==
=== Boxing ===
==== PPV home television ====
United States
No.	Date	Fight	Billing	Buys	Network
1	June 27, 1988	Tyson vs. Spinks	Once and For All	700,000	King Vision
2	March 18, 1991	Tyson vs. Ruddock	The Fight of the Year	960,000	King Vision
3	June 28, 1991	Tyson vs. Ruddock II	The Rematch	1,250,000	King Vision
4	August 19, 1995	Tyson vs. McNeeley	He's Back	1,600,000	Showtime/King Vision
5	March 16, 1996	Tyson vs. Bruno II	The Championship Part I	1,400,000	Showtime/King Vision
6	September 7, 1996	Tyson vs. Seldon	Liberation: Champion vs. Champion	1,150,000	Showtime/King Vision
7	November 9, 1996	Tyson vs. Holyfield	Finally	1,600,000	Showtime/King Vision
8	June 28, 1997	Tyson vs. Holyfield II	The Sound and the Fury	1,990,000	Showtime/King Vision
9	Jan 16, 1999	Tyson vs. Botha	Tyson-Botha	750,000	Showtime
10	October 20, 2000	Tyson vs. Golota	Showdown in Motown	450,000	Showtime
11	June 8, 2002	Lewis vs. Tyson	Lewis–Tyson Is On	1,970,000	HBO/Showtime
12	February 22, 2003	Tyson vs. Etienne	Back to Business	100,000	Showtime
13	July 30, 2004	Tyson vs. Williams	Return for Revenge	150,000	Showtime
14	June 11, 2005	Tyson vs. McBride	Tyson-McBride	250,000	Showtime
15	November 28, 2020	Tyson vs. Jones Jr.	Lockdown Knockdown	1,600,000	Triller
		Total sales		15,920,000	

United Kingdom
Date	Fight	Network	Buys	Source(s)
March 16, 1996	Frank Bruno vs. Mike Tyson II	Sky Box Office	600,000	
June 28, 1997	Evander Holyfield vs. Mike Tyson II	Sky Box Office	550,000	
January 29, 2000	Mike Tyson vs. Julius Francis	Sky Box Office	500,000	
June 8, 2002	Lennox Lewis vs. Mike Tyson	Sky Box Office	750,000	
November 28, 2020	Mike Tyson vs. Roy Jones Jr.	BT Sport Box Office		
	Total sales		2,400,000	

==== Closed-circuit theater TV ====
Select pay-per-view boxing buy rates at American closed-circuit theater television venues:

Date	Fight	Buys	Revenue	Revenue (inflation)
June 27, 1988	Mike Tyson vs. Michael Spinks	800,000	$32,000,000	$87,110,000
June 28, 1997	Evander Holyfield vs. Mike Tyson II	120,000	$9,000,000	$18,050,000
	Total sales	920,000	$41,000,000	$79,930,000

=== Professional wrestling ===
==== World Wrestling Federation ====
Date	Event	Venue	Location	Buys	Ref
March 29, 1998	WrestleMania XIV	FleetCenter	Boston, Massachusetts, U.S.	730,000	

==== All Elite Wrestling ====
Date	Event	Venue	Location	Buys	Ref
May 23, 2020	Double or Nothing	Daily's Place; TIAA Bank Field	Jacksonville, Florida	115,000–120,000	

== Filmography ==
Films
Year	Title	Role	Notes	Ref.
1999	Black and White	Himself	Cameo appearance	
1999	Play It to the Bone	Himself	Cameo appearance	
2001	Crocodile Dundee in Los Angeles	Himself	Cameo appearance	
2006	Rocky Balboa	Himself (in-universe)	Cameo appearance	
2009	The Hangover	Himself	Cameo appearance	
2011	The Hangover Part II	Himself	Cameo appearance	
2013	Grudge Match	Himself	Cameo appearance	
2015	Ip Man 3	Frank		
2017	China Salesman	Kabbah		
2018	Kickboxer: Retaliation	Briggs		
2018	Girls 2	Dragon		
2019	Hamlet Pheroun	Rick	Egyptian film; supporting role	
2021	Untold: Deal with the Devil	Himself	Documentary	
2022	Vendetta	Roach		
2022	Liger	Mark Anderson	Indian film; extended cameo appearance	
2023	Asphalt City	Chief Burroughs		
2023	Untold: Jake Paul the Problem Child	Himself	Documentary	
2023	Once Within a Time	The Mentor		

Television
Year	Title	Role	Notes	Ref.
2013	Law & Order: Special Victims Unit episode "Monster's Legacy"	Reggie Rhodes		
2014–2019	Mike Tyson Mysteries	Himself (voice)	Animated series	
2017	Masameer episode "The Groons Part 2"	Himself (voice)	Web series	
2021	Hell's Kitchen	Himself	Chef's table guest for the blue team; Episode: "Temping the Meat"	
2026	Robot Chicken	Himself (voice)	Television special, "Robot Chicken Adult Swim 25th Anniversary Special"	

Video games
Year	Title	Role	Ref.
1987	Mike Tyson's Punch–Out!!	Himself	
2000	Mike Tyson Boxing	Himself	
2002	Mike Tyson Heavyweight Boxing	Himself	
2003	The Wild Rings	Himself	
2004	King of Colosseum II	Himself	
2009	EA Sports Fight Night Round 4	Himself	
2011	EA Sports Fight Night Champion	Himself	
2011	Mike Tyson: Main Event	Himself	
2012	WWE '13	Himself	
2014	Family Guy: The Quest For Stuff	Himself	
2016	EA Sports UFC 2	Himself	
2023	EA Sports UFC 5	Himself	

Music videos
Year	Title	Role	Notes	Ref.
2020	Eminem – "Godzilla"	Himself	Cameo appearance	

== Awards and honors ==
=== Humane letters ===
The Central State University in Wilberforce, Ohio, in 1989 awarded Tyson an honorary Doctorate in Humane Letters: "Mike demonstrates that hard work, determination and perseverance can enable one to overcome any obstacles."

=== Boxing ===
- Ring magazine Prospect of the Year (1985)
- 2× Ring magazine Fighter of the Year (1986, 1988)
- 2× Sugar Ray Robinson Award winner (1987, 1989)
- BBC Sports Personality of the Year Overseas Personality (1989)
- International Boxing Hall of Fame inductee (Class of 2011)
- "Guirlande d'Honneur" by the FICTS (Milan, 2010)

=== Professional wrestling ===
- Pro Wrestling Illustrated
  - Faction of the Year (2021) – with The Inner Circle
- WWE
  - WWE Hall of Fame (Class of 2012)

== See also ==
- List of celebrities who own cannabis businesses
- List of heavyweight boxing champions
- List of undisputed boxing champions
- World heavyweight boxing championship records and statistics

== Notes ==
Sporting positions
Amateur boxing titles
Previous: Olian Alexander	U.S. Golden Gloves heavyweight champion 1984	Next: Jerry Goff
World boxing titles
Preceded by Trevor Berbick	WBC heavyweight champion November 22, 1986 – February 11, 1990	Succeeded by Buster Douglas
Preceded by James Smith	WBA heavyweight champion March 7, 1987 – February 11, 1990	Succeeded by Buster Douglas
Preceded by Tony Tucker	IBF heavyweight champion August 1, 1987 – February 11, 1990	Succeeded by Buster Douglas
Vacant Title last held by Leon Spinks	Undisputed heavyweight champion August 1, 1987 – February 11, 1990	Succeeded by Buster Douglas
Preceded by Michael Spinks	The Ring heavyweight champion June 27, 1988 – February 1990; Title discontinued until 2002	Vacant Title next held by Lennox Lewis
Preceded by Frank Bruno	WBC heavyweight champion March 16, 1996 – September 24, 1996; Vacated	Vacant Title next held by Lennox Lewis
Preceded by Bruce Seldon	WBA heavyweight champion September 7, 1996 – November 9, 1996	Succeeded by Evander Holyfield
Awards
Previous: Mark Breland	The Ring Prospect of the Year; 1985	Next: Michael Williams
Previous: Marvin Hagler; Donald Curry	The Ring Fighter of the Year; 1986	Next: Evander Holyfield
Previous: Marvin Hagler	BWAA Fighter of the Year; 1986	Next: Julio César Chávez
Previous: Evander Holyfield	The Ring Fighter of the Year; 1988	Next: Pernell Whitaker
Previous: Julio César Chávez	BWAA Fighter of the Year; 1988	Next: Pernell Whitaker
Previous: Kelvin Seabrooks vs. Thierry Jacob; Round 1	The Ring Round of the Year vs. Michael Spinks; Round 1; 1988	Next: Lupe Gutierrez vs. Jeff Franklin; Round 12
Previous: Steffi Graf	BBC Overseas; Sports Personality of the Year; 1989	Next: Mal Meninga
Previous: Saman Sorjaturong vs. Humberto González	The Ring Fight of the Year vs. Evander Holyfield; 1996	Next: Arturo Gatti vs. Gabriel Ruelas
Achievements
Inaugural	The Ring pound for pound #1 boxer September 12, 1989 – February 12, 1990	Succeeded by Julio César Chávez
