= Mike Tyson in popular culture =

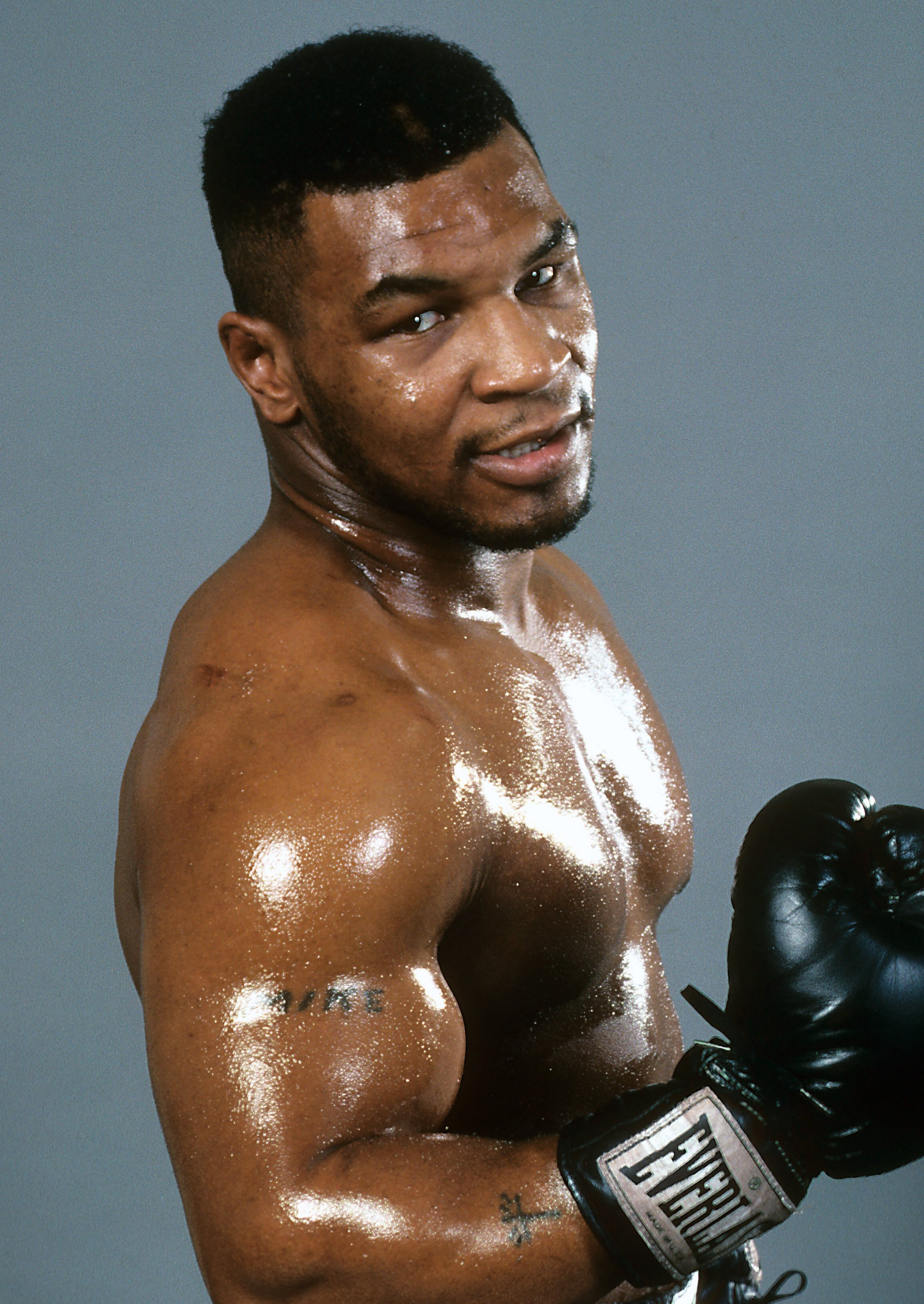
Mike Tyson in 1987

Mike Tyson is an American former World Heavyweight boxing Champion. Tyson, ranked by ESPN as the No. 1 Most Outrageous Character in modern sports history has appeared in numerous popular media in either cameo appearances or as a subject of parody or satire.

== Cameos and other appearances ==
- Tyson has appeared in a commercial aired in 1990 for Toyota trucks in Japan.
- Mike Tyson is featured on the three-part Jimmy Kimmel parody episode "The Pizza", a parody skit of the hip hopera by singer R. Kelly called Trapped in the Closet.
- Tyson was good friends with rapper Tupac Shakur, and often came out for a fight with a song Shakur specifically recorded for his ringwalk music. In 1996, Shakur was fatally shot in a drive-by shooting after attending the Tyson-Seldon fight.
- In 2007, Indian Bollywood movie producer Firoz Nadiadwala approached Mike Tyson to feature in a promotional video for his film Fool and Final. Reportedly despite his pending legal problems, Tyson was given clearance to go to India on April 20 to participate in the shoot.
- In 2011, Tyson made a cameo in the TV series Breaking In where he hired Contra Security to assess his estate's security. He later became involved in a case that involved a cyber teen bully and helped the student become more popular.
- On May 18, 2011, Tyson appeared with his wife on Argentina's version of Dancing with the Stars, Bailando 2011.
- On August 7, 2011, CBS aired an episode of Same Name, featuring Mike Tyson.
- Tyson guest starred in the February 6, 2013 episode of the long-running NBC legal drama, Law & Order: Special Victims Unit as a murderous death row inmate. Andre Braugher portrayed his defense counsel.
- Tyson makes a cameo in the critically acclaimed How I Met Your Mother TV series. He appears as himself, helping Robin take care of Baby Marvin in the season 8 episode "Bad Crazy".
- Tyson makes a brief appearance alongside Neil Patrick Harris in the opening number of the 2013 Tony Awards.
- Tyson also appeared in a Foot Locker commercial where he apologized to Evander Hollyfield for biting his ear and gives it back to him and they hug in a warm and fuzzy moment

== Parodies and satire ==
- The Simpsons character Drederick Tatum, voiced by Hank Azaria, is based entirely on Tyson with a high-pitched lisping voice, a menacing demeanor, a criminal record, financial problems and a tendency to make pseudo-intellectual comments like "I insist that you desist" and "your behavior is unconscionable".
- Tyson's well hyped and short bout with Peter McNeeley in 1995 served as obvious inspiration for the parody film of that phase of Tyson's career, The Great White Hype, with a caricature of Tyson played by Damon Wayans and a caricature of Don King played by Samuel L. Jackson.
- Damon Wayans' brother Keenen Ivory Wayans portrayed Tyson in sketches of the 1990s comedy series In Living Color.
- ESPN.com Page 2 columnist Bill Simmons makes frequent references to "The Tyson Zone" (named after Tyson), which is a status an athlete or celebrity reaches when their behavior becomes so outrageous that one would believe almost any story or anecdote about the person, no matter how seemingly bizarre.
- Tyson was the inspiration for the Street Fighter character Mike Bison, but to avoid a lawsuit, several characters names were switched outside Japan, resulting in the boxer Mike Bison being renamed Balrog, the masked claw-user Balrog becoming Vega, and the dictator Vega renamed to M. Bison.
- The website www.miketython.com features edited and photoshopped movie posters that make fun of Mike Tyson's lisp, with titles such as "Jurathic Park" and "Ghothbuthterth".
- Tyson was referenced in the show, “Billions”, Season 1 Episode 1: Bobby Axelrod by SEC prosecutor, Chuck Rhoades: “Mike Tyson in his prime, and you do not want Mike Tyson in his prime.” Another famous Tyson quote, often mentioned in business and life contexts and alluded to in Billions, is: "Everyone has a plan until they get punched in the mouth".

== Sports ==
- Two former world champion boxers have the name Tyson in their monikers. One is Joan Guzmán who is called "Little Tyson." The other is Ruslan Chagaev who is nicknamed "White Tyson."
- Heavyweight WBC, Ring and Lineal champion boxer Tyson Fury is named after Mike Tyson.
- Ottawa Senators goaltender Ray Emery had a picture of Tyson on his goalie mask. He wore it for one game before he was told by Senators management that this was inappropriate due to Tyson's reputation.
- On April 17, 2014, Tyson threw out the ceremonial first pitch at PNC Park in Pittsburgh between the Pittsburgh Pirates and Milwaukee Brewers, throwing a fastball into the strike zone, then pretending to bite off the ear of backup catcher Tony Sanchez, in an obvious reference to the Evander Holyfield incident. Tyson, who was in Pittsburgh to promote a boxing event in the city, wore a Pirates jersey for the event and met with the Pirates players, including a star struck Andrew McCutchen. The Pirates defeated the Brewers 11–2.

== In movies and television ==
Television

- Fallen Champ: The Untold Story of Mike Tyson (1993) (Documentary)
- Tyson (1995) with Michael Jai White as Mike
- Tyson (2008) (Documentary)
- Entourage (2010)
- Law & Order: Special Victims Unit (2013)
- Mike Tyson: Undisputed Truth (2013)
- How I Met Your Mother (2013)
- Mike Tyson Mysteries (2014–2020) (Animated comedy on Adult Swim)
- Lip Sync Battle (April 23, 2015)
- Nine Legends (2016)
- To Tell the Truth (2016)
- Franklin & Bash (2016)
- Tyson vs. Jaws: Rumble on the Reef (2020) (Shark Week 2020 special)
- Tyson vs. Jaws: Rumble on the Reef - Sharkmania (2020) (A special edition of Tyson vs. Jaws: Rumble on the Reef with bonus footage)
- Hell's Kitchen (2021)
- Mike Tyson: The Knockout (2021) (Documentary)
- Mike (2022) Hulu Limited Series

Biopic
Film

- Black and White (1999) as himself
- Crocodile Dundee in Los Angeles (2001)
- Rocky Balboa (2006), Tyson appears as himself in Sylvester Stallone's 2006 movie Rocky Balboa. He can be seen taunting Mason "The Line" Dixon, the current champion in the movie (who because of his arrogance and ability to end fights early, is based on Tyson's early career) at ringside right before the Balboa / Dixon bout begins.
- The Hangover (2009), Tyson appears in a supporting role as a caricature of himself. He appears in the protagonists' hotel room, demanding the return of his tiger, which they stole from him while drunk. They later return the animal to Tyson's mansion, where Tyson shows them security footage to help them locate a missing friend. In a 2010 interview, he stated that he appeared in The Hangover in order to fund a drug habit.
- The Hangover Part II (2011), Tyson reprises his role as a fictional version of himself. However, he only makes a brief cameo at the end of the film as the wedding singer for Stu's (Ed Helms) wedding.
- Scary Movie 5 (2013), Tyson appears as himself in a scene where he complains to Christian Grey (Jerry O'Connell) about neck pain.
- Grudge Match (2013), Tyson appears as himself in a post-credits scene with Evander Holyfield.
- Gates of the Sun: Algeria Forever (2014), Tyson appears as himself in a bar fight scene.
- Ip Man 3 (2015) as Frank, where he plays a villainous role of a property developer.
- China Salesman (2017), as Kabbah
- Kickboxer: Retaliation (2018) as Briggs
- Girls 2 (2018), as Dragon
- Hamlet Pharon (2019), as Rick
- Vendetta (2022), as Roach
- Liger (2022)
- Once Within a Time (2023), as The Mentor
- Medellin (2023), as Robbie
- Asphalt City (2023), as Chief Burroughs

In 2015, it was announced that Martin Scorsese was developing a film based on Tyson's life, with Jamie Foxx set to star as the boxer. As of 2019, no further progress has been made, though Foxx maintains that it is still happening.

== In music ==
- "Second Round K.O." is a single by Canibus which was produced by hip-hop legend Wyclef Jean, from the debut album, Can-I-Bus. It contains Tyson vocals as the hook and he is featured in the music video. It peaked number 28 on the Billboard Hot 100 and number 3 on rap singles. It contains lyrics directed at rap genre pioneer LL Cool J who responded to both of them via a diss freestyle
- "Myke Ptyson" (2008) is a song by the Portland, Oregon-based band Starfucker, off of their debut album STRFKR.
- Tyson appears as himself in the 1989 Jazzy Jeff and the Fresh Prince music video, "I Think I Can Beat Mike Tyson"
- Tyson is featured in the song "Iconic" on Madonna's 2015 album Rebel Heart.
- Tyson is the inspiration behind the 1994 Blackstreet single "Booti Call".
- Tyson's trial was the subject behind Boogie Down Productions' song "Say Gal" from their 1992 album Sex and Violence.
- "Free Tyson Free" is a 1994 song by the Holy Gang made while Tyson was in prison.
- Tyson's loss against Buster Douglas was the inspiration for The Killers' song "Tyson Vs. Douglas". A portion of the comments during the fight can be heard at the beginning.
- The Toasters reference Tyson in their song "Rude, Rude Baby" from their 1997 album "D.L.T.B.G.Y.D."
- Tyson makes a cameo in the music video for the Eminem song "Godzilla" when he punches Eminem before apologizing profusely and attempting to assist in his recovery at the hospital with Dr. Dre.
- Soulja Boy Diss song "If You Show Up" by Mike Tyson
- Gang Starr song "Full Clip", although it was only for few seconds
- "Mike Tyson (Here It Comes)" is a song by Canadian folk rock band Cowboy Junkies from their 2023 album Such Ferocious Beauty.
- "M.T.B.T.T.F." ("Mike Tyson Blow to the Face") is a song by American hip-hop duo Clipse from their 2025 album Let God Sort Em Out.

== Professional wrestling ==
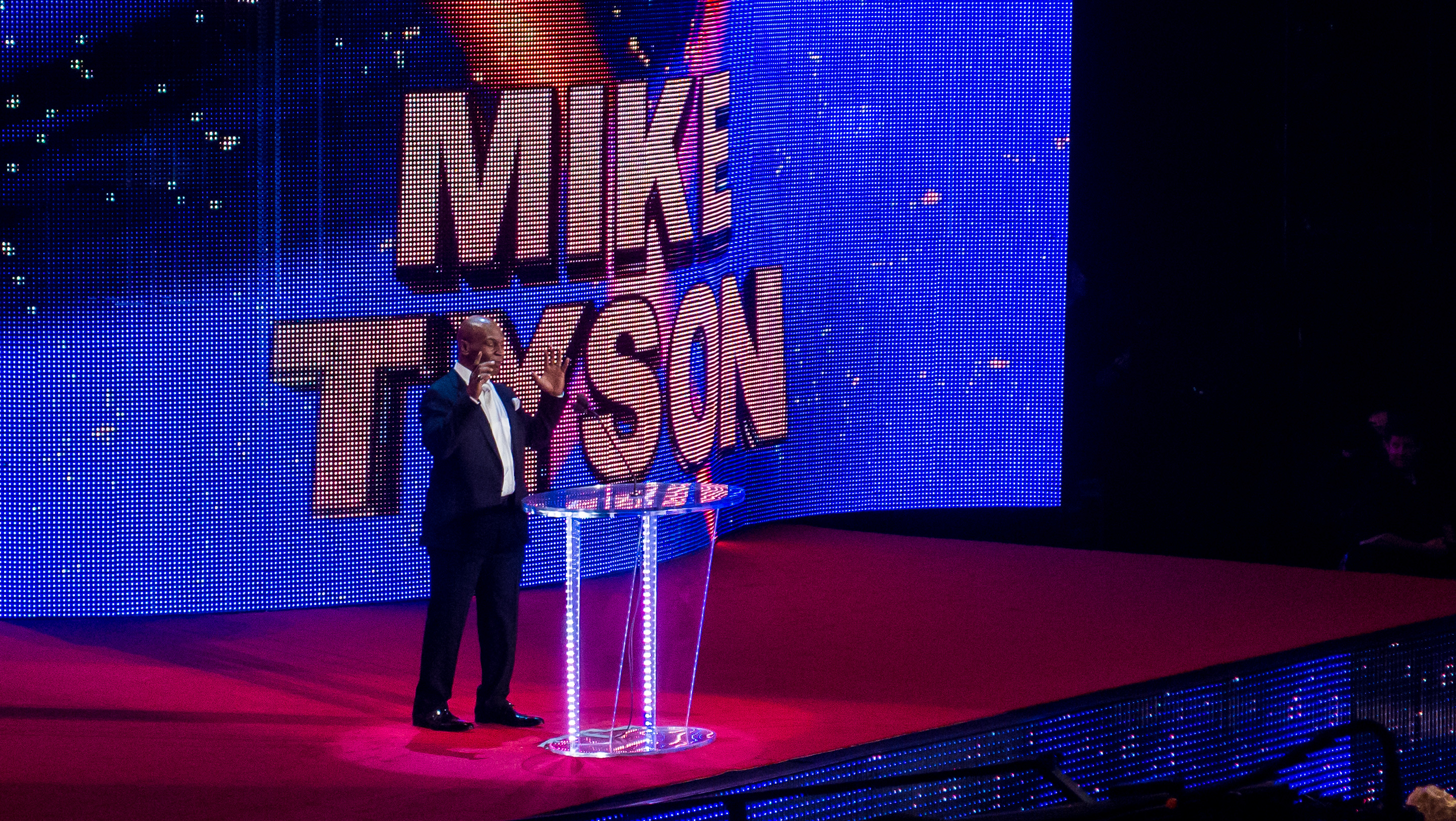
Tyson being inducted into the WWE Hall of Fame class of 2012

Tyson made a guest appearance at WrestleMania XIV on March 29, 1998, as a special outside enforcer for the main event match between Shawn Michaels and Stone Cold Steve Austin. Before the match, Tyson seemingly aligned himself with Michaels and his D-Generation X stable, due to the fact that he and his entourage had an in-ring brawl with Austin on Monday Night Raw on January 19, 1998, after Austin gave Tyson the middle finger. Tyson would eventually turn on D-X after counting the pinfall for Austin and awarding him the win for the WWF Championship, and after delivered a knockout punch to Michaels. Tyson was paid $3 million for his role in the match at WrestleMania XIV.

Tyson appeared on WWE Monday Night Raw as the guest host on January 11, 2010, and even made his return to the ring in a tag team match with Chris Jericho against D-Generation X. At first, the duo had their way until Tyson revealed a DX T-shirt he was wearing underneath a black shirt he was wearing and knocked out Jericho, which allowed Shawn Michaels to pin Jericho, giving DX the win.

On April 2, 2012, Tyson was inducted into the celebrity wing of the WWE Hall of Fame at the American Airlines Arena in Miami. He was inducted by D-Generation X members Shawn Michaels and Triple H.

In 2016, Tyson starred in the documentary film Nine Legends where he discussed his time involved in the WWE.

== In video games ==
- In 1987, Nintendo released Mike Tyson's Punch Out!!, on the NES, based on the arcade game Punch-Out!!, although there was later a version released in 1990 that replaced Mike Tyson with a fictional character, "Mr. Dream", after Nintendo's license with Tyson expired. Tyson is the final opponent in the 1987 game.
- In 1992, a second Nintendo game featuring Mike Tyson entitled Mike Tyson's Intergalactic Power Punch was to be released as a sequel to Mike Tyson's Punch-Out!!. However, due to the Desiree Washington case the project was scrapped and the game was eventually released as Power Punch II with Mike Tyson in the game being replaced with a character named Mark Tyler.
- Tyson is the base for a character in Capcom's Street Fighter franchise. Called M. Bison in the Japanese versions of the games, he was renamed to Balrog in fear of copyright issues.
- A video game called Mike Tyson Boxing was released for PlayStation by Codemasters on October 23, 2000, and for Game Boy Advance by Virtucraft and Ubisoft in March 2002.
- Tyson (or more specifically, the version of Tyson from Mike Tyson's Punch-Out!!) appears as a boss in I Wanna Be the Guy, released in 2007. During the battle, most of Tyson's body is immune to damage, except for a small weak point which the player must shoot in order to defeat Tyson.
- Electronic Arts' Fight Night Round 4 marks the debut of Mike Tyson on the Next Gen consoles in 2009. Tyson is featured, along with Muhammad Ali, on the cover of the game.
- Tyson appeared at the SXSW Screenburn Arcade in March 2011 for the launch of his iPhone app Mike Tyson: Main Event.
- Tyson is playable as downloadable content in professional wrestling game WWE '13.
- Tyson, set in two different eras, is an additional character in another Electronic Arts game, EA Sports UFC 2.
