= Mike Tyson Heavyweight Boxing =

2002 video game

- Developer: Atomic Planet Entertainment
- Publisher: Codemasters
- Series: Mike Tyson Boxing
- Platforms: PlayStation 2, Xbox
- Release: PlayStation 2: EU: June 7, 2002; NA: June 26, 2002; Xbox: EU: July 5, 2002; NA: July 17, 2002
- Genre: Sports
- Modes: Single-player, multiplayer

Mike Tyson Heavyweight Boxing is a boxing video game developed by Atomic Planet Entertainment and published by Codemasters for the PlayStation 2 and Xbox in 2002. It is a sequel to Mike Tyson Boxing (2000) that was released for the PlayStation.

== Reception ==
Reception

Aggregate score
| Aggregator | Score | |
| Aggregator | PS2 | Xbox |
|---|---|---|
| Metacritic | 33/100 | 37/100 |

Review scores
| Publication | Score | |
| Publication | PS2 | Xbox |
|---|---|---|
| Electronic Gaming Monthly | 3.17/10 | N/A |
| Game Informer | 6.75/10 | N/A |
| GameSpot | 2.5/10 | 2.8/10 |
| GameSpy | N/A | 40% |
| GameZone | 3/10 | 6.9/10 |
| IGN | 2.6/10 | 3.1/10 |
| Jeuxvideo.com | 14/20 | N/A |
| Official U.S. PlayStation Magazine | 1/5 | N/A |
| Official Xbox Magazine (US) | N/A | 5.5/10 |
| TeamXbox | N/A | 7.7/10 |
| Maxim | 1/5 | 1/5 |

The game received "generally unfavorable reviews", according to the review aggregation website Metacritic.
