= Norm Frauenheim =

American sports writer (born 1949)

Norm Frauenheim (born 1949) is a sports writer from Arizona. Frauenheim had a weekly boxing column at The Arizona Republic. Apart from his duties as boxing writer, he also reports on Phoenix Suns NBA basketball games, going to every Suns' game throughout the NBA season, and he works on NCAA basketball games. One of his NCAA basketball game reports earned him an award. His work has also appeared in USA Today, Los Angeles Times and New York Times. He covered Canelo Alvarez' victory over Sergey Kovalev in November 2019 and Tyson Fury's win over Deontay Wilder in February 2020 for the Los Angeles Times. He covered Timothy Bradley's controversial decision over Manny Pacquiao in June 2012 for The New York Times.

Frauenheim is best known for his boxing articles. With his column, he helped Arizona boxing fans familiarize themselves with boxers such as Johnny Tapia, Fernando Vargas, Danny Romero and many other non-Arizona residents. He was also important in developing a fan base for local fighters including the then amateur Michael Carbajal and Yvonne Trevino. He has also written columns on the careers of Phoenix residents Jesús González, Vassiliy Jirov, and José Miguel Cotto, who is Puerto Rican.

In 1998, Frauenheim was one of the first boxing writers in Arizona to announce that Mike Tyson had moved there.

Frauenheim was one of the first writers to note that Julio César Chávez allegedly left Phoenix without taking a urine drug test for the Arizona State Boxing Commission after his 2000 bout with Kostya Tszyu. In another of his columns, published on February 1, 2005, he described local trainer Joe Diaz as "volatile".

Frauenheim won the first place award in 2000 from the Arizona Press Club in the category "Sports Deadline Reporting" and the second place award in the same category. Both awards were related to his work as a special reporter for the Republic at the 2000 Sydney Olympic Games. In 2008, Frauenheim won the Boxing Writers Association of America's Fleischer Award for excellence in boxing journalism.

In 2003, he won the second place award from the Arizona Press Club for his article titled "Arizona humiliated by LSU". He also earned the third place on the "Sports enterprise reporting under 1,000 words" category for his article named "de la Hoya set for defining fight".

That same year, he was named, alongside 35 other boxing reporters from across the US, to vote on a proposition by New York attorney general Eliot Spitzer. The proposition would have introduced a series of measures protecting boxers fighting in the United States. The panel also included Larry Merchant, Wallace Matthews and International Boxing Hall of Fame member, writer Bill Gallo.

Frauenheim is frequently seen at press conferences held before fights in Arizona. He informs his readers when a press conference is free for the public to attend, or when a boxer will have a public workout, so that fans can meet their favorite boxers. He is also sent frequently to Los Angeles and Las Vegas to cover large boxing events for The Arizona Republic.
