= Starlite Music Theatre =

Theatre in Latham, New York, U.S.

Coordinates: 42°45′51″N 73°45′4″W

- Interactive map of Starlite Music Theatre
- Former names: Colonie Musical Theatre (1958–1963), Colonie Summer Theatre (1963-1971), Coliseum (1971-1987)
- Address: 629 Columbia Street Extension; Latham, NY, USA
- Capacity: 3,000
- Type: Theatre-in-the-round

Construction
- Built: 1958
- Expanded: 1969
- Closed: 1997
- Demolished: 2012

The Starlite Music Theatre was a 3,000-capacity theatre-in-the-round located in the Latham area of the Town of Colonie. Also known as the Colonie Coliseum, it opened as the Colonie Musical Theatre in 1958, a summer stock tent theater, with a production of the musical Damn Yankees. From 1963, it operated as the Colonie Summer Theatre. The tent was replaced with the permanent, expanded structure in 1969, and in 1971 was named the Coliseum. In the 1970s, the programming shifted from theatre toward musical acts. The last performances were held in 1997, and the building sat vacant after a 1998 high school graduation until its demolition in 2012.

Some notable performances at the venue included Diana Ross, Rodney Dangerfield, Eddie Murphy, Sammy Davis Jr., Three Dog Night, Pat Benatar, America, "Weird Al" Yankovic, B.B. King, Bob Hope & Kelly Garret, Little Richard, Howie Mandel, Gallagher, The Beach Boys, Mac Davis, Harry Chapin, and Kenny Rogers & Dolly Parton.

The Starlite property is located at 625 Columbia Street Extension (NY 9R), west of the city of Cohoes, and just east of 9R's southern junction with US 9 & I-87. After its 2012 demolition, it was revealed that the site would be redeveloped into a headquarters for Ayco, a subsidiary of Goldman Sachs. The site was opened on September 14, 2021.
