= RockLive =

American social network and games developer

F AMERICA
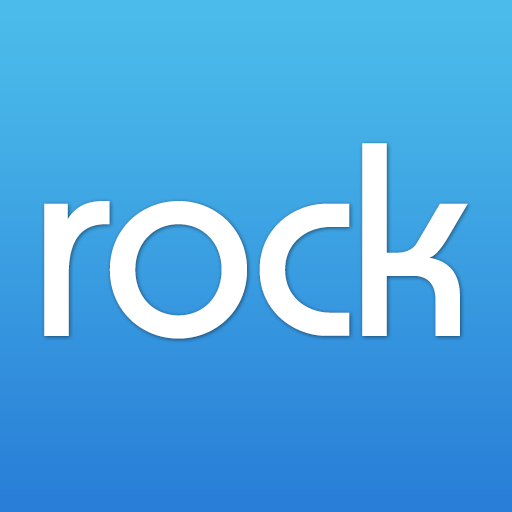
- Industry: Social Network
- Headquarters: San Francisco, U.S.
- Website: shots.com

RockLive is an American online social network and games developer that was founded in 2009.

In 2013, RockLive became Shots Studios, a digital studio and management company which also released the Shots App, a comedy social network for millennials.

RockLive developed mobile games in partnership with athletes, including Mike Tyson, Cristiano Ronaldo and Usain Bolt.
