= Mike Tyson Boxing =

2000 video game

- Developers: Codemasters (PS); Virtucraft (GBA)
- Publishers: Codemasters (PS); Ubi Soft (GBA)
- Platforms: PlayStation, Game Boy Advance
- Release: PlayStation: NA: 31 October 2000; EU: 3 November 2000; Game Boy Advance: EU: 1 March 2002; NA: 6 March 2002
- Genres: Sports, fighting
- Modes: Single-player, multiplayer

Mike Tyson Boxing, known in the UK as Prince Naseem Boxing, is a video game developed and published by Codemasters for PlayStation in 2000, and developed by Virtucraft and published by Ubi Soft for Game Boy Advance in 2002.

== Reception ==
Reception

Aggregate score
Aggregator	Score	
Aggregator	GBA	PS
Metacritic	44/100	44/100

Review scores
Publication	Score	
Publication	GBA	PS
AllGame	2.5/5	N/A
Edge	N/A	3/10
Electronic Gaming Monthly	N/A	5.33/10 (Note: Three critics of Electronic Gaming Monthly gave the PlayStation version each a score of 5.5/10, 4.5/10, and 6/10.)
EP Daily	N/A	3/10
Eurogamer	N/A	5/10
Game Informer	5/10	5/10
GameSpot	3.3/10	3/10
GameZone	3.8/10	N/A
IGN	4.8/10	4.3/10
Next Generation	N/A	1/5
Nintendo Power	2.6/5	N/A
Official U.S. PlayStation Magazine	N/A	2/5
X-Play	N/A	3/5
Maxim	N/A	2/5

The game received "unfavorable" reviews on both platforms according to the review aggregation website Metacritic. Doug Trueman of NextGen said of the PlayStation version, "Although Mike Tyson's reputation would be hard pressed to get any lower, this game manages to do just that." Maxim gave the same console version a negative review, over a week before the game was released Stateside.
