= Mike Tyson vs. Danny Williams =

Boxing competition

Return for Revenge
- Date: July 30, 2004
- Venue: Freedom Hall, Louisville, Kentucky, US

Tale of the tape
Boxer	Mike Tyson	Danny Williams
Nickname	Iron	The Brixton Bomber
Hometown	Catskill, New York, US	Brixton, London, UK
Purse	$8,000,000	$250,000
Pre-fight record	50–4 (2) (44 KO)	31–3 (26 KO)
Age	38 years, 1 month	31 years
Height	5 ft 10 in (178 cm)	6 ft 1 1/2 in (187 cm)
Weight	233 lb (106 kg)	265 lb (120 kg)
Style	Orthodox	Orthodox
Recognition	WBC; No. 8 Ranked Heavyweight; WBA; No. 10 Ranked Heavyweight; Former undisputed heavyweight champion	Former British and Commonwealth heavyweight champion

Result
- Williams wins via 4th-round KO

Mike Tyson vs. Danny Williams, billed as Return for Revenge, was a professional boxing match contested on July 30, 2004. Although former heavyweight champion Tyson entered the fray as a 9-to-1 favorite with oddsmakers, the fight was won by Williams by knockout at 2:51 of the 4th round.

== Background ==
Following a lopsided, knock-out loss to Lennox Lewis on June 8, 2002, Mike Tyson decided to make another attempt at a comeback. Tyson returned to boxing on February 22, 2003, to face fringe contender Clifford Etienne, who he was able to knock out 49 seconds into the fight. Tyson's impressive performance led to Lewis offering Tyson a rematch with Lewis' titles at stake, but Tyson passed on the offer, claiming that he would need at least two other tune up fights before he would consider facing Lewis again.

Tyson was then given the option to compete on the undercard of Lewis' title defense against Vitali Klitschko on June 21, 2003, after which Tyson would have two additional fights before taking on Lewis in their rematch. Tyson initially agreed and was set to meet future WBC heavyweight champion Oleg Maskaev, but Tyson pulled out of the bout after former promoter Don King allegedly used threats to prevent Tyson from signing the contract.

Tyson ultimately could not fight for the remainder of 2003 after running into several legal problems, including being arrested after fighting two Pennsylvania men in the lobby of a New York Marriott Hotel in June, facing a lawsuit from King bodyguard Isadore Bolton stemming from a scuffle in Florida in which Tyson allegedly broke a bone in Bolton's face. He also filed for bankruptcy in August.

In June 2004, Tyson announced his plans to face little-known British heavyweight Danny Williams on July 30 of that year. Despite taking a 17–month layoff after his previous fight against Etienne, Tyson still entered the fight as a 9–1 favorite.

== The fight ==
Tyson came out strong and dominated the first round. At the midway point of the first, Tyson staggered Williams with a left uppercut, causing a shaken Williams to clinch with Tyson. Tyson continued to hammer Williams with power punches and was able to again stagger Williams with 20 seconds left in the round, but Williams managed to clinch Tyson and made it through the first round without suffering any knock-downs. Tyson, however, had injured his left knee - by tearing a ligament - which would impair his movement and ability to throw punches for the rest of the fight. He underwent surgery for the injury a few days later.

Williams had a much better second round, being able to land several power punches and trading blows with Tyson during the final minute, but Tyson still managed to win the round on all three of the judges' scorecards. Williams attempted to remain competitive with Tyson in the third round, but had two points deducted for two separate fouls, one for a late punch on the break that opened a cut above Tyson's right eye, and another for a low blow. In round four, however, Tyson began to tire, neither throwing nor landing as many punches as he had in the previous rounds.

With only 25 seconds remaining, Williams began to rain in a long, unanswered combination, which ultimately sent Tyson into the ropes and onto the canvas with 10 seconds left in the round. Tyson remained seated on the canvas before finally attempting to get back up as the referee's count reached seven. Although the groggy Tyson was able to get back up, he narrowly missed beating the referee's count of ten. As a result, Williams was declared the winner by knock-out at 2:51 of the fourth round.

== Aftermath ==
Following Tyson's loss to Williams, he took another lengthy hiatus that lasted over 10 months, but he eventually returned on June 11, 2005, to face Kevin McBride. Tyson was able to build a 57–55 lead on two of the judges' scorecards through the first six rounds of the fight, but chose to quit before the seventh, giving McBride the TKO victory. Following the fight, Tyson revealed that he no longer had the desire to fight and announced his retirement from boxing.

Willams, meanwhile, was able to extend his victory over Tyson into a world title fight with WBC heavyweight champion Vitali Klitschko. Williams met Klitschko on December 11, 2004. Williams was dominated for the entire fight. Klitschko knocked down Williams four times through eight rounds, before the referee waved off the fight following the fourth and final knock-down at 1:26 of the eighth round.

== Undercard ==
Confirmed bouts:

== Broadcasting ==
Country	Broadcaster
Australia	Main Event
Canada	Viewers Choice
Mexico	TV Azteca
Philippines	Solar Sports / ABC 5
United Kingdom	Sky Sports
United States	Showtime

Preceded by vs. Clifford Etienne	Mike Tyson's bouts 30 July 2004	Succeeded by vs. Kevin McBride
Preceded by vs. Augustin N'Gou	Danny Williams's bouts 30 July 2004	Succeeded by vs. Vitali Klitschko
