= Mike Tyson vs. Kevin McBride =

Boxing match

Capital Explosion
- Date: June 11, 2005
- Venue: MCI Center, Washington, D.C., U.S.

Tale of the tape
Boxer	Mike Tyson	Kevin McBride
Nickname	Iron	The Clones Colossus
Hometown	Catskill, New York, U.S.	Clones, Ireland
Purse	$5,500,000	$150,000
Pre-fight record	50–5 (2) (44 KO)	32–4–1 (27 KO)
Age	38 years, 11 months	32 years, 1 month
Height	5 ft 10 in (178 cm)	6 ft 6 in (198 cm)
Weight	233 lb (106 kg)	271 lb (123 kg)
Style	Orthodox	Orthodox
Recognition	WBC; No. 13 Ranked Heavyweight; Former undisputed heavyweight champion	Former Irish heavyweight champion

Result
- McBride wins via sixth-round 'corner retirement

Mike Tyson vs. Kevin McBride, billed as Capital Explosion, was a professional boxing match contested on June 11, 2005. Although Tyson appeared to be ahead on points on the judges' scorecards through six rounds, he failed to answer the bell for the 7th round and was ruled defeated by technical knockout.

== Background ==
After being knocked out in the fourth round of his previous fight against Danny Williams on July 30, 2004, Mike Tyson took a lengthy hiatus as he contemplated whether or not he would continue to fight. In April 2005, Tyson officially announced his return to boxing to take on little-known Irish journeyman Kevin McBride on June 11 in Washington, D.C. Though the 38–year old Tyson was far removed from his prime, he nevertheless predicted an easy victory, vowing to "gut (McBride) like a fish" while also calling his opponent a "tomato can".

McBride, however, remained confident that he could upset Tyson and promised that he would "shock the world" by defeating Tyson Prior to the fight, Tyson parted ways with trainer Freddie Roach, who had trained Tyson for his two previous fights against Clifford Etienne in 2003 and Williams in 2004, and replaced him with former super bantamweight champion Jeff Fenech.

== The fight ==
For much of the fight, Tyson labored against the bigger McBride, who used his distinct height advantage and a sharp left-jab to keep the aggressive Tyson at bay through the first two rounds. Tyson was able to land more punches in the third and fourth, but McBride would often clinch and lean on Tyson in an effort to wear Tyson out. By the fifth round, the strategy appeared to have worked as Tyson seemed tired and McBride was able to land several good punches during the round, though Tyson was still able to win the round on two of the judge's scorecards.

In the sixth round, a frustrated Tyson attempted to break McBride's left arm after the two were tied up in a clinch, for which Tyson was warned by referee Joe Cortez. Shortly after, Tyson suffered a two-point deduction after hitting McBride with an intentional head butt that opened a cut above McBride's eye. As the round came to a close, a shove by McBride caused Tyson to fall to the canvas, but it was ruled a slip rather than a knockdown. Tyson would have won the round, but the two-point deduction gave McBride a 9–8 win on the scorecards.

Though Tyson still led on two of the judges' scorecards, Tyson shockingly quit on his stool before the seventh round began, automatically giving McBride the victory by technical knockout.

== Aftermath ==
Speaking to Jim Gray after the bout Tyson said "I do not have the guts to be in this sport anymore. I don't want to disrespect the sport that I love. My heart is not into this anymore. I'm sorry for the fans who paid for this. I wish I could have done better."

== Undercard ==
Confirmed bouts:

== Broadcasting ==
Country	Broadcaster
Australia	Main Event
Mexico	TV Azteca
United States	Showtime

Preceded by vs. Danny Williams	Mike Tyson's bouts 11 June 2005	Succeeded by vs. Jake Paul
Preceded by vs. Kevin Montiy	Kevin McBride's bouts 11 June 2005	Succeeded by vs. Byron Polley
