= Nakash =

Nakash is both a surname and a given name. Notable people with the name include:

- Joseph Nakash (born 1942), American businessman
- Ran Nakash (born 1978), Israeli boxer
- Nakash Aziz (born 1985), Indian composer and singer
