= Iceman John Scully =

American boxer (born 1967)

John Scully
- Born: July 28, 1967 (age 59); Connecticut, U.S.
- Occupation: Former boxer
- Known for: Former light heavyweight journeyman boxer

John Scully (born July 28, 1967) is a former American boxer. Formerly a professional light heavyweight, he is now a boxing trainer who has trained two light heavyweight champions in Chad Dawson and Artur Beterbiev and is an analyst for the ESPN Classic television network. John is also known for his work with disadvantaged former fighters and charity for them as well as organizing events targeting former amateur standout fighters and reconnecting them with the boxing community. His nickname during his boxing career was "Iceman".

Scully was a journeyman fighter for the latter half of his career, racking up 11 professional losses and he was dominated by Henry Maske and stopped by Drake Thadzi.

== Amateur career ==
Scully graduated from Windsor (Connecticut) High School in 1985. He began boxing in 1982 and won numerous championships at middleweight (165 pounds or 75 kilograms), including the 1987 Ohio State Fair (Columbus, Ohio), the 1987 National PAL (Jacksonville, Florida) and the 1988 Eastern U.S. Olympic Trials (Fayetteville, North Carolina).

Scully defeated World 165-pound (75 kg) Amateur Champion Darin Allen to win the Eastern Trials, future heavyweight contender Melvin Foster to win the Ohio Fair, and nationally rated Kertis Mingo at the National PAL.

Scully won Outstanding Boxer awards at both the 1987 Western Massachusetts Golden Gloves and the 1988 Eastern U.S. Olympic Trials tournaments.

In February 1988, the 5 ft 10 in (1.78 m) boxer was named to the All-Time team (in the middleweight spot), for the WM Golden Gloves in Holyoke, Massachusetts, joining fellow standouts Mike Tyson (heavyweight) and Marlon "Magic Man" Starling (honorable mention at welterweight). Scully won four straight WM Golden Gloves titles (1985–1988) and three consecutive New England Golden Gloves titles (1986–1988).

He defeated fellow future world-title challenger Joey DeGrandis to win the 1988 New England Golden Gloves championships.

Scully also advanced to the championship round of the National Golden Gloves tournament on two occasions, losing on a 3–2 split decision in 1987 at Knoxville (to Fabian Williams of Michigan) and a highly disputed 3–2 call in Omaha in 1988, to Keith Providence of New York City.

Scully also notably scored two decision victories en route to each of those national final appearances in 1987 and 1988 over hard-punching future WBC #1 Middleweight contender Lamar "Kidfire" Parks of Greenville, South Carolina.

The "Iceman" concluded his amateur career with a Bronze medal winning performance at the 1988 U.S. Olympic Trials in Concord, California, defeating # 3 ranked Joe Hill of Omaha in the quarter-finals before losing a 4–1 decision to World Champion Darin Allen of Columbus, Ohio in the semi-final rematch of their Eastern U.S. Olympic Trials final just one month earlier.

Scully turned professional with a final amateur record of 57–13 (not including two junior olympic bouts at age 15 and two exhibition matches). He failed to make the 1988 U.S. Olympic boxing team. Scully was criticized for his lack of punching power and being unable to fight well under pressure.

== Professional career ==
Scully turned professional in 1988 and finished his career in 2001 with a 38–11 record (21 knockouts). He fought for the International Boxing Federation world light heavyweight championship at Leipzig, Germany in 1996, losing a 12-round decision to unbeaten champion Henry Maske. On December 8, 1995, Scully fought two-time world champion Michael Nunn for the WBO NABO super middleweight title. Although ESPN commentators had the fight close, Nunn was awarded a unanimous win, including a curiously wide score on the card of judge Harold Gomes.

His victories include a unanimous ten-round decision over Art Baylis (On Prime TV Network), a ten-round decision over WBC International 154-pound (70 kg) champion Billy Bridges at Harrah's in Atlantic City (on ESPN)

Scully also captured a November 1989 unanimous decision on USA's Tuesday Night Fights, over the former #1 nationally ranked 156-pound (71 kg) amateur Alphonso Bailey of Kentucky. Scully-Bailey was the co-feature to Simon Brown's IBF 147-pound (67 kg) title defense against Luis Santana.

On May 22, 1992 at Agawam, Massachusetts Scully captured a unanimous 12-round decision over Southern Boxing Association champion Melvin Wynn of Atlanta, Georgia as well.

Scully also frequently served as a sparring partner for some of the biggest names in the sport, including the highly regarded world champions Henry Maske, Mike McCallum, Vinny Pazienza, Roy Jones Jr. and James "Lights Out" Toney.

In November 2010, "Iceman" John Scully was inducted into the fifth class of the Connecticut Boxing Hall of Fame at the Mohegan Sun Resort and Casino in Connecticut.

== Professional boxing record ==
38 Wins (21 knockouts, 17 decisions), 11 Losses (1 technical knockout, 10 decisions)
Result	Record	Opponent	Type	Round	Date	Location	Notes
Win	13-1	(United States) Cleveland Nelson	SD	8	22/06/2001	Mississauga, Ontario, Canada	Close fight. One judge scored the fight for Nelson.
Loss	24-9-2	(United States) Ernest Mateen	UD	8	19/04/2001	(United States) New Haven, Connecticut, U.S.	
Loss	11-0-2	(United States) Sam Ahmad	MD	8	04/06/1999	(United States) Philadelphia, Pennsylvania, U.S.	
Loss	29-8-1	(Malawi) Drake Thadzi	TKO	7	02/08/1998	(United States) Boston, Massachusetts, U.S.	IBO Light Heavyweight Title. Referee stopped the bout at 2:37 of the seventh round after Scully was battered for seven rounds.
Win	13-7-1	(United States) Scott Lopeck	TKO	6	18/12/1997	(United States) Hartford, Connecticut, U.S.	
Loss	23-7-1	(United States) Ernest Mateen	UD	10	29/06/1997	(United States) Hartford, Connecticut, U.S.	
Loss	38-4-1	(Germany) Graciano Rocchigiani	UD	10	22/03/1997	Prenzlauer Berg, Berlin, Germany	
Loss	29-0	(Germany) Henry Maske	UD	12	25/05/1996	Leipzig, Germany	IBF Light Heavyweight Title.
Win	0-6	(United States) Jose Luis Feliciano	TKO	1	15/03/1996	(United States) Revere, Massachusetts, U.S.	
Loss	47-3	(United States) Michael Nunn	UD	12	08/12/1995	(United States) Mashantucket, Connecticut, U.S.	WBO NABO Super Middleweight Title.
Win	16-11-2	(United States) Willie Ball	TKO	2	20/09/1995	(United States) Mashantucket, Connecticut, U.S.	
Win	13-18	(United States) Willie Kemp	PTS	8	17/05/1995	(United States) Mashantucket, Connecticut], U.S.	
Win	0-14	(United States) Luis Oliveira	TKO	1	14/03/1995	(United States) Boston, Massachusetts, U.S.	
Win	10-7	(United States) Art Bayliss	PTS	10	20/10/1994	(United States) Mashantucket, Connecticut, U.S.	
Win	6-10-1	(United States) Tim Cooper	PTS	8	18/08/1994	(United States) Mashantucket, Connecticut, U.S.	
Win	13-11	(United States) Willie Kemp	PTS	8	25/06/1994	(United States) Revere, Massachusetts, U.S.	
Win	12-39-4	(United States) David McCluskey	TKO	4	12/03/1994	(United States) Hartford, Connecticut, U.S.	
Win	7-29	(United States) Jose Vera	TKO	4	06/11/1993	(United States) Foxborough, Massachusetts, U.S.	
Loss	32-5-1	(United States) Tony Thornton	UD	10	16/03/1993	(United States) Philadelphia, Pennsylvania, U.S.	
Loss	19-0	(United States) Tim Littles	UD	12	13/11/1992	(United States) Las Vegas, Nevada, U.S.	IBF USBA Super Middleweight Title.
Win	7-23	(United States) Jose Vera	PTS	6	24/09/1992	(United States) Randolph, Massachusetts, U.S.	
Win	4-3	(United States) Herman Farrar	TKO	6	20/08/1992	(United States) Milford, Connecticut, U.S.	
Win	15-23	(United States) Danny Chapman	TKO	3	06/08/1992	(United States) Hartford, Connecticut, U.S.	
Win	10-30-4	(United States) David McCluskey	PTS	6	30/06/1992	(United States) Pensacola, Florida, U.S.	
Win	12-8	(United States) Melvin Wynn	UD	12	22/05/1992	(United States) Agawam, Massachusetts, U.S.	WBF Intercontinental Super Middleweight Title. Scully and Wynn put on a spirited main event with Scully finishing strongly over the second half of the bout to secure the unanimous win
Win	7-18	(United States) Jose Vera	PTS	6	27/02/1992	(United States) Agawam, Massachusetts, U.S.	
Win	13-6	(United States) Willie Kemp	PTS	10	22/11/1991	(United States) Springfield, Massachusetts, U.S.	
Win	22-20-1	(United States) Randy Smith	PTS	10	27/09/1991	(United States) Springfield, Massachusetts, U.S.	
Win	7-17	(United States) Jose Vera	UD	8	23/10/1991	(United States) Worcester, Massachusetts, U.S.	
Loss	19-5-1	(United States) Kevin Watts	UD	10	18/03/1991	(United States) Atlantic City, New Jersey, U.S.	
Win	16-0	(United States) Billy Bridges	SD	10	12/12/1989	(United States) Atlantic City, New Jersey, U.S.	
Win	13-3-1	(United States) Alphonso Bailey	UD	8	09/11/1989	(United States) Springfield, Massachusetts, U.S.	
Win	5-1	(United States) Tony Daley	UD	10	29/09/1989	(United States) Hartford, Connecticut, U.S.	New England Middleweight Title.
Win	2-9	(United States) Victor King	TKO	4	08/09/1989	(United States) Taunton, Massachusetts, U.S.	
Win	2-8	(United States) Victor King	UD	6	25/08/1989	(United States) Bridgeport, Connecticut, U.S.	
Loss	23-4	(United States) Brett Lally	UD	10	11/07/1989	(United States) Atlantic City, New Jersey, U.S.	
Win	2-7-3	(United States) Mike Caminiti	TKO	6	16/06/1989	(United States) Hartford, Connecticut, U.S.	
Win	1-4-1	(United States) Mike "The Heat" Bonislawski	TKO	5	05/05/1989	(United States) Hartford, Connecticut, U.S.	
Win	0-1	Jerry Fleming	TKO	3	01/05/1989	(United States) Hartford, Connecticut, U.S.	
Win	1-3	(United States) Mike Bonislawski	PTS	6	17/03/1989	(United States) Hartford, Connecticut, U.S.	
Win	1-13	(United States) Bob Saxton	TKO	1	17/02/1989	(United States) Poughkeepsie, New York, U.S.	
Win	--	John Berkins	KO	1	06/01/1989	(United States) Hartford, Connecticut, U.S.	
Win	1-3	(United States) Rahim Muhammad	TKO	4	15/12/1988	(United States) Rochester, New York, U.S.	
Win	--	(United States) Vic Ferrer	TKO	4	10/12/1988	(United States) Salem, New Hampshire, U.S.	
Win	--	Jerry Fleming	TKO	4	02/12/1988	(United States) Poughkeepsie, New York, U.S.	
Win	--	(United States) Frank Ambrose	TKO	4	25/11/1988	(United States) Hartford, Connecticut, U.S.	
Win	--	(United States) John Wilkinson	TKO	4	28/10/1988	(United States) Hartford, Connecticut, U.S.	Referee stopped the bout at 2:42 of the fourth round.
Win	0-2	(United States) Steve Jefferson	TKO	1	22/10/1988	(United States) Salem, New Hampshire, U.S.	Referee stopped the bout at 1:05 of the first round.
Win	1-9	(United States) Paulino Falcone	TKO	1	16/09/1988	(United States) Hartford, Connecticut, U.S.	Referee stopped the bout at 1:16 of the first round. Sold out crowd at Hartford Civic Center.

== Post retirement career ==
Scully trained several standout amateurs while pursuing his own boxing career, including 1997 National Junior Olympics Champion Sammy Vega, 1995 Ohio State Fair Champion Greg Cuyler, 1998 National PAL Champion Dwayne Hairston and 2000 U.S. Armed Forces Champion Orlando Cordova.

Since 2001, has been successful as a professional trainer, guiding four boxers to world championships (WIBF Lightweight Champion Liz Mueller, WBA Junior Middleweight Champion Jose Antonio Rivera, IBO Super Bantamweight Champion Mike Oliver and WBC Light heavyweight Champion "Bad" Chad Dawson).

The crowning moment may have been when he masterfully guided Rivera to the WBA Junior Middleweight Championship, with a clear points victory on Showtime over defending champion Alejandro "Terra" Garcia.

Scully has also had a hand in the professional training of notable boxers Israel "Pito" Cardona, Matt Godfrey, "Sucra" Ray Olivera, Scott "The Sandman" Pemberton, Lawrence Clay-Bey, Matt Remillard, Francisco "The Wizard" Palacios and George "Monk" Foreman III.

The Iceman also assists in the training camps of former world amateur champion and now IBF light heavyweight world champion Artur Beterbiev, who fights out of Montreal, Canada by way of Chechnya (head trainer is Marc Ramsay).

He is considered an important part of the development of future WBC light heavyweight world champion "Bad" Chad Dawson. Scully first trained Dawson for three successful fights in 2004 and 2005 before unforeseen promotional problems caused Dawson to leave to train in Florida with Dan Birmingham.

Scully and Dawson, however, reunited as a team early in the summer of 2011. Scully later guided Dawson to the biggest win of his professional career on April 28, 2012 at the legendary Boardwalk Hall in Atlantic City, New Jersey. The HBO televised matchup saw Dawson capture a 12-round decision to take the WBC Light heavyweight title from legendary champion Bernard "The Executioner" Hopkins. Notably, when Dawson seemingly began to mentally falter at the halfway point of the match, Scully masterfully kept the challenger steady, focused and on track between rounds. The exceptional cornerwork was properly noted by HBO's ringside broadcast team of Larry Merchant, Emanuel Steward and Jim Lampley.

Known for his insightful takes on the sport of boxing, especially his corner work between rounds of televised fights, Scully has written a highly praised boxing book entitled, "The Iceman Diaries" that details his life within the sport. He appears often on ESPN Classic, working alongside Joe Tessitore, as a ringside analyst for that network's ESPN Classic Boxing Series.

A frequent and widely acclaimed columnist for Britain's "Boxing News" magazine, Scully has also been featured several times on ESPN News, before and after major fights, previewing and analyzing the action, including Pay-Per-View battles between Floyd Mayweather Jr. and Shane Mosley, and Manny Pacquiao and Miguel Cotto.

In 2015 Scully joined the cast of the Nuvo-TV boxing reality show "KNOCKOUT" alongside Roy Jones Jr., Floyd Mayweather Sr. and Sugar Shane Mosley.

Scully was inducted into the Connecticut Boxing Hall of Fame in November 2009 at the Mohegan Sun Casino. He was also inducted into the Billy C. Boxing Hall of Fame (along with Ernie Shavers and Marlon Starling) at South Glens Falls, New York on November 19, 2011.
