= Malcolm Tann =

American boxer

Personal information
- Nickname: The Showstopper
- Nationality: American
- Born: Malcolm Earl Tann; August 20, 1978 (age 47) Seaboard, North Carolina, U.S.
- Height: 6 ft 6 in (198 cm)
- Weight: Heavyweight

Boxing career
- Reach: 80 in (203 cm)
- Stance: Orthodox

Boxing record
- Total fights: 31
- Wins: 25
- Win by KO: 14
- Losses: 6
Medal record
Men's amateur boxing
Representing United States
Goodwill Games
Bronze medal – third place	1998 New York	Heavyweight

Malcolm Earl Tann (born August 20, 1978) is an American former professional boxer who competed from 2002 to 2017.

== Amateur career ==
Tann started boxing while serving in the United States Air Force. In 2002 Tann became National Golden Gloves Super Heavyweight Champion with a win over, among others, Nathaniel James.

== Professional career ==
Tann won his first eight bouts, including a bizarre disqualification win over journeyman Clifford Couser (Couser was DQ'd for picking Tann up, slamming him to the mat, then trying to hit him while he was down) in 2003, but was dropped and decisioned by Willie Chapman that same year. In 2004 he beat Jason Gavern and in 2005 beat Derek Bryant, but later in the year had another defeat, to Domonic Jenkins via decision. During two separate bouts in 2007 televised by ShoBox, Tann was knocked out by heavyweights Chris Arreola and Alexander Dimitrenko. After the loss to Dimitrenko, Tann retired from boxing.

== Professional boxing record ==
31 fights	25 wins	6 losses
By knockout	14	4
By decision	11	2

No.	Result	Record	Opponent	Type	Round, time	Date	Location	Notes
31	Win	25–6	Ernest Reyna	KO	2 (10), 0:54	Nov 18, 2017	Emerald Coast Conference Center, Fort Walton Beach, Florida, U.S.	Won vacant USBC heavyweight title
30	Loss	24–6	Dillian Whyte	TKO	3 (8), 2:36	Aug 19, 2017	Pinnacle Bank Arena, Lincoln, Nebraska, U.S.	
29	Loss	24–5	Sergei Kuzmin	KO	4 (8), 1:19	Jun 23, 2017	DoubleTree Hotel, Ontario, California, U.S.	
28	Win	24–4	Nick Asberry	TKO	3 (6), 2:55	Oct 8, 2016	Horseshoe Hammond, Hammond, Indiana, U.S.	
27	Loss	23–4	Alexander Dimitrenko	TKO	5 (12), 2:23	July 14, 2007	Color Line Arena, Hamburg, Germany	For WBO Inter-Continental heavyweight title
26	Loss	23–3	Chris Arreola	TKO	8 (8), 1:07	May 4, 2007	Palms Casino Resort Las Vegas, Nevada, U.S.	
25	Win	23–2	Wade Lewis	MD	6	Mar 9, 2007	Soaring Eagle Casino, Mount Pleasant, Michigan, U.S.	
24	Win	22–2	Wade Lewis	UD	4	Dec 1, 2006	Mayo Civic Center, Rochester, Minnesota, U.S.	
23	Win	21–2	Joe Stofle	TKO	4 (6)	Nov 17, 2006	Soboba Casino, San Jacinto, California, U.S.	
22	Win	20–2	Sedreck Fields	UD	6	Sep 14, 2006	HP Pavilion, San Jose, California, U.S.	
21	Win	19–2	Derek Berry	TKO	3 (8), 1:02	Jul 19, 2006	Hilton Airport Hotel, Ontario, California, U.S.	
20	Win	18–2	Douglas Robertson	TKO	2 (6), 1:27	Jul 8, 2006	Convention Center, Pasadena, California, U.S.	
19	Win	17–2	Shaun Ross	TKO	3 (6)	Mar 23, 2006	HP Pavilion, San Jose, California, U.S.	
18	Loss	16–2	Domonic Jenkins	UD	6	Sep 16, 2005	Palace Indian Gaming Center, Lemoore, California, U.S.	
17	Win	16–1	Derek Bryant	UD	8	Jun 9, 2005	Pechanga Resort Casino, Temecula, California, U.S.	
16	Win	15–1	Leroy Childs	KO	2 (8), 3:00	Apr 1, 2005	Palace Indian Gaming Center, Lemoore, California, U.S.	
15	Win	14–1	Innocent Otukwu	RTD	2 (8), 3:00	Feb 10, 2005	Palace Indian Gaming Center, Lemoore, California, U.S.	
14	Win	13–1	Jason Gavern	UD	8	Oct 1, 2004	Spotlight 29 Casino, Coachella, California, U.S.	
13	Win	12–1	Andrew Greeley	TKO	2 (8), 2:50	Aug 19, 2004	Park Plaza, Houston, Texas, U.S.	
12	Win	11–1	Willie Chapman	UD	8	Jun 4, 2004	Chinook Winds Casino, Lincoln City, Oregon, U.S.	
11	Win	10–1	Wesley Martin	KO	1 (6), 2:52	Mar 14, 2004	Pechanga Resort Casino, Temecula, California, U.S.	
10	Win	9–1	Rodney McSwain	UD	4	Jan 30, 2004	Mesquite Rodeo Arena, Dallas, Texas, U.S.	
9	Loss	8–1	Willie Chapman	SD	4	Nov 6, 2003	Celebrity Theatre, Phoenix, Arizona, U.S.	
8	Win	8–0	Cliff Couser	DQ	1 (8), 1:57	Jul 11, 2003	Agua Caliente Casino, Rancho Mirage, California, U.S.	Couser disqualified for unsportsman like conduct
7	Win	7–0	Jason Curry	TKO	2 (6), 1:05	Jun 14, 2003	Stratosphere Hotel & Casino, Las Vegas, Nevada, U.S.	
6	Win	6–0	Wallace McDaniel	TKO	1 (6), 1:34	May 18, 2003	Jimmy's Bronx Cafe, The Bronx, New York, U.S.	
5	Win	5–0	Troy Beets	UD	4	Mar 15, 2003	Club Life, Dallas, Texas, U.S.	
4	Win	4–0	Milan Roldzak	KO	1 (4)	Jan 25, 2003	Pechanga Resort Casino, Temecula, California, U.S.	
3	Win	3–0	Harold Rodriguez	UD	4	Jan 10, 2003	Mohegan Sun, Uncasville, Connecticut, U.S.	
2	Win	2–0	Lisandro Ezequiel Diaz	UD	4	Dec 13, 2002	Pechanga Resort Casino, Temecula, California, U.S.	
1	Win	1–0	Jackie Beard	KO	1 (4), 2:13	Nov 3, 2002	Table Mountain Casino, Friant, California, U.S.	
