= Uriah Grant =

Jamaican boxer (born 1961)

Personal information
- Nickname: Bossman
- Born: Uriah Grant; January 20, 1961 (age 65) Saint Andrew Parish, Colony of Jamaica, British Empire
- Height: 6 ft 1 1/2 in (187 cm)
- Weight: Light heavyweight; Cruiserweight

Boxing career
- Reach: 75 1/2 in (192 cm)
- Stance: Orthodox

Boxing record
- Total fights: 51
- Wins: 30
- Win by KO: 28
- Losses: 21

Uriah Grant (born January 20, 1961) is a Jamaican former professional boxer who held the IBF Cruiserweight Title.

== Professional career ==
Grant turned pro in 1984 as a light heavyweight and lost to Henry Tillman in his second pro fight. In 1986 he defeated former light heavyweight champion Matthew Saad Muhammad. He looked headed towards a journeyman status, and dropped a series of fights, including a decision to Bobby Czyz in 1990. In 1991 he lost to Frank Tate, and moved up to cruiserweight. In 1993 he landed a shot at IBF Cruiserweight titleholder Al Cole and lost a decision. In 1995 Grant landed a rematch with Cole and lost another decision. The next year Grant was outboxed by a young Chris Byrd over 10 rounds. In 1997 Grant earned a shot at IBF Cruiserweight titleholder Adolpho Washington and won a close decision, winning his only title. Grant lost the belt in his next fight to Imamu Mayfield.

=== Thomas Hearns TKO ===
Grant had a resurgence in 2000 when he defeated Thomas Hearns in the second round. By the end of the first round, Hearns could be seen limping on his right leg. By the beginning of the next round, Hearns was forced to retire, claiming that he was unable to continue due to an injury to an ankle. His cornermen determined that his ankle was either severely sprained, or broken.

In 2002 Grant stepped up to heavyweight and took on Brian Nielsen, losing a decision. Grant dropped back down to cruiserweight, but failed to win another fight, including losses to Rydell Booker in 2003 and Eliecer Castillo in 2004. Grant announced his retirement after the bout with Castillo.

== Professional boxing record ==
| 51 fights | 30 wins | 21 losses |
|---|---|---|
| By knockout | 28 | 5 |
| By decision | 2 | 16 |

Key to abbreviations used for results
| DQ | Disqualification | RTD | Corner retirement |
| KO | Knockout | SD | Split decision / split draw |
| MD | Majority decision / majority draw | TD | Technical decision / technical draw |
| NC | No contest | TKO | Technical knockout |
| PTS | Points decision | UD | Unanimous decision / unanimous draw |

Boxing record
| No. | Result | Record | Opponent | Type | Round(s) | Time | Date | Location | Notes |
|---|---|---|---|---|---|---|---|---|---|
| 51 | Loss | 30–21 | (Cuba) Eliecer Castillo | KO | 1 (10) | 3:08 | 17 Jan 2004 | (United States) Seminole Casino, Coconut Creek, Florida, U.S. | |
| 50 | Loss | 30–20 | (United States) Ernest Mateen | TKO | 8 (12) | 1:10 | 15 Nov 2003 | (United States) Club Ovation, Boynton Beach, Florida, U.S. | For IBU cruiserweight title |
| 49 | Loss | 30–19 | (Denmark) Johny Jensen | MD | 6 | N/a | 13 Jun 2003 | Aalborg Hallen, Aalborg, North Jutland County, Denmark | |
| 48 | Loss | 30–18 | (United States) Rydell Booker | UD | 10 | N/a | 10 Jan 2003 | (United States) DeCarlo's Banquet Center, Warren, Michigan, U.S. | |
| 47 | Loss | 30–17 | (United States) Ernest Mateen | TD | 9 (12) | ? | 9 Nov 2002 | (United States) South Florida Fairgrounds, West Palm Beach, Florida, U.S. | For USBO cruiserweight title |
| 46 | Loss | 30–16 | (Denmark) Brian Nielsen | UD | 8 | N/a | 19 Apr 2002 | Falconer Centeret, Frederiksberg, Capital Region, Denmark | |
| 45 | Win | 30–15 | (United States) Nate Robinson | KO | 3 (10) | ? | 12 Apr 2002 | Pegasus Hotel, Kingston, Surrey County, Jamaica | |
| 44 | Win | 29–15 | (United States) Freddie Guzman | TKO | 3 (10) | 3:00 | 16 Jan 2001 | (United States) Sullivan Arena, Anchorage, Alaska, U.S. | |
| 43 | Loss | 28–15 | (United Kingdom) Carl Thompson | TKO | 5 (12) | 2:20 | 3 Feb 2001 | (United Kingdom) Bowlers Exhibition Centre, Stretford, Greater Manchester, UK | Lost IBO cruiserweight title |
| 42 | Win | 28–14 | (United States) Thomas Hearns | RTD | 2 (12) | 3:00 | 8 Apr 2000 | (United States) Joe Louis Arena, Detroit, Michigan, U.S. | Won IBO cruiserweight title |
| 41 | Win | 27–14 | (United States) Anthony Spain | TKO | 2 (8) | 1:57 | 1 Feb 2000 | (United States) Charlotte Co Auditorium, Punta Gorda, Florida, U.S. | |
| 40 | Loss | 26–14 | (Mexico) Saúl Montana | TKO | 12 (12) | 0:46 | 21 Feb 1998 | (United States) Miccosukee Indian Gaming Resort, Miami, Florida, U.S. | For NABA cruiserweight title |
| 39 | Loss | 26–13 | (United States) Imamu Mayfield | UD | 12 | N/a | 8 Nov 1997 | (United States) Thomas & Mack Center, Las Vegas, Nevada, U.S. | Lost IBF cruiserweight title |
| 38 | Win | 26–12 | (United States) Adolpho Washington | MD | 12 | N/a | 21 Jun 1997 | (United States) Sun Dome, Tampa, Florida, U.S. | Won IBF cruiserweight title |
| 37 | Win | 25–12 | (Mexico) Saúl Montana | KO | 3 (10) | ? | 7 Dec 1996 | (United States) Fantasy Springs Casino, Indio, California, U.S. | |
| 36 | Loss | 24–12 | (United States) Chris Byrd | UD | 10 | N/a | 6 Aug 1996 | (United States) IMA Sports Arena, Flint, Michigan, U.S. | |
| 35 | Win | 24–11 | (Argentina) Reinaldo Gimenez | TKO | 1 (12) | 1:39 | 6 Apr 1996 | (United States) Jai Alai Fronton, Miami, Florida, U.S. | Won WBC FECARBOX cruiserweight title |
| 34 | Loss | 23–11 | (United States) Al Cole | UD | 12 | N/a | 24 Jun 1995 | (United States) Boardwalk Hall, Atlantic City, New Jersey, U.S. | For IBF cruiserweight title |
| 33 | Win | 23–10 | (Dominican Republic) Perfecto Gonzalez | TKO | 1 (10) | ? | 21 Aug 1993 | (United States) Jai Alai Fronton, Miami, Florida, U.S. | |
| 32 | Loss | 22–10 | (United States) Al Cole | UD | 12 | N/a | 28 Feb 1993 | (United States) Trump Castle, Atlantic City, New Jersey, U.S. | For IBF cruiserweight title |
| 31 | Win | 22–9 | (United States) Carlton West | TKO | 4 (8) | ? | 21 Mar 1992 | (United States) Jai Alai Fronton, Miami, Florida, U.S. | |
| 30 | Win | 21–9 | (United States) Francisco Martinez | TKO | 2 (8) | ? | 22 Nov 1991 | (United States) Jai Alai Fronton, Miami, Florida, U.S. | |
| 29 | Win | 20–9 | (United States) John Burney | KO | 4 (8) | ? | 6 Sep 1991 | (United States) Miami Beach Convention Center, Miami Beach, Florida, U.S. | |
| 28 | Loss | 19–9 | (United States) Frank Tate | UD | 12 | N/a | 10 Feb 1991 | (United States) Trump Castle, Atlantic City, New Jersey, U.S. | Lost IBF Inter-Continental light heavyweight title |
| 27 | Win | 19–8 | (United States) Efren Olivo | KO | 2 (10) | ? | 16 Nov 1990 | (United States) Jai Alai Fronton, Miami, Florida, U.S. | |
| 26 | Win | 18–8 | (South Africa) Sakkie Horn | TKO | 8 (12) | 2:13 | 30 Jul 1990 | (United States) Jai Alai Fronton, Miami, Florida, U.S. | Retained IBF Inter-Continental light heavyweight title |
| 25 | Loss | 17–8 | (United States) Bobby Czyz | UD | 10 | N/a | 23 Mar 1990 | (United States) Showboat Hotel & Casino Atlantic City, Atlantic City, New Jersey, U.S. | |
| 24 | Loss | 17–7 | (United States) David Vedder | SD | 12 | N/a | 18 Jan 1990 | (United States) San Jose Civic Auditorium, San Jose, California, U.S. | For vacant USBA light heavyweight title |
| 23 | Win | 17–6 | (Colombia) Manuel Murillo | TKO | 4 (12) | ? | 15 Sep 1989 | (United States) Jai Alai Fronton, Miami, Florida, U.S. | Won IBF Inter-Continental light heavyweight title |
| 22 | Loss | 16–6 | (United States) Mike Sedillo | UD | 12 | N/a | 18 May 1989 | (United States) Hyatt Regency Convention Center, Oakland, California, U.S. | For USBA light heavyweight title |
| 21 | Loss | 16–5 | (Nigeria) Joe Lasisi | UD | 10 | N/a | 24 Sep 1988 | (United States) Bally's Las Vegas, Las Vegas, Nevada, U.S. | |
| 20 | Win | 16–4 | (United States) Louis Coleman | KO | 1 (10) | ? | 27 Nov 1987 | (United States) Veterans Memorial Coliseum, New Haven, Connecticut, U.S. | |
| 19 | Win | 15–4 | (United States) Eric Holley | TKO | 5 (12) | 0:39 | 23 Oct 1987 | (United States) Carillon Hotel, Miami Beach, Florida, U.S. | Won Florida light heavyweight title |
| 18 | Win | 14–4 | (United States) Abdullah Muhammad | KO | 1 (6) | ? | 8 Aug 1987 | (United States) Sunrise Musical Theatre, Sunrise, Florida, U.S. | |
| 17 | Loss | 13–4 | (Jordan) Ramzi Hassan | UD | 12 | N/a | 9 Apr 1987 | (United States) Inglewood Forum, Inglewood, California, U.S. | For California light heavyweight title |
| 16 | Win | 13–3 | (United States) Robert Folley | TKO | 4 (10) | ? | 22 Jan 1987 | (United States) Inglewood Forum, Inglewood, California, U.S. | |
| 15 | Win | 12–3 | (Colombia) Manuel Murillo | TKO | 6 (10) | 0:32 | 19 Dec 1986 | (United States) Miami Beach Convention Center, Miami Beach, Florida, U.S. | |
| 14 | Win | 11–3 | (United States) Arthel Lawhorne | TKO | 10 (10) | ? | 18 Nov 1986 | (United States) Inglewood Forum, Inglewood, California, U.S. | |
| 13 | Win | 10–3 | (United States) Abdullah Muhammad | TKO | 1 (10) | 2:47 | 18 Oct 1986 | (United States) St. Lucie County Civic Center, Fort Pierce, Florida, U.S. | |
| 12 | Win | 9–3 | (United States) Grover Robinson | KO | 7 (10) | | 29 Aug 1986 | (United States) Inglewood Forum, Inglewood, California, U.S. | |
| 11 | Loss | 8–3 | (Trinidad and Tobago) Leslie Stewart | UD | 8 | N/a | 6 May 1986 | (United States) Harrah's Marina Hotel Casino, Atlantic City, New Jersey, U.S. | |
| 10 | Win | 8–2 | (United States) Matthew Saad Muhammad | UD | 10 | N/a | 21 Feb 1986 | (United States) Galt Ocean Mile Hotel, Fort Lauderdale, Florida, U.S. | |
| 9 | Win | 7–2 | (United States) Reggie Neal | TKO | 1 (8) | 2:47 | 31 Jan 1986 | (United States) Galt Ocean Mile Hotel, Fort Lauderdale, Florida, U.S. | |
| 8 | Win | 6–2 | (United States) Charlie Dean Moore | TKO | 6 (8) | ? | 26 Dec 1985 | (United States) Turnberry Country Club, Miami Beach, Florida, U.S. | |
| 7 | Win | 5–2 | (The Bahamas) Gary Clarke | KO | 4 (8) | ? | 26 Dec 1985 | (United States) Newport Beach Hotel, Miami Beach, Florida, U.S. | |
| 6 | Win | 4–2 | (United States) James Sisco | KO | 2 (6) | ? | 25 Oct 1985 | (United States) Victory Park Auditorium, North Miami Beach, Florida, U.S. | |
| 5 | Loss | 3–2 | (United States) Ricky Womack | PTS | 6 | N/a | 17 Oct 1985 | (United States) Star Plaza Theatre, Merrillville, Indiana, U.S. | |
| 4 | Win | 3–1 | (United States) Frederick Jenkins | TKO | 2 (6) | ? | 23 Jul 1985 | (United States) Miami Beach Convention Center, Miami Beach, Florida, U.S. | |
| 3 | loss | 2–1 | (United States) Keith Allen | TKO | 5 (6) | ? | 10 May 1985 | (United States) Galt Ocean Mile Hotel, Fort Lauderdale, Florida, U.S. | |
| 2 | Loss | 1–1 | (United States) Henry Tillman | TKO | 2 (6) | 2:12 | 7 Dec 1984 | (United States) The Summit, Houston, Texas, U.S. | |
| 1 | Win | 1–0 | (Cuba) Rogelio Bolanos | KO | 2 (4) | ? | 22 Jun 1984 | (United States) National Guard Armory, West Palm Beach, Florida, U.S. | Professional debut |

== See also ==
- List of cruiserweight boxing champions

Sporting positions
Minor world boxing titles
| Preceded by Thomas Hearns | IBO cruiserweight champion April 8, 2000 - February 3, 2001 | Succeeded by Carl Thompson |
Major world boxing titles
| Preceded by Adolpho Washington | IBF cruiserweight champion June 21, 1997 - November 8, 1997 | Succeeded by Imamu Mayfield |
