= Taurus Sykes =

American boxer

Personal information
- Nickname: The Bull
- Nationality: American
- Born: Taurus Jabbar Sykes; May 20, 1975 (age 51) Brooklyn, New York U.S.
- Height: 6 ft 2 in (1.88 m)
- Weight: Heavyweight

Boxing career
- Reach: 71 in (180.3 cm)
- Stance: Orthodox

Boxing record
- Total fights: 32
- Wins: 25
- Win by KO: 7
- Losses: 8
- Draws: 1
- No contests: 0

Taurus Jabbar Sykes (born May 20, 1975) is an American former professional boxer. A heavyweight who turned pro in 1998, he fought against several contenders throughout his career, finishing with a record of 25–8–1 in 2015.

== Overview ==
Sykes, who hails from Brooklyn, is nicknamed "The Bull", due to his first name. Specifically, he hails from the Rutland Rd./the 90'z section of Brooklyn. He lost his 13th fight to unbeaten Owen Beck but that remained his only blemish on his record for a while in that he beat the likes of Israel Garcia (record 10-0), Charles Hatcher (15-2), Talmadge Griffis (21-1-3) and Sherman Williams to climb up the ladder. He drew with former Cruiser title holder Imamu Mayfield then beat Jovo Pudar (21-1) and even fringe contender Friday Ahunanya (20-2-1) in 2005. His only problem was his lack of power as only 7 of his first 25 wins have come the short route.

Undefeated KO artist Samuel Peter was the first to knock him out but lightly regarded southpaw Derek Bryant (18-4-1) also scored a TKO effectively ending any hopes of becoming a contender.

Former two-time heavyweight champ Hasim Rahman beat him in a 10-round decision. He was knocked out by IBF #1 contender Alexander Povetkin in Moscow on July 19, 2008.

== Professional boxing record ==
25 Wins (7 knockouts, 18 decisions), 8 Losses (4 knockouts, 4 decisions), 1 Draw
Result	Record	Opponent	Type	Round	Date	Location	Notes
Loss	16-0-0	(Cuba) Yasmany Consuegra	UD	8	26/3/2015	(United States) Hialeah Park Race Track, Hialeah, Florida	
Loss	19-0-1	(United States) Seth Mitchell	KO	5	11/12/2010	(United States) Mandalay Bay, Las Vegas, Nevada	Sykes knocked out at 1:42 of the fifth round.
Loss	8-14-1	(United States) Joseph Rabotte	SD	8	28/10/2010	(United States) Township Auditorium, Columbia, South Carolina	
Loss	15-0	(Russia) Alexander Povetkin	TKO	4	19/07/2008	(Russia) Olimpyskiy Sports Palace, Chekhov, Moscow Oblast	Referee stopped the bout at 1:43 of the fourth round.
Loss	41-6-2	(United States) Hasim Rahman	UD	10	14/06/2007	(United States) Main Street Armory, Rochester, New York	WBC NABF Heavyweight Title.
Win	5-7-2	(United States) Patrick Smith	KO	3	01/12/2006	(United States) Isleta Casino & Resort, Albuquerque, New Mexico	
Loss	18-4-1	(United States) Derek Bryant	TKO	4	21/04/2006	(United States) Augusta-Richmond County Civic Center, Augusta, Georgia	Referee stopped the bout at 1:57 of the fourth round.
Win	6-4-1	(United States) Domonic Jenkins	UD	8	03/03/2006	(United States) La Villita Assembly Hall, San Antonio, Texas	
Loss	23-0	(Nigeria) Samuel Peter	KO	2	02/07/2005	(United States) Reno Events Center, Reno, Nevada	WBC NABF/IBF USBA/WBA NABA Heavyweight Titles. Sykes knocked out at 2:07 of the second round.
Win	20-2-1	(Nigeria) Friday Ahunanya	UD	12	11/03/2005	(United States) Lea County Events Center, Hobbs, New Mexico	WBA NABA Heavyweight Title.
Win	15-25	(Ivory Coast) Onebo Maxime	TKO	2	10/12/2004	(United States) Isleta Casino & Resort, Albuquerque, New Mexico	Referee stopped the bout at 2:22 of the second round.
Win	21-1	(Serbia) Jovo Pudar	UD	10	21/02/2004	(United States) City Center Pavilion, Reno, Nevada	
Draw	23-4-1	(United States) Imamu Mayfield	PTS	10	07/06/2003	(United States) Flamingo Laughlin, Laughlin, Nevada	
Win	20-6-1	(The Bahamas) Sherman Williams	UD	10	20/10/2002	(United States) Emerald Queen Casino, Tacoma, Washington	
Win	18-1-2	(United States) James "Hurricane" Walton	MD	10	07/06/2002	(United States) Caesars Palace, Las Vegas, Nevada	
Win	21-1-3	(United States) Talmadge Griffis	UD	8	17/03/2002	(United States) Gold Country Casino, Oroville, California	
Win	13-12-1	(United States) Willie Chapman	UD	8	12/01/2002	(United States) Flamingo Laughlin, Laughlin, Nevada	
Win	8-11-1	(United States) Sean Williams	UD	6	13/10/2001	(United States) Stateline, Nevada	
Win	4-2-3	(United States) Todd Diggs	UD	6	28/09/2001	(United States) Caesars Palace, Las Vegas, Nevada	
Win	15-2	(United States) Charles "Buddy" Hatcher	UD	6	25/08/2001	(United States) Flamingo Laughlin, Laughlin, Nevada	
Win	10-0	(Puerto Rico) Israel Carlos Garcia	UD	6	29/04/2001	(United States) Club Amazura, Jamaica, Queens	
Loss	6-0	(Jamaica) Owen Beck	UD	6	07/10/2000	(United States) Mohegan Sun, Uncasville, Connecticut	
Win	10-7-2	(United States) Larry Carlisle	UD	6	29/06/2000	(United States) Hammerstein Ballroom, New York City	
Win	4-8	(Cuba) Lazaro Almanza	UD	6	27/04/2000	(United States) Hammerstein Ballroom, New York City	
Win	7-6	(United States) Marcus Johnson	TKO	4	31/03/2000	(United States) Hammerstein Ballroom, New York City	
Win	7-10	(United States) Kevin Rosier	PTS	4	24/02/2000	(United States) Hammerstein Ballroom, New York City	
Win	2-5	(United States) Willie Kyles	TKO	1	27/01/2000	(United States) Hammerstein Ballroom, New York City	
Win	1-3	(United States) Michael Morrell	KO	2	29/07/1999	(United States) Atlanta, Georgia	
Win	4-0	(United States) Drexie James	KO	6	18/06/1999	(United States) Old West Palm Beach National Guard Armory, West Palm Beach, Florida	James knocked out at 2:18 of the sixth round.
Win	6-14-2	(Puerto Rico) Miguel Otero Ocasio	UD	6	09/04/1999	(United States) Sons of Italy, West Palm Beach, Florida	
Win	2-0	(United States) Edward Slater	UD	4	12/03/1999	(United States) Venice Sports Center, Venice, Florida	
Win	--	(United States) Essene Felciano	TKO	3	20/11/1998	(United States) Ocala Livestock Pavilion, Ocala, Florida	Referee stopped the bout at 1:22 of the third round.
Win	1-1	(United States) Eddy Martinez	UD	4	07/11/1998	(United States) Sons of Italy, Lake Worth, Florida	
Win	1-4	(United States) Sam Williams	UD	4	12/09/1998	(United States) Sons of Italy, Lake Worth, Florida	
