= Mike Tyson vs. Clifford Etienne =

Boxing competition

Back to Business
- Date: February 22, 2003
- Venue: The Pyramid, Memphis, Tennessee

Tale of the tape
| Boxer | (United States) Mike Tyson | (United States) Clifford Etienne |
| Nickname | "Iron" | "The Black Rhino" |
| Hometown | Catskill, New York | Baton Rouge, Louisiana |
| Pre-fight record | 49–4 (2) (43 KO) | 24–1–1 (17 KO) |
| Age | 36 years, 7 months | 32 years, 11 months |
| Height | 5 ft 10 in (178 cm) | 6 ft 2 in (188 cm) |
| Weight | 225 3/4 lb (102 kg) | 222 3/4 lb (101 kg) |
| Style | Orthodox | Orthodox |
| Recognition | WBA/WBC; No. 4 Ranked Heavyweight; IBF; No. 11 Ranked Heavyweight; Former undisputed heavyweight champion | WBO; No. 3 Ranked Heavyweight; IBF; No. 7 Ranked Heavyweight; WBC; No. 11 Ranked Heavyweight |

Result
- Tyson wins via 1st-round KO

Mike Tyson vs. Clifford Etienne, billed as Back to Business, was a professional boxing match contested on February 22, 2003.

== Background ==
In his previous fight on June 8, 2002, Mike Tyson had met WBC and IBF heavyweight champion Lennox Lewis. In what would prove to be the final title match of Tyson's career, he was thoroughly outboxed by Lewis, who from the second round on, won every round on the judge's scorecards before knocking out Tyson in the eighth. Though Tyson's plans were not immediately known after his defeat, he announced in November that he would return to boxing on February 22, 2003 to take on fringe contender Clifford Etienne, with the fight taking place at the site of his previous fight with Lewis, the Pyramid Arena in Memphis. Etienne began his professional career with 19 consecutive victories and was named 2000's "Most Exciting Fighter to Watch" by The Ring magazine, but a loss to Fres Oquendo, in which Etienne was knocked down seven times in eight rounds, halted his progress. Only days before the fight was to take place, however, Tyson's new trainer Freddie Roach announced that he didn't think Tyson was ready for the fight and advised him to not go through with it, citing Tyson's lack of condition, as well as the fact that a loss to a journeyman like Etienne could end Tyson's career. Two days later, the fight was cancelled after both the fight's promoters and Tyson's team failed to hear back from Tyson about whether or not he would go through with the fight. However, Tyson arrived in Memphis the following day, seemingly putting the fight back on, but the fight was again held up as Etienne pulled out because several members of his camp had already left Memphis after the first cancellation. The following day, Etienne had a change of heart and stated "This morning, I woke up and I thought about it. I realized that I've worked all these weeks for this. I weighed everything out again. The fight is on."

== The fight ==
Despite concerns about Tyson's condition, the fight would prove to be one of his quickest victories. Tyson would start the match aggressively by throwing powerful combinations at Etienne, causing Etienne to clinch with Tyson, though the combined momentum of the two fighters caused both men to stumble to the mat and the referee then called a brief timeout to allow the fighters to regroup from the fall. After the fight was resumed, Tyson continued to throw wild power punches at Etienne, though none connected. Etienne responded by throwing several power punches of his own which caused Tyson to clinch. After being separated, Etienne missed Tyson with a left jab–right hand combination. Tyson then missed with a left hook, but rebounded with a strong right hand that sent Etienne down. Etienne laid flat on his back and made no attempt to get back up as the referee counted him out. Tyson was then awarded the knockout victory at 49 seconds of the first round. The victory would be the 50th and final one of Tyson's professional career.

== Aftermath ==
Prior the fight, there had been preliminary discussions about a possible rematch between Lewis and Tyson that would take place during June 2003 depending on how well Tyson performed against Etienne. Immediately after his impressive victory over Etienne, Jim Gray conducted an interview with Tyson and asked him if the rematch with Lewis was next. However, after being dominated by Lewis in the previous fight, Tyson was reluctant to face Lewis so soon and said he would need at least two more tuneup bouts before he would consider fighting Lewis again. However, with both men in their mid 30s and near end of their careers, Lewis insisted that the match take place in June and gave Tyson an April 15 deadline to accept the match, but Tyson passed on the match and instead agreed to face Oleg Maskaev on the undercard of Lewis' title defense against Vitali Klitschko, which was scheduled for June 21. However, Tyson pulled out of the deal and would not fight for the remainder of 2003 due in large part to Tyson filing for bankruptcy and subsequently filing a $100 million lawsuit against Don King. After a 17-month layoff, Tyson would finally return to boxing on July 30, 2004 to take on Danny Williams. Though he came into the fight as a 9–1 underdog, Williams would upset Tyson by knocking him out in the fourth round.

== Undercard ==
Confirmed bouts:

== Broadcasting ==
| Country | Broadcaster |
|---|---|
| Australia | Main Event |
| Canada | Viewers Choice |
| United Kingdom | Sky Sports |
| United States | Showtime |

| Preceded by vs. Lennox Lewis | Mike Tyson's bouts 22 February 2003 | Succeeded by vs. Danny Williams |
| Preceded by vs. Francois Botha | Clifford Etienne's bouts 22 February 2003 | Succeeded by vs. Shawn Robinson |
