= Vitali Klitschko vs. Danny Williams =

Boxing match

- Date: December 11, 2004
- Venue: Mandalay Bay Events Center, Paradise, Nevada, U.S.
- Title(s) on the line: WBC and The Ring heavyweight titles

Tale of the tape
Boxer	Vitali Klitschko	Danny Williams
Nickname	"Dr. Ironfist"	"The Brixton Bomber"
Hometown	Kyiv, Ukraine	Brixton, London, UK
Purse	$3,200,000	$300,000
Pre-fight record	34–2 (33 KO)	32–3 (27 KO)
Age	33 years, 4 months	31 years, 4 months
Height	6 ft 7 in (201 cm)	6 ft 1 1/2 in (187 cm)
Weight	250 lb (113 kg)	270 lb (122 kg)
Style	Orthodox	Orthodox
Recognition	WBC & The Ring; Heavyweight Champion	WBC; No. 9 Ranked Heavyweight

Result
- Klitschko defeated Williams via 8th round TKO

Vitali Klitschko vs. Danny Williams was a professional boxing match contested on December 11, 2004, for the WBC and The Ring heavyweight championship.

== Background ==
After defeating Corrie Sanders in April 2004 to win the WBC and Ring heavyweight titles, promoter Bob Arum was involved in talks to match Vitali with former champion Mike Tyson, however Tyson's shock defeat at the hands of Danny Williams in July put pay to those plans. Instead Klitschko opted to face Williams, who had originally been set to face Oleg Maskaev for the vacant WBU belt on October 9.

Speaking in an interview before the bout Klitschko speak about his disappointment that the Tyson match up had been derailed saying "Danny Williams broke my dream, Iron Mike, for me, was the dream. For many years I would see Tyson and say, 'Mike, I want to fight you.' He was on his way back and we were making conversation about a fight between me and him. So I was very surprised and disappointed when he lost. Everyone underestimated Danny Williams but I won't make that mistake. I was very impressed. He has hard punching, fast hands, good technique and a very big heart."

During the build up Williams' trainer Jim McDonnell criticized Klitschko for his past failed drug test, saying "Every time you turn on the television here there are stories about drug-taking in sport with the Balco inquiry. But let me tell you Danny's the real deal. He's never touched drugs and he never would. Like all the others who have used steroids, he [Klitschko] will never be as happy in his mind as a clean athlete. It doesn't matter how fit and strong he is for this fight, he knows with drugs that he could be stronger."

At the weight in, Williams equaled the record of Primo Carnera from his 1934 bout with Tommy Loughran as the heaviest man to fight for the world heavyweight title.

Klitschko was a 4 to 1 on favourite to win.

== The fights ==
=== Cotto vs. Bailey ===
In the chief support WBO Light welterweight titleholder Miguel Cotto, made the first defence of his belt against former titlist Randall Bailey.

Cotto would dominate the bout, dropping Bailey twice and opening cuts under both of his eyes. As a result of the cuts Bailey was examined by the ringside physician halfway through the sixth round. Following this Bailey expressed that he didn't want to continue and the referee stopped the fight.

Preceded by vs. Kelson Pinto	Miguel Cotto's bouts 11 December 2004	Succeeded by vs. DeMarcus Corley
Preceded by vs. Lester Yarbrough	Randall Bailey's bouts 11 December 2004	Succeeded by vs. Roberto Ortega

=== Main Event ===
Williams charged forward at the opening bell but Klitschko's jab would keep the challenger at bay. By the halfway point of the opening round Williams was cut on his right eyelid, and Klitschko was landing a number of heavy right hands. With just over 30 seconds left in the round a right hook sent Williams down, he beat the count and survived the round. Klitschko would continue to dominate, keeping Williams at range and making use of the challenger's poor defence and lack of mobility. Williams would be dropped again in the 3rd and 7th rounds, with both of his eyes swelling badly. A combination of a right uppercut, a straight left followed by a right cross dropped him for the fourth time in the 8th and while Williams rose to his feet, referee Jay Nady decided to wave it off.

== Aftermath ==
Klitschko dedicated his victory to democracy in his native Ukraine and also to the Ukrainian presidential candidate Viktor Yushchenko, whom he supported on 26 December 2004, election revote, saying "I feel this was the best performance of my career, but this victory was not just for me, but also for democracy in the Ukraine." He also complimented Williams saying "Danny Williams is a very hard puncher. A couple of times he punched me very hard. It's amazing he took so many punches and I have a big respect for him."

Williams praised the champion saying "He was a lot more awkward than I anticipated and was very clever, coming in and out on angles, he didn't hit as hard as Mike Tyson but he was more consistent with his punches. The thought of the world heavyweight title kept me going, but he was just too good."

There was talk of bout between Klitschko and former champion Hasim Rahman with his promoter Don King saying "I think Rahman beats Klitschko, but whatever happens I guarantee he will hit Klitschko properly at some stage, unlike Williams who was useless. There was no buzz here. Right now we are playing with ourselves. This sport needs rejuvenation."

In March 2005, terms were agreed for the two to face off on April 30 at Madison Square Garden. However the fight was postponed multiple times due to first thigh then back injuries, with Rahman taking an interim bout against Monte Barrett where he won an "interim" version of title. It was finally set to take place on November 12 but less than a week beforehand Klitschko postponed the bout again after suffering an injury to his right knee in sparring. After being given 90 days to defence against Rahman, Klitschko opted to retire instead. On November 10, 2005, the WBC voted to award its heavyweight championship to Rahman, making Rahman a two-time heavyweight champion. The Ring title would retain vacant until Wladimir Klitschko defeated Ruslan Chagaev in June 2009.

== Undercard ==
Confirmed bouts:

Winner	Loser	Weight division/title belt(s) disputed	Result
(Puerto Rico) Miguel Cotto	(United States) Randall Bailey	WBO World Light welterweight	6th-round TKO.
(United States) Carlos Navarro	(Dominican Republic) Agapito Sánchez	vacant WBC Continental Americas Super Featherweight	11th-round TKO.
(United States) Carlos Hernández	(Mexico) Juan Carlos Ramírez	Lightweight (10 rounds)	Split decision.
Preliminary bouts
(Brazil) Mohamad Abdallah Said Salem	(Germany) Danilo Haussler	Light heavyweight (8 rounds)	Split decision.
(Germany) Kai Kurzawa	(Brazil) Roberto Coelho	Light heavyweight (8 rounds)	Unanimous decision.

== Broadcasting ==
In Russia, the fight averaged 17.5 million viewers and drew a 13.5 rating in the 10+ demographic. In the United States, the bout recorded 120,000 PPV buys.

Country	Broadcaster
Australia	Main Event
Germany	ARD
Hungary	Sport1
Russia	Channel One
Ukraine	1+1
United Kingdom	Sky Sports
United States	HBO

Preceded by vs. Corrie Sanders	Vitali Klitschko's bouts 11 December 2004	Succeeded by vs. Samuel Peter
Preceded by vs. Mike Tyson	Danny Williams's bouts 11 December 2004	Succeeded by vs. Zoltan Petranyi
