= Miguel Cotto vs. DeMarcus Corley =

Boxing match

- Date: February 26, 2005
- Venue: Coliseo Rubén Rodríguez, Bayamón, Puerto Rico
- Title(s) on the line: WBO junior welterweight title

Tale of the tape
Boxer	Miguel Cotto	DeMarcus Corley
Nickname	"Junito"	"Chop Chop"
Hometown	Caguas, Puerto Rico	Washington, D.C., U.S.
Pre-fight record	22–0 (17 KO)	29–3–1 (16 KO)
Age	24 years, 3 months	30 years, 8 months
Height	5 ft 8 in (173 cm)	5 ft 7 in (170 cm)
Weight	140 lb (64 kg)	137 lb (62 kg)
Style	Orthodox	Orthodox
Recognition	WBO; Junior Welterweight Champion; The Ring; No. 5 Ranked Light Welterweight	WBO; No. 9 Ranked Light Welterweight; The Ring; No. 7 Ranked Light Welterweight

Result
- Cotto defeats Corley by 5th round TKO

Miguel Cotto vs. DeMarcus Corley was a professional boxing match contested on February 26, 2005, for the WBO junior welterweight championship. It was held in Bayamón, Puerto Rico

== Background ==
Much expectation preceded the fight, which was sponsored in Puerto Rico by DirecTV. The then recently inaugurated Tren Urbano had to be specially enabled for this fight, as fans had overcrowded the parking area with their cars the last time Cotto had a fight in Puerto Rico and the Puerto Rican tourism department saw this event as a perfect occasion to demonstrate the new railway's conveniences to fans across the island. Cotto participated in a ceremonial trip from a station near José Miguel Agrelot coliseum in San Juan to the fight's venue, Bayamón's Rubén Rodríguez Coliseum.

Corley, meanwhile, arrived in Puerto Rico on Wednesday, February 23. According to El Vocero, the newspaper that interviewed the former world champion on arrival at Luis Muñoz Marín International Airport, Corley showed confidence and kept smiling, but predicted a unanimous decision win, which is somewhat uncommon among boxers, as they usually predict knockout wins.

Corley trained the last few days before the fight at the same gymnasium that Edwin Rosario used during Rosario's prime.

== The fight ==
The fight was broadcast to the United States live on HBO Boxing's "Boxing After Dark" leg. Cotto wore trunks that had the flags of every Hispanic country.

About half a minute into the fight, Corley went down from a right cross to the head. He was rocked often the rest of the first round, but he was able to stay on his feet.

Cotto kept hitting Corley with stamina-reducing shots to the body and the head in round two, but he lost a point, when, without any previous warnings, referee Ismael Quinones Falu deducted it from the scorecards after Corley complained that Cotto had hurt him on the crotch area. It was a somewhat unusual move by the referee: usually they give boxers a number of warnings before actually deducting a point for illegal fighting tactics.

In the third round, Corley hit Cotto flush with a right hand to the chin, and Cotto, who was arguably having the worst round of his career, almost fell. Corley mounted an attack, pinning Cotto against the ropes for most of the round. Cotto was then suddenly struck by a low blow himself, and he went to the floor. The referee gave him time to recover, but did not take any points away from Corley. Towards the end of the round, both fighters engaged in an exchange of powerful lefts, with Cotto's barely missing Corley's body, but Corley's getting Cotto on the head and sending him to the ropes again.

Having recuperated in between rounds, Cotto picked up the fight's momentum again in round four, using his jab, and then connecting with various combinations towards the end of the round.

By round five, Cotto sported a cut inside his nose and he also had a swollen eye. Corley looked like he had taken tremendous punishment as well; he looked tired and his face looked like it had a few small cuts too.

Cotto, who weighed 157 pounds (71 kg) on HBO's weight balance on the day of the fight compared to Corley's 140 pounds (63.5 kg), pinned Corley against the ropes. A combination of punches to the body and head sent Corley down for a second time. Corley got up and tried to weather the storm by fighting back, but he was taking a lot of punishment as he decided to go down to one knee in order to take a rest. The third knockdown, however, would become the subject of a small controversy, as, instead of counting on Corley, Quinones Falu decided to stop the fight at that moment, giving Cotto the victory by a fifth-round technical knockout. After the stoppage, Corley reacted with a menacing look towards the referee, but no action was taken by him against Quinones Falu.

== Aftermath ==
HBO's instant replays showed that none of the punches that Cotto threw before Corley decided to take a knee had actually landed. Nevertheless, since Corley's third visit to the canvas happened after Corley took a conscious decision to fall in order to take the extra rest, boxing rules dictated that it had to be counted as a knockdown. Soon after the fight was stopped, HBO analyzers were quick to signal the result as a "hometown stoppage", especially Larry Merchant. But their claims were quickly countered by Corley himself, who admitted to going down for the third time as a strategy to avoid further punishment from Cotto and maybe buy himself more fight time.

After the fight, both fighters agreed that they should have a rematch.

== Undercard ==
Confirmed bouts:

== Broadcasting ==
Country	Broadcaster
United States	HBO

Preceded by vs. Randall Bailey	Miguel Cotto's bouts 26 February 2005	Succeeded by vs. Muhammad Abdullaev
Preceded by vs. Darryl Tyson	DeMarcus Corley's bouts 26 February 2005	Succeeded by vs. Kevin Carter
