= Imamu Mayfield =

American boxer

- Born: Imamu Amiri Mayfield; April 19, 1972 (age 54); Freehold Borough, New Jersey
- Nationality: American
- Height: 6 ft 3 in (1.91 m)
- Weight: 197 lb (89 kg; 14.1 st)
- Division: Cruiserweight; Heavyweight
- Reach: 78 in (200 cm)
- Style: Boxing
- Stance: Orthodox
- Fighting out of: Perth Amboy, New Jersey
- Years active: 1994-2008

Professional boxing record
- Total: 39
- Wins: 26
- By knockout: 19
- Losses: 10
- By knockout: 7
- Draws: 3

Mixed martial arts record
- Total: 1
- Wins: 0
- Losses: 1
- By submission: 1

Other information
- Boxing record from BoxRec
- Mixed martial arts record from Sherdog

Imamu Amiri Mayfield (born April 19, 1972) is an American professional boxer who competed from 1994 to 2008, and 2016 to 2017.

== Career ==
Mayfield turned pro in 1994 and was a popular local fighter known for being on boxing cards in various New Jersey venues. He won the IBF Cruiserweight Title with a win over Uriah Grant in 1997. In his first Title defense Mayfield traveled to Hull, England and defeated formerly unbeaten British champion Terry Dunstan by KO. The next year, being promoted by the infamous Don "Only in America" King, lost a purse bid to M and M promotions. Mayfield was supposed to fight Saul Montana after coming off a tough title defense against Dunstan but instead was forced to fight a mandatory defense against Arthur Williams. He lost the belt to Arthur Williams via a 9th round TKO. In 2000, he earned a shot at WBC Cruiserweight Title holder Juan Carlos Gomez, but lost by KO in the 3rd round. Mayfield asked to be released from DKP sighting irreconcilable issues. Mayfield then signed with the before mentioned M and M and won the USBA title in Atlantic City, New Jersey with a KO over up and coming contender Gary Wilcox. The next year he lost an IBF Cruiserweight Title Eliminator bout against Jorge Fernando Castro.

In 2002, he then moved up to heavyweight, where in his first fight as a heavy was significantly undersized. He went on to clearly outpoint and hurt Peter Ohkello. Ohkello went on to fight for the WBC heavy weight Title in 2006 in Russia. Although he drew with Taurus Sykes in 2003, he was TKO'd in 2004 by journeyman Lawrence Clay Bey. After the loss to Clay Bey, he moved back down to Cruiserweight.

Mayfield moved back up to heavyweight again and took on Alexander Povetkin in 2006, and lost via a third round TKO. This was followed by another stoppage loss to rising contender Johnathon Banks.

He also competed in one mixed martial arts bout, against Japanese wrestler Kazuyuki Fujita at Inoki Bom-Ba-Ye 2003 on December 31 (New Year's Eve), 2003. The rules of the fight dictated that the fighters would be stood up after 20 seconds on the ground, which made the fight fairer for Mayfield given his lack of grappling skills. Fujita was able to choke Mayfield unconscious while he was still standing in the second round.

== Professional boxing record ==
39 fights	26 wins	10 losses
By knockout	19	7
By decision	7	3
Draws	3	

No.	Result	Record	Opponent	Type	Round, time	Date	Location	Notes
39	Draw	26–10–3	(United States) Lamont Capers	SD	8	19/08/2017	(United States) Claridge Hotel & Casino, Atlantic City, U.S.	
38	Win	26–10–2	(United States) Anthony Caputo Smith	KO	6	12/11/2016	(United States) Claridge Hotel & Casino, Atlantic City, U.S.	
37	Loss	25–10–2	(United States) Daniel Pasciolla	UD	6	19/03/2016	(United States) Claridge Hotel & Casino, Atlantic City, U.S.	For vacant New Jersey State Heavyweight title
36	Loss	25–9–2	(United States) Johnathon Banks	TKO	1	23/02/2008	(United States) Madison Square Garden, New York City, U.S.	Referee stopped the bout at 1:49 of the first round.
35	Loss	25–8–2	(Russia) Alexander Povetkin	KO	3	10/12/2006	Olimpiisky, Moscow, Russia	
34	Loss	25–7–2	(Poland) Krzysztof Włodarczyk	UD	12	25/03/2006	Siedlce, Poland	IBC/WBC FECARBOX Cruiserweight Titles.
33	Win	25–6–2	(United States) Rayco Saunders	UD	8	02/12/2005	(United States) The Blue Horizon, Philadelphia, Pennsylvania, U.S.	
32	Loss	24–6–2	(Nigeria) Emmanuel Nwodo	TKO	1	03/12/2004	(United States) The Blue Horizon, Philadelphia, Pennsylvania, U.S.	Referee stopped the bout at 1:24 of the first round.
31	Loss	24–5–2	(United States) Lawrence Clay-Bey	TKO	5	02/07/2004	(United States) Pala Casino Resort and Spa, Pala, California, U.S.	IBA Continental Heavyweight Title.
30	Win	24–4–2	(United States) Rayco Saunders	UD	6	23/04/2004	(United States) The Blue Horizon, Philadelphia, Pennsylvania, U.S.	
29	Draw	23–4–2	(United States) Taurus Sykes	PTS	10	07/06/2003	(United States) Flamingo Hotel and Casino, Laughlin, Laughlin, Nevada, U.S.	
28	Win	23–4–1	(United States) Franklin Edmondson	TKO	6	03/04/2003	(United States) Asbury Park Convention Hall, Asbury Park, New Jersey, U.S.	Referee stopped the bout at 2:05 of the sixth round.
27	Win	22–4–1	(Uganda) Okello Peter	UD	6	20/09/2002	(United States) Jersey City Armory, Jersey City, New Jersey, U.S.	
26	Loss	21–4–1	(Argentina) Jorge Castro	RTD	9	20/10/2001	Buenos Aires, Argentina	Mayfield retired at 0:01 of the ninth round.
25	Win	21–3–1	(United States) Gary Wilcox	TKO	10	30/06/2001	(United States) Trump Taj Mahal, Atlantic City, New Jersey, U.S.	IBF USBA Cruiserweight Title.
24	Win	20–3–1	(Argentina) Oscar Angel Gomez	RTD	6	17/02/2001	Nueve de Julio, Argentina	
23	Loss	19–3–1	(Cuba) Juan Carlos Gómez	KO	3	06/05/2000	Swissotel, Neuss, Germany	WBC Cruiserweight Title.
22	Draw	19–2–1	(Dominica) Louis Azille	PTS	12	18/12/1999	(United States) Grand Casino, Tunica, Mississippi, U.S.	NABA Cruiserweight Title.
21	Win	19–2	(United States) Franklin Edmondson	KO	4	27/03/1999	(United States) Jai Alai Fronton, Miami, Florida, U.S.	
20	Loss	18–2	(United States) Arthur Williams	TKO	9	30/10/1998	(United States) Grand Casino Biloxi, Biloxi, Mississippi, U.S.	Lost IBF cruiserweight title
19	Win	18–1	(United Kingdom) Terry Dunstan	KO	11	28/03/1998	(United Kingdom) Ice Arena, Hull, England	Retained IBF cruiserweight title
18	Win	17–1	(Jamaica) Uriah Grant	UD	12	08/11/1997	(United States) Thomas & Mack Center, Las Vegas, Nevada, U.S.	Won IBF cruiserweight title
17	Win	16–1	(United States) Cliff Nellon	TKO	7	11/04/1997	(United States) Ukrainian Cultural Center, Somerset, New Jersey, U.S.	
16	Win	15–1	(United States) Elton Singleton	KO	8	07/02/1997	(United States) Ukrainian Cultural Center, Somerset, New Jersey, U.S.	
15	Win	14–1	(United States) Bill Medei	TKO	2	15/11/1996	(United States) Ukrainian Cultural Center, Somerset, New Jersey, U.S.	
14	Win	13–1	(United States) Ron Preston	KO	4	20/09/1996	(United States) Ukrainian Cultural Center, Somerset, New Jersey, U.S.	
13	Win	12–1	(United States) Bernard McLean	KO	1	28/06/1996	(United States) Ukrainian Cultural Center, Somerset, New Jersey, U.S.	
12	Win	11–1	(United States) Ernest Mateen	TKO	4	03/05/1996	(United States) Ukrainian Cultural Center, Somerset, New Jersey, U.S.	Referee stopped the bout at 0:48 of the fourth round.
11	Win	10–1	(United States) Charles Price	KO	4	01/03/1996	(United States) Ukrainian Cultural Center, Somerset, New Jersey, U.S.	
10	Win	9–1	(United States) Exum Speight	PTS	8	01/12/1995	(United States) Ukrainian Cultural Center, Somerset, New Jersey, U.S.	
9	Win	8–1	(United States) Ron Preston	PTS	4	20/10/1995	(United States) Ukrainian Cultural Center, Somerset, New Jersey, U.S.	
8	Win	7–1	(United States) Lamont Doyle	TKO	2	29/06/1995	(United States) Ukrainian Cultural Center, Somerset, New Jersey, U.S.	
7	Win	6–1	(United States) Ismael Gneco	UD	6	04/05/1995	(United States) Ukrainian Cultural Center, Somerset, New Jersey, U.S.	
6	Win	5–1	(United States) Arnold Fountain	TKO	1	19/01/1995	(United States) Ukrainian Cultural Center, Somerset, New Jersey, U.S.	
5	Win	4–1	(United States) Lew Chester	KO	1	17/11/1994	(United States) Ukrainian Cultural Center, Somerset, New Jersey, U.S.	
4	Loss	3–1	(Barbados) Richie Brown	PTS	4	13/05/1994	(United States) Hotel Pennsylvania, New York City, U.S.	
3	Win	3–0	(United States) Randall Richardson	KO	3	23/04/1994	(United States) Fernwood Resort, Bushkill, Pennsylvania, U.S.	
2	Win	2–0	(United States) Alonzo Knowles	KO	2	04/03/1994	(United States) Hotel Pennsylvania, New York City, U.S.	
1	Win	1–0	(United States) Matt Davis	KO	1	05/02/1994	(United States) Ocean Place Hilton, Long Branch, New Jersey, U.S.	

== Mixed martial arts record ==
Professional record breakdown
1 match	0 wins	1 loss
By knockout	0	0
By submission	0	1
By decision	0	0

Res.	Record	Opponent	Method	Event	Date	Round	Time	Location	Notes
Loss	0-1	(Japan) Kazuyuki Fujita	Submission (arm-triangle choke)	Inoki Bom-Ba-Ye 2003	December 31, 2003	2	2:15	Kobe, Japan	

== See also ==
- List of world cruiserweight boxing champions

Sporting positions
World boxing titles
Preceded by Uriah Grant	IBF cruiserweight champion November 8, 1997 - October 30, 1998	Succeeded by Arthur Williams
