= Derek Bryant (boxer) =

American boxer

Derek "The One Man Riot" Bryant (born April 19, 1971) is an American professional boxer.

== Biography ==
Bryant was born in Philadelphia, Pennsylvania. He is a journeyman fighter who has appeared on the TV program Friday Night Fights. He holds wins against Jorge Luis Gonzalez, Taurus Sykes, Robert Wiggins and had a draw with Lawrence Clay Bey. He has lost fights to Eric Kirkland, Malcolm Tann, Jovo Pudar, and Ran Nakash.

== Professional boxing record ==
28 fights	20 wins	7 losses
By knockout	17	3
By decision	3	4
Draws	1	

Result	Record	Opponent	Type	Round	Date	Location	Notes
Loss	20–7–1	(Israel) Ran Nakash	UD	8	January 21, 2012	(United States) Roseland Ballroom, New York City	
Loss	20–6–1	(United States) Seth Mitchell	TKO	1	July 31, 2010	(United States) Mandalay Bay, Las Vegas, Nevada	Referee stopped the bout at 1:45 of the first round.
Loss	20–5–1	(United States) Jason Estrada	UD	8	November 29, 2008	(United States) Twin River Casino, Lincoln, Rhode Island	
Win	20–4–1	(United States) Joe Stofle	TKO	1	January 20, 2007	(United States) Ohio Expo Center Coliseum, Columbus, Ohio	Referee stopped the bout at 1:55 of the first round.
Win	19–4–1	(United States) Taurus Sykes	TKO	4	April 21, 2006	(United States) Augusta-Richmond County Civic Center, Augusta, Georgia	Referee stopped the bout at 1:57 of the fourth round.
Draw	18–4–1	(United States) Lawrence Clay Bey	MD	10	05/08/2005	(United States) Foxwoods, Mashantucket, Connecticut	
Loss	18–4	(United States) Malcolm Tann	UD	8	09/06/2005	(United States) Pechanga Resort and Casino, Temecula, California	
Win	18–3	(Puerto Rico) Alex Gonzales	TKO	2	May 13, 2005	(United States) A La Carte Event Pavilion, Tampa, Florida	Referee stopped the bout at 1:34 of the second round.
Loss	17–3	(United States) Robert Wiggins	UD	8	June 26, 2004	(United States) Silverton Casino Lodge, Enterprise, Nevada	
Loss	17–2	(Serbia) Jovo Pudar	TKO	6	November 22, 2003	(United States) Caesars Tahoe, Stateline, Nevada	Referee stopped the bout at 2:10 of the sixth round.
Win	17–1	(United States) Barry Lineberger	SD	6	August 16, 2003	(United States) Mohegan Sun, Uncasville, Connecticut	
Loss	16–1	(United States) Eric Kirkland	TKO	9	March 31, 2003	(United States) Statehouse Convention Center, Little Rock, Arkansas	Referee stopped the bout at 0:59 of the ninth round.
Win	16–0	(United States) Damon Reed	TKO	2	Jan 25, 2003	(United States) Pechanga Resort and Casino, Temecula, California	Referee stopped the bout at 2:54 of the second round.
Win	15–0	(United States) Frankie Swindell	TKO	7	September 29, 2002	(United States) Palace Indian Gaming Center, Lemoore, California	Referee stopped the bout at 0:52 of the seventh round.
Win	14–0	(United States) Robert Wiggins	TKO	4	04/06/2002	(United States) Morrell Park, Savannah, Georgia	Referee stopped the bout at 1:04 of the fourth round.
Win	13–0	(United States) Lovy Page	KO	5	March 29, 2002	(United States) Paris Las Vegas, Las Vegas, Nevada	Page knocked out at 1:32 of the fifth round.
Win	12–0	(Cuba) Jorge Luis Gonzalez	TKO	1	January 18, 2002	(United States) Paris Las Vegas, Las Vegas, Nevada	Referee stopped the bout at 2:33 of the first round.
Win	11–0	(United States) Wes Taylor	TKO	1	December 14, 2001	(United States) Pennsylvania Convention Center, Philadelphia, Pennsylvania	
Win	10–0	(United States) Nicholus Nurse	TKO	2	07/09/2000	(United States) Grand Casino, Gulfport, Mississippi	Referee stopped the bout at 1:03 of the second round.
Win	9–0	(United States) Clarence Goins	KO	2	February 25, 2000	(United States) Philadelphia, Pennsylvania	
Win	8–0	(United States) Donald Tucker	TKO	1	November 19, 1999	(United States) Philadelphia, Pennsylvania	
Win	7–0	(Puerto Rico) Jose Felipe Colon	UD	6	January 21, 1999	(United States) Marksville, Louisiana	
Win	6–0	(United States) William Morris	TKO	4	September 25, 1998	(United States) Shuler Gymnasium, Philadelphia, Pennsylvania	
Win	5–0	(United States) Kelvin Hale	TKO	1	04/09/1998	(United States) Trump Taj Majal, Atlantic City, New Jersey	Referee stopped the bout at 2:29 of the first round.
Win	4–0	(United States) Albert Stewart	UD	4	July 28, 1998	(United States) Horseshoe Casino, Tunica, Mississippi	
Win	3–0	(United States) June Thomas	KO	1	March 13, 1998	(United States) The Blue Horizon, Philadelphia, Pennsylvania	
Win	2–0	(United States) Ricardo Dabney	KO	2	February 13, 1998	(United States) The Blue Horizon, Philadelphia, Pennsylvania	
Win	1–0	(United States) Levay King	TKO	1	January 23, 1998	(United States) The Blue Horizon, Philadelphia, Pennsylvania	
