= Ernest Mateen =

American boxer (1966–2012)

Ernest Mateen

Ernest Mateen (June 3, 1966 – November 6, 2012, in Bedford-Stuyvesant, Brooklyn, New York), nicknamed 'M-16', was a United States and IBU Cruiserweight (boxing) champion. He was shot to death by his wife in a case of probable self-defense.

== Amateur career ==
As an amateur boxer in New York City, M-16 Mateen won two New York Golden Gloves Championships. Mateen won the 1988 and 1989 178 pound Open Championships. In 1988, Mateen defeated Clinton Mitchell of the Police Athletic League in the finals to win the Championship. Mitchell then turned pro and defeated Bernard Hopkins on December 11, 1988, in their professional debuts. M-16 Mateen remained an amateur, and in 1989 repeated as 178 pound Open Champion again by defeating Jade Scott of the Police Athletic League in the New York Golden Gloves championship final. Mateen trained at the Bedford-Stuyvesant, Brooklyn BA in 1988 and at Gleason's Gym in 1989. He was trained in the amateurs by his father, Ernest Mateen Sr., an auto mechanic and a father of nine, who was shot and killed in mid-afternoon in a crowded open-air vegetable market in Canarsie, Brooklyn in May 1990.

== Professional career ==
M-16 Mateen turned pro in the Light heavyweight boxing division on January 13, 1991, and won by decision over undefeated David Telesco, who went on to become the USBA Light heavyweight champion ranked # 1 by the WBC, WBA and IBF. Mateen drew with, then later defeated Tim Wilson, and won by decision over David Telesco again. M-16 Mateen went undefeated in his first twenty professional bouts, including wins over 12-0 Steve Pannell and 20-0 Billy Lewis. M-16 Mateen also defeated Kevin Watts, Dale Jackson, and Drake Thadzi (who later defeated James Toney), fighters with a combined 65 wins, en route to winning the Nevada State and World Boxing Council Continental Americas Light heavyweight boxing title and rising as high as # 2 in the world ratings, before losing his title in the tenth round to Charles Williams (boxer). Williams had fought in 11 consecutive IBF Light heavyweight world title fights before fighting Mateen. In a controversial ending, M-16 Mateen was later disqualified in the fifth round of a Light heavyweight world title bout against champion James Toney.

M-16 Mateen went on to decision John Scully twice, later known as the trainer of Chad Dawson, and drew with future Cruiserweight (boxing) champion O'Neil Bell. M-16 went on to win the United States Boxing Organization Cruiserweight title by 12-round decision over Joey DeGrandis. M-16 Mateen went on to win the International Boxing Union version of the Cruiserweight (boxing) title, stopping Uriah Grant twice in title bouts. Grant went on to stop Thomas Hearns.

M-16 Mateen finished with a professional record 30-12-3 with 10 knockouts. In his last two fights, M-16 Mateen lost to future top contender Matt Godfrey, but finished his career with a ten-round unanimous decision over veteran Terry Porter in Memphis, Tennessee, on June 10, 2006, leaving the ring a winner at age 40.

== Professional boxing record ==
30 Wins (10 knockouts, 20 decisions), 12 Losses (10 knockouts, 2 decisions), 3 Draws Archived April 13, 2014, at the Wayback Machine
Result	Record	Opponent	Type	Round	Date	Location	Notes
Win	30-12-3	(United States) Terry Porter	UD	10	10/06/2006	(United States) Memphis, Tennessee, U.S.	
Loss	29-12-3	(United States) Matt Godfrey	TKO	2	13/02/2006	(United States) Dunkin Donuts Center, Providence, Rhode Island, U.S.	Referee stopped the bout at 1:51 of the second round.
Win	29-11-3	(United States) Ronnie Smith	UD	6	21/01/2006	(United States) Olive Branch, Mississippi, U.S.	
Win	28-11-3	(Jamaica) Uriah Grant	TKO	8	15/11/2003	(United States) Boynton Beach, Florida, U.S.	IBU Cruiserweight Title. Referee stopped the bout at 1:10 of the eighth round.
Loss	27-11-3	(Kazakhstan) Vassiliy Jirov	TKO	7	07/08/2003	(United States) Pechanga Resort and Casino, Temecula, California, U.S.	Referee stopped the bout at 1:09 of the seventh round.
Loss	27-10-3	(United States) Rich LaMontagne	TKO	6	02/05/2003	(United States) Foxwoods Resort Casino, Mashantucket, Connecticut, U.S.	
Win	27-9-3	(Jamaica) Uriah Grant	TD	9	09/11/2002	(United States) South Florida Fairgrounds Expo Center, West Palm Beach, Florida, U.S.	USBO Cruiserweight Title. Doctor stopped the bout due to a cut.
Win	26-9-3	(United States) Joey DeGrandis	UD	12	27/09/2002	(United States) Ramada, Rosemont, Illinois, U.S.	USBO Cruiserweight Title.
Draw	25-9-3	(Jamaica) O'Neil Bell	TD	3	26/04/2002	(United States) Ramada, Rosemont, Illinois, U.S.	Referee stopped the bout due to a cut caused by an accidental headbutt.
Win	25-9-2	(United States) Iceman John Scully	UD	8	19/04/2001	(United States) New Haven Coliseum, New Haven, Connecticut, U.S.	
Loss	24-9-2	(United States) Antonio Tarver	KO	1	29/02/2000	(United States) Plaza Hotel & Casino, Las Vegas, Nevada, U.S.	
Loss	24-8-2	(United States) Will Taylor	TKO	6	07/11/1997	(United States) First Union Center, Philadelphia, Pennsylvania, U.S.	IBF USBA Light Heavyweight Title. Referee stopped the bout at 3:00 of the sixth round.
Draw	24-7-2	(Jamaica) Chris Johnson	TD	3	03/10/1997	(United States) Tropicana Hotel & Casino, Atlantic City, New Jersey, U.S.	
Win	24-7-1	(United States) Iceman John Scully	UD	10	29/06/1997	(United States) Dressler Arena, Hartford, Connecticut, U.S.	
Loss	23-7-1	(United States) David Telesco	TKO	8	11/04/1997	(United States) Capitol Theater, Port Chester, New York, U.S.	New York Light Heavyweight Title.
Loss	23-6-1	(United States) Imamu Mayfield	TKO	4	03/05/1996	(United States) Somerset, New Jersey, U.S.	Referee stopped the bout at 0:48 of the fourth round.
Loss	23-5-1	(United States) James Toney	DQ	5	Sep 9, 1995	(United States) Caesars Palace, Paradise, Nevada, U.S.	WBU Light Heavyweight Title. Mateen disqualified at 2:59 of the fifth round.
Loss	23-4-1	(United States) Tim Hillie	PTS	10	29/04/1995	(United States) US Air Arena, Landover, Maryland, U.S.	
Loss	23-3-1	(United Kingdom) Garry Delaney	TKO	7	18/03/1995	(Republic of Ireland) Green Glens Arena, Millstreet, Ireland	WBO Intercontinental Light Heavyweight Title.
Win	23-2-1	(United States) Ron Preston	PTS	10	18/11/1994	(United States) Webster, Massachusetts, U.S.	
Win	22-2-1	(United States) Luis Oliveira	TKO	1	30/09/1994	(United States) Worcester, Massachusetts, U.S.	
Loss	21-2-1	(United States) Rudy Nix	TKO	2	30/06/1994	(United States) Trump Castle, Atlantic City, New Jersey, U.S.	
Loss	21-1-1	(United States) Charles Williams	TKO	10	07/04/1994	(United States) Robinsonville, Mississippi, U.S.	WBC Continental Americas Light Heavyweight Title.
Win	21-0-1	(United States) Robert Thomas	PTS	10	21/01/1994	(United States) Hotel Pennsylvania, New York City, New York, U.S.	
Win	20-0-1	(United States) John McClain	UD	10	09/12/1993	(United States) Paramount Theatre, New York City, New York, U.S.	
Win	19-0-1	(United States) Billy Lewis	TKO	10	06/10/1993	(United States) Harrah's Atlantic City, Atlantic City, New Jersey, U.S.	WBC Continental Americas Light Heavyweight Title.
Win	18-0-1	(United States) Tim St Clair	UD	10	30/07/1993	(United States) Ramada, New York City, New York, U.S.	New York Light Heavyweight Title.
Win	17-0-1	(Malawi) Drake Thadzi	MD	10	13/05/1993	(United States) Atlantic City, New Jersey, U.S.	
Win	16-0-1	(United States) Steve Pannell	TKO	1	08/04/1993	(United States) Atlantic City, New Jersey, U.S.	
Win	15-0-1	(United States) Kevin Watts	TKO	4	26/02/1993	(United States) Hauppauge, New York, U.S.	Referee stopped the bout at 2:14 of the fourth round.
Win	14-0-1	(Greece) John Spiros	TKO	4	30/01/1993	(United States) New York City, New York, U.S.	
Win	13-0-1	(United States) Roosevelt Williams	TKO	7	04/12/1992	(United States) Bushkill, Pennsylvania, U.S.	
Win	12-0-1	(United States) Hector Rosario	PTS	10	23/10/1992	(United States) Bushkill, Pennsylvania, U.S.	
Win	11-0-1	(United States) Jamal Arbubakar	DQ	2	18/09/1992	(United States) Bushkill, Pennsylvania, U.S.	
Win	10-0-1	(United States) Art Bayliss	UD	8	31/07/1992	(United States) Bushkill, Pennsylvania, U.S.	
Win	9-0-1	(United States) Keith Providence	TKO	3	28/05/1992	(United States) Monticello, New York, U.S.	
Win	8-0-1	(United States) Dale Jackson	PTS	8	08/05/1992	(United States) Allentown, Pennsylvania, U.S.	
Win	7-0-1	(Greece) John Spiros	SD	4	10/04/1992	(United States) New York City, New York, U.S.	
Win	6-0-1	Julio Hernandez	TKO	3	23/03/1992	(United States) Harrah's Atlantic City, Atlantic City, New Jersey, U.S.	
Win	5-0-1	(United States) Exum Speight	UD	4	06/03/1992	(United States) Callicoon, New York, U.S.	
Win	4-0-1	(United States) Tim Wilson	UD	4	16/01/1992	(United States) Elizabeth, New Jersey, U.S.	
Win	3-0-1	(United States) David Telesco	PTS	6	26/11/1991	(United States) Westchester County Center, White Plains, New York, U.S.	
Win	2-0-1	(United States) Rick Beechum	TKO	2	24/08/1991	(United States) Shawnee State University, Portsmouth, Ohio, U.S.	
Draw	1-1	(United States) Tim Wilson	PTS	4	17/05/1991	(United States) New York City, New York, U.S.	
Win	1-0	(United States) David Telesco	PTS	4	22/03/1991	(United States) Callicoon, New York, U.S.	

== Life after retirement ==
Mateen worked as a licensed professional boxing trainer in New York and New Jersey, with particular attention to the career of his brother, rising light heavyweight boxer Hamid-Abdul Mateen.
