= Lawrence Clay-Bey =

American boxer

Personal information
- Born: Lawrence Marvin Clay-Bey; December 14, 1965 (age 60) Bloomfield, Connecticut, U.S.
- Height: 6 ft 3 in (191 cm)
- Weight: Heavyweight

Boxing career
- Reach: 75 in (191 cm)
- Stance: Orthodox

Boxing record
- Total fights: 25
- Wins: 21
- Win by KO: 16
- Losses: 3
- Draws: 1
Medal record
Men's boxing
United States National Championships
Gold medal – first place	1995 Hartford, CT	Super heavyweight
Gold medal – first place	1996 Hartford, CT	Super heavyweight
Representing United States
World Amateur Championships
Bronze medal – third place	1995 Berlin	Super heavyweight

Lawrence Marvin Clay-Bey (born December 14, 1965) is an American former professional boxer who fought at heavyweight. As an amateur he was a two-time winner (1995 and 1996) of the United States National Championships as well as a bronze medalist at the 1995 World Championships, all in the super heavyweight division.

== Amateur career ==
Lawrence Clay-Bey started to box at the age of 26. He lost his first two amateur fights but stuck with it and eventually won the National Golden Gloves in his next eight fights. At this point he weighed around 260 pounds.

Clay-Bey won a super heavyweight bronze medal at the 1995 World Amateur Boxing Championships in Berlin, later KOd Joe Mesi to win the right to go to the 1996 Summer Olympics in Atlanta, Georgia and was also team USA's captain. However he was put out of the tournament in his first fight by a close/controversial 10-8 decision to eventual Gold medalist Wladimir Klitschko. He was the only fighter Klitschko had problems with as he managed to rattle Klitschko, prompting the referee to issue a standing 8 count. After the fight he raised some eyebrows downplaying it as "just a loss" which let journalists question his dedication. He finished the amateurs with a 60-9 record.

- United States amateur (AAU) Super Heavyweight champion (1995, 1996)

== Professional career ==
After a year of debating if he wanted to turn pro Lawrence Clay-Bey decided he wanted to see how far he could go. He got into much better shape and shed 25-30 pounds to a better fighting weight of 235. He turned pro in 1997 and he easily blew past his early opponents despite them having more experience and glossy pro records. Clay-Bey was thought very highly of, and was being groomed to be a future title holder until he met the streaking Clifford Etienne in 2000. The two traded shots round after round with Etienne being the more active of the two, and Etienne took the decision. After the loss to Etienne, Clay-Bey began putting on weight and coming into fights out of shape. But he stayed busy and took a victory over promising prospect Charles Shufford in 2003, setting up a fight against Eliecer Castillo. Castillo KO'd Clay-Bey in the 9th round. Clay-Bey's once promising career drifted into obscurity. Although he was able to beat former cruiserweight champ Imamu Mayfield in 2004, he dropped a decision to Sinan Samil Sam and drew with Derek Bryant in 2005.

== Professional boxing record ==
21 Wins (16 knockouts, 5 decisions), 3 Losses (1 knockout, 2 decisions), 1 Draw
Result	Record	Opponent	Type	Round	Date	Location	Notes
Draw	18-4	(United States) Derek Bryant	MD	10	2005-08-05	(United States) Mashantucket, Connecticut, U.S.	
Loss	22-2	(Turkey) Sinan Samil Sam	UD	12	2005-02-12	Prenzlauer Berg, Berlin, Germany	WBC International Heavyweight Title.
Win	22-16-1	(United States) Otis Tisdale	TKO	8	2004-10-15	(United States) Eagle Pass, Texas, U.S.	Referee stopped the bout at 2:40 of the eighth round.
Win	24-4-2	(United States) Imamu Mayfield	TKO	5	2004-07-02	(United States) Pala, California, U.S.	IBA Continental Heavyweight Title. Referee stopped the bout at 1:50 of the fifth round.
Win	15-9-2	(United States) Carlton Johnson	KO	3	2003-09-10	(United States) Rochester, New York, U.S.	
Loss	23-3-2	(Cuba) Elieser Castillo	KO	9	2003-06-06	(United States) Uncasville, Connecticut, U.S.	NABF Heavyweight Title.
Win	19-2	(United States) Charles Shufford	UD	10	2003-01-03	(United States) Norman, Oklahoma, U.S.	
Win	18-16-1	(United States) Sedreck Fields	KO	2	2002-10-18	(United States) Buffalo, New York, U.S.	Fields knocked out at 0:42 of the second round.
Win	17-8	(United States) Brian Nix	TKO	3	2002-08-02	(United States) Mashantucket, Connecticut, U.S.	
Win	25-3	(United States) Gary Winmon	TKO	6	2001-10-14	(United States) McAllen, Texas, U.S.	Referee stopped the bout at 0:10 of the sixth round.
Win	9-11-3	(Mexico) Agustin Corpus	UD	8	2001-08-18	(United States) Las Vegas, Nevada, U.S.	
Win	18-2-1	(United States) Ken Murphy	TKO	5	2001-03-17	(United States) Philadelphia, Mississippi, U.S.	Referee stopped the bout at 0:58 of the fifth round.
Loss	18-0	(United States) Clifford Etienne	UD	10	2000-11-11	(United States) Las Vegas, Nevada, U.S.	
Win	22-5	(United States) Mike Williams	TKO	6	2000-09-17	(United States) Detroit, Michigan, U.S.	Referee stopped the bout at 0:35 of the sixth round.
Win	39-3-1	(United States) Robert Daniels	UD	10	2000-01-23	(United States) Venice, Florida, U.S.	
Win	15-0	(United States) Dale Crowe	UD	8	1999-08-28	(United States) Las Vegas, Nevada, U.S.	
Win	20-9	(United States) Abdul Muhaymin	TKO	3	1998-04-17	(United States) Uncasville, Connecticut, U.S.	Referee stopped the bout at 2:23 of the third round.
Win	17-2	(United States) Nate Tubbs	TKO	4	1998-03-27	(United States) Atlantic City, New Jersey, U.S.	Referee stopped the bout at 2:34 of the fourth round.
Win	21-0	(United States) Mario Cawley	TKO	2	1998-01-16	(United States) Atlantic City, New Jersey, U.S.	Referee stopped the bout at 2:32 of the second round.
Win	7-9-2	(United States) Louis Monaco	UD	8	1997-11-18	(United States) Upper Marlboro, Maryland, U.S.	
Win	24-10	(United States) Tony LaRosa	TKO	3	1997-10-03	(United States) Atlantic City, New Jersey, U.S.	
Win	9-0	(United States) Dan Conway	RTD	3	1997-09-23	(United States) Mashantucket, Connecticut, U.S.	Conway retired after the third round.
Win	6-5	(United States) Bryant Smith	TKO	2	1997-08-23	Atlantic City, New Jersey, U.S.	Referee stopped the bout at 2:11 of the second round.
Win	4-1-1	(United States) Jason Farley	KO	2	1997-07-20	(United States) Indio, California, U.S.	
Win	0-1	(United States) Billy McDonald	KO	1	1997-07-05	(United States) Moline, Illinois, U.S.	McDonald knocked out at 0:35 of the first round.

== Personal life ==
He now works as a corrections officer in Connecticut. He is married with 5 children.

Preceded by Lance Whitaker	United States Amateur Super Heavyweight Champion; 1995–1996	Succeeded by Willie Palms
