= Ran Nakash =

Israeli boxer

Ran Nakash רן נקש
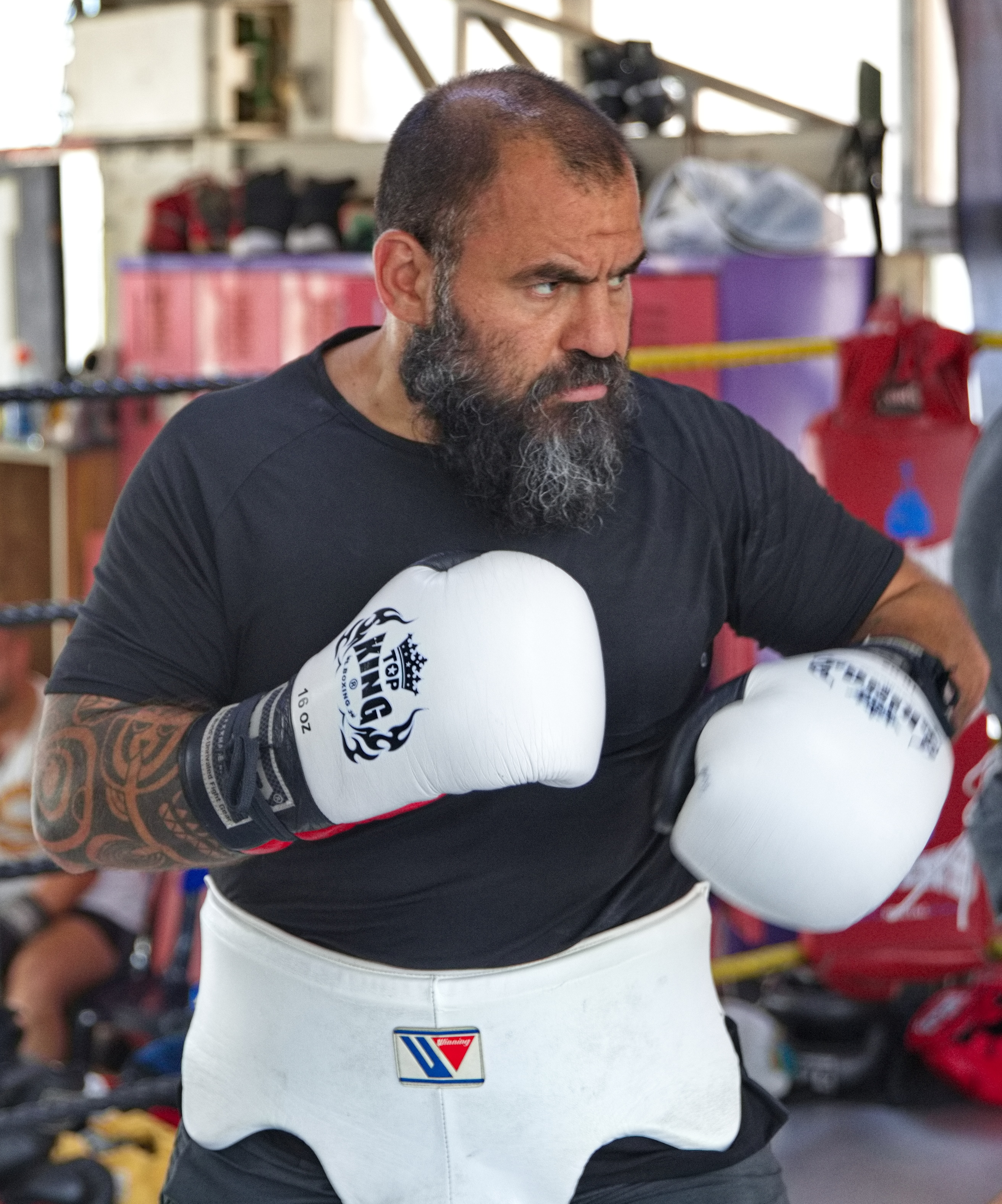

Personal information
- Nickname: Sweet Dreams
- Nationality: Israeli
- Born: July 3, 1978 (age 48) Haifa, Israel
- Height: 178 cm (70 in)
- Weight: Cruiserweight

Boxing career
- Stance: Orthodox

Boxing record
- Total fights: 27
- Wins: 26
- Win by KO: 18
- Losses: 1

Ran Nakash (Hebrew: רן נקש; born 1978) is a retired Israeli professional boxer.

== Professional Boxing Career ==
Nakash competed as a professional boxer from 2006 to 2012. His final professional boxing record is 26-1 (18 KO's). His final match was on January 21, 2012 defeating Derek Bryant by unanimous decision. In 2010 he defeated journeyman American boxer Danny Sheehan by third round stoppage at Nokia Arena in Tel Aviv, Israel. He lost a title match against WBO cruiserweight world champion Marco Huck on April 2, 2011 in Germany. Despite accepting the fight on short notice as a late replacement for Giacobbe Fragomeni, Nakash fought a competitive fight, pressing his opponent throughout the 12-round bout, though Huck was ultimately awarded the victory on points.

== Life After Boxing ==
He is currently Chief Commander and Head Instructor of the Israel Defense Forces Krav Maga Instructional Division Nakash was featured on the Discovery Channel’s Fight Quest where he demonstrated the techniques of the Israeli martial art of Krav Maga.

== Professional boxing record ==
26 Wins (18 knockouts, 8 decisions) 1 Loss (1 decision) Archived August 8, 2013, at the Wayback Machine
Result	Record	Opponent	Type	Round	Date	Location	Notes
Win	26–1	(United States) Derek Bryant	UD	8	January 21, 2012	(United States) Roseland Ballroom, New York City	
Loss	25–1	(Germany) Marco Huck	UD	12	02/04/2011	(Germany) Gerry Weber Stadion, Halle, North Rhine-Westphalia	WBO Cruiserweight Title.
Win	25–0	(United States) Victor Barragan	UD	10	July 14, 2010	(United States) Asylum Arena, Philadelphia, Pennsylvania	
Win	24–0	(United States) Danny Sheehan	TKO	3	April 29, 2010	(Israel) Nokia Arena, Tel Aviv	
Win	23–0	(United States) Richard Stewart	TKO	7	03/04/2010	(United States) Norfolk Scope, Norfolk, Virginia	Referee stopped the bout at 2:23 of the seventh round.
Win	22–0	(Hungary) Attila Makula	KO	2	January 18, 2010	(Israel) Hangar 11, Tel Aviv	
Win	21–0	(United States) Gary Gomez	UD	8	02/10/2009	(United States) The Blue Horizon, Philadelphia, Pennsylvania	
Win	20–0	(Bulgaria) Yavor Marinchev	PTS	10	August 8, 2009	(Israel) Aviv Sport Hall, Ra'anana	
Win	19–0	(United States) William Bailey	TKO	4	11/07/2009	(United States) Prudential Center, Newark, New Jersey	Referee stopped the bout at 1:49 of the fourth round.
Win	18–0	(United States) Dave Brunelli	TKO	7	03/04/2009	(United States) The Blue Horizon, Philadelphia, Pennsylvania	Referee stopped the bout at 1:18 of the seventh round.
Win	17–0	(United States) Ryan Carrol	KO	2	06/02/2009	(United States) The Blue Horizon, Philadelphia, Pennsylvania	
Win	16–0	(United States) Harvey Jolly	TKO	7	05/12/2008	(United States) The Blue Horizon, Philadelphia, Pennsylvania	Referee stopped the bout at 2:18 of the seventh round.
Win	15–0	(United States) Larry Robinson	TKO	1	12/09/2008	(United States) The Blue Horizon, Philadelphia, Pennsylvania	Referee stopped the bout at 0:50 of the first round.
Win	14–0	(Germany) Martin Haag	TKO	4	July 20, 2008	(Germany) Bulldog Open Air Arena, Karlsruhe, Baden-Württemberg	Referee stopped the bout at 1:00 of the fourth round.
Win	13–0	(United States) James Porter	TKO	2	June 6, 2008	(United States) The Blue Horizon, Philadelphia, Pennsylvania	Referee stopped the bout at 0:20 of the second round.
Win	12–0	(Croatia) Asmir Vojnovic	TKO	7	01/03/2008	(Israel) Aviv Sport Hall, Ra'anana	
Win	11–0	(United States) Ray Ruiz	TKO	2	08/02/2008	(United States) The Blue Horizon, Philadelphia, Pennsylvania	Referee stopped the bout at 2:30 of the second round.
Win	10–0	Ibrahim Hariri	KO	?	October 27, 2007	(Israel) Aviv Sport Hall, Ra'anana	
Win	9–0	(United States) Samuel Lee Brown	UD	4	07/09/2007	(United States) The Blue Horizon, Philadelphia, Pennsylvania	
Win	8–0	Machmud Hashb	KO	2	April 28, 2007	(Israel) Aviv Sport Hall, Ra'anana	
Win	7–0	(United States) Robert Murray	UD	4	09/02/2007	(United States) The Blue Horizon, Philadelphia, Pennsylvania	
Win	6–0	Machmud Hashb	TKO	1	January 31, 2007	(Israel) CMA Gym, Tel Aviv	Referee stopped the bout at 1:13 of the first round.
Win	5–0	(Bulgaria) Georgi Buhov	PTS	4	06/01/2007	(Bulgaria) Sofia	
Win	4–0	Elia Ivanov	TKO	2	November 25, 2006	(Israel) Aviv Sport Hall, Ra'anana	
Win	3–0	(United States) Gary Lavender	UD	4	October 13, 2006	(United States) The Blue Horizon, Philadelphia, Pennsylvania	
Win	2–0	Muhamad Taya	TKO	2	June 30, 2006	(Israel) Aviv Sport Hall, Ra'anana	
Win	1–0	Elia Ivanov	TKO	3	June 18, 2006	(Israel) CMA Gym, Tel Aviv	
