= Kevin McBride =

Irish boxer (born 1973)

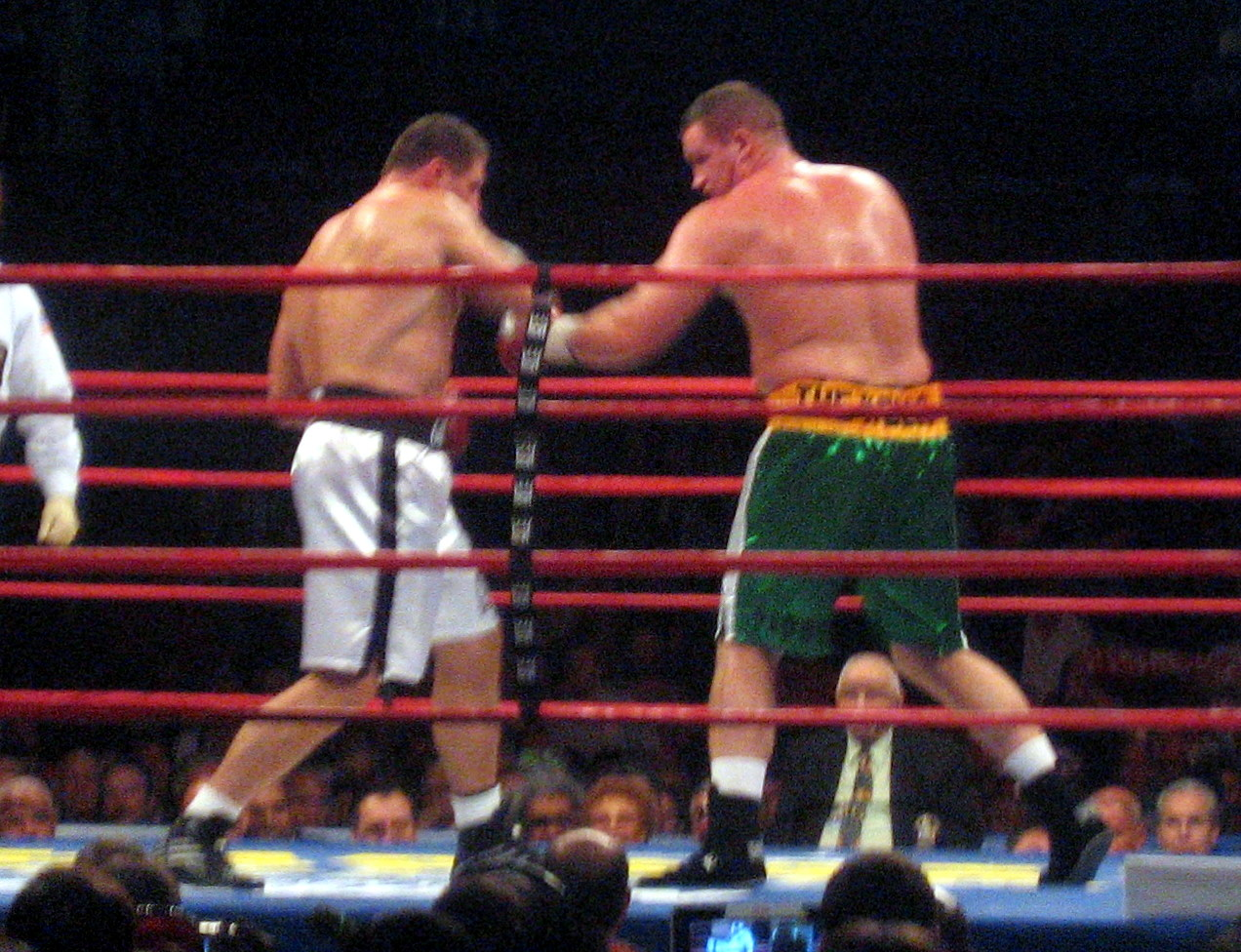
- McBride (right) vs. Andrew Golota, 2007

Personal information
- Nickname: The Clones Collosus
- Born: Kevin Martin McBride; 10 May 1973 (age 53) Clones, County Monaghan, Ireland
- Height: 6 ft 6 in (1.98 m)
- Weight: Heavyweight

Boxing career
- Reach: 80 in (203 cm)
- Stance: Orthodox

Boxing record
- Total fights: 46
- Wins: 35
- Win by KO: 29
- Losses: 10
- Draws: 1

Kevin Martin McBride (born 10 May 1973) is an Irish former professional boxer who competed from 1992 to 2011. At regional level, he held the Irish heavyweight title in 1997. As an amateur, he represented Ireland at the 1992 Olympics. McBride is best known for scoring an upset knockout victory against Mike Tyson in 2005.

== Professional career ==
McBride debuted in December 1992, with a draw against Gary Charlton. In 1997, he defeated Paul Douglas to win the All-Ireland Heavyweight Title, and in 2002 he defeated Craig Tomlinson to add the IBC Americas Heavyweight Title. McBride currently resides in the heavily Irish neighbourhood of Dorchester in Boston and trains in nearby Brockton, Massachusetts.

McBride's career-defining performance was a victory over Mike Tyson, former undisputed world heavyweight champion. Tyson quit the fight at the end of Round 6 by informing the referee that he would not be able to continue to round seven in the MCI Center in Washington, D.C. The aged Tyson explained in a post fight interview that his heart wasn't into the sport anymore. Tyson announced his retirement after the bout, saying "I'm not going to disrespect the sport anymore by losing to this caliber of fighter".

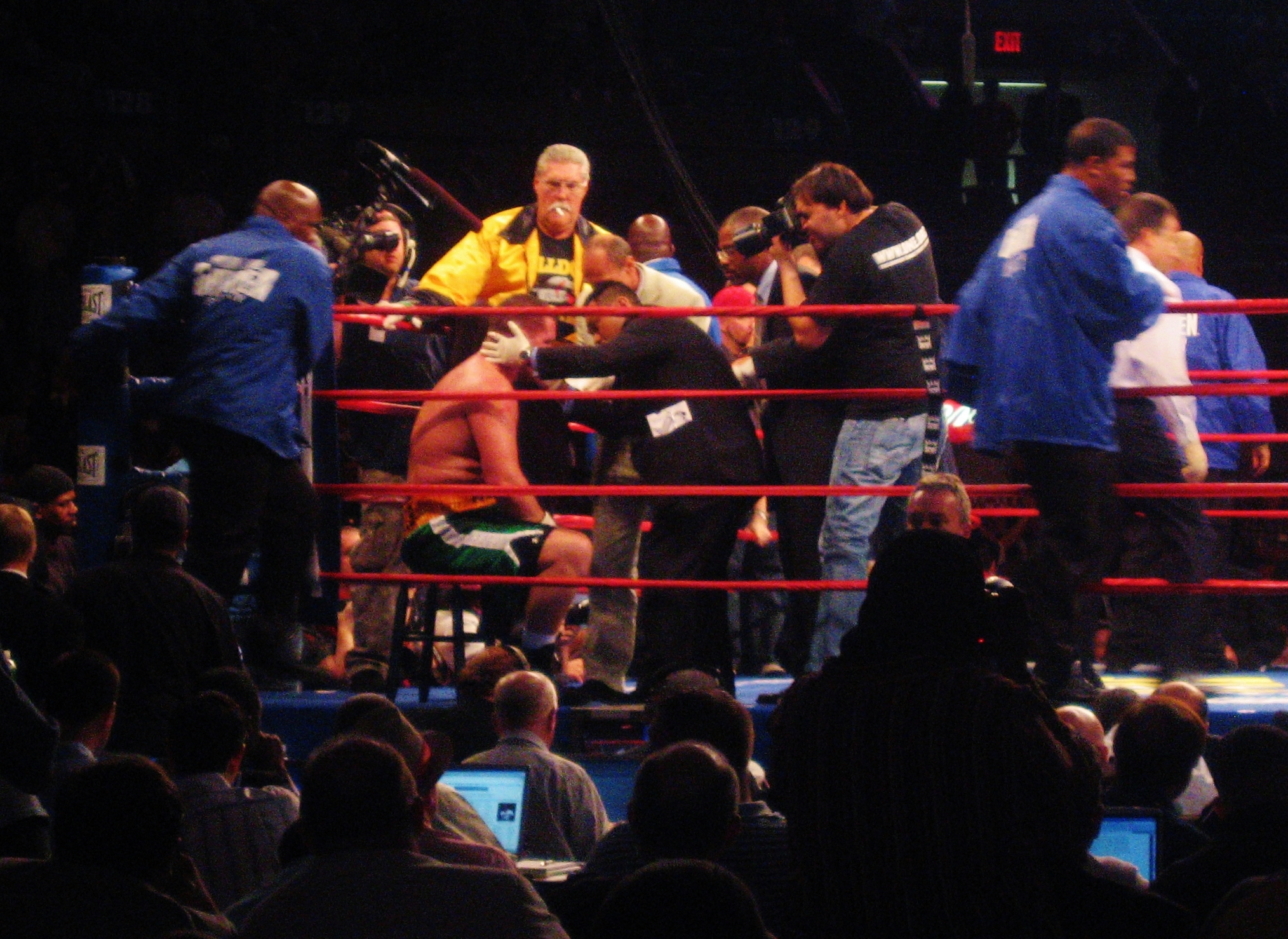
McBride in his corner during the Andrew Golota fight at the Madison Square Garden in October 2007.

McBride has suffered seven losses by knockout—including twice against fighters with losing records. Since his fight with Mike Tyson, McBride beat Byron Polley, then suffered three upset losses. The first loss was against Mike Mollo, a second-round knockout loss. The second loss was against Andrew Golota, a sixth-round technical knockout loss after Golota skilfully worked a cut he had opened up over McBride's eye. After three years inactivity, McBride, the 'Clones Colossus', attempted a comeback in an eight rounder on 10 July 2010 at the Mid-Hudson Civic Center in Poughkeepsie, New York, but lost every round—and the bout—in an upset to cruiserweight veteran Zack Page, a journeyman with a losing record as a professional. Despite standing 6 ft 6 in and weighing 282 pounds to Page's 6 ft 0 in and 205 pounds, McBride was outworked and out punched by his smaller, faster, more aggressive opponent.

On 9 April 2011 McBride fought former cruiserweight and light heavyweight world champion Tomasz Adamek for the IBF International Heavyweight and NABO Heavyweight Championship belts at the Prudential Center in Newark, New Jersey. Adamek won a 12-round unanimous decision.

McBride ended his career after losing to Mariusz Wach on 29 July 2011 during a boxing gala held at Mohegan Sun Casino, Uncasville, Connecticut.

McBride's nickname, "The Clones Colossus", recalls Barry McGuigan's sobriquet "The Clones Cyclone".

== Personal life ==
He is married to Danielle Curran. The couple share two children, a daughter and son.

== Professional boxing record ==
46 fights	35 wins	10 losses
By knockout	29	7
By decision	6	3
Draws	1	

No.	Result	Record	Opponent	Type	Round, time	Date	Location	Notes
46	Loss	35–10–1	Mariusz Wach	KO	4 (12), 2:25	29 Jul 2011	Mohegan Sun, Uncasville, Connecticut, US	For vacant WBC International heavyweight title
45	Loss	35–9–1	Tomasz Adamek	UD	12	9 Apr 2011	Prudential Center, Newark, New Jersey, US	For IBF International and WBO-NABO heavyweight titles
44	Loss	35–8–1	Matt Skelton	UD	3	9 Oct 2010	York Hall, London, England	Prizefighter 14: heavyweight semi-final
43	Win	35–7–1	Franklin Egobi	SD	3	9 Oct 2010	York Hall, London, England	Prizefighter 14: heavyweight quarter-final
42	Loss	34–7–1	Zack Page	UD	8	10 Jul 2010	Mid-Hudson Civic Center, Poughkeepsie, New York, US	
41	Loss	34–6–1	Andrew Golota	TKO	6 (12), 2:42	6 Oct 2007	Madison Square Garden, New York City, New York, US	For vacant IBF North American heavyweight title
40	Loss	34–5–1	Mike Mollo	TKO	2 (12), 0:44	7 Oct 2006	Allstate Arena, Rosemont, Illinois, US	For vacant WBA Fedelatin heavyweight title
39	Win	34–4–1	Byron Polley	TKO	4 (10), 2:28	1 Apr 2006	Wolstein Center, Cleveland, Ohio, US	
38	Win	33–4–1	Mike Tyson	RTD	6 (10), 3:00	11 Jun 2005	MCI Center, Washington, D.C., US	
37	Win	32–4–1	Kevin Montiy	TKO	5 (10), 2:28	18 Mar 2005	Foxwoods Resort, Mashantucket, Connecticut, US	
36	Win	31–4–1	Marcus Rhode	KO	3 (10)	4 Dec 2003	The Roxy, Boston, Massachusetts, US	
35	Win	30–4–1	Lenzie Morgan	KO	1 (10)	9 Aug 2003	The Fairgrounds, Brockton, Massachusetts, US	
34	Win	29–4–1	Najee Shaheed	TKO	9 (12)	17 Mar 2003	The Roxy, Boston, Massachusetts, US	Retained IBC Americas heavyweight title
33	Win	28–4–1	Craig Tomlinson	KO	3 (12), 2:31	25 Oct 2002	Wonderland Ballroom, Revere, Massachusetts, US	Won vacant IBC Americas heavyweight title
32	Win	27–4–1	Reynaldo Minus	KO	3 (10)	26 Jul 2002	The Roxy, Boston, Massachusetts, US	
31	Win	26–4–1	Gary Winmon	TKO	2 (10), 2:42	24 May 2002	Wonderland Ballroom, Revere, Massachusetts, US	
30	Loss	25–4–1	DaVarryl Williamson	TKO	5 (8), 2:48	18 Jan 2002	Paris Las Vegas, Las Vegas, Nevada, US	
29	Win	25–3–1	Rodney McSwain	PTS	10	3 Nov 2001	Little Rock, Arkansas, US	
28	Win	24–3–1	Willie Phillips	PTS	10	11 Aug 2001	Alltel Arena, Little Rock, Arkansas, US	
27	Win	23–3–1	Domingo Monroe	KO	1 (?)	26 Jun 1999	Quincy Armory, Quincy, Massachusetts, US	
26	Loss	22–3–1	Michael Murray	TKO	3 (8), 1:20	11 Apr 1998	Elephant & Castle Centre, London, England	
25	Win	22–2–1	Yuriy Yelistratov	TKO	1 (8), 2:32	22 Nov 1997	Bowlers Exhibition Centre, Manchester, England	
24	Loss	21–2–1	Axel Schulz	TKO	9 (10)	30 Aug 1997	Max-Schmeling-Halle, Berlin, Germany	
23	Win	21–1–1	Paul Douglas	TKO	5 (10), 2:58	2 Jun 1997	Ulster Hall, Belfast, Northern Ireland	Won vacant Irish and Northern Ireland Area heavyweight titles
22	Win	20–1–1	Stoyan Stoyanov	KO	1 (6)	28 Apr 1997	Hull Arena, Hull, England	
21	Loss	19–1–1	Louis Monaco	TKO	5 (6)	7 Feb 1997	Las Vegas Hilton, Winchester, Nevada, US	
20	Win	19–0–1	Tui Toia	TKO	2 (8)	14 Jan 1997	Hale Arena, Kansas City, Missouri, US	
19	Win	18–0–1	Roger McKenzie	TKO	6 (6)	3 Dec 1996	Everton Park Sports Centre, Liverpool, England	
18	Win	17–0–1	Shane Woollas	KO	2 (8)	6 Nov 1996	Hull Arena, Hull, England	
17	Win	16–0–1	Steve Garber	TKO	7 (8), 2:17	2 Jul 1995	Point Theatre, Dublin, Ireland	
16	Win	15–0–1	Atelea Kalhea	KO	1 (6), 0:32	13 May 1995	ARCO Arena, Sacramento, California, US	
15	Win	14–0–1	Jimmy Harrison	TKO	1 (?)	22 Apr 1995	The Roxy, Boston, Massachusetts, US	
14	Win	13–0–1	Carl McGrew	TKO	5 (6), 1:02	4 Mar 1995	The Roxy, Boston, Massachusetts, US	
13	Win	12–0–1	Carl Gaffney	TKO	1 (6), 1:50	7 Feb 1995	Corn Exchange, Suffolk, England	
12	Win	11–0–1	John Lampre	TKO	1 (6)	10 Dec 1994	Cumberland County Civic Center, Portland, Maine, US	
11	Win	10–0–1	Dean Storey	TKO	3 (6)	12 Nov 1994	Point Theatre, Dublin, Ireland	
10	Win	9–0–1	Graham Arnold	TKO	2 (6)	24 Sep 1994	Wembley Arena, London, England	
9	Win	8–0–1	James Truesdale	TKO	3 (?)	26 Aug 1994	The Show Place Arena, Upper Marlboro, Maryland, US	
8	Win	7–0–1	Stanley Wright	UD	6	17 Jun 1994	Trump Taj Mahal, Atlantic City, New Jersey, US	
7	Win	6–0–1	Roger Bryant	TKO	1 (4), 1:12	4 Jun 1994	Reno Hilton, Reno, Nevada, US	
6	Win	5–0–1	Edgar Turpin	TKO	1 (4), 2:02	6 May 1994	Convention Hall, Atlantic City, New Jersey, US	
5	Win	4–0–1	John Harewood	TKO	3 (4)	1 Dec 1993	York Hall, London, England	
4	Win	3–0–1	Chris Coughlan	PTS	4	13 Oct 1993	York Hall, London, England	
3	Win	2–0–1	Joey Paladino	KO	2 (4), 2:32	15 Sep 1993	York Hall, London, England	
2	Win	1–0–1	Gary Williams	PTS	4	13 Feb 1993	Free Trade Hall, Manchester, England	
1	Draw	0–0–1	Gary Charlton	PTS	6	17 Dec 1992	Broadway Theatre, London, England	
