= Clifford Etienne =

American boxer (born 1970)

Personal information
- Nickname: The Black Rhino
- Born: March 9, 1970 (age 56) Lafayette, Louisiana, U.S.
- Height: 6 ft 2 in (188 cm)
- Weight: Heavyweight

Boxing career
- Reach: 74 in (188 cm)
- Stance: Orthodox

Boxing record
- Total fights: 35
- Wins: 29
- Win by KO: 20
- Losses: 4
- Draws: 2

Clifford Etienne (born March 9, 1970) is an American former professional boxer and convicted robber, who is currently serving a 105-year prison sentence without the possibility of parole. Known for his aggressive, high-volume style despite being a heavyweight, he fought Mike Tyson, Francois Botha, Nikolay Valuev, Calvin Brock, and Lamon Brewster.

== Background ==
Born and raised in Louisiana, Etienne was a self-proclaimed "nerd" growing up. He attended St. Martinville High School where he was a standout linebacker, recruited by top colleges such as LSU, Nebraska, Texas A&M, and Oklahoma. This potential college football career was derailed by a 40-year prison sentence for armed robbery, which was committed at a shopping mall during his senior year. While incarcerated, Etienne, who then weighed 290 pounds, took up boxing and won the state prison boxing championship. While in prison he was a member of the "Gunslingers" prison boxing team in Louisiana and reportedly had a 30–0 prison record. He was released on good behavior after serving 10 years. While incarcerated, Etienne enrolled in classes at Southern University, and received high marks for his degree.

== Professional career ==
Upon being paroled from prison in 1998, after serving 10 years for attempted armed robbery, he became a professional boxer; he won 29 matches (20 knockouts), lost 4, and drew 2.

== Rise to the top ==
Etienne was named 2000's "Most Exciting Fighter to Watch" in the heavyweight division by The Ring Magazine, largely the result of his unanimous decision over then-undefeated Lawrence Clay Bey. The fight was widely considered to be one of the best heavyweight matches of that year. He also defeated Lamon Brewster, the future WBO heavyweight champion, via a fairly-dominant unanimous decision after ten rounds in May 2000.

Etienne landed a contract with Showtime and his stock began to rise, but it quickly fell after an upset loss to Fres Oquendo, who stopped Etienne in the eighth round of their fight in March 2001.

After rebuilding some of his lost stature with wins, he was catapulted to the world's stage in a 2003 bout against "Iron" Mike Tyson, where Etienne suffered a first-round knock-out only 49 seconds after being caught with a short right hand from Tyson.

== Decline ==
After the loss to Tyson, Etienne's future seemed to be that of a journeyman opponent. Calvin Brock stopped Etienne in the third round in January 2005.

Etienne's last fight was against Nicolay Valuev. "The Beast from the East", who would go on to become the WBA champion, stopped Etienne in the third round of their fight in Bayreuth, Germany in May 2005.

== Criminal activity and imprisonment ==
On August 11, 2005, Fightnews.com predicted the end of Etienne's ring career when it reported that he had been arrested in Baton Rouge on very serious criminal charges.

The following June 22, he was found guilty at trial and sentenced to 160 years in prison without parole for an allegedly cocaine-fueled crime spree that included robbing a check cashing business, carjacking, and attempting to shoot a police officer. In April 2013, his sentence was reduced from 160 years to 105 years due to a technicality. Etienne is now a painter, painting artwork from prison. He also works as a barber at the same prison.

== Professional boxing record ==
29 Wins (20 knockouts, 9 decisions), 4 Losses (4 knockouts, 0 decisions), 2 Draws
Result	Record	Opponent	Type	Round	Date	Location	Notes
Loss	29–4–2	(Russia) Nikolay Valuev	KO	3 (12)	14/05/2005	Oberfrankenhalle, Bayreuth, Germany	For WBA Inter-Continental heavyweight title. Etienne down twice in round 3rd.
Loss	29–3–2	(United States) Calvin Brock	TKO	3 (10)	21/01/2005	Reliant Center, Houston, Texas, U.S.	Etienne was knocked down once in the 2nd, and twice in the 3rd round.
Win	29–2–2	(United States) Kenny Craven	TKO	2 (10)	27/11/2004	Louisville Gardens, Louisville, Kentucky, U.S.	Etienne down in round 1. Craven was unable to continue due to a cut over his left eye.
Win	28–2–2	(United States) Talmadge Griffis	UD	10	09/06/2004	City Center Pavilion, Reno, Nevada, U.S.	
Win	27–2–2	(Ivory Coast) Onebo Maxime	UD	8	27/05/2004	Alario Center, Westwego, Louisiana, U.S.	
Draw	26–2–2	(Mexico) Gilbert Martinez	PTS	8	27/03/2004	Caesars Tahoe, Stateline, Nevada, U.S.	
Win	26–2–1	(United States) Mike Sheppard	KO	2 (8)	21/02/2004	Chapparells, Akron, Ohio, U.S.	
Win	25–2–1	(United States) Shawn Robinson	TKO	4 (8)	07/02/2004	Riehle Brothers Pavilion, Lafayette, Indiana, U.S.	
Loss	24–2–1	(United States) Mike Tyson	KO	1 (10)	22/02/2003	The Pyramid, Memphis, Tennessee, U.S.	
Draw	24–1–1	(South Africa) Francois Botha	PTS	10	27/07/2002	New Orleans Arena, New Orleans, Louisiana, U.S.	Etienne down in the 5th and 6th rounds.
Win	24–1	(United States) Terrence Lewis	UD	10	27/04/2002	Mohegan Sun Casino, Uncasville, Connecticut, U.S.	
Win	23–1	(United States) Gabe Brown	TKO	7 (10)	02/02/2002	American Airlines Arena, Miami, Florida, U.S.	
Win	22–1	(United States) Dan Ward	TKO	2 (12)	08/12/2001	Grand Casino, Biloxi, Mississippi, U.S.	Won vacant IBA Americas Heavyweight title.
Win	21–1	(United States) Ken Murphy	KO	1 (10)	31/08/2001	Grand Casino, Gulfport, Mississippi, U.S.	
Win	20–1	(United States) Arthur Weathers	KO	1 (10)	22/06/2001	Grand Casino, Gulfport, Mississippi, U.S.	
Loss	19–1	(United States) Fres Oquendo	TKO	8 (10)	23/03/2001	Texas Station Casino, Las Vegas, Nevada, U.S.	Etienne knocked down seven times, all by overhand rights: three times in the 1st round, once in the 2nd, once in the 3rd, once in the 7th and once in the 8th round.
Win	19–0	(United States) Lawrence Clay Bey	UD	10	11/11/2000	Mandalay Bay Resort & Casino, Las Vegas, Nevada, U.S.	Etienne was hurt at the end of the 2nd round and in the 7th round.
Win	18–0	(United States) Cliff Couser	TKO	3 (10)	09/09/2000	Mountaineer Casino Racetrack and Resort, Chester, West Virginia, U.S.	Won vacant NABF Heavyweight title. Title had been vacated by Michael Grant.
Win	17–0	(United States) Joey Guy	KO	3 (12)	30/06/2000	Baton Rouge, Louisiana, U.S.	Won vacant IBA Continental Heavyweight title.
Win	16–0	(United States) Lamon Brewster	UD	10	06/05/2000	Mellon Arena, Pittsburgh, Pennsylvania, U.S.	Lamon Brewster tore his knee ligaments in the 1st.
Win	15–0	(United States) Harold Sconiers	UD	10	18/03/2000	Baton Rouge, Louisiana, U.S.	
Win	14–0	(United States) James Jones	TKO	2 (10)	26/02/2000	Grand Casino, Biloxi, Mississippi, U.S.	Etienne down in the 1st round.
Win	13–0	(United States) Marvin Hunt	TKO	1 (6)	28/01/2000	The Ruins, New Orleans, Louisiana, U.S.	
Win	12–0	(United States) Dan Conway	TKO	1 (4)	26/11/1999	New Orleans Arena, New Orleans, Louisiana, U.S.	
Win	11–0	(United States) Darrell Morgan	TKO	1 (4)	17/09/1999	All American Sports Park, Las Vegas, Nevada, U.S.	
Win	10–0	(United States) Clarence Goins	KO	1	08/09/1999	Treasure Chest Casino, Kenner, Louisiana, U.S.	
Win	9–0	(United States) Abdul Muhaymin	UD	8	20/08/1999	Baton Rouge, Louisiana, U.S.	
Win	8–0	(United States) Eric Jackson	KO	1 (8)	11/06/1999	Casino Magic, Bay St. Louis, Mississippi, U.S.	
Win	7–0	(United States) Ronnie Smith	KO	1	30/04/1999	Marksville, Louisiana, U.S.	
Win	6–0	(United States) Larry Scott	UD	6	15/04/1999	Miccosukee Indian Gaming Resort, Miami, Florida, U.S.	
Win	5–0	(United States) Wesley Martin	TKO	6 (6)	27/02/1999	Baton Rouge, Louisiana, U.S.	
Win	4–0	(United States) Willie Kyles	TKO	1 (6)	06/02/1999	Casino Magic, Bay St. Louis, Mississippi, U.S.	
Win	3–0	(United States) Eddie Richardson	UD	6	19/01/1999	Municipal Auditorium, New Orleans, Louisiana, U.S.	
Win	2–0	(United States) Curt Render	TKO	1 (4)	11/12/1998	Marksville, Louisiana, U.S.	
Win	1–0	(United States) John Randall	KO	1 (4)	03/12/1998	Casino Magic, Bay St. Louis, Mississippi, U.S.	
