= Pinklon Thomas vs. Mike Weaver =

Return of Body & Soul
- Date: June 15, 1985
- Venue: Riviera Hotel & Casino, Winchester, Nevada, U.S.
- Title(s) on the line: WBC heavyweight title

Tale of the tape
Boxer	Pinklon Thomas	Mike Weaver
Nickname	Pinky	Hercules
Hometown	Pontiac, Michigan, U.S.	Diamond Bar, California, U.S.
Purse	$400,000	$300,000
Pre-fight record	25–0–1 (20 KO)	27–10–1 (18 KO)
Age	27 years, 4 months	34 years
Height	6 ft 3 in (191 cm)	6 ft 1 in (185 cm)
Weight	220 1/4 lb (100 kg)	221 1/4 lb (100 kg)
Style	Orthodox	Orthodox
Recognition	WBC; Heavyweight Champion	WBC; No. 1 Ranked Heavyweight

Result
- Thomas wins via 8th-round technical knockout

Pinklon Thomas vs. Mike Weaver, billed as the Return of Body & Soul, was a professional match contested on June 15, 1985, for the WBC heavyweight title.

== Background ==
Pinklon Thomas had defeated WBC heavyweight champion Tim Witherspoon, who was making his first title defense, by majoriry decision to capture the title on August 31, 1984. Originally, promoter Don King had hoped to make David Bey, who defeated fellow heavyweight contender Greg Page on the Witherspoon–Thomas undercard, the first challenger to Thomas' title. The winner of the Thomas–Bey fight would then meet the winner of the planned unification bout between IBF heavyweight champion Larry Holmes and WBA heavyweight champion Gerrie Coetzee with the winner unifying all three major heavyweight title and thus becoming undisputed champion. However, those plans were derailed when the Holmes–Coetzee fight was cancelled due to financial issues.

Instead, in late 1984 King signed former WBA heavyweight champion Mike Weaver, the WBC's number-one ranked heavyweight contender, as Thomas' first opponent as heavyweight champion. King sold the fight to HBO in December alongside a March 1985 Larry Holmes–David Bey IBF heavyweight title fight, but it was not officially announced until April.

Thomas was a 2–1 favorite going into the fight.

== Fight details ==
Thomas got off to a good start in the fight, using his signature jab to bloody Weaver's mouth early in the first round and scoring the first of his two knockdowns in the fight. With less than a minute remaining in the round, Thomas stunned Weaver with an overhand right, which he then followed up with a multiple-punch combination that sent an off-balance Weaver down to his knees, though Weaver quickly got back to his feet and survived the remainder of the round. In the second, Thomas continued to use his jab to bother Weaver, who complained to referee Carlos Padilla Jr. about being thumbed in the eye by after a Thomas jab, increased his lead by taking the round on all three official scorecards. However, Weaver got back into the fight in round three, opening up a cut above Thomas's left eye and staggering Thomas twice during the final minute of the round. Weaver would follow up his big third round by staggering Thomas with a left hand in the opening seconds of the fourth and again winning the round on all three scorecards. Weaver would also win the fifth and six rounds to take the lead on the scorecards before Thomas won the seventh, tying the score on two of the scorecards, while holding a narrow one-point lead on the third. The fight would come to a sudden end midway through the eighth round as Thomas landed a big right hand flush to Weaver's head that put Weaver on the canvas for the second time. Weaver attempted to get back up but stumbled back down to the canvas as he was counted out. Thomas was named the winner by knockout at 1:42 of the eighth round.

== Fight card ==
Confirmed bouts:

Weight Class	Weight		vs.		Method	Round	Notes
Heavyweight	200+ lbs.	Pinklon Thomas (c)	def.	Mike Weaver	TKO	8/12	^{note 1}
Heavyweight	200+ lbs.	Tim Witherspoon (c)	def.	James Smith	UD	12	^{note 2}
Heavyweight	200+ lbs.	Trevor Berbick	def.	David Bey (c)	TKO	11/12	^{note 3}
Light Middleweight	154 lbs.	Horace Shufford	def.	Efren Olivo	UD	10
Middleweight	160 lbs.	Mike McCallum	def.	Marcus Martinez	TKO	2/10
Welterweight	147 lbs.	Louis Howard	def.	Chuck Peralta	TKO	3/6
Heavyweight	200+ lbs.	Rufus Hadley	def.	Hector Fernandez	TKO	6/6

^Note 1 For WBC Heavyweight Title
^Note 2 For NABF Heavyweight Title
^Note 3 For IBF-USBA Heavyweight Title

== Broadcasting ==
Country	Broadcaster
United States	HBO

Preceded by vs. Tim Witherspoon	Pinklon Thomas's bouts June 15, 1985	Succeeded by vs. Trevor Berbick
Preceded by vs. Tony Anthony	Mike Weaver's bouts June 15, 1985	Succeeded by vs. Carl Williams
