= Trevor Berbick vs. Mike Tyson =

Boxing match

Judgment Day
- Date: November 22, 1986
- Venue: Las Vegas Hilton, Winchester, Nevada, U.S.
- Title(s) on the line: WBC heavyweight title

Tale of the tape
Boxer	Trevor Berbick	Mike Tyson
Nickname		Kid Dynamite
Hometown	Norwich, Port Antonio, Jamaica	Catskill, New York, U.S.
Purse	$2,100,000	$1,500,000
Pre-fight record	31–4–1 (23 KO)	27–0 (25 KO)
Age	32 years, 3 months	20 years, 4 months
Height	6 ft 2 1/2 in (189 cm)	5 ft 10 in (178 cm)
Weight	218 1/2 lb (99 kg)	221 1/4 lb (100 kg)
Style	Orthodox	Orthodox
Recognition	WBC; Heavyweight Champion; The Ring; No. 1 Ranked Heavyweight	WBA/WBC; No. 1 Ranked Heavyweight; The Ring; No. 7 Ranked Heavyweight

Result
- Tyson wins via 2nd-round TKO

Trevor Berbick vs. Mike Tyson, billed as Judgment Day, was a professional boxing match contested on November 22, 1986 for the WBC heavyweight championship.

== Background ==
In 1986, the three major boxing organizations, the World Boxing Council (WBC), the World Boxing Association (WBA) and the International Boxing Federation (IBF) teamed with pay television channel Home Box Office (HBO) to create a heavyweight championship tournament in an effort to crown the first Undisputed Heavyweight Champion since Leon Spinks in 1978. All three of the organizations' heavyweight champions, as well as several of the sport's top contenders, were entered into the tournament. In the first leg of the tournament, Trevor Berbick met then-WBC champion Pinklon Thomas for the WBC portion of the heavyweight title. In a closely contested fight, Berbick was able to narrowly earn the victory by unanimous decision to capture his first major heavyweight title. However, his first defense of that title would come against the 20-year-old undefeated sensation Mike Tyson, who was 27–0 with 25 of his victories coming by way of knockout. Tyson had gone 12–0 in the year of 1986 alone and officially qualified for the unification series with a second-round knockout victory over Alfonso Ratliff in September. Though the 32–year old Berbick entered the fight as the champion, he was installed as a 3–1 underdog to Tyson, who, at 20 years old, was 12 years younger than Berbick and trying to surpass Floyd Patterson as the youngest man to win a major Heavyweight title in the history of the sport.

== Fight ==
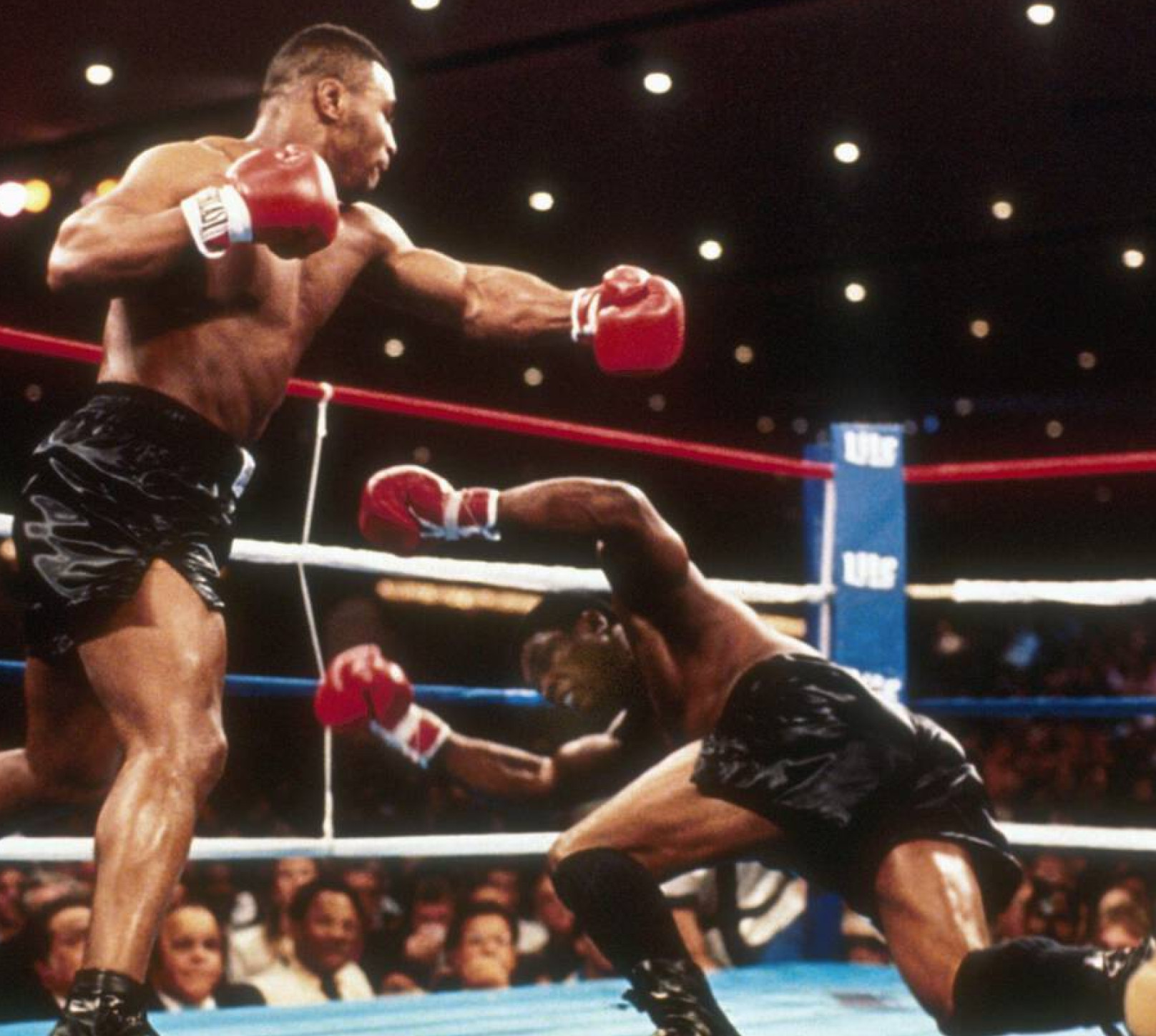

Tyson dominated Berbick, easily picking up the victory by way of second-round technical knockout. From the opening bell, Tyson was the aggressor, hammering Berbick with several powerful punches. Towards the end of the round, Tyson hit Berbick with a four-punch combination that sent Berbick across the ring. Berbick managed to stay on his feet, but Tyson continued to attack, hitting Berbick several more times until the bell sounded. Tyson picked up right where he left off in round 2, almost immediately hitting Berbick with a combination that dropped the champion. Berbick was able to answer the referee's count and the fight continued. Berbick, however, was unable to mount any offense. Tyson finally ended the fight at the 2:35 mark, hitting Berbick with a right to the body followed by a left hook to the head that dropped his opponent for the second time. Berbick attempted to get up twice, only to collapse both times, causing referee Mills Lane to call the fight and award Tyson the victory via knockout.

== Aftermath ==
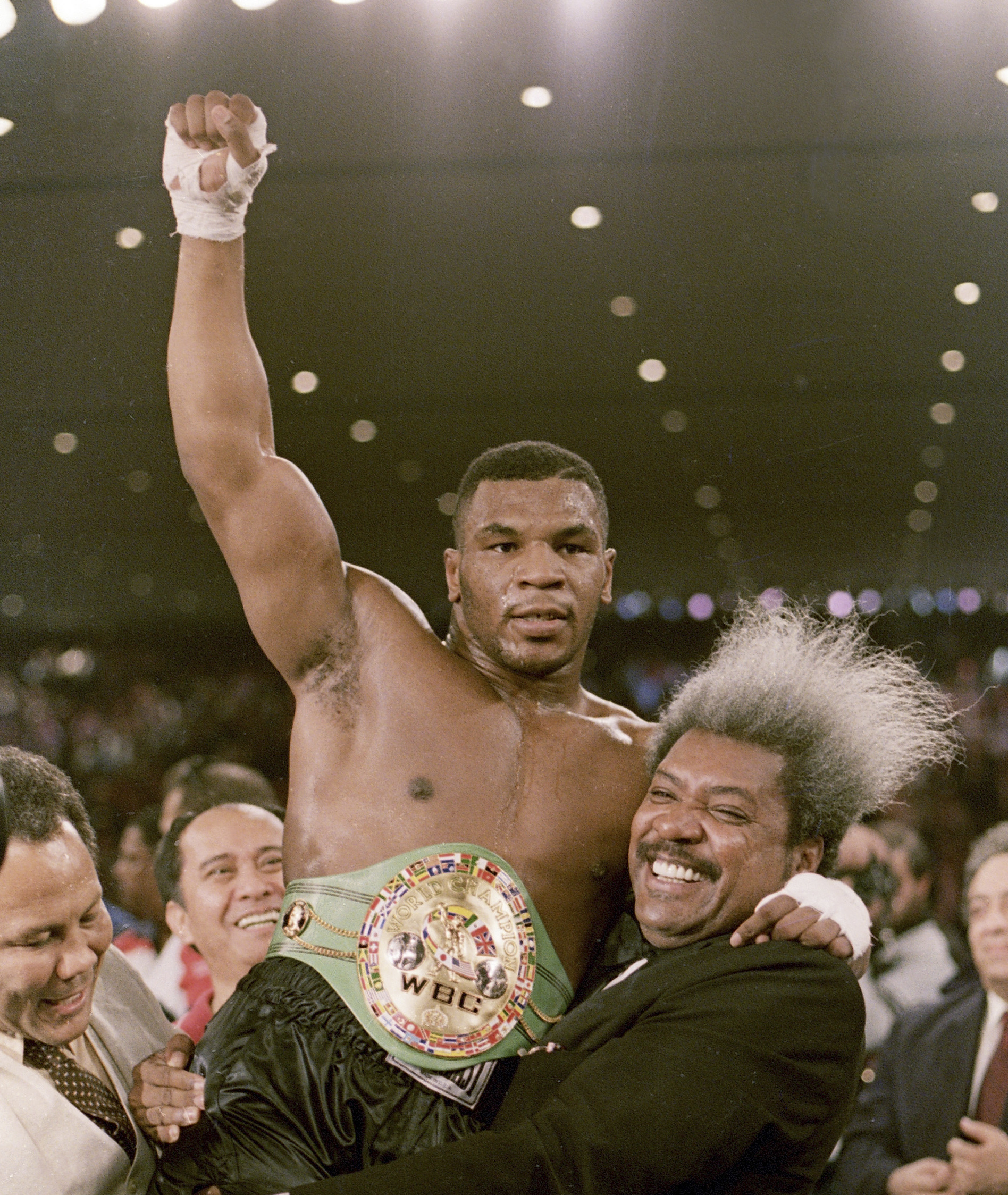
Tyson and Don King after the match

Berbick would continue to fight into the year 2000, but was unable to match his previous success, never again fighting for the Heavyweight championship.

Tyson, meanwhile, would continue his dominance through the rest of the decade, next defeating James "Bonecrusher" Smith to win the WBA Heavyweight title. After defeating former champ Pinklon Thomas to retain his two titles, Tyson would meet IBF Heavyweight champion Tony Tucker in a match that would unify all three major heavyweight titles, a match Tyson would win via unanimous decision to become the Undisputed Heavyweight champion.

This fight was mentioned in the animated TV series Mike Tyson Mysteries episode "Ultimate Judgment Day" from 2014. In the episode Mike Tyson says Trevor Berbick wanted to call their 1986 fight 'Ultimate Judgment Day', but then the ghost of Berbick appears to correct Tyson, saying that actually Tyson was the boxer that wanted to call it 'Ultimate Judgment Day. He then says, "Rest in Peace, Trevor Berbick!" while waving his hand to make the ghost of Trevor Berbick disappear.

== Undercard ==
Confirmed bouts:

- Pinklon Thomas knocks out William Hosea at 1:10 of Round 7
- Matthew Hilton knocks out Franklin Owens at 1:23 of Round 2
- Greg Page knocks out Wimpy Halstead at 1:38 of Round 8

== Broadcasting ==
Country	Broadcaster
United Kingdom	ITV
United States	HBO

Preceded by vs. Pinklon Thomas	Trevor Berbick's bouts November 22, 1986	Succeeded by vs. Art Terry
Preceded by vs. Alfonso Ratliff	Mike Tyson's bouts November 22, 1986	Succeeded by vs. James Smith
