= Shane Sutcliffe =

Canadian boxer

Personal information
- Nickname: Kid Thunder
- Nationality: Canadian
- Born: June 17, 1975 (age 51) Victoria, British Columbia, Canada
- Height: 6 ft 2 in (188 cm)
- Weight: Heavyweight

Boxing career
- Stance: Orthodox

Boxing record
- Total fights: 40
- Wins: 25
- Win by KO: 15
- Losses: 14
- Draws: 1

Shane Sutcliffe (born June 17, 1975) is a Canadian former professional boxer who competed from 1992 to 2004. He is referred to as "Kid Thunder" by his fans.

== Career ==
Sutcliffe was born in Victoria, British Columbia, Canada and raised in Regina, Saskatchewan, before moving to Nanaimo, British Columbia at age 12. He had no formal amateur boxing career; after winning 22 "Toughman Contests" in Canada, he made his professional boxing debut in 1992 at the age of 17. His first fight resulted in a sixth-round decision victory over Joe Wade. Shortly afterward he moved to Los Angeles, California and eventually Las Vegas, Nevada, to train with the legendary Eddie Futch. He won other fights by unexpected margins, including a 3-round defeat of Ray Phillips

In 1997, Sutcliffe moved to and fought out of Montreal, Quebec, after signing a contract with International Boxing Management Interbox. On April 3, 1998, he defeated Ben Perlini via sixth round knockout to win the Canadian Heavyweight championship. In his third defense of the title on February 5, 1999, Sutcliffe lost via 12th-round TKO to former World titleholder Trevor Berbick in Montreal. His contract was then dropped by Interbox as a result. He challenged Berbick again for the title on May 26, 2000, in Vancouver. However, he dropped a close 12 round unanimous decision in that contest.

Sutcliffe took over 2 years off from boxing to start a family after losing to fellow Canadian Patrice L'Heureux on November 30, 2001. After the birth of his son, Sutcliffe worked construction to provide a steadier source of income for his new family. However, he returned to the sport in 2004, dropping decisions to Wesley Martin and Louis Monaco.

Sutcliffe is what is termed a journeyman fighter, one who "journeys" to a variety of places (often on short notice) to provide relatively easy competition for up-and-coming prospects or fading former champions. He counted Tyrell Biggs, Leon Spinks, Trevor Berbick, Oleg Maskaev, Brian Nielsen, and David Tua among the opponents he faced. As of the beginning of 2006, his ring record stands at 25 wins (15 knockouts), 14 losses, and one draw in 40 professional contests.

== Professional boxing record ==
25 Wins (15 knockouts, 10 decisions), 14 Losses (5 knockouts, 9 decisions), 1 Draw
Result	Opp; Record	Opponent	Type	Round	Date	Location	Notes
Loss	12-27-4	(United States) Louis Monaco	UD	10	24/04/2004	(United States) Billings, Montana, U.S.	Canadian American Mexican Heavyweight Title.
Loss	14-43-8	(United States) Wesley Martin	SD	4	07/02/2004	(United States) Rochester, Washington, U.S.	
Loss	4-0	(Canada) Patrice L'Heureux	UD	6	30/11/2001	Montreal, Quebec, Canada	
Win	29-11-1	(United States) Donnell Wingfield	TKO	2	12/10/2001	(United States) Niagara Falls, New York, U.S.	Referee stopped the fight at 2:15 of the second round.
Win	3-11	(Canada) Marcelo Aravena	TKO	4	24/05/2001	Victoria, British Columbia, Canada	
Win	5-0	(United States) Cody Gray	MD	6	28/04/2001	(United States) Tacoma, Washington, U.S.	
Loss	48-11-1	(Canada) Trevor Berbick	UD	12	26/05/2000	Vancouver, British Columbia, Canada	Canada Heavyweight Title.
Loss	14-39	(United States) Tim Knight	UD	6	19/01/2000	(United States) Louisville, Kentucky, U.S.	
Loss	34-1	(New Zealand) David Tua	TKO	2	23/10/1999	(United States) Las Vegas, Nevada, U.S.	Referee stopped the fight at 1:20 of the second round.
Loss	49-1	(Denmark) Brian Nielsen	KO	5	03/09/1999	Copenhagen, Denmark	Nielsen was knocked out at 2:40 of the fifth round.
Loss	16-2	(Uzbekistan) Oleg Maskaev	TKO	2	20/05/1999	(United States) Tunica, Mississippi, U.S.	PABA Heavyweight Title. Referee stopped the fight at 2:56 of the second round.
Loss	46-10-1	(Canada) Trevor Berbick	TKO	12	05/02/1999	Montreal, Quebec, Canada	Canada Heavyweight Title. Referee stopped the fight at 0:44 of the 12th round.
Win	20-3-2	(United States) Gerard Jones	UD	8	06/11/1998	Montreal, Quebec, Canada	
Win	5-2-1	(Canada) Patrick Graham	TKO	2	24/09/1998	Montreal, Quebec, Canada	Canada Heavyweight Title. Referee stopped the fight at 0:40 of the second round.
Win	3-2	(Canada) Ben Perlini	KO	6	03/04/1998	Montreal, Quebec, Canada	Canada Heavyweight Title. Perlini knocked out at 1:59 of the sixth round.
Win	3-8-1	(Canada) Don Laliberte	KO	2	11/11/1997	Montreal, Quebec, Canada	Laliberte knocked out at 2:53 of the second round.
Win	2-2	(Canada) Ritchie Goosehead	DQ	3	12/12/1996	Vancouver, British Columbia, Canada	
Win	--	(Canada) Mike Curry	KO	1	19/10/1996	Nanaimo, British Columbia, Canada	
Loss	26-13-2	(United States) Dale Grant	UD	10	03/07/1996	(United States) Anacortes, Washington, U.S.	
Win	2-4	(United States) Anthony Moore	UD	8	11/04/1996	Vancouver, British Columbia, Canada	
Loss	20-10-2	(United States) Jason Waller	UD	10	01/03/1996	(United States) Honolulu, Hawaii, U.S.	
Draw	6-14-1	(United States) Krishna Wainwright	PTS	10	02/02/1996	(United States) Kent, Washington, U.S.	
Win	14-6	(United States) Marcellus Brown	TKO	8	27/08/1995	(United States) Anacortes, Washington, U.S.	Referee stopped the bout at 1:58 of the eighth round.
Win	3-3-2	(United States) Wesley Martin	PTS	8	09/08/1995	(United States) Woodland Hills, California, U.S.	
Win	6-18	(United States) Steve Cortez	KO	2	23/06/1995	Cloverdale, British Columbia, Canada	
Win	21-21-2	(Canada) Conroy Nelson	KO	1	23/05/1995	Nanaimo, British Columbia, Canada	Nelson knocked out at 1:27 of the first round.
Loss	5-6-2	(United States) John Kiser	MD	8	27/10/1994	Etobicoke, Ontario, Canada	
Win	25-14-3	(Canada) Leon Spinks	UD	8	01/10/1994	Nanaimo, British Columbia, Canada	
Win	1-0-1	(Canada) Darryl Gray	TKO	3	22/04/1994	Nanaimo, British Columbia, Canada	
Win	15-1	(United States) Paul Phillips	DQ	3	03/12/1993	(United States) Bay Saint Louis, Mississippi, U.S.	Phillips was disqualified for spitting out his mouthpiece repeatedly.
Loss	25-6	(United States) Tyrell Biggs	TKO	2	03/12/1993	(United States) Bay Saint Louis, Mississippi, U.S.	
Win	9-8-2	(United States) Matthew Brooks	PTS	6	06/11/1993	Victoria, British Columbia, Canada	
Win	1-3	(United States) Antonio Ocasio	TKO	2	21/08/1993	(United States) Kalispell, Montana, U.S.	Referee stopped the bout at 2:33 of the second round.
Win	--	(United States) Mark Frieon	TKO	1	13/08/1993	Cloverdale, British Columbia, Canada	
Win	0-3	(United States) Fred Peppers	KO	2	30/07/1993	Cloverdale, British Columbia, Canada	
Win	0-1	(United States) Lavell Sims	TKO	2	21/11/1992	Nanaimo, British Columbia, Canada	Referee stopped the fight at 1:17 of the second round.
Loss	0-1	(United States) John Kiser	SD	4	28/10/1992	(United States) Missoula, Montana, U.S.	
Win	3-8-1	(United States) Mike Smith	KO	2	18/09/1992	(United States) Bozeman, Montana, U.S.	
Win	1-0	(United States) Paul Pressley	PTS	4	06/08/1992	(United States) Miles City, Montana, U.S.	
Win	6-9	(Canada) Joe Wade	UD	6	08/07/1992	New Westminster, British Columbia, Canada	
