= Patrick Graham (boxer) =

Canadian boxer (born 1969)

Personal information
- Nickname: The Shamrock
- Born: Patrick John Graham; October 3, 1969 (age 56) Calgary, Alberta, Canada
- Weight: Heavyweight

Boxing career
- Reach: 77 in (196 cm)
- Stance: Orthodox

Boxing record
- Total fights: 17
- Wins: 8
- Win by KO: 6
- Losses: 8
- Draws: 1
- No contests: 0

Patrick Graham (born October 3, 1969) is a Canadian former professional boxer. While not known for his technical skill, he was known for his toughness, strength, and durability. His boxing idol was George Chuvalo. Although he did not have Chuvalo's durability, Graham showed resilience, and the ability to compete in the sport.

== Record ==
Number	Date	Result	Round	Method	Opponent	Nationality	Note
1	January 26, 1995	Win	4	UD	Ritchie Goosehead	Canadian	@ Edmonton, Alberta, Canada
2	August 14, 1995	Loss	4	MD	Don Laliberte	Canadian	@ Edmonton, Alberta, Canada
3	November 6, 1995	Win	2	TKO	Ben Perlini	Canadian	@ Edmonton, Alberta, Canada
4	January 25, 1996	Draw	6	PTS	Kirby Russell	Canadian	@ Edmonton, Alberta, Canada
5	October 23, 1996	Win	4	TKO	Rich Maciel	American	@ Edmonton, Alberta, Canada
6	January 22, 1997	Loss	4	TKO	Troy Roberts	Canadian	@ Edmonton, Alberta, Canada
7	October 16, 1997	Win	5	TKO	Ritchie Goosehead	Canadian	@ Edmonton, Alberta, Canada
8	August 6, 1998	Win	3	TKO	Marcelo Aravena	Canadian	@ Slave Lake, Alberta, Canada
9	September 24, 1998	Loss	2	TKO	Shane Sutcliffe	Canadian	Canadian Heavyweight Title @ Montreal, Quebec, Canada
10	February 13, 1999	Loss	3	TKO	Eric Esch	American	IBA SuperHeavy Weight Title @ Las Vegas, NV, U.S.
11	April 8, 1999	Loss	1	TKO	Ritchie Goosehead	Canadian	Graham tore his left Bicep tendon @ Regina, Saskatchewan, Canada
12	November 11, 1999	Win	6	KO	Ritchie Goosehead	Canadian	@ Prince George, British Columbia, Canada
