= Kitione Lave =

Tongan boxer (1934-2006)

Personal information
- Nicknames: Tongan Torpedo; Tongan Terror
- Nationality: Tongan
- Born: Lavemai Kitione Takitau; 16 April 1934 Hunga, Tonga
- Died: 2 June 2006 (aged 72) Beach Haven, New Zealand
- Weight: Heavyweight

Boxing career
- Stance: Orthodox

Boxing record
- Total fights: 72
- Wins: 51
- Win by KO: 43
- Losses: 18
- Draws: 2
- No contests: 0

Kitione Takitau Lavemai (16 April 1934 – 2 June 2006), who fought under the name Kitione Lave, was a Tongan heavyweight boxer from the island of Hunga, Vava'u and Kotu, Ha'apai. At the age of 18 he became the South Pacific heavyweight champion and in 1956 he, unsuccessfully, challenged Joe Bygraves for the vacant Commonwealth title. A heavy hitting fighter, with the vast majority of his victories ending in knockouts, he was known as The Tongan Torpedo. After retiring from boxing he had a brief career as a professional wrestler.

== Personal history ==
Lave was born in the island of Hunga, Vava'u, Tonga in 1934. In 1953 he travelled to New Zealand and set himself up in Auckland. As well as fighting professionally, Lave also found work as a gardener at the Auckland residence of Queen Sālote Tupou III. In 1955 his boxing took him to Great Britain, where he met school teacher Patricia Gee. The two were married in 1957 and they had one daughter, also Patricia. While in Britain Lave joined the Royal Air Force, and served for some time in Singapore. After retiring from boxing, whilst in Britain and Singapore, he took up professional wrestling. Once he had completed his time with the RAF, Lave became a successful nightclub owner running an establishment in Sheffield. He and Patricia moved to New Zealand in 1971 where he attempted to run a casino, but with little success. Lave died after a long illness at a rest home in Beach Haven in 2006.

== Boxing career ==
=== Early career ===
Kitione Lave began his boxing career as a teenager on the island of Vava'u, Tonga. His first recorded fight took place on Vava'u where, at the age of 16, he won a three round fight on points. By February 1952 Lave had seven fights under his belt, having lost only one. He then moved to Fiji, where in August 1952 he beat Semi Galoa with a last round knockout. After two more successful bouts, Lave was matched against Fijian Miliano for the South Pacific heavyweight title. The contest took place on 7 March 1953 in the town of Ba and was scheduled for 12 rounds. Lave knocked out his opponent in the fifth round to take his first belt. He defended this title on 13 April 1953 in Fiji through another knockout victory in the second round against Inoke Davu.

In June 1953 Lave travelled to New Zealand on the steamship Tofua. Within a month he was boxing at the Town Hall in Auckland and quickly became a regular fighter at the venue. Described as a "boxing promoter's dream drawcard", Lave was young, good looking and was able to knockout opponents with either hand, and in his first three months in Auckland he fought six times, winning all of them within the distance. The last of these six fights was against Don Mullett, the New Zealand heavyweight champion, who he stopped in the seventh round through a cut eye. This string of wins brought Lave to the public's attention and he was summoned to meet with Queen Sālote, who wished to advise him on his role as a cultural ambassador for Tonga. Three months later a rematch was arranged between Lave and Mullett and the two men met at the Race Course in Stratford. This time the match lasted until the tenth, when Lave knocked out his opponent.

A month later, Lave was matched with experienced English fighter Ken Brady, who had also beaten Mullett earlier in the year. The contest, held at the Western Springs Stadium, would turn out to be Lave's first defeat in New Zealand, with Brady taking the fight on points after the fight went the full distance. Despite the defeat, Lave's career continued to flourish and he let New Zealand for Australia. Lave continued to be matched against top opponents, and his very next fight was against Australian Allen Williams, the New South Wales State Heavyweight Champion. Held at Leichhardt Stadium in Sydney, Williams entered the fight on a nine match unbeaten run. Lave failed to be overwhelmed by his opponent and stopped the future Australian champion in the eighth round. After stopping an inexperienced Paul Butler in April he was rematched with Williams. Williams fared no better the second time around, being knocked out again in the eighth round. In September 1954 Lave travelled to Melbourne to face Brady for a second time. Again the Englishman had the advantage and Lave was knocked out for the first time in his career. A second rematch was quickly arranged and two days before Christmas Lave and Brady travelled to New Zealand to fight at Carlaw Park in Auckland. Lave finally managed to get his revenge, knocking Brady out in the final round of a twelve round contest. Lave was back in Australia at the start of 1955, and in January he beat Ross Jenkins in Sydney following this with a win over Steve Zoranich in Perth. Then in April he was again lined up to fight Allen Williams. The contest, held at Broken Hill Stadium went the distance, with Lave taking the decision.

=== Move to Britain ===
While in New Zealand Lave had made contact with former British boxer Bruce Woodcock, who suggested that Lave come to Britain. In 1955 Lave travelled to England to continue his career, under the management of Woodcock, where he was dubbed The Tongan Terror. He was given a baptism of fire when his first opponent being Commonwealth Heavyweight champion Johnny Williams. It was an inauspicious start to his European career as Lave was stopped via a technical knockout in the first round. Lave followed this fight with a contest against up and coming title challenger from Tyne and Wear, Manuel Burgo. Despite an unbeaten career of eight fights, Burgo was stopped after just 71 seconds of the first round against the heavy hitting Tongan. Three weeks later Lave beat Eddie Hearn, before resting for seven days to travel to Birmingham to face the dangerous Jamaican Joe Bygraves. Lave started the fight well, but Bygraves slowly took control of the fight and took the points decision after the eight round contest came to an end. He followed the defeat with a victory over Fred "Nosher" Powell in Lave's first match in London. He ended the year in defeat, this time to former European Boxing champion Jack Gardner. The result was met with derision by the British Press, as Lave not only put Gardner down for the first time in his career, but also did enough throughout the match to take the decision.

Lave began 1956 in better form, winning three consecutive fights. Travelling to Newcastle, he stopped undefeated German Hans Brendemuehl in the second, former and future Italian heavyweight champion Uber Bacilieri in the fourth before scoring a second round victory over ex-Commonwealth and European champion Don Cockell. Cockell retired after his contest with Lave, having just a year earlier faced Rocky Marciano for the World Heavyweight title. Lave's successes led to a title challenge for the vacant Commonwealth heavyweight title. His opponent was Joe Bygraves, who had defeated Lave in 1955. The two met on the 26 June 1956 at the Empire Pool in Wembley, and again the fight went the full distance, with the result going the same way, to Bygraves. Lave ended the year with a win over American Young Harry Wills at the ice rink in Nottingham, before travelling to Germany to knockout Guenter Nurnberg in the first round in an encounter in Berlin. Lave fought infrequently in 1957, with just three matches, all of them ending in defeat. The first of the loses was against Brian London in an eliminator contest for another shot at the Commonwealth title. This was followed by a third defeat to Bygraves, yet another points decision, and finally a loss against German heavyweight title challenger Hans Friedrich.

=== Career end ===
Lave left Britain in 1958 and returned to the Southern hemisphere. He fought just once that year, losing to American Mormon missionary, Chuck Woodworth at Carlaw Park in Auckland. In 1959 he travelled to Fiji, where he fought seven bouts within two months. He won six of them through knockouts, but he lost his South Seas Heavyweight title to Mosese Varasikete after suffering a technical knockout in the first round. In May he was back in Tonga, there he fought five times against local opponents, winning all within distance. He then returned to Fiji, where on 25 August he regained his South Seas belt by defeating Mosese Varasikete in a first round knockout display. He fought twice in September, both third round stoppages, before heading to French Polynesia where he dispatched Sakiusa Cawaru in the final round of a ten round contest. In October he was back in Fiji, facing Varasikete in a third challenge for the South Seas Heavyweight title. the belt changed hands again with Varasikete taking the referee's decision after the match went the full twelve rounds. Lave ended the year back in Europe, facing the European champion Franco Cavicchi in Bologna, Italy. Lave took Cavicchi the distance but again lost on points.

In 1960, Lave was back in Great Britain, but his best was behind him. His first fight back in England ended in controversy after the referee stopped the match against Joey Armstrong in the fifth, declaring neither boxer was 'giving their best'. Just a week later Lave was back in the ring, stopping Jim Cooper, the twin brother of heavyweight champion Henry Cooper, in the sixth. In March he returned to Bologna where he achieved a rare points decision over Federico Friso. He ended 1960 with a win over former ABA champion Dave Rent, before losing to both Ulli Nitzschke in Germany and Tony Smith back in England. In 1961 he fought just once, in an ill-advised trip to America, where he fought World title challenger Tom McNeeley. McNeeley stopped Lave in the third.

Lave fought only twice more, both in 1963 when he was stationed in Singapore with the RAF. He won both fights, against Australian Tony Vickers and Fijian heavyweight champion Isimeli Radrodro.

In 2007, a year after his death, Lave was inducted at the inaugural Tongan Sporting Hall of Fame.

== Wrestling career ==
With his boxing career behind him, Lave found employment in professional wrestling. He wrestled in Sheffield where he owned his night club, and while in Singapore he was managed by Emile Czaja, fighting alongside the likes of Prince Kumali.
