= Bobby Halpern =

American boxer (1933–2015)

Personal information
- Nickname: The Hebrew Hammer
- Nationality: (United States)
- Born: Robert Halpern; April 25, 1933 New York, New York
- Died: February 8, 2015
- Height: 5 ft 10 in (178 cm)
- Weight: Heavyweight

Boxing career
- Stance: Southpaw

Boxing record
- Wins: 10
- Win by KO: 7
- Losses: 4
- Draws: 0
- No contests: 0

Bobby Halpern (April 25, 1933 – February 8, 2015) was an American heavyweight boxer.

== Early life ==
Halpern's exact date of birth is unknown, but is suspected to be either April 25, 1933, May 31, 1931 or March 31, 1933. Boxrec lists Halpern's birthdate as April 25, 1933. He grew up in on Arthur Avenue in the Bronx, New York. His mother was Irish Catholic and his father was Jewish. Halpern joined a street gang and was involved in street fights and gang brawls. After being in and out of trouble, Halpern discovered a local gym and started to train to become an amateur boxer. After racking up a notable winning streak, Halpern, then 15, entered and won the 1948 New Jersey Diamond Gloves. Over the next five years, he compiled a record of 200 wins and 10 defeats. Halpern's boxing career was sidetracked by criminal activities.

At 20, he was convicted of armed robbery and served a 4-year prison term. While serving his term, he read the autobiography of heavyweight boxer Floyd Patterson, Victory Over Myself, and decided to become a professional boxer. After being released from prison, he became a professional boxer in 1958, and won two fights to earn a match with undefeated heavyweight prospect Tom McNeeley on December 19, 1958 in New York. Halpern lost the fight by decision. At the age of 25, Halpern was convicted of robbery, assault, and kidnapping, and sentenced to 20 years to life. He was released from prison in 1975 at the age of 42, after serving 17 years. He earned the nickname, "The Hebrew Hammer" in his first comeback fight on November 10, 1976, after he knocked out 260 pound Terry Lee Kidd with one punch. However, 14 days later, Halpern was knocked out in two rounds by future World Heavyweight Champion Trevor Berbick. Halpern racked seven consecutive victories, 6 by knockout. His knockouts over Freddy McKay (KO 3) and "Diego" Joe Roberson (KO 7) were featured in Sports Illustrated.

Outside of the ring, Halpern displayed a bad temper. He was accused of domestic violence by Antonia Maria Melendez, his girlfriend. She accused him knocking out 6 of her teeth and breaking her leg. The case against Halpern was dismissed on May 1, 1978, when Melendez failed to show up to court. Madison Square Garden (MSG) billed Halpern in their main-event on May 15, 1978 in New York City. He suffered a one punch knockout defeat in the third round. Halpern fought two exhibitions and was scheduled for a 10 round fight against Dave Dittmore in June.

While shopping for clothes at a Bronx store, two men, one armed with a shotgun and the other with a .38 caliber, approached Halpern and opened fire, the former striking him 11 times, and the latter 3 times. Halpern was hospitalized with a severe wound to his hand. The hand injury would end Halpern's career. A few months later, Halpern's ex-girlfriend, Melendez, pleaded guilty to charges related to the attack. He later advertised auto parts in New York and worked as a cornerman. He was arrested on a number of occasions for such charges as conspiring to murder, and weapons charges. Halpern's last public appearance was in May 2008. A boxing reunion at Ring 8 in New York City reunited Halpern with his former ring rival Guy "The Rock" Casale. The feature screenplay, "The Third Round", written by Ben Fiore and Bobby's ring rival, Guy 'The Rock' Casale, features segments of Bobby's life and career and centers upon their fight at MSG in 1978.

Halpern out-lived his siblings and died on February 8, 2015.

== Professional boxing record ==
Result	Record	Opponent	Method	Date	Round	Time	Event	Location	Notes
Loss	10-4-0	(United States) Guy "Rock" Casale	KO	1978 May 15	3			New York, New York	
Win	10-3-0	(United States) John Kane	TKO	1978 Apr 05	4			White Plains, New York	
Loss	9-3-0	(United States) John Kane	TKO	1978 Feb 23	6			North Bergen, New Jersey	
Win	9-2-0	(United States) Johnny Blaine	KO	1978 Jan 18	1			White Plains, New York	
Win	8-2-0	(United States) Diego Joe Roberson	KO	1977 Nov 09	7			White Plains, New York	
Win	7-2-0	(United States) Freddy McKay	KO	1977	3			Westchester, New York	Source: Sports Illustrated
Win	6-2-0	(United States) Johnny Blaine	KO	1977 Sep 09	3			White Plains, New York	
Win	5-2-0	(United States) Diego Joe Roberson	KO	1977 Jun 24	1			Nanuet, New York	
Win	4-2-0	(United States) David Conteh	PTS	1977 Apr 19	6			White Plains, New York	
Loss	3-2-0	(Jamaica) Trevor Berbick	KO	1977 Nov 23	3			Halifax, Canada	
Win	3-1-0	(United States) Terry Lee Kidd	KO	1977 Nov 10	1			South Orange, New Jersey	
Loss	2-1-0	(United States) Tom McNeeley	PTS	1958 Dec 19	4			New York, New York	
Win	2-0-0	(United States) Henry Wallitsch	PTS	1958	6			New York, New York	
Win	1-0-0	(United States) Atillo Tondo	PTS	1958 Nov 17	4			New York, New York	
