= Tim Witherspoon vs. Pinklon Thomas =

Boxing match

Blockbuster
- Date: August 31, 1984
- Venue: Riviera Hotel & Casino, Winchester, Nevada, U.S.
- Title(s) on the line: WBC heavyweight title

Tale of the tape
Boxer	Tim Witherspoon	Pinklon Thomas
Nickname	Terrible	Pinky
Hometown	Philadelphia, Pennsylvania, U.S.	Pontiac, Michigan, U.S.
Purse	$400,000	$100,000
Pre-fight record	18–1 (12 KO)	24–0–1 (20 KO)
Age	26 years, 8 months	26 years, 6 months
Height	6 ft 3 1/2 in (192 cm)	6 ft 3 in (191 cm)
Weight	216 lb (98 kg)	216 lb (98 kg)
Style	Orthodox	Orthodox
Recognition	WBC; Heavyweight Champion; The Ring; No. 2 Ranked Heavyweight	WBC; No. 3 Ranked Heavyweight; The Ring; No. 4 Ranked Heavyweight

Result
- Thomas wins via 12-round majority decision (116–112, 115–112, 114–114)

Tim Witherspoon vs. Pinklon Thomas, billed as the Blockbuster, was a professional match contested on August 31, 1984, for the WBC heavyweight title.

== Background ==
The Tim Witherspoon–Pinklon Thomas heavyweight title fight was announced by promoter Don King on July 13, 1984, to take place at the Riviera Hotel & Casino in Winchester, Nevada the following month on August 31. Witherspoon was making the first defense of his WBC heavyweight title after defeating Greg Page in March to claim the title, which had been vacated by longtime champion Larry Holmes in December 1983. The undefeated Thomas was ranked as the WBC's number-three heavyweight contender, having risen to that spot after defeating Bruce Grandham on a Don King-produced card held in Puerto Rico on June 20.

Witherspoon was unhappy with the $400,000 purse King offered, claiming he was "broke" after only taking home $43,000 of the $400,000 purse he earned for his title fight and stating "I'm the champion but what have I got to show for it?" Witherspoon also complained that he would be "lucky if I have $100,000 left" as his contract stated that King's stepson Carl, who acted as Witherspoon's manager, was entitled to half of Witherspoon's purses. As a result, only days before the fight was to take place, Witherspoon threatened to pull out of the fight if King didn't increase his purse. King met with Witherspoon and successfully convinced him to continue on with the fight, telling the media "everything is resolved."

In addition to the Witherspoon–Thomas title fight, the card also featured Greg Page vs. David Bey for the USBA heavyweight title, as well as former heavyweight champions Michael Dokes and Mike Weaver, who faced Mike Jamieson and Billy Joe Thomas respectively.

== Fight details ==
Thomas would get an upset victory over Witherspoon, winning via majority decision with two judges scoring the fight in his favor with scores of 115–112 and 116–112, while the third scored the fight even at 114–114.

Though Witherspoon got off to a good start and took the opening round on the scorecards, Thomas was able to utilize his jab effectively and controlled most of the early rounds thereafter, building up a lead after seven rounds that Witherspoon, who boxed more aggressively from round eight on and was able to make the fight closer by winning several of the later rounds, could not overcome. There were no knockdowns in the fight, though Thomas did have a 10–8 round in the fifth round after referee Richard Steele deducted one point from Witherspoon for rabbit punching. The lost point did not affect the outcome, though Thomas would've won by split decision rather than by majority decision.

== Fight card ==
Confirmed bouts:

Weight Class	Weight		vs.		Method	Round	Notes
Heavyweight	200+ lbs.	Pinklon Thomas	def.	Tim Witherspoon (c)	MD	12	^{note 1}
Heavyweight	200+ lbs.	David Bey	def.	Greg Page (c)	UD	12	^{note 2}
Heavyweight	200+ lbs.	Michael Dokes	def.	Mike Jameson	UD	12
Heavyweight	200+ lbs.	Mitch Green	def.	Sammy Scaff	TKO	6/10
Heavyweight	200+ lbs.	Mike Weaver	def.	Billy Joe Thomas	TKO	7/10

^Note 1 For WBC Heavyweight Title
^Note 2 For USBA Heavyweight Title

== Broadcasting ==
Country	Broadcaster
United States	HBO

Preceded by vs. Greg Page	Tim Witherspoon's bouts August 31, 1984	Succeeded by vs. Mark Willis
Preceded by vs. Bruce Grandham	Pinklon Thomas's bouts August 31, 1984	Succeeded by vs. Mike Weaver
