= Tom McNeeley =

American boxer

Thomas William McNeeley Jr. (February 27, 1937 – October 25, 2011) was a heavyweight boxer in the 1950s and 1960s. He came from Arlington, Massachusetts, and played football for Michigan State University. His son, Peter McNeeley, and father, Tom McNeeley Sr., were also boxers.

== Career ==
Tom McNeeley had his first professional bout at the Norwood Stockcar Arena July 17, 1958. On December 4, 1961, McNeeley challenged Floyd Patterson for the world heavyweight championship, McNeeley's most famous bout. McNeeley was on the November 13, 1961, cover of Sports Illustrated. He later served eight years as the boxing commissioner of the Massachusetts State Boxing Commission.

== Death ==
McNeeley died on October 25, 2011, at the age of 74 of complications from a seizure.

== Professional boxing record ==
37 Wins (28 knockouts, 8 decisions, 1 DQ), 14 Losses (5 knockouts, 8 decisions, 1 DQ)
Result	Record	Opponent	Type	Round	Date	Location	Notes
Loss	20–19–1	(United States) Curtis Bruce	MD	10	14/06/1966	(United States) Four Seasons Arena, Walpole, Massachusetts	
Loss	2–2	(United States) Boston Jacobs	PTS	10	24/03/1966	(United States) Portland Exposition Building, Portland, Maine	
Win	3–1	(Canada) Jean-Claude Roy	SD	10	08/03/1966	(United States) Lewiston City Hall, Lewiston, Maine	
Win	7–2	(United States) Dick Greatorex	TKO	7	12/02/1966	(United States) Boston Garden, Boston, Massachusetts	New England Heavyweight Title. Referee stopped the bout at 2:00 of the seventh round.
Win	18–3–1	(United States) Marion Connor	TKO	9	13/12/1965	(United States) Boston Garden, Boston, Massachusetts	New England Heavyweight Title. Referee stopped the bout at 1:10 of the ninth round.
Loss	17–3–1	(United States) Marion Connor	UD	12	15/10/1965	(United States) Boston Arena, Boston, Massachusetts	New England Heavyweight Title.
Loss	35–1–1	(United States) José Torres	UD	10	31/07/1965	Hiram Bithorn Stadium, San Juan, Puerto Rico	
Loss	13–2	(United States) James J Beattie	KO	5	27/03/1965	(United States) Boston Garden, Boston, Massachusetts	McNeeley knocked out at 2:50 of the fifth round.
Win	18–1	(United States) Arnie Brower	TKO	10	13/02/1965	(United States) Boston Garden, Boston, Massachusetts	New England Heavyweight Title. Referee stopped the bout at 2:20 of the tenth round.
Loss	21–2	(United States) Thad Spencer	KO	5	09/11/1964	(United States) Santa Monica Civic Auditorium, Santa Monica, California	McNeeley knocked out at 1:39 of the fifth round.
Win	27–9–2	(United States) Hal Carter	KO	5	13/10/1964	(United States) Woodhouse Arenatorium, North Dartmouth, Massachusetts	
Loss	5–0	(Argentina) Oscar Bonavena	TKO	5	21/08/1964	(United States) Madison Square Garden, New York City, New York	
Win	13–5–1	(Canada) Leslie Borden	KO	4	16/07/1964	(United States) Burlington, Vermont	
Win	23–8	(United States) Don Quinn	TKO	4	25/04/1964	(United States) Boston Arena, Boston, Massachusetts	
Loss	22–4–1	(United States) Doug Jones	TKO	5	03/02/1964	(United States) New York Coliseum, New York City, New York	
Win	17–14–2	(United States) Duke Sabedong	UD	10	09/12/1963	(United States) Boston Garden, Boston, Massachusetts	
Win	16–13–1	(United States) Duke Sabedong	DQ	2	14/10/1963	(United States) Boston Arena, Boston, Massachusetts	Sabedong disqualified at 1:55 of the second round for a low blow.
Win	8–18–2	(United States) Earl Atley	TKO	2	16/09/1963	(United States) Boston Arena, Boston, Massachusetts	Referee stopped the bout at 2:01 of the second round.
Win	19–2–1	(United States) Bill Nielsen	TKO	8	17/06/1963	(United States) Omaha Civic Auditorium, Omaha, Nebraska	
Loss	27–9	(United Kingdom) Brian London	PTS	10	29/01/1963	(United Kingdom) London Olympia, London	
Loss	34–4–1	(Canada) Bob Cleroux	SD	10	14/12/1962	(United States) Boston Garden, Boston, Massachusetts	
Win	9–9	(United States) Billy Tisdale	TKO	7	15/11/1962	(United States) Mechanics Hall, Worcester, Massachusetts	Referee stopped the bout at 2:43 of the seventh round.
Win	8–15–2	(United States) Earl Atley	TKO	8	01/11/1962	(United States) Mechanics Hall, Worcester, Massachusetts	Referee stopped the bout at 1:55 of the eighth round.
Loss	16–5–1	(United States) Don McAteer	DQ	6	08/06/1962	(United States) Celtic Hall, Totowa, New Jersey	
Loss	53–10–6	(United States) Willie Pastrano	UD	10	01/05/1962	(United States) Boston Arena, Boston, Massachusetts	
Win	19–3	(United States) Don Prout	UD	10	16/03/1962	(United States) Boston Garden, Boston, Massachusetts	
Loss	17–3	(United States) Don Prout	SD	10	22/01/1962	(United States) Rhode Island Auditorium, Providence, Rhode Island	
Loss	37–2	(United States) Floyd Patterson	KO	4	04/12/1961	(Canada) Maple Leaf Gardens, Toronto, Ontario	World Heavyweight Title. McNeeley knocked out at 2:51 of the fourth round. Jersey Joe Walcott refereed the bout.
Win	49–17–2	(Tonga) Kitione Lave	TKO	3	21/03/1961	(United States) Boston Arena, Boston, Massachusetts	
Win	15–3–1	(United States) George Logan	UD	10	20/12/1960	(United States) Boston Garden, Boston, Massachusetts	Rocky Marciano refereed the bout.
Win	15–2–1	(United States) George Logan	MD	10	15/11/1960	(United States) Boston Garden, Boston, Massachusetts	
Win	6–12–3	(United States) Jim Wyley	TKO	3	17/10/1960	(United States) Rhode Island Auditorium, Providence, Rhode Island	
Win	20–3–4	(Germany) Ulli Ritter	TKO	8	16/05/1960	(United States) Boston Arena, Boston, Massachusetts	Referee stopped the bout at 2:52 of the eighth round.
Win	15–8–1	(United States) Tunney Hunsaker	TKO	9	12/04/1960	(United States) Boston Arena, Boston, Massachusetts	Referee stopped the bout at 1:30 of the ninth round.
Win	42–19–7	(Germany) Willi Besmanoff	PTS	10	14/03/1960	(United States) Boston Garden, Boston, Massachusetts	
Win	12–1–1	(United States) George Logan	TKO	4	01/01/1960	(United States) Madison Square Garden, New York City, New York	Referee stopped the bout at 3:00 of the fourth round.
Win	3–10	(United States) Louis Jones	TKO	4	27/11/1959	(United States) Madison Square Garden, New York City, New York	Referee stopped the bout at 0:19 of the fourth round.
Win	3–8	(United States) Louis Jones	UD	6	31/07/1959	(United States) Madison Square Garden, New York City, New York	
Win	10–3–1	(United States) Cardell Farmos	KO	3	27/06/1959	(United States) Hill Arena, West Yarmouth, Massachusetts	
Win	0–1	(United States) Jeff Holmes	KO	2	25/05/1959	(United States) Arcadia Ballroom, Providence, Rhode Island	
Win	3–2	(United States) Charlie Lopes	KO	1	02/05/1959	(United States) Boston Arena, Boston, Massachusetts	
Win	--	(United States) Leo Pinto	KO	2	21/04/1959	(United States) Woodrow Wilson Hall, New Bedford, Massachusetts	
Win	2–18–1	(United States) Joe Louis Brown	KO	2	17/03/1959	(United States) Boston Garden, Boston, Massachusetts	Brown knocked out at 1:38 of the second round.
Win	12–5	(United States) Art Mayorga	KO	3	30/01/1959	(United States) Madison Square Garden, New York City, New York	
Win	7–0	(United States) Bobby Halpern	PTS	4	19/12/1958	(United States) Madison Square Garden, New York City, New York	
Win	6–0	(United States) Mossie Walker	KO	1	28/11/1958	(United States) Madison Square Garden, New York City, New York	Walker knocked out at 0:55 of the first round.
Win	5-0	(United States) Eddie Allen	KO	3	17/10/1958	(United States) Madison Square Garden, New York City, New York	Allen knocked out at 1:17 of the third round.
Win	4-0	Eddie Walker	KO	1	06/10/1958	(United States) Mechanics Hall, Boston, Massachusetts	
Win	3-0	Temple Jones	KO	3	14/08/1958	(United States) Mark's Stadium, Fall River, Massachusetts	
Win	2–0	(United States) Bob Harris	KO	5	04/08/1958	(United States) Arena, Norwood, Massachusetts	
Win	1–0	(United States) Richie Norden	KO	2	17/07/1958	(United States) Arena, Norwood, Massachusetts	Norden knocked out at 2:00 of the second round.

== See also ==
- Peter D. Fuller, who served as McNeeley's manager, 1957 – c. 1961
