= Pinklon Thomas vs. Trevor Berbick =

The Heavyweight World Series: Thomas vs. Berbick
- Date: March 22, 1986
- Venue: Riviera Hotel & Casino, Winchester, Nevada, U.S.
- Title(s) on the line: WBC heavyweight title

Tale of the tape
Boxer	Pinklon Thomas	Trevor Berbick
Nickname	Pinky	The Young Buffalo
Hometown	Pontiac, Michigan, U.S.	Port Antonio, Jamaica
Purse	$635,000	$50,000
Pre-fight record	26–0–1 (21 KO)	30–4–1 (23 KO)
Age	28 years, 1 month	31 years, 7 months
Height	6 ft 3 in (191 cm)	6 ft 2 in (188 cm)
Weight	222 3/4 lb (101 kg)	218 1/2 lb (99 kg)
Style	Orthodox	Orthodox
Recognition	WBC; Heavyweight Champion	WBC; No. 1 Ranked Heavyweight

Result
- Berbick wins via 12-round unanimous decision (115–114, 115–113, 115–113)

Pinklon Thomas vs. Trevor Berbick was a professional match contested on March 22, 1986, for the WBC heavyweight title.

== Background ==
In January 1986, promoters Don King and Butch Lewis announced plans for the Heavyweight unification series, otherwise known as the Heavyweight World Series. The series stemmed from King trying to sell a WBC heavyweight title bout between champion Pinklon Thomas and challenger Trevor Berbick to HBO in October 1985, which Seth Abraham, the senior vice president of HBO Sports rejected. After King persisted, Abraham suggested that HBO would broadcast the Thomas–Berbick if it were part of a deal "where we bring all the champions together." King, who promoted both the WBC and WBA heavyweight champions; Thomas and Tim Witherspoon, Lewis, the promoter of IBF heavyweight champion Michael Spinks, and HBO then got to work on the series and finally came to an agreement on Christmas Eve. The series would include all three of the major heavyweight champions, plus a bevy of heavyweight contenders, including the then-19-year old undefeated sensation Mike Tyson. The tournament was planned to conclude in the summer of 1987 with the winner unifying all three belts and thus becoming undisputed heavyweight champion. The Thomas–Berbick was announced to open the unification series on March 22, 1986.

Thomas was a heavy 6 1/2–1 favorite going into the bout.

Boxing judge Harold Lederman would begin his 32-year career as HBO's "unofficial ringside scorer" with this broadcast.

== Fight details ==
The fight would go the full 12-round distance with Berbick pulling off the upset victory, having narrowly won all three of the official scorecards by two scores of 115–113 and one score of 115–114.

There were no knockdowns in the fight and neither fighter was in serious trouble, but it nevertheless was a tough, close fight that saw both fighters trading punches throughout, which led to bruising on both fighter's faces, as well as their eyes swelling up by the end. Thomas, mainly using his left jab, started the fight strongly and took the lead on all three scorecards at one point, but seemed to tire midway through as Berbick finished strongly fighting mainly on the inside, reducing the effectiveness of Thomas' jabs and getting the better of their exchanges.

== Fight card ==
Confirmed bouts:

Weight Class	Weight		vs.		Method	Round	Notes
Heavyweight	200+ lbs.	Trevor Berbick	def.	Pinklon Thomas (c)	UD	12	^{note 1}
Cruiserweight	190 lbs.	Carlos De León	def.	Bernard Benton (c)	UD	12	^{note 2}
Light Middleweight	154 lbs.	Julian Jackson	def.	Mark Allman	TKO	1/10
Light Welterweight	140 lbs.	Julio César Chávez	def.	Roberto Collins	KO	2/10
Light Middleweight	154 lbs.	Glenn Thomas	def.	Jay Murphy	PTS	6
Heavyweight	200+ lbs.	James Pritchard	def.	Allen Hudson	KO	4/6
Featherweight	126 lbs.	Henry Rodriguez	def.	Tony Cisneros	TKO	4/4

^Note 1 For WBC Heavyweight Title
^Note 2 For WBC and The Ring Cruiserweight Titles

== Broadcasting ==
Country	Broadcaster
United States	HBO

Preceded by vs. Mike Weaver	Pinklon Thomas's bouts March 22, 1986	Succeeded by vs. Narcisco Maldonado
Preceded by vs. Mike Perkins	Trevor Berbick's bouts March 22, 1986	Succeeded by vs. Mike Tyson
