= David Bey =

American boxer (1957–2017)

Personal information
- Nickname: Hand Grenade
- Nationality: American
- Born: David Bey; March 11, 1957 Philadelphia, Pennsylvania, U.S.
- Died: September 13, 2017 (aged 60) Camden, New Jersey, U.S.
- Height: 6 ft 3 in (1.91 m)
- Weight: Heavyweight

Boxing career
- Stance: Orthodox

Boxing record
- Total fights: 30
- Wins: 18
- Win by KO: 14
- Losses: 11
- Draws: 1
- No contests: 0

David Bey (March 11, 1957 – September 13, 2017) was an American heavyweight boxer who held the USBA title. He unsuccessfully challenged Larry Holmes for the heavyweight title in 1985.

Bey was an outstanding amateur boxer who had taken up the sport to lose weight and eventually competed on the U.S. All Army Boxing Team. He made his professional debut in 1981, defeating future undisputed world heavyweight champion James "Buster" Douglas by a second-round knockout. He built up a record of 14–0, becoming the first man to stop the durable veteran contender George Chaplin (TKO4) as well as defeating future WBA heavyweight champion Greg Page (W12) to capture the United States Boxing Association heavyweight championship.

In March 1985 Bey was given a title shot by IBF heavyweight champion Larry Holmes. After a strong start, Holmes knocked Bey down twice in the 8th round and the referee stopped the fight in the 10th round.

Bey never regained his confidence, losing his USBA title by 11th-round TKO to Trevor Berbick in his comeback fight, then being relegated to 'opponent' status for the remainder of his career, matched against the likes of James "Bonecrusher" Smith, Joe Bugner in Australia, Tyrell Biggs, and Johnny DuPlooy in South Africa. He retired in 1987 after losing to DuPlooy, but made a comeback in 1990 in which he went 3-5-1. In 1994 in his final fight he knocked out David Jaco in China. He lived in China for a time before returning to the States and his old construction job.

Bey died in a construction accident in Camden in 2017.

== Professional boxing record ==
18 Wins (14 knockouts, 4 decisions), 11 Losses (4 knockouts, 3 decisions), 1 Draw
Result	Record	Opponent	Type	Round	Date	Location	Notes
Win	18–11–1	(United States) David Jaco	TKO	8	1994-09-17	Macao, China	
Loss	17–11–1	(Croatia) Zeljko Mavrovic	TKO	4	1993-10-16	Koblenz, Germany	
Loss	17–10–1	(United States) Terry Davis	UD	12	1993-02-27	Beijing, China	NBA Continental Americas Heavyweight Title.
Loss	17–9–1	(United Kingdom) Derek Williams	TKO	6	1991-09-30	(United Kingdom) London, England	
Draw	17–8–1	(United States) David Jaco	PTS	10	1991-09-07	(United States) Sarasota, Florida, U.S.	
Loss	17–8	(United States) Joe Hipp	TKO	7	1991-02-26	(United States) Birmingham, Alabama, U.S.	Referee stopped the bout at 1:07 of the seventh round.
Loss	17–7	(United States) Bruce Seldon	TKO	10	1990-11-01	(United States) Atlantic City, New Jersey, U.S.	Referee stopped the bout at 0:38 of the tenth round.
Win	17–6	(United States) Terry Miller	KO	2	1990-08-21	(United States) Raleigh, North Carolina, U.S.	
Win	16–6	(United States) Paul Bradshaw	TKO	3	1990-02-17	Edmonton, Alberta, Canada	
Loss	15–6	(South Africa) Johnny DuPlooy	KO	9	1987-04-27	Johannesburg, South Africa	
Loss	15–5	(United States) Tyrell Biggs	TKO	6	1987-03-07	(United States) Las Vegas, Nevada, U.S.	Referee stopped the bout at 2:15 of the sixth round.
Loss	15–4	(Australia) Joe Bugner	UD	10	1986-11-14	Sydney, Australia	
Loss	15–3	(United States) James Smith	UD	10	1986-08-23	(United States) Fayetteville, North Carolina, U.S.	
Win	15–2	(United States) Wesley Smith	SD	10	Jan 17, 1986	(Georgia (U.S. state)) Atlanta, Georgia, U.S.	Split Decision win 10 Rounds.
Loss	14–2	(Canada) Trevor Berbick	TKO	11	1985-06-15	(United States) Las Vegas, Nevada, U.S.	USBA Heavyweight Title. Referee stopped the bout at 2:30 of the 11th round.
Loss	14–1	(United States) Larry Holmes	TKO	10	1985-03-15	(United States) Las Vegas, Nevada, U.S.	For IBF, The Ring, and lineal heavyweight titles.
Win	14–0	(United States) Greg Page	UD	12	Aug 31, 1984	(United States) Las Vegas, Nevada, U.S.	USBA Heavyweight Title.
Win	13–0	(United States) Leroy Caldwell	PTS	10	Mar 9, 1984	(United States) Las Vegas, Nevada, U.S.	
Win	12–0	(United States) Alf Coffin	KO	2	1983-08-17	(United States) Las Vegas, Nevada, U.S.	
Win	11–0	(United States) Grady Daniels	KO	1	1983-07-16	(United States) Las Vegas, Nevada, U.S.	Daniels knocked out at 2:01 of the first round.
Win	10–0	(United States) Chuck Johnson	TKO	3	1983-02-12	(United States) Cleveland, Ohio, U.S.	
Win	9–0	(United States) George Chaplin	TKO	4	1982-11-26	(United States) Houston, Texas, U.S.	
Win	8–0	(United States) Larry Beilfuss	TKO	1	1982-10-02	(United States) Atlantic City, New Jersey, U.S.	
Win	7–0	(United States) Jack Watkins	KO	2	1982-08-14	(United States) Cleveland, Ohio, U.S.	
Win	6–0	(United States) Larry Sims	PTS	6	1982-06-27	(United States) Highland Heights, Ohio, U.S.	
Win	5–0	(United States) Laverne Bumpers	TKO	1	1982-05-02	(United States) Atlantic City, New Jersey, U.S.	
Win	4–0	D.B. Johnson	KO	1	1982-04-09	(United States) Cleveland, Ohio, U.S.	
Win	3–0	(United States) Steve Flemester	TKO	2	1982-03-20	(United States) Atlantic City, New Jersey, U.S.	
Win	2–0	Larry Ham	TKO	1	1982-02-24	(United States) Atlantic City, New Jersey, U.S.	
Win	1–0	(United States) James Douglas	TKO	2	1981-11-06	(United States) Pittsburgh, Pennsylvania, U.S.	
