= Trevor Berbick =

Jamaican boxer (1954–2006)

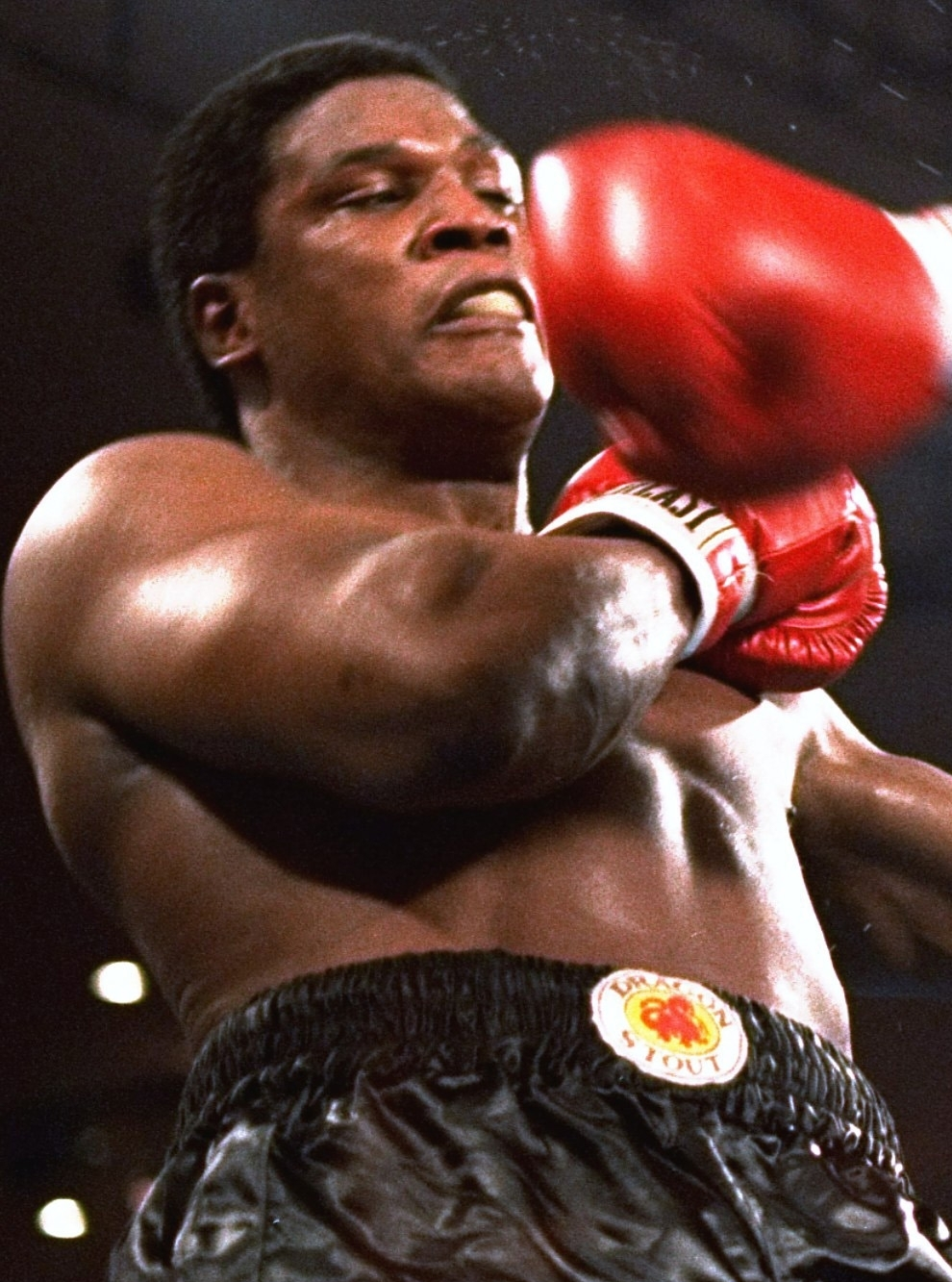
- Berbick in 1986, during his fight against Mike Tyson

Personal information
- Nicknames: The Young Buffalo; The Fighting Preacher
- Born: 1 August 1954 Port Antonio, Portland Parish, Colony of Jamaica (now Jamaica)
- Died: 28 October 2006 (aged 52) Port Antonio, Portland, Jamaica
- Height: 6 ft 2 in (188 cm)
- Weight: Heavyweight

Boxing career
- Reach: 78 in (198 cm)
- Stance: Orthodox

Boxing record
- Total fights: 61
- Wins: 49
- Win by KO: 33
- Losses: 11
- Draws: 1
Medal record
Men's amateur boxing
Representing Jamaica
Pan American Games
Bronze medal – third place	1975 Mexico City	Heavyweight

Trevor Berbick (1 August 1954 – 28 October 2006) was a Jamaican professional boxer who competed from 1976 to 2000. He won the WBC heavyweight title in 1986 by defeating Pinklon Thomas, then lost it in his first defense in the same year to Mike Tyson. Berbick was the last boxer to fight Muhammad Ali, defeating him in 1981 by unanimous decision.

As an amateur, Berbick won a bronze medal in the heavyweight division at the 1975 Pan American Games. In both his early and late professional career he held the Canadian heavyweight title twice, from 1979 to 1986 and 1999 to 2001. Berbick is the only boxer to have fought Muhammad Ali, Larry Holmes, and Mike Tyson.

== Early life ==
Berbick was born on 1 August 1954 in the Norwich area of Port Antonio, Portland Parish, Jamaica. As a young man, he worked at the Guantanamo Bay U.S. Naval Base in Cuba, where he first took up boxing as a means of self-defence.

== Amateur career ==
At 22, Berbick represented his native Jamaica in the 1976 Summer Olympics in Montreal, Quebec, Canada as a heavyweight boxer, despite having had only 11 prior amateur bouts. His lack of experience was evident as he lost to the eventual silver medalist, Mircea Şimon of Romania. However, he still displayed a lot of promise as a young heavyweight boxer. The previous year, in his only bout at the Pan American Games in Mexico City, Berbick lost a decision to future heavyweight champion Michael Dokes in the semi-finals, winning a bronze medal.

Leroy Caldwell, a boxer who fought almost all notable top-ranked heavyweights of the 1970s and early 1980s, including several world champions, recalled that Berbick was his most talented opponent.

== Professional career ==
Berbick left Jamaica after the Olympics. He opted to settle in Montreal and fight professionally out of Halifax. He won his first 11 fights (10 by knockout) before suffering his first pro loss to another rising contender, Bernardo Mercado, on 3 April 1979. As an amateur, Berbick had soundly beaten Mercado. However, with 10 seconds remaining in the first round of their only professional meeting, Berbick walked into a punch and was knocked out.

A 1980 upset of ex-champ John Tate (9th-round KO) secured a title shot against Larry Holmes on 11 April 1981, but Berbick lost a 15-round unanimous decision. In his second fight after the loss, he beat 39-year-old Muhammad Ali by unanimous decision in the final fight of Ali's career.

In 1982, he beat undefeated prospect Greg Page, and in 1984 he moved to Miramar, Florida and signed with promoter Don King. Wins over undefeated Mitch "Blood" Green and David Bey scored him another title fight.

Berbick won the WBC world heavyweight title by upsetting Pinklon Thomas with a unanimous decision on 22 March 1986. The champion Thomas was a 6 1/2-to-1 favorite, but Berbick won a battle of attrition by wearing Thomas down with his strength and quickness. Almost knocking down Thomas in the 11th round with a powerful left hook. Both fighter's faces showed the "meanness and toughness" of the battle; Berbick marked around both eyes, Thomas cut in the corner of his left eye. The scores for Berbick were 115/113 twice, and 115/114. The Associated Press (AP) scored it 116-113 for Berbick.

However, Berbick's reign as champion would be brief.

On 22 November, in his first defense of the title, Berbick took on Mike Tyson, who was looking to break Floyd Patterson's record and become, at the age of twenty, the youngest ever heavyweight champion. In the second round, Tyson dropped Berbick with a quick knockdown. Berbick was quickly overwhelmed by his opponent and late in the round, he went down again. The champion rose to his feet, but immediately stumbled backward and fell back to the canvas. Berbick tried twice more to make it to his feet but fell both times, and referee Mills Lane stopped counting and waved the fight off to end Berbick's reign as champion.

Berbick resumed his boxing career in 1994, frequently fighting on the USA Tuesday Night Fights. He would score a mild upset over Melvin Foster but would go on to lose to prospects such as Jimmy Thunder and Hasim Rahman. He eventually fought his last bout in 2000 against Canadian journeyman Shane Sutcliffe, winning a 12-round unanimous decision. Afterwards, a CAT scan revealed a blood clot in his brain and his boxing license was revoked. His final professional record was 49 wins (33 by knockout), 11 losses, and 1 draw.

== Exhibition bout ==
In 1991, Berbick traveled to the UWFi promotion in Japan to fight Nobuhiko Takada in a "boxer vs. wrestler" bout. Berbick claimed that he had been double-crossed and that he had expected the fight to be like American kickboxing, but it turned out that the rules allowed Takada to kick Berbick below the belt. According to UWFi trainer Pat McCarthy, "no rules were ever changed, and [Berbick] just never wanted to listen". Berbick refused to mount any offense, instead repeatedly complaining to the referee as Takada landed repeated low kicks to his legs. Takada claimed victory by default when Berbick exited the ring.

== Outside the ring ==
Berbick trained young boxers in New Westminster, British Columbia in the late 1990s to early 2000s.

For some time, Berbick was a preacher at the Moments of Miracles Pentecostal church in Las Vegas. He claimed to have a religious experience at the age of 16.

=== Rape conviction ===
Berbick was arrested on a number of occasions throughout his life and was sentenced in Florida to five years in prison for raping his children's babysitter in 1992. He served only 15 months. In 1997, he violated his parole and was deported from the United States to Canada. Due to his legal issues, he also had problems staying in Canada, losing his landed immigrant status and being ordered back to Jamaica in 1999. Later in 1999, he won the right to remain in Canada.

=== Feud with Larry Holmes ===
Berbick had a well-publicized feud with Larry Holmes, whom he fought in the ring in 1981. Their feud culminated in a public confrontation and brawl in 1991, which was caught on tape. After a verbal altercation indoors, Berbick was outside complaining about being kicked and punched by Larry Holmes when Holmes climbed atop a parked car and launched himself at Berbick. Holmes was furious with Berbick badmouthing his family. The footage ends as the two are separated by police and others.

=== Retirement ===
Berbick retired in Florida to be with his wife and four children (he had three children with his first wife in Montreal) and started to train boxers at Kenny Barrett's Gym in Tamarac, Florida. Berbick's problems escalated. He was again deported from the U.S. on 2 December 2002.

== Death ==
On 28 October 2006, Berbick was murdered at a church in Port Antonio, Jamaica, by an assailant wielding a 2-inch-diameter (51 mm) steel pipe. He sustained repeated blows to the head and died at the scene.

Police arrested two men, one of whom was Berbick's 20-year-old nephew Harold Berbick, in connection with the murder. They were interrogated at the Port Antonio police station in Portland early on the morning of 29 October. Local residents indicated that the suspect was involved in a land dispute with Berbick. On 3 November it was reported that Berbick's nephew, 20-year-old Harold Berbick, and an unidentified 18-year-old man had been charged with his murder by Jamaican police. On 20 December 2007, Harold Berbick was convicted for the murder of his uncle. His accomplice, Kenton Gordon, was convicted of manslaughter and both men were sentenced on 11 January 2008. Harold Berbick was sentenced to life in prison; Kenton Gordon was sentenced to fourteen years in prison.

== Professional boxing record ==
61 fights	49 wins	11 losses
By knockout	33	2
By decision	16	9
Draws	1	

No.	Result	Record	Opponent	Type	Round, time	Date	Location	Notes
61	Win	49–11–1	Shane Sutcliffe	UD	12	26 May 2000	PNE Agrodome, Vancouver, British Columbia, Canada	Retained Canada heavyweight title
60	Loss	48–11–1	Tony LaRosa	SD	8	12 Aug 1999	Slave Lake, Alberta, Canada	
59	Win	48–10–1	Iran Barkley	UD	8	29 Jun 1999	Molson Centre, Montreal, Quebec, Canada	
58	Win	47–10–1	Shane Sutcliffe	TKO	12 (12), 0:44	5 Feb 1999	Centre Pierre Charbonneau, Montreal, Quebec, Canada	Won Canada heavyweight title
57	Win	46–10–1	Ben Perlini	UD	10	6 Aug 1998	Slave Lake, Alberta, Canada	
56	Loss	45–10–1	Lyle McDowell	SD	12	15 Sep 1997	Shaw Conference Centre, Edmonton, Alberta, Canada	For vacant IBO Inter-Continental heavyweight title
55	Loss	45–9–1	Hasim Rahman	UD	10	15 Oct 1996	Circus Maximus Showroom, Atlantic City, New Jersey, U.S.	
54	Win	45–8–1	Louis Monaco	UD	10	18 Sep 1996	Westbury Music Fair, North Hempstead, New York, U.S.	
53	Win	44–8–1	Ken Smith	TKO	4 (10), 1:05	26 Apr 1996	Westbury Music Fair, North Hempstead, New York, U.S.	
52	Win	43–8–1	Bruce Johnson	TKO	3 (10)	25 Aug 1995	Columbus, Ohio, U.S.	
51	Loss	42–8–1	Jimmy Thunder	UD	12	15 Mar 1995	Mystic Lake Casino Hotel, Prior Lake, Minnesota, U.S.	For vacant WBC Continental Americas heavyweight title
50	Win	42–7–1	Melvin Foster	SD	10	13 Sep 1994	Westbury Music Fair, North Hempstead, New York, U.S.	
49	Win	41–7–1	Marselles Brown	KO	2 (10)	10 Aug 1994	Lakefront Arena, New Orleans, Louisiana, U.S.	
48	Win	40–7–1	Paul Phillips	KO	4 (10), 1:14	30 Jul 1994	Myrl H. Shoemaker Center, Cincinnati, Ohio, U.S.	
47	Win	39–7–1	Danny Wofford	PTS	8	14 Mar 1994	Spartanburg, South Carolina, U.S.	
46	Win	38–7–1	Garing Lane	PTS	8	2 Aug 1991	Palais des Festivals et des Congrès, Cannes, France	
45	Win	37–7–1	Bobby Crabtree	KO	5 (10), 2:00	14 Dec 1990	The Diplomat, Hollywood, Florida, U.S.	
44	Win	36–7–1	Jeff Sims	TKO	6 (10), 2:15	18 Jul 1990	Varsity Arena, Toronto, Ontario, Canada	
43	Loss	35–7–1	Buster Douglas	UD	10	25 Feb 1989	Las Vegas Hilton, Winchester, Nevada, U.S.	
42	Win	35–6–1	O T Davis	KO	3 (10)	20 Sep 1988	Central Plaza Hotel, Oklahoma City, Oklahoma, U.S.	
41	Loss	34–6–1	Carl Williams	UD	12	27 Jun 1988	Convention Hall, Atlantic City, New Jersey, U.S.	For USBA heavyweight title
40	Win	34–5–1	Robert Evans	UD	10	24 Nov 1987	Forum, Halifax, Nova Scotia, Canada	
39	Win	33–5–1	Lorenzo Boyd	TKO	3 (10), 1:48	29 Oct 1987	Musical Theater, Sunrise, Florida, U.S.	
38	Win	32–5–1	Art Terry	TKO	5 (10), 1:33	31 Jul 1987	Lee County Civic Center, North Fort Myers, Florida, U.S.	
37	Loss	31–5–1	Mike Tyson	TKO	2 (12), 2:35	22 Nov 1986	Las Vegas Hilton, Winchester, Nevada, U.S.	Lost WBC heavyweight title
36	Win	31–4–1	Pinklon Thomas	UD	12	22 Mar 1986	Riviera, Winchester, Nevada, U.S.	Won WBC heavyweight title
35	Win	30–4–1	Mike Perkins	TKO	10 (10)	17 Jan 1986	Omni Coliseum, Atlanta, Georgia, U.S.	
34	Win	29–4–1	Mitch Green	MD	12	10 Aug 1985	Riviera, Winchester, Nevada, U.S.	Retained USBA heavyweight title
33	Win	28–4–1	David Bey	TKO	11 (12), 2:30	15 Jun 1985	Riviera, Winchester, Nevada, U.S.	Won USBA heavyweight title
32	Win	27–4–1	Walter Santemore	UD	10	28 Nov 1984	Broadway by the Bay Theater, Atlantic City, New Jersey, U.S.	
31	Win	26–4–1	Andros Ernie Barr	TKO	4 (12)	1 Sep 1984	Nassau, Bahamas	Retained Commonwealth heavyweight title
30	Win	25–4–1	Mark Lee	PTS	10	13 Mar 1984	Wembley Arena, London, England	
29	Win	24–4–1	Mike Cohen	KO	4 (10)	19 Feb 1984	Hyatt Regency, Tampa, Florida, U.S.	
28	Win	23–4–1	Ken Lakusta	KO	10 (12), 1:52	9 Sep 1983	Northlands Coliseum, Edmonton, Alberta, Canada	Retained Commonwealth and Canada heavyweight titles
27	Loss	22–4–1	S. T. Gordon	UD	10	28 May 1983	Showboat Hotel and Casino, Las Vegas, Nevada, U.S.	
26	Loss	22–3–1	Renaldo Snipes	UD	10	2 Oct 1982	Sands, Atlantic City, New Jersey, U.S.	
25	Win	22–2–1	Greg Page	UD	10	11 Jun 1982	Caesars Palace, Paradise, Nevada, U.S.	
24	Win	21–2–1	Gordon Racette	TKO	11 (12)	5 Mar 1982	Frank Crane Arena, Nanaimo, British Columbia, Canada	Retained Commonwealth and Canada heavyweight titles
23	Win	20–2–1	Muhammad Ali	UD	10	11 Dec 1981	Queen Elizabeth Sports Centre, Nassau, Bahamas	
22	Win	19–2–1	Conroy Nelson	KO	2 (15), 2:49	21 Jul 1981	Metro Centre, Halifax, Nova Scotia, Canada	Retained Canada heavyweight title; Won vacant Commonwealth heavyweight title
21	Loss	18–2–1	Larry Holmes	UD	15	11 Apr 1981	Caesars Palace, Paradise, Nevada, U.S.	For WBC and The Ring heavyweight titles
20	Win	18–1–1	Chuck Gardner	TKO	4 (10), 1:12	31 Jan 1981	Kingston, Jamaica	
19	Win	17–1–1	Chuck Findlay	KO	1 (10), 2:47	11 Nov 1980	Metro Centre, Halifax, Nova Scotia, Canada	
18	Win	16–1–1	Ron Rouselle	KO	1 (12), 0:33	27 Aug 1980	Northlands Coliseum, Edmonton, Alberta, Canada	Retained Canada heavyweight title
17	Win	15–1–1	John Tate	KO	9 (10), 0:22	20 Jun 1980	Olympic Stadium, Montreal, Quebec, Canada	
16	Win	14–1–1	Johnny Warr	SD	10	11 Mar 1980	Metro Centre, Halifax, Nova Scotia, Canada	
15	Win	13–1–1	Ngozika Ekwelum	TKO	5 (10), 0:01	11 Dec 1979	Metro Centre, Halifax, Nova Scotia, Canada	
14	Draw	12–1–1	Leroy Caldwell	PTS	10	14 Jun 1979	Convention Centre, Winnipeg, Manitoba, Canada	
13	Win	12–1	Earl McLeay	TKO	7 (12), 2:07	26 May 1979	Glace Bay, Nova Scotia, Canada	Won vacant Canada heavyweight title
12	Loss	11–1	Bernardo Mercado	KO	1 (12), 2:55	3 Apr 1979	Metro Centre, Halifax, Nova Scotia, Canada	For vacant WBC Continental Americas heavyweight title
11	Win	11–0	Greg Sorrentino	TKO	1 (10), 1:27	8 Oct 1978	Metro Centre, Halifax, Nova Scotia, Canada	
10	Win	10–0	Gregory Johnson	KO	4 (10), 2:49	12 Sep 1978	Metro Centre, Halifax, Nova Scotia, Canada	
9	Win	9–0	Tony Moore	TKO	6 (10), 0:01	1 Aug 1978	Metro Centre, Halifax, Nova Scotia, Canada	
8	Win	8–0	Horst Geisler	KO	1 (10), 1:21	28 Jun 1978	Metro Centre, Halifax, Nova Scotia, Canada	
7	Win	7–0	Eugene Green	UD	10	8 Dec 1977	Halifax, Nova Scotia, Canada	
6	Win	6–0	Eddie Owens	TKO	5 (10), 2:34	8 Sep 1977	Forum, Halifax, Nova Scotia, Canada	
5	Win	5–0	Willie Moore	KO	4 (10), 2:04	18 Aug 1977	Halifax, Nova Scotia, Canada	
4	Win	4–0	Joe Maye	TKO	7 (10), 2:50	25 Jan 1977	Metro Centre, Halifax, Nova Scotia, Canada	
3	Win	3–0	Michael Lucas	TKO	2 (6), 2:21	9 Jan 1977	New Glasgow, Nova Scotia, Canada	
2	Win	2–0	Bobby Halpern	TKO	3 (6), 2:05	23 Nov 1976	Forum, Halifax, Nova Scotia, Canada	
1	Win	1–0	Wayne Martin	TKO	5 (6)	27 Sep 1976	Festival Arena, Shediac, New Brunswick, Canada	

== Exhibition boxing record ==
1 fight	0 wins	1 loss
By disqualification	0	1

No.	Result	Record	Opponent	Type	Round, time	Date	Location	Notes
1	Loss	0–1	Nobuhiko Takada	DQ	1 (10), 3:00	Dec 21, 1991	Sumo Hall, Tokyo, Japan	Under special boxing-wrestling rules

Sporting positions
Regional boxing titles
Vacant Title last held by George Chuvalo	Canada heavyweight champion 26 May 1979 – 1986; Vacated	Vacant Title next held by Ken Lakusta
Vacant Title last held by John L. Gardner	Commonwealth heavyweight champion 21 July 1981 – 1986; Vacated	Vacant Title next held by Horace Notice
Preceded by David Bey	USBA heavyweight champion 15 June 1981 – March 1986; Vacated	Vacant Title next held by Tony Tucker
Preceded by Shane Sutcliffe	Canada heavyweight champion 5 February 1999 – October 2001; Retired	Vacant Title next held by Donovan Ruddock
World boxing titles
Preceded by Pinklon Thomas	WBC heavyweight champion 22 March 1986 – 22 November 1986	Succeeded by Mike Tyson
