= Pinklon Thomas =

American boxer

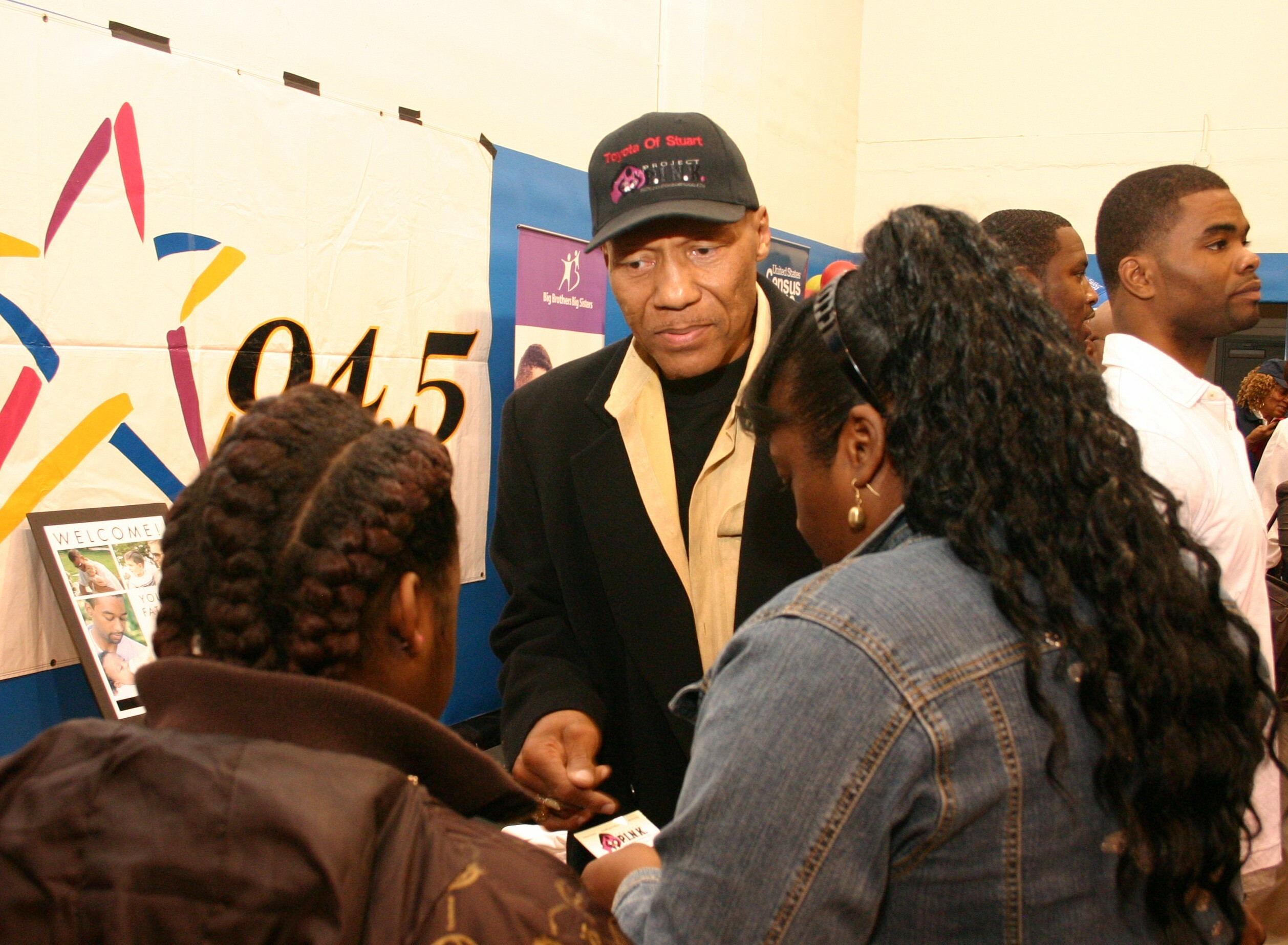

Personal information
- Nickname: Pinky
- Nationality: American
- Born: February 10, 1958 (age 68) Pontiac, Michigan, U.S.
- Height: 6 ft 3 in (191 cm)
- Weight: Heavyweight

Boxing career
- Reach: 77 in (196 cm)
- Stance: Orthodox

Boxing record
- Total fights: 51
- Wins: 43
- Win by KO: 34
- Losses: 7
- Draws: 1

Pinklon Thomas (born February 10, 1958) is an American former professional boxer who competed from 1978 to 1993. He was boxing's first 'Centennial Champion' (1886–1986) and held the WBC heavyweight title from 1984 to 1986. He is considered one of the best boxers of his generation. He beat former heavyweight champions Mike Weaver, Tim Witherspoon, James Tillis and future cruiserweight champion Alfonso Ratliff. He also drew with future WBA Heavyweight Champion Gerrie Coetzee. Thomas was known for his pink boxing trunks and a powerful left jab.

== Early life ==
Thomas is a native of Pontiac, Michigan, who also lived on military bases in South Carolina and Washington. He eventually settled in Orlando, Florida.

== Professional career ==
Thomas turned professional after just three amateur fights.

Thomas took on a number of contenders and champions before his first championship; After a win over multiple time world title challenger James Tillis, in 1983, Thomas took Gerrie Coetzee to a draw, who later that year won the WBA heavyweight belt, and defeated the eventual WBC cruiserweight champion, Alfonso Ratliff. By 1984, with a record of 24–0–1, he would get his first world title shot against reigning WBC heavyweight champion Tim Witherspoon in August 1984, in Las Vegas, Nevada. Thomas won the WBC Heavyweight Championship with a hard-fought 12-round battle over "Terrible" Witherspoon. Ten months later, he defended his title against ex-champion Mike Weaver, stopping Weaver with a single punch in the eighth round. Thomas lost the WBC title to Trevor Berbick in March 1986 by a decision.

=== Thomas vs. Tyson ===
Thomas came back and reeled off three ko wins before setting up a May 1987 challenge to WBC and WBA Heavyweight champion Mike Tyson. Although Thomas allegedly took the fight with a serious shoulder injury, he enjoyed success outjabbing Tyson. After a long break for a torn glove, action resumed in the 6th round in which Tyson had regained his energy and Tyson knocked Thomas out with a brutal fifteen punch salvo, knocking the extremely durable Thomas down for the first and only time in his career. Although he got up inside the count, the fight was waved off.

=== Later career ===
Thomas went in and out of retirement over the following years, taking fights against top contenders.

In December 1988 he returned from a 19-month layoff to fight #1 heavyweight contender Evander Holyfield. Thomas looked rusty as he was outmatched over 7 rounds, and the fight was stopped. Long-time trainer Angelo Dundee advised Thomas to retire and stopped working with him.

Thomas returned in 1990 to outpoint Curtis Isaac over 10 rounds, before being outpointed himself by the erratic and unpredictable Mike "The Bounty" Hunter. A few months later he fought Riddick Bowe and pulled out after 8 rounds. Bowe would go on to defeat Holyfield and become undisputed world heavyweight champion.

In February 1991 he took on hard hitting heavyweight Tommy Morrison but was cut and shaken up in the opening round, and the fight was stopped in between rounds. Morrison went on to win the WBO belt.

Thomas attempted one final comeback in 1992, winning twelve fights before outpointing Craig Payne. In his final fight in January 1993 he was upset by journeyman "Poncho" Carter.

A comeback fight in 1999 with old foe Tim Witherspoon was not to be, because a fight with Larry Holmes for the winner could not be confirmed.

== Retirement ==
Thomas now has a foundation, Project P.I.N.K. (Pride in Neighborhood Kids), and is a motivational speaker.

== Professional boxing record ==
51 fights	43 wins	7 losses
By knockout	34	5
By decision	9	2
Draws	1	

No.	Result	Record	Opponent	Type	Round, time	Date	Location	Notes
51	Loss	43–7–1	Lawrence Carter	TKO	7 (12), 0:47	Jan 29, 1993	Township Auditorium, Columbia, South Carolina, U.S.	For inaugural WBF (Foundation) Heavyweight Title
50	Win	43–6–1	Craig Payne	SD	12	Nov 14, 1992	Memorial Auditorium, Greenville, South Carolina, U.S.	Won inaugural IBO Heavyweight Title
49	Win	42–6–1	Mike Owens	TKO	3 (10)	Oct 22, 1992	Club Rogues, Virginia Beach, Virginia, U.S.	
48	Win	41–6–1	Dion Burgess	TKO	5 (10), 2:06	Oct 2, 1992	Robarts Arena, Sarasota, Florida, U.S.	
47	Win	40–6–1	Kevin Nesbitt	KO	1 (10)	Sep 25, 1992	Adam's Mark Hotel, Charlotte, North Carolina, U.S.	
46	Win	39–6–1	Frankie Hines	KO	1	Sep 19, 1992	Bill Sapp Recreation Center, Lumberton, North Carolina, U.S.	
45	Win	38–6–1	Larry Beilfuss	KO	1 (10)	Sep 5, 1992	Howard Johnson Hotel and Conference Center, Daytona Beach, Florida, U.S.	
44	Win	37–6–1	Adolph Davis	KO	1 (10)	Aug 22, 1992	Denver, North Carolina, U.S.	
43	Win	36–6–1	Danny Wofford	UD	10	Aug 14, 1992	Memorial Auditorium, Greenville, South Carolina, U.S.	
42	Win	35–6–1	James Smith	KO	1 (10)	Aug 8, 1992	Demopolis, Alabama, U.S.	
41	Win	34–6–1	Bobby Jones	TKO	1 (10)	Aug 1, 1992	Forest City, North Carolina, U.S.	
40	Win	33–6–1	Terry Miller	KO	2 (10)	Jul 31, 1992	Government House Hotel, Charlotte, North Carolina, U.S.	
39	Win	32–6–1	Danny Sutton	UD	10	Jun 27, 1992	Memorial Auditorium, Greenville, South Carolina, U.S.	
38	Win	31–6–1	Herman Jackson	KO	3 (10), 1:44	May 29, 1992	Memorial Auditorium, Greenville, South Carolina, U.S.	
37	Loss	30–6–1	Tommy Morrison	RTD	1 (10), 3:00	Feb 19, 1991	Kemper Arena, Kansas City, Missouri, U.S.	
36	Loss	30–5–1	Riddick Bowe	RTD	8 (10), 3:00	Sep 7, 1990	University Physical Activities Center, Washington, D.C., U.S.	
35	Loss	30–4–1	Mike Hunter	UD	10	Jun 12, 1990	Fort Bragg, North Carolina, U.S.	
34	Win	30–3–1	Curtis Isaac	UD	10	May 23, 1990	The Palace, Auburn Hills, Michigan, U.S.	
33	Loss	29–3–1	Evander Holyfield	RTD	7 (10), 3:00	Dec 9, 1988	Convention Hall, Atlantic City, New Jersey, U.S.	
32	Loss	29–2–1	Mike Tyson	TKO	6 (12), 2:00	May 30, 1987	Las Vegas Hilton, Winchester, Nevada, U.S.	For WBA and WBC heavyweight titles
31	Win	29–1–1	Danny Sutton	TKO	7 (10), 2:54	Mar 7, 1987	Las Vegas Hilton, Winchester, Nevada, U.S.	
30	Win	28–1–1	William Hosea	TKO	7 (10), 1:10	Nov 22, 1986	Las Vegas Hilton, Winchester, Nevada, U.S.	
29	Win	27–1–1	Narcisco Maldonado	KO	5 (10)	Oct 16, 1986	Aguadilla, Puerto Rico	
28	Loss	26–1–1	Trevor Berbick	UD	12	Mar 22, 1986	Riviera, Winchester, Nevada, U.S.	Lost WBC heavyweight title
27	Win	26–0–1	Mike Weaver	KO	8 (12), 1:42	Jun 15, 1985	Riviera, Winchester, Nevada, U.S.	Retained WBC heavyweight title
26	Win	25–0–1	Tim Witherspoon	MD	12	Aug 31, 1984	Riviera, Winchester, Nevada, U.S.	Won WBC heavyweight title
25	Win	24–0–1	Bruce Grandham	RTD	5 (10), 0:01	Jun 20, 1984	Roberto Clemente Coliseum, San Juan, Puerto Rico	
24	Win	23–0–1	Leroy Boone	UD	10	Oct 27, 1983	Sands, Atlantic City, New Jersey, U.S.	
23	Win	22–0–1	Michael Greer	TKO	5 (10), 1:15	Sep 24, 1983	Ice World, Totowa, New Jersey, U.S.	
22	Win	21–0–1	Alfonso Ratliff	TKO	10 (10), 2:36	Mar 26, 1983	Sands, Atlantic City, New Jersey, U.S.	
21	Draw	20–0–1	Gerrie Coetzee	MD	10	Jan 22, 1983	Sands, Atlantic City, New Jersey, U.S.	
20	Win	20–0	James Tillis	TKO	8 (10), 0:58	Aug 14, 1982	Stouffer's Inn on the Square Ballroom, Cleveland, Ohio, U.S.	
19	Win	19–0	Jerry Williams	KO	2 (10), 1:29	Jul 3, 1982	Ice World, Totowa, New Jersey, U.S.	
18	Win	18–0	Luis Acosta	RTD	2 (10), 3:00	May 23, 1982	Tropicana, Atlantic City, New Jersey, U.S.	
17	Win	17–0	Johnny Warr	PTS	8	Jan 23, 1982	Sands, Atlantic City, New Jersey, U.S.	
16	Win	16–0	Curtis Whitner	KO	2 (10)	Nov 25, 1981	Convention Hall, Philadelphia, Pennsylvania, U.S.	
15	Win	15–0	Lee Mitchell	KO	1 (10)	Apr 16, 1981	Center Arena, Seattle, Washington, U.S.	
14	Win	14–0	Jerry Williams	UD	10	Aug 28, 1980	Caesars Palace, Paradise, Nevada, U.S.	
13	Win	13–0	Frank Brown	KO	4 (10)	Jun 15, 1980	Pine Knob Music Theatre, Clarkston, Michigan, U.S.	
12	Win	12–0	Jerry Williams	RTD	5 (10), 3:00	Feb 10, 1980	Convention Center, Miami Beach, Florida, U.S.	
11	Win	11–0	Bobby Jordan	TKO	5 (10), 3:00	Dec 14, 1979	Convention Hall, Atlantic City, New Jersey, U.S.	
10	Win	10–0	Leroy Caldwell	KO	10 (10), 2:48	Jul 18, 1979	Silver Slipper, Paradise, Nevada, U.S.	
9	Win	9–0	Willie Stoglin	TKO	2 (10), 2:52	Jul 2, 1979	High School, Sedro-Woolley, Washington, U.S.	
8	Win	8–0	George Jerome	TKO	2 (8), 1:20	Jun 7, 1979	Jantzen Beach Center, Portland, Oregon, U.S.	
7	Win	7–0	Lee Holloman	KO	2 (10), 2:28	May 23, 1979	Silver Slipper, Paradise, Nevada, U.S.	
6	Win	6–0	Foma Leota	KO	2 (10)	Apr 26, 1979	Center Arena, Seattle, Washington, U.S.	
5	Win	5–0	Elmo Tex Henderson	TKO	5 (10)	Apr 4, 1979	Entertainment Trade and Recreation Arena, Billings, Montana, U.S.	
4	Win	4–0	Lew Lockwood	TKO	4 (8)	Feb 20, 1979	Center Arena, Seattle, Washington, U.S.	
3	Win	3–0	Roger Braxton	TKO	7 (8)	Jan 8, 1979	Center Arena, Seattle, Washington, U.S.	
2	Win	2–0	Mustafa El Amin	TKO	3 (6)	Oct 31, 1978	Saint Martin's University Gym, Lacey, Washington, U.S.	
1	Win	1–0	Ken Arlt	SD	6	Aug 29, 1978	Center Arena, Seattle, Washington, U.S.	

Sporting positions
Minor world boxing titles
IBO heavyweight champion November 14, 1992 – January 1993; Vacated	Vacant Title next held by Lionel Butler	
Major world boxing titles
Preceded by Tim Witherspoon	WBC heavyweight champion August 31, 1984 – March 22, 1986	Succeeded by Trevor Berbick
