= Rocky Marciano vs. Roland La Starza =

Boxing match

- Date: March 24, 1950
- Venue: Madison Square Garden, New York City, New York, U.S.

Tale of the tape
Boxer	(United States) Rocky Marciano	(United States) Roland La Starza
Nickname	"The Brockton Blockbuster"	"The Bronx Express"
Hometown	Brockton, Massachusetts	The Bronx, New York
Purse	$8,000	$13,000
Pre-fight record	25–0 (22 KO)	37–0 (17 KO)
Age	26 years, 6 months	22 years, 10 months
Height	5 ft 10 in (178 cm)	6 ft 0 in (183 cm)
Weight	183 1/4 lb (83 kg)	187 lb (85 kg)
Style	Orthodox	Orthodox
Recognition		The Ring; No. 10 Ranked Heavyweight

Result
- Marciano defeats La Starza by split decision

Rocky Marciano vs. Roland La Starza was a professional boxing match contested on March 24, 1950.

Rocky won by a narrow split decision in what is regarded as one of Marciano's closest fights.

== Background ==
The two men first fought each other in a scheduled 10 round fight on March 24, 1950, at Madison Square Garden. At the time going into the fight, both men were young and undefeated rising stars, garnering much public interest from boxing fans. Marciano's record going into the fight was 25–0 with 23 knockouts and La Starza's was 37–0 with 18 knockouts.

== The fight ==
The fight saw both men's clashing styles, with Marciano being the aggressor attempting to knockout his opponent, while La Starza put his footwork and counter punching to work in an attempt to neutralize Rocky's pressure. The fight was very close and went the distance, with the final scorecards reading 5–4, 4-5 and 5-5 respectively. This could have resulted in the fight being declared a draw, but New York had a rule that allowed the referee to award one extra point in order to break ties, and awarded the point to Marciano on account of his aggression and scoring the fight's only knockdown (a right hook floored LaStarza in the 4th round). The split decision victory was one of Marciano's closest fights during his entire career.

== Aftermath ==
La Starza felt he was robbed of victory, and even went on record in the New York Herald Tribune, March 25, 1950, as saying, "The fact is [Rocky’s] manager Al Weill was matchmaker for the Garden. I would say that had a lot to do with the decision." He maintained that belief for over 50 years after the bout.

After the fight both men went their separate ways and continued to rise through the ranks. Marciano scored knockout wins over several top contenders including former champions Joe Louis and Lee Savold, before taking the world heavyweight title from Jersey Joe Walcott in 1952.

After his first defeat, La Starza went on to win 16 more fights, and lost two (both of which he avenged, leaving Rocky as the only one of his opponents he still had yet to beat). In 1953 he defeated top contender Rex Layne which earned him a title shot against Marciano later that year. It would be the champion's second title defense after winning a rematch with Walcott earlier that year.

== Undercard ==
Confirmed bouts:

Preceded by vs. Carmine Vingo	Rocky Marciano's bouts 24 March 1950	Succeeded by vs. Eldridge Eatman
Preceded by vs. César Brion	Roland La Starza's bouts 24 March 1950	Succeeded by vs. Jimmy Walls
