= Rocky Marciano vs. Roland La Starza II =

Boxing match

- Date: September 24, 1953
- Venue: Polo Grounds, New York City, New York, U.S.
- Title(s) on the line: NYSAC, NBA and The Ring undisputed heavyweight championship

Tale of the tape
Boxer	Rocky Marciano	Roland La Starza
Nickname	"The Brockton Blockbuster"	"The Bronx Express"
Hometown	Brockton, Massachusetts, U.S.	The Bronx, New York, U.S.
Pre-fight record	44–0 (39 KO)	53–3 (24 KO)
Age	30 years	26 years, 4 months
Height	5 ft 10 in (178 cm)	6 ft 0 in (183 cm)
Weight	185 lb (84 kg)	184 3/4 lb (84 kg)
Style	Orthodox	Orthodox
Recognition	NYSAC, NBA, and The Ring; Undisputed Heavyweight Champion	NBA; No. 3 Ranked Heavyweight; The Ring; No. 7 Ranked Heavyweight

Result
- Marciano defeats La Starza by 11th round TKO

Rocky Marciano vs. Roland La Starza II was a professional boxing match contested on September 24, 1953, for the undisputed heavyweight championship.

== Background ==
In 1950 undefeated contenders Rocky Marciano and Roland La Starza fought a highly competitive 10 round bout won by Marciano with a somewhat controversial split decision. Following the bout both men continued to rise through the ranks. Marciano scored knockout wins over several top contenders including former champion Joe Louis before taking the world heavyweight title from Jersey Joe Walcott in 1952.

After his first defeat, La Starza went on to win 16 more fights, and lost two (both of which he avenged, leaving Rocky as the only one of his opponents he still had yet to beat). In February 1953 he defeated top contender Rex Layne which earned him a title shot against Marciano later that year. The fight was made official on 15 July and was to take place on 24 September at the Polo Grounds in Manhattan.

Marciano was favored 4–1 to defeat his old rival.

== The fight ==
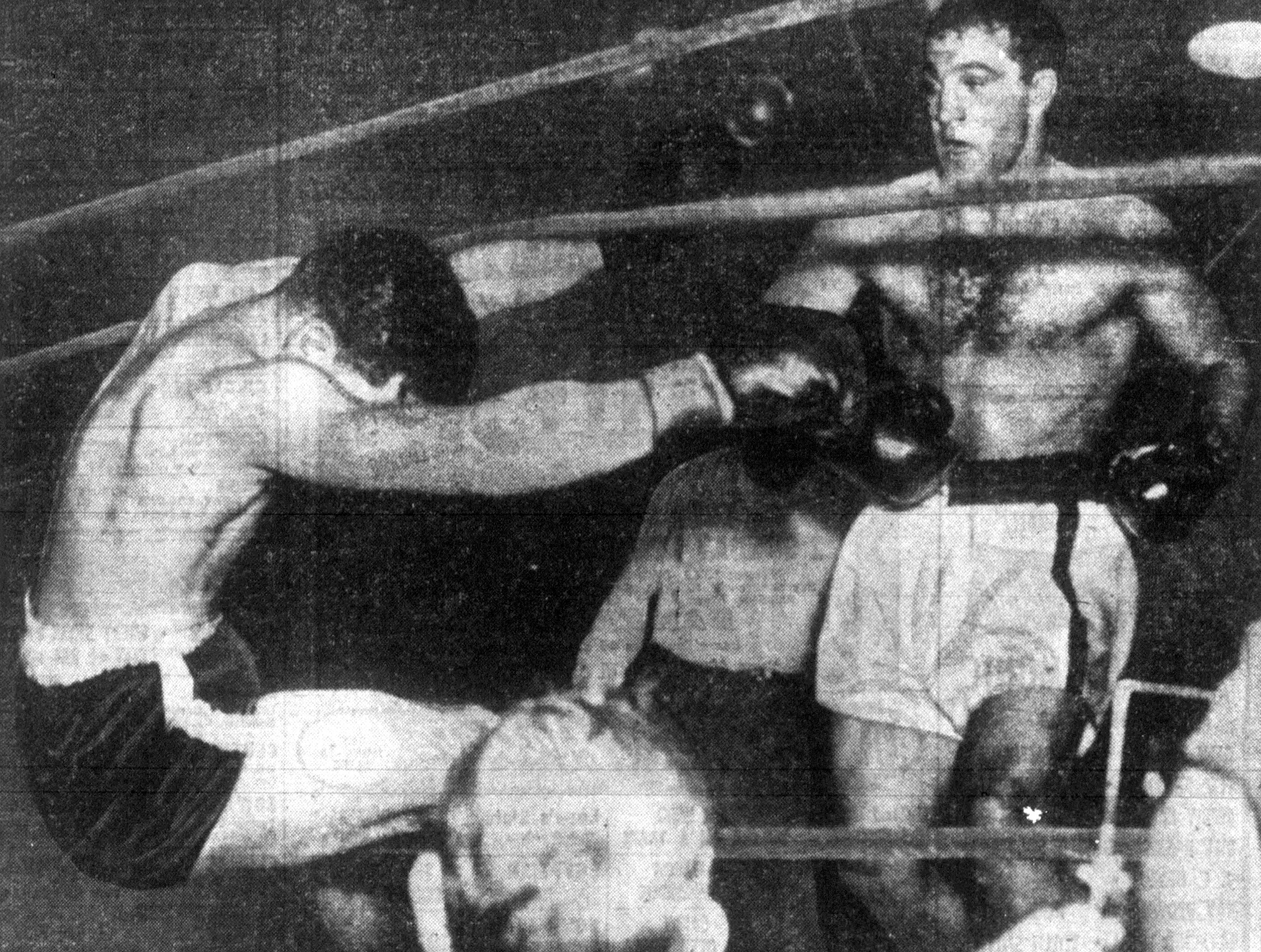
Marciano sends La Starza through the ropes in the 11th round of their 1953 rematch

La Starza started off the fight well, cleverly boxing while mostly on the retreat from the ever approaching champion, and effectively clinched when he got too close. Rocky started off in awkward fashion, missing often while gunning for an early knockout, possibly suffering from ring rust having only fought one professional round during the entire year leading up to the fight.

At several points La Starza complained that Marciano was fouling, and the champion even lost the 6th round due to this, but by the mid rounds the momentum of the fight turned in Marciano’s favor. The champion’s constant pressure began to beat the challenger down, landing heavy blows to the head, body and even La Starza's arms (which made it increasingly difficult to properly defend himself). By round 10, LaStarza was badly beaten, spitting blood and had several cuts on his face, but gamely fought on.

One minute into round 11, a solid left–right combination by the champion sent LaStarza backwards through the ropes and out of the ring. The challenger beat the count, but Marciano went in for the finish, landing several more hard blows before referee Ruby Goldstein stopped the fight.

The TKO was the champion's 40th knockout and the first time La Starza was ever stopped in the ring.

== Aftermath ==
LaStarza was never the same after the title fight. The punches to his arms left them so badly injured that he had to get surgery to repair the damaged bones, muscles and nerves. Although he fought nine more times, he lost five of them (including a loss to future Marciano opponent Don Cockell) before finally retiring from boxing in 1961. LaStarza also pursued a career in acting, playing minor roles in several movies and television shows. Although he never achieved the same level of success that Marciano did, he was one of the champion's toughest opponents.

The bout was declared 1953's Fight of the Year by The Ring, the second in row featuring Marciano.

== Undercard ==
Confirmed bouts:

Preceded by vs. Jersey Joe Walcott II	Rocky Marciano's bouts 24 September 1953	Succeeded by vs. Ezzard Charles
Preceded by vs. Rex Layne	Roland La Starza's bouts 24 September 1953	Succeeded by vs. Don Cockell
Awards
Previous: Jersey Joe Walcott vs. Rocky Marciano	The Ring Fight of the Year; 1953	Succeeded by Rocky Marciano vs. Ezzard Charles II
