= Rocky Marciano vs. Ezzard Charles =

Boxing match

Battle of Punching Champions
- Date: June 17, 1954
- Venue: Yankee Stadium, New York City, New York, U.S.
- Title(s) on the line: NYSAC, NBA and The Ring undisputed heavyweight championship

Tale of the tape
Boxer	(United States) Rocky Marciano	(United States) Ezzard Charles
Nickname	"The Brockton Blockbuster"	"The Cincinnati Cobra"
Hometown	Brockton, Massachusetts	Cincinnati, Ohio
Pre-fight record	45–0 (40 KO)	85–10–1 (49 KO)
Age	30 years, 9 months	32 years, 11 months
Height	5 ft 10 in (178 cm)	6 ft 0 in (183 cm)
Weight	187 1/2 lb (85 kg)	185 1/2 lb (84 kg)
Style	Orthodox	Orthodox
Recognition	NYSAC, NBA, and The Ring; Undisputed Heavyweight Champion	NBA; No. 1 Ranked Heavyweight; The Ring; No. 2 Ranked Heavyweight; Former undisputed heavyweight champion

Result
- Marciano won via 15 round UD

Rocky Marciano vs. Ezzard Charles, billed as Battle of Punching Champions, was a professional boxing match contested on 17 June 1954, for the undisputed heavyweight championship.

The fight was held at Yankee Stadium in New York City and went the distance with Marciano winning on points through a unanimous decision.

== Background ==
Charles had previously held the heavyweight title, from 1949 (following Joe Louis' retirement) to his loss to Jersey Joe Walcott in 1951. Marciano won the title the following year in 1952. Charles went on to win a title eliminator over Bob Satterfield in January 1954 before facing the champion in June. It was Marciano's third title defense.

Charles was attempting to become the first man in history to regain the undisputed heavyweight championship.

Marciano was guaranteed 40% from the ticket sales revenue and Charles was guaranteed 20%.

== The fight ==
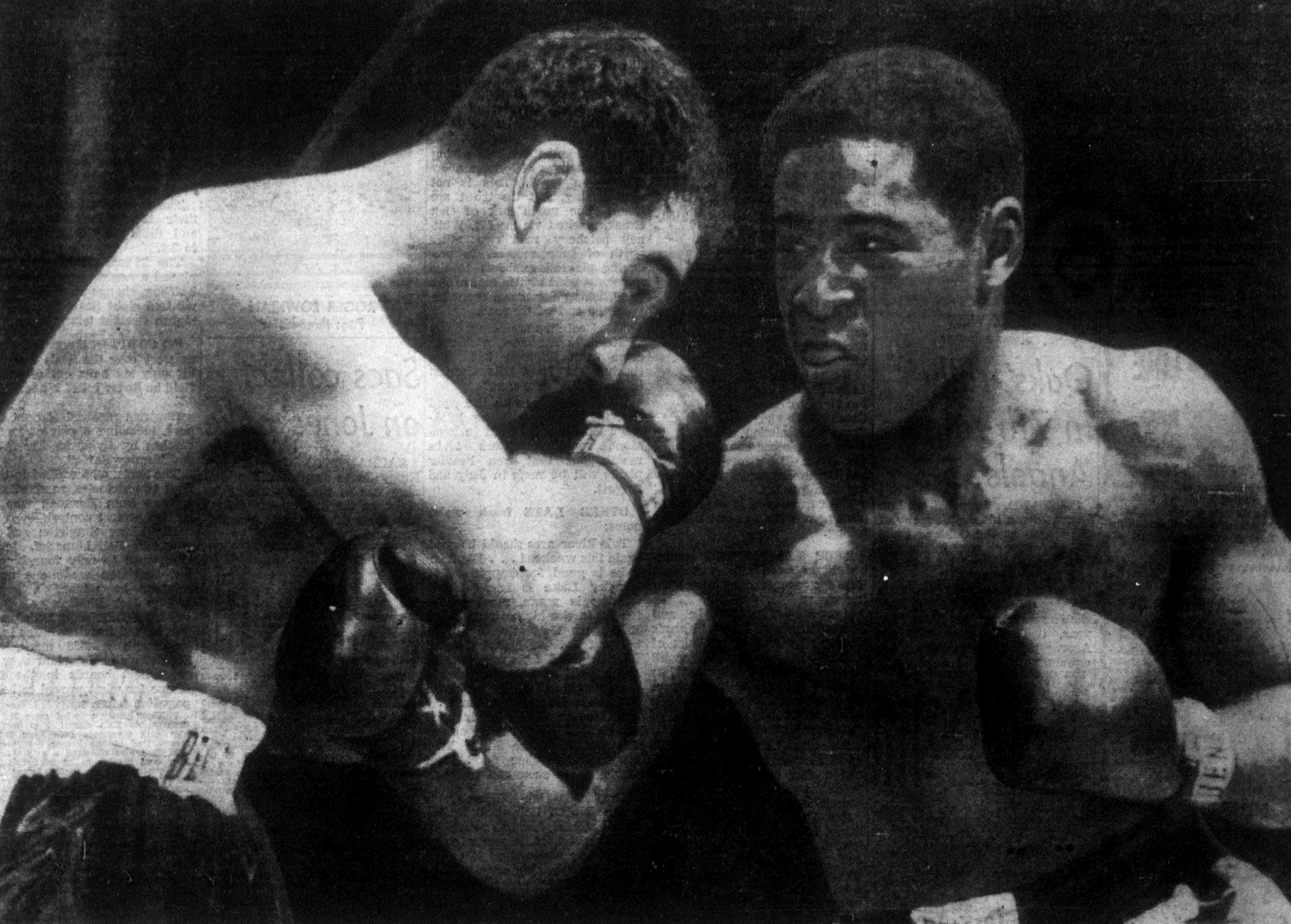
Charles (right) fails to connect on a body shot to Marciano (left)

=== Rounds 1–4 ===
The first four rounds of the first Marciano–Charles bout revealed Charles's superior technical expertise. Marciano was outfought and outmaneuvered in these early rounds. Charles threw body shots at Marciano with great success; he also opened a two inch long and one inch deep cut over Marciano's left eye. Marciano's cut man Freddie Brown, who later worked for Roberto Durán, would comment that he could not remember treating a cut worse than this one.

=== Rounds 5–9 ===
In the fifth round, Charles surprisingly became defensive and stopped dictating the pace of the fight. In the early rounds, Charles had thrown body punches at Marciano with great success; by the fifth round Charles was no longer throwing these punches. Without making any effort to protect his eye, Marciano carried the fight to Charles, went on the offensive, found his rhythm, and seized the initiative in the fight. By the end of round 9, Marciano's face was a crimson mask, and yet he had managed to land so many punches on Charles that he was ahead in the scoring.

=== Rounds 10–15 ===
By the 10th round, Marciano was clearly ahead and yet he kept fighting as if the decision was in doubt, and kept trying for a knockout. Charles managed to stay on his feet while withstanding Marciano's punches, but his face gradually started changing for the worse. His right eye closed, his lower lip was split and swollen, and a blood clot appeared on his left jaw.

At the end Marciano won the fight with a unanimous decision (scored 8-5, 9-5 and 8-6 in favor of the champion).

== Aftermath ==
Speaking after the bout Marciano said "He gave me a helluva fight. He deserves a return fight if he wants it. It was as tough as my first fight with Jersey Joe Walcott, maybe tougher." Charles meanwhile immediately called for a rematch "I want him again, I thought I won. I think I came closer to knocking him out than he did me. The next time it will be different."

Ruby Goldstein, who refereed this fight, commented:

Charles was a very good, smart fighter, who still employed the tactics he had as a middleweight.He gave Marciano trouble for the first ten rounds.He came at him fast with an assortment of punches, and he hit Rocky with a lot of combinations where he'd put together five or six punches in a row.Most fighters would grab on and wait for their head to clear after being hit by a good combination. But this is where Marciano was a discouraging-type fighter. After a fighter hit him with some of his best punches, Rocky would come chasing right back after him, back him up against the ropes, and throw seven or eight punches of his own.

=== Rematch ===
The two men would rematch on 17 September 1954, with Marciano knocking out Charles in the eighth round.

== Undercard ==
Confirmed bouts:

Preceded by vs. Roland La Starza II	Rocky Marciano's bouts 17 June 1954	Succeeded by Rematch
Preceded by vs. Bob Satterfield	Ezzard Charles's bouts 17 June 1954	Succeeded by Rematch
