= Roland La Starza =

American boxer

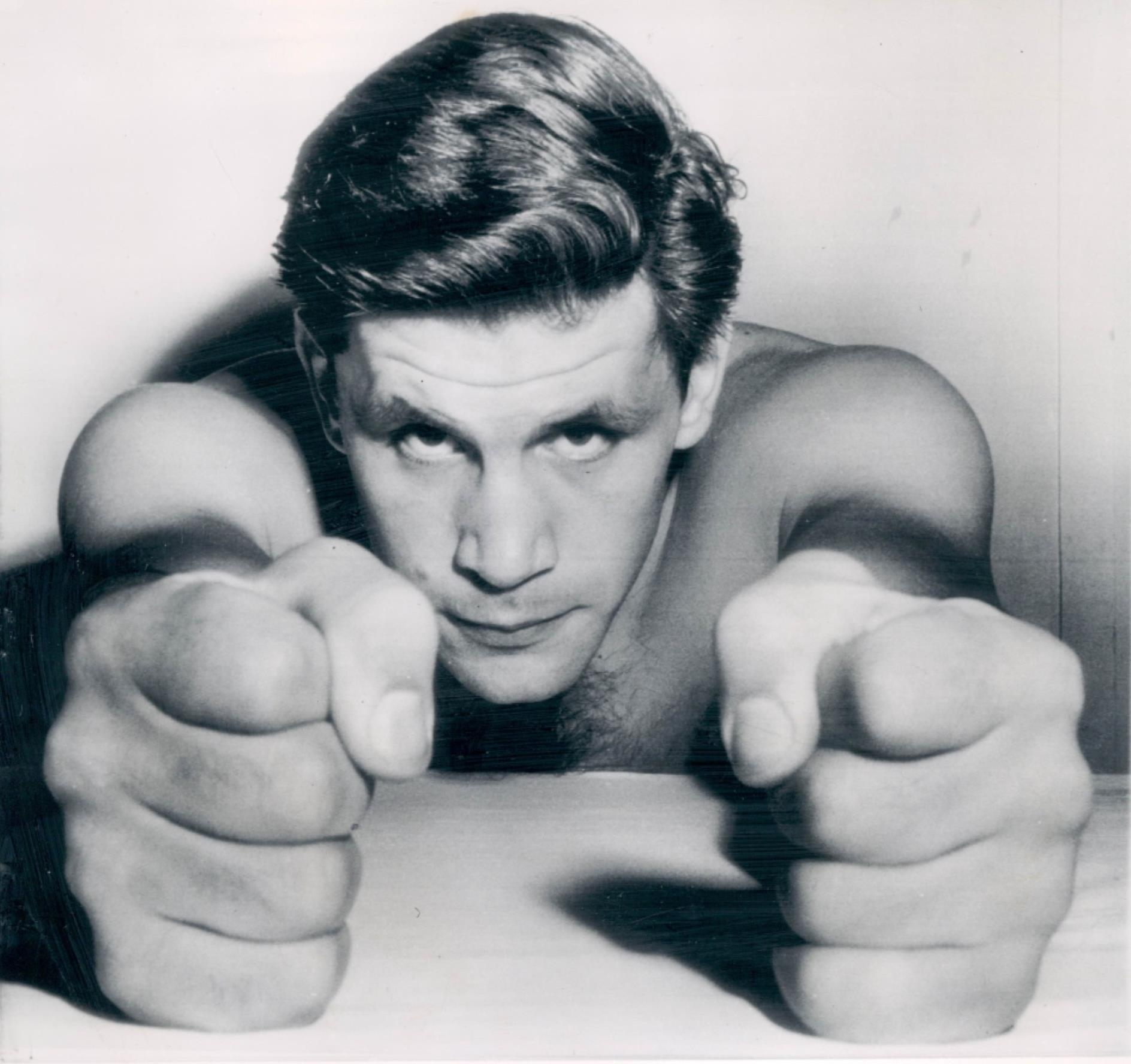
- La Starza in 1953

Personal information
- Nationality: American
- Born: May 12, 1927 The Bronx
- Died: September 30, 2009 (aged 82) Port Orange, Florida
- Height: 6 ft 0 in (1.83 m)
- Weight: Heavyweight

Boxing career
- Reach: 72 in (183 cm)
- Stance: Orthodox

Boxing record
- Total fights: 66
- Wins: 57
- Win by KO: 27
- Losses: 9

Roland La Starza (May 12, 1927 – September 30, 2009) was an American boxer and actor. La Starza was a top rated heavyweight contender in the early 1950s and is famous for his two fights with heavyweight champion Rocky Marciano.

== Biography ==
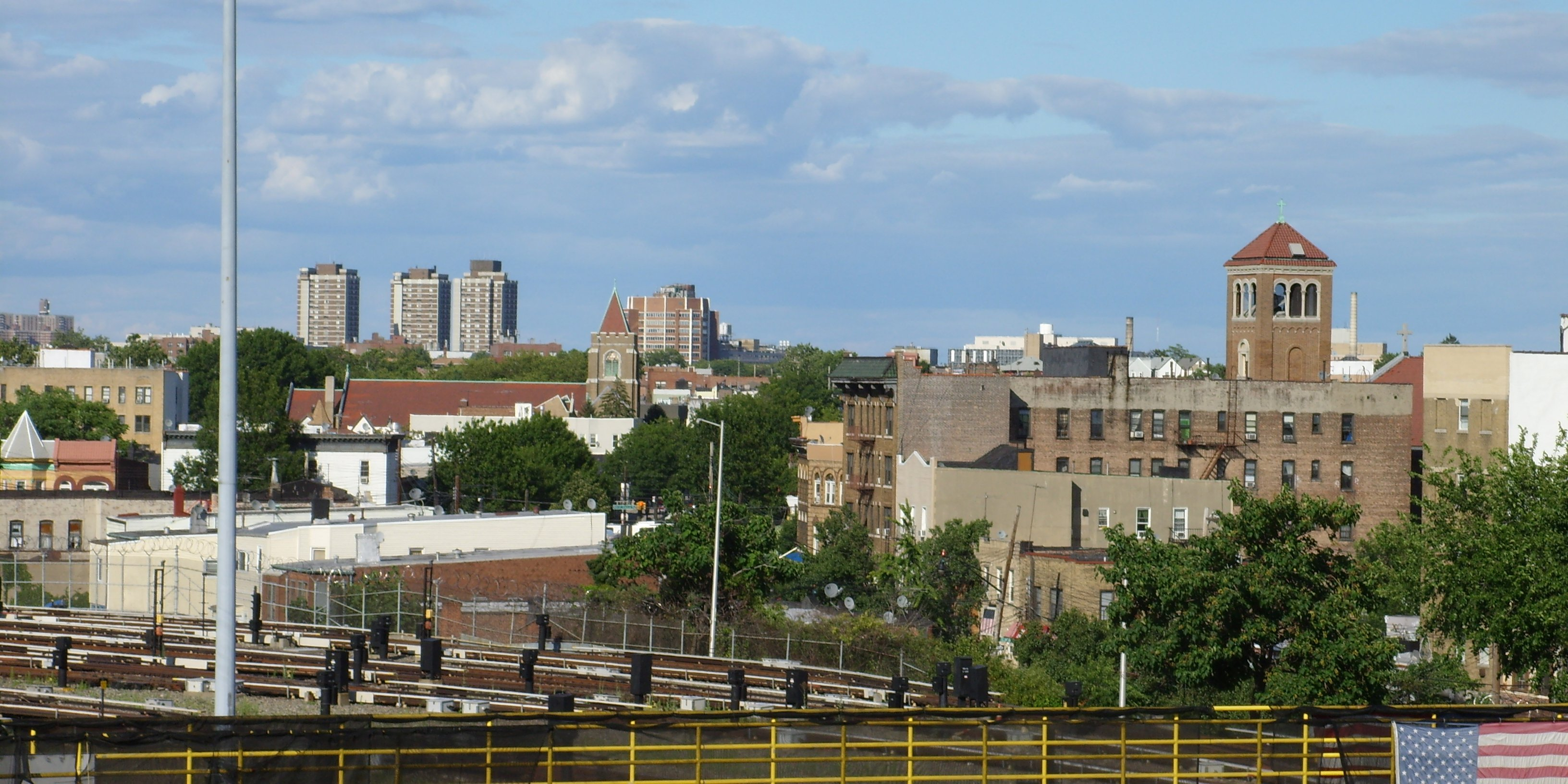
La Starza was born and raised in the Van Nest neighborhood of New York City

=== Early life and career ===
Born in 1927, La Starza grew up in the Van Nest section of the Bronx. La Starza’s skills for boxing showed early, and he would become a very crafty out-boxer and counterpuncher. He had a very successful amateur career, winning five Golden Gloves titles in New York in 1944 and 1945. He began his professional career on July 7, 1947, and in less than three years, put together an undefeated record of 37 straight victories. This would line him up for a fight with another undefeated, rising heavyweight.

=== Fights with Marciano ===
La Starza and Rocky Marciano met for the first time in Madison Square Garden on March 24, 1950. La Straza fought well, and although the fight went against him on a split decision, La Starza may have come closer than any other boxer to defeating Marciano. The scoring for the bout was 5–4, 4–5, and 5–5, but La Starza lost on a supplemental point system used by New York and Massachusetts at that time (which was awarded to Marciano on account of him scoring the fight’s only knockdown). La Starza felt he was robbed of victory, and even went on record in the New York Herald Tribune, March 25, 1950, as saying, "The fact is [Rocky’s] manager Al Weill was matchmaker for the Garden. I would say that had a lot to do with the decision." He maintained that belief for over 50 years after the bout.

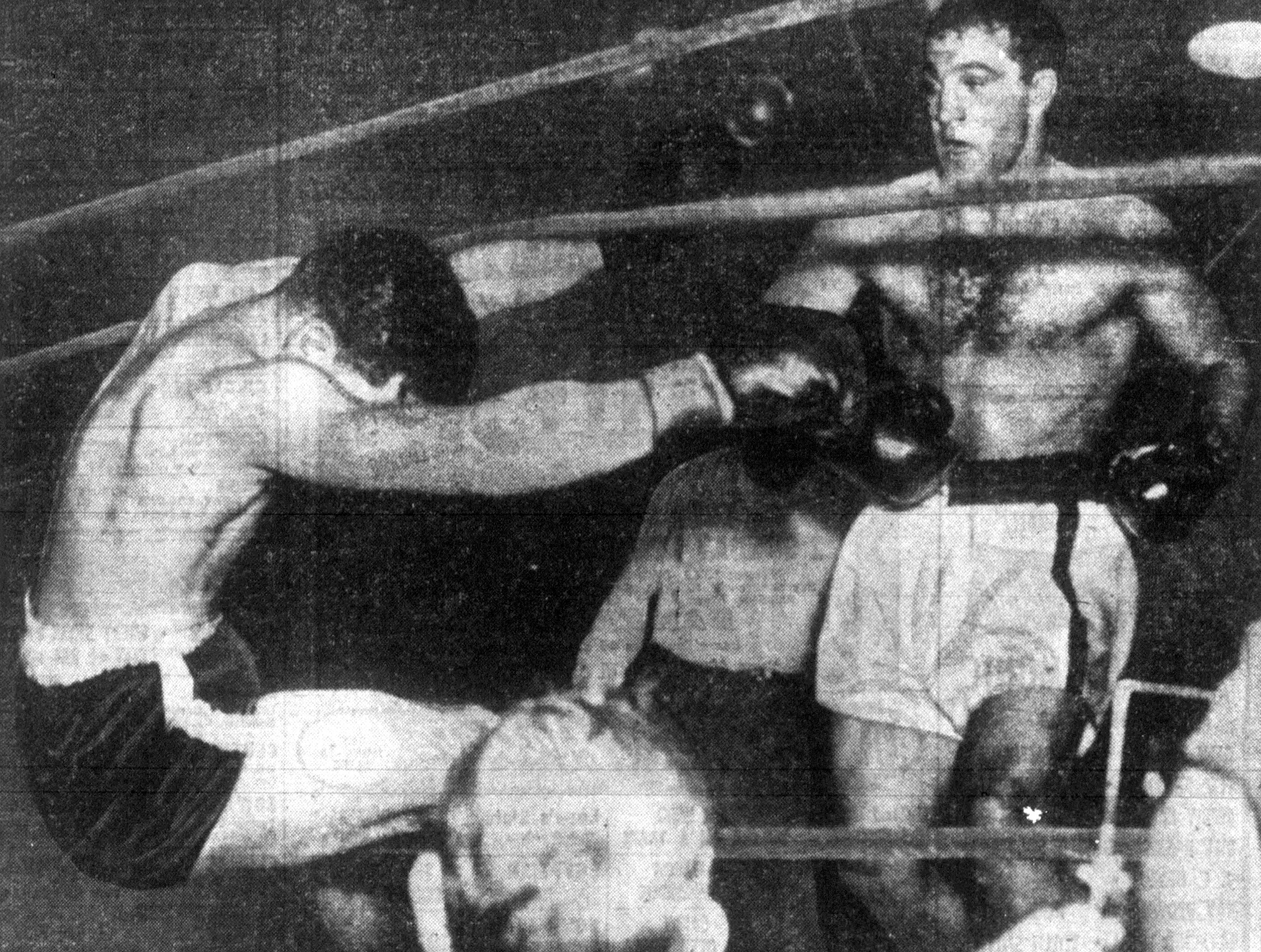
La Starza (left) is sent through the ropes during his title fight

Over the next three years, La Starza fought 18 more times, (losing on points to Dan Bucceroni and Rocky Jones, before avenging both losses in 1952), and eventually won a heavyweight title eliminator against Rex Layne in early 1953. This set himself up for what would be the most important fight of his career: a world heavyweight championship bout which was also a rematch against Marciano on September 24, 1953. The fight took place in an outdoor venue—the Polo Grounds in New York City. La Starza fought Marciano quite well for the first six rounds, but began to wear down as he took more punishment. In the 11th round, Marciano had knocked La Starza through the ropes. La Starza beat Goldstein's count, but the referee stopped the fight shortly thereafter on a TKO as Marciano battered La Starza relentlessly. This was the first of only two times La Starza was stopped during his career.

=== Later career ===
Following the title bout, La Starza was hospitalized for injuries sustained during the fight, and required surgery to treat the damage done to his arms. He continued his boxing career but was never the same again. He lost his next match in March 1954 to British champion Don Cockell, and went on to lose half of his subsequent eight fights. La Starza finally retired after his final fight on May 8, 1961. During his over 14 year long career, he fought a total of 446 rounds in 66 professional fights, and won 57 of them with 27 by knockout.

After his boxing career La Starza appeared on television in a number of stereotypical tough-guy roles. His biggest break was a regular role as Pvt. Ernie Lucavich on the short-lived World War II series The Gallant Men. He also did guest appearances on various shows including 77 Sunset Strip, The Wild Wild West and Perry Mason. He appeared in two episodes (13 and 14) of the Batman series of the 1960s, and appeared in movies including Point Blank (1967) and The Outfit (1973).

He, his wife (Jane) and two children (Amy and Mark) left California to retire at their family's cattle ranch outside of New Smyrna Beach, Florida, in 1972.

La Starza died on September 30, 2009, in Port Orange, Florida, at the age of 82.

== Professional boxing record ==
66 fights	57 wins	9 losses
By knockout	27	2
By decision	30	7
Draws	0	

No.	Result	Record	Opponent	Type	Round, time	Date	Location	Notes
66	Loss	57–9	Monroe Ratliff	UD	10	May 8, 1961	Kezar Pavilion, San Francisco, California, U.S.	
65	Win	57–8	Ike Thomas	TKO	3 (8), 2:20	Dec 21, 1960	Plaza Ballroom, Paterson, New Jersey, U.S.	
64	Win	56–8	Danny Logan	TKO	7 (8), 0:45	Nov 30, 1960	Plaza Ballroom, Paterson, New Jersey, U.S.	
63	Loss	55–8	Larry Zernitz	SD	10	Dec 1, 1958	St. Nicholas Arena, Manhattan, New York, U.S.	
62	Win	55–7	Al Anderson	SD	10	Oct 8, 1957	Valley Arena, Holyoke, Massachusetts, U.S.	
61	Win	54–7	Jimmy McMillan	TKO	3 (10)	Jun 11, 1957	Sam Houston Coliseum, Houston, Texas, U.S.	
60	Loss	53–7	Julio Mederos	KO	5 (10), 1:37	Mar 2, 1955	Stadium, Miami, Florida, U.S.	
59	Loss	53–6	Charley Norkus	UD	10	Dec 1, 1954	Arena, Cleveland, Ohio, U.S.	
58	Loss	53–5	Don Cockell	PTS	10	Mar 30, 1954	Earls Court Arena, London, England	
57	Loss	53–4	Rocky Marciano	TKO	11 (15)	Sep 24, 1953	Polo Grounds, Manhattan, New York, U.S.	For NYSAC, NBA and The Ring heavyweight titles
56	Win	53–3	Rex Layne	SD	10	Feb 13, 1953	Madison Square Garden, Manhattan, New York, U.S.	
55	Win	52–3	Rocky Jones	UD	10	Dec 1, 1952	Eastern Parkway Arena, Brooklyn, New York, U.S.	
54	Loss	51–3	Rocky Jones	UD	10	Oct 9, 1952	Armory, Akron, Ohio, U.S.	
53	Win	51–2	Dan Bucceroni	UD	10	May 13, 1952	Madison Square Garden, Manhattan, New York, U.S.	
52	Win	50–2	Joe McFadden	TKO	5 (10), 2:07	Apr 18, 1952	St. Nicholas Arena, Manhattan, New York, U.S.	
51	Win	49–2	Ralph Schneider	UD	10	Feb 13, 1952	Auditorium, Miami Beach, Florida, U.S.	
50	Win	48–2	Bill Wilson	KO	4 (10), 1:46	Feb 1, 1952	Legion Arena, West Palm Beach, Florida, U.S.	
49	Loss	47–2	Dan Bucceroni	UD	10	Dec 21, 1951	Madison Square Garden, Manhattan, New York, U.S.	
48	Win	47–1	Ted Lowry	UD	10	Aug 3, 1951	Stadium, Long Beach, New York, U.S.	
47	Win	46–1	Gene Felton	KO	3 (10)	Jun 11, 1951	Coliseum, Baltimore, Maryland, U.S.	
46	Win	45–1	Vern Mitchell	TKO	8 (10), 1:38	May 4, 1951	St. Nicholas Arena, Manhattan, New York, U.S.	
45	Win	44–1	Keene Simmons	UD	10	Mar 12, 1951	Rhode Island Auditorium, Providence, Rhode Island, U.S.	
44	Win	43–1	Curt Kennedy	TKO	6 (10), 2:26	Feb 5, 1951	Rhode Island Auditorium, Providence, Rhode Island, U.S.	
43	Win	42–1	Ted Lowry	UD	10	Jan 15, 1951	Rhode Island Auditorium, Providence, Rhode Island, U.S.	
42	Win	41–1	Duilio Spagnolo	UD	10	Oct 20, 1950	St. Nicholas Arena, Manhattan, New York, U.S.	
41	Win	40–1	Keene Simmons	UD	8	Aug 25, 1950	Stadium, Long Beach, New York, U.S.	
40	Win	39–1	Georgie Fuller	TKO	9 (10), 1:50	May 13, 1950	Mara's Arena, Waterbury, Connecticut, U.S.	
39	Win	38–1	Jimmy Walls	KO	3 (10), 0:58	May 1, 1950	Valley Arena, Holyoke, Massachusetts, U.S.	
38	Loss	37–1	Rocky Marciano	SD	10	Mar 24, 1950	Madison Square Garden, Manhattan, New York, U.S.	
37	Win	37–0	César Brion	UD	10	Dec 2, 1949	Madison Square Garden, Manhattan, New York, U.S.	
36	Win	36–0	Walter Hafer	KO	9 (10), 2:26	Oct 29, 1949	St. Nicholas Arena, Manhattan, New York, U.S.	
35	Win	35–0	Joe Dominic	PTS	6	Sep 2, 1949	Stadium, Long Beach, New York, U.S.	
34	Win	34–0	Jackie Lyons	TKO	5 (10)	Jul 29, 1949	Stadium, Long Beach, New York, U.S.	
33	Win	33–0	Harry Haft	TKO	4 (8), 0:25	Jun 27, 1949	Coney Island Velodrome, Brooklyn, New York, U.S.	
32	Win	32–0	Jimmy Carollo	UD	10	Jun 9, 1949	Queensboro Arena, Queens, New York, U.S.	
31	Win	31–0	Eldridge Eatman	UD	8	Apr 28, 1949	Sunnyside Garden, Queens, New York, U.S.	
30	Win	30–0	Gino Buonvino	TKO	6 (10), 0:32	Feb 25, 1949	Madison Square Garden, Manhattan, New York, U.S.	
29	Win	29–0	Bill Weinberg	PTS	8	Jan 14, 1949	Madison Square Garden, Manhattan, New York, U.S.	
28	Win	28–0	Gene Gosney	TKO	7 (8), 1:03	Dec 10, 1948	Madison Square Garden, Manhattan, New York, U.S.	
27	Win	27–0	Don Mogard	UD	8	Nov 6, 1948	Ridgewood Grove, Brooklyn, New York, U.S.	
26	Win	26–0	Mike Jacobs	PTS	6	Oct 20, 1948	Jamaica Arena, Queens, New York, U.S.	
25	Win	25–0	Don Mogard	PTS	6	Sep 23, 1948	Yankee Stadium, The Bronx, New York, U.S.	
24	Win	24–0	Mel McKinney	KO	4 (8), 1:29	Aug 30, 1948	Queensboro Arena, Queens, New York, U.S.	
23	Win	23–0	Teddy Georges	TKO	2 (6), 1:16	Aug 17, 1948	MacArthur Stadium, Brooklyn, New York, U.S.	
22	Win	22–0	Oscar Goode	TKO	4 (8,) 1:29	Jul 27, 1948	MacArthur Stadium, Brooklyn, New York, U.S.	
21	Win	21–0	Tony Gangemi	UD	8	Jul 14, 1948	Jerome Stadium, The Bronx, New York, U.S.	
20	Win	20–0	Benny Rusk	PTS	6	Jun 25, 1948	Yankee Stadium, The Bronx, New York, U.S.	
19	Win	19–0	Freddie McManus	UD	6	May 4, 1948	Park Arena, The Bronx, New York, U.S.	
18	Win	18–0	John Holloway	TKO	5 (6), 1:31	Apr 24, 1948	Ridgewood Grove, Brooklyn, New York, U.S.	
17	Win	17–0	Claude McClintock	PTS	6	Apr 7, 1948	State Armory, Bridgeport, Connecticut, U.S.	
16	Win	16–0	Steve King	PTS	6	Mar 19, 1948	Madison Square Garden, Manhattan, New York, U.S.	
15	Win	15–0	Jimmy White	KO	2 (6), 0:29	Feb 24, 1948	Park Arena, The Bronx, New York, U.S.	
14	Win	14–0	Frankie Reed	TKO	4 (6)	Feb 14, 1948	Ridgewood Grove, Brooklyn, New York, U.S.	
13	Win	13–0	Mike Belluscio	PTS	6	Jan 30, 1948	Madison Square Garden, Manhattan, New York, U.S.	
12	Win	12–0	Luther McMillan	PTS	6	Dec 23, 1947	Park Arena, The Bronx, New York, U.S.	
11	Win	11–0	Fred Ramsey	TKO	4 (6), 1:01	Dec 13, 1947	Ridgewood Grove, Brooklyn, New York, U.S.	
10	Win	10–0	Matt Mincy	PTS	6	Dec 1, 1947	St. Nicholas Arena, Manhattan, New York, U.S.	
9	Win	9–0	Lorne McCarthy	PTS	6	Nov 11, 1947	Park Arena, The Bronx, New York, U.S.	
8	Win	8–0	Jimmy Evans	PTS	6	Oct 31, 1947	Madison Square Garden, Manhattan, New York, U.S.	
7	Win	7–0	Matt Mincy	PTS	6	Oct 21, 1947	Park Arena, The Bronx, New York, U.S.	
6	Win	6–0	Zeke Brown	KO	1 (6), 1:04	Oct 10, 1947	St. Nicholas Arena, Manhattan, New York, U.S.	
5	Win	5–0	Jim Johnson	KO	1 (6)	Sep 9, 1947	Jerome Stadium, The Bronx, New York, U.S.	
4	Win	4–0	Jimmy Dodd	TKO	4 (6), 3:00	Aug 25, 1947	Queensboro Arena, Queens, New York, U.S.	
3	Win	3–0	Al Zappala	KO	5 (6)	Aug 12, 1947	Jerome Stadium, The Bronx, New York, U.S.	
2	Win	2–0	Zack Johnson	KO	6 (6), 0:49	Jul 15, 1947	Jerome Stadium, The Bronx, New York, U.S.	
1	Win	1–0	Dave Glanton	PTS	6	Jul 7, 1947	Queensboro Arena, Queens, New York, U.S.	

== Filmography ==
Year	Title	Role	Notes
1962	Convicts 4	Duke	
1966	A Fine Madness	Angie - Sparrer	Uncredited
1967	The Big Mouth	Jack - Motorcycle Officer	Uncredited
1967	Point Blank	Reese's Guard	
1970	Which Way to the Front?	Von Krebs	Uncredited
1973	Incident on a Dark Street	Sonny	
1973	The Outfit	Hit Man #2	
1973	The Don Is Dead	Mert Shansky	Uncredited, (final film role)
