= Rocky Marciano =

American boxer (1923–1969)

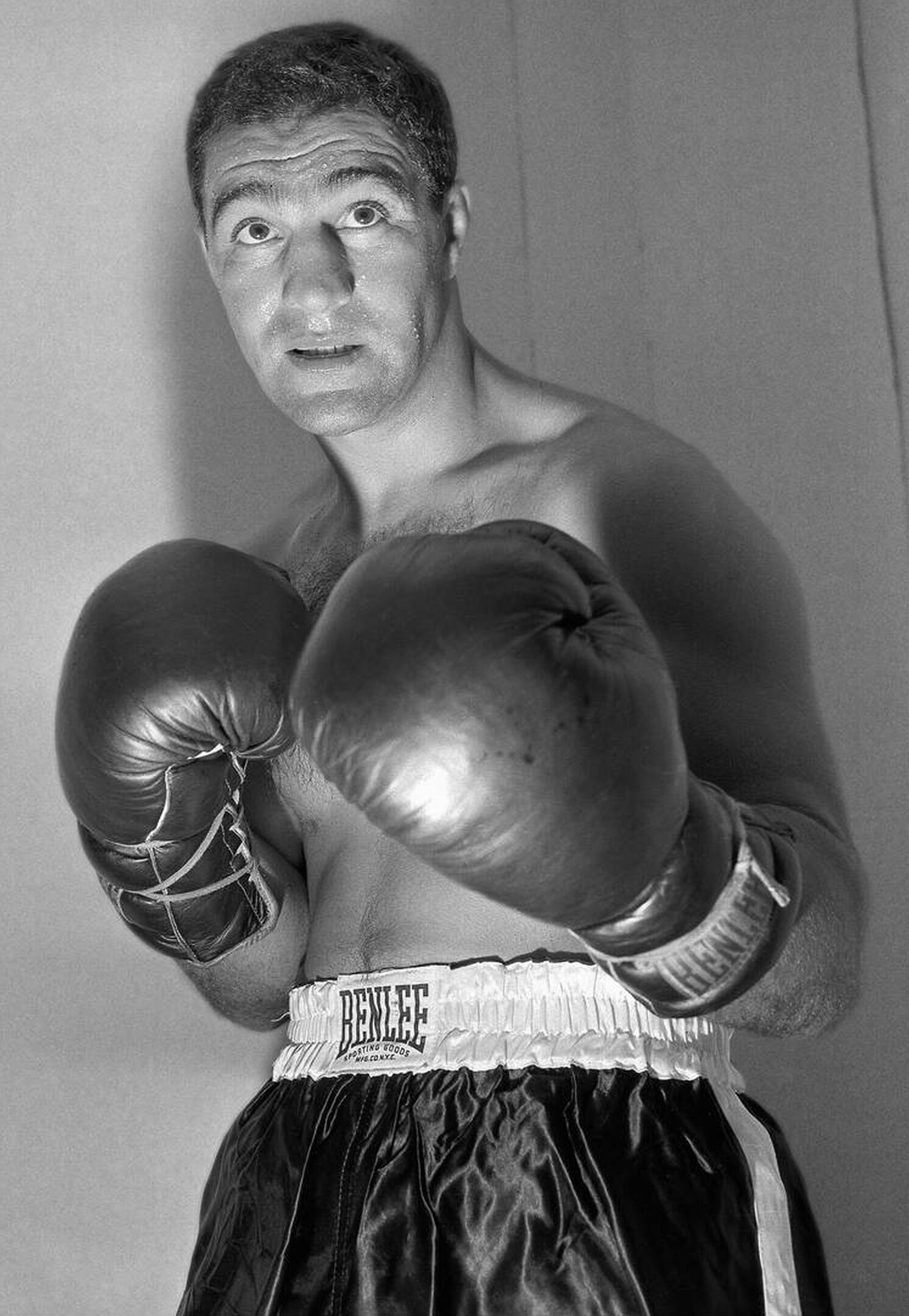
- Marciano in 1952

Personal information
- Nicknames: The Brockton Blockbuster; The Rock from Brockton
- Born: Rocco Francis Marchegiano; September 1, 1923 Brockton, Massachusetts, U.S.
- Died: August 31, 1969 (aged 45) Newton, Iowa, U.S.
- Height: 5 ft 10 in (178 cm) (Note: Also reported about 5 ft 9 in)
- Weight: Heavyweight

Boxing career
- Reach: 67 in (170 cm)
- Stance: Orthodox

Boxing record
- Total fights: 49
- Wins: 49
- Win by KO: 43

Rocco Francis Marchegiano (September 1, 1923 – August 31, 1969; Italian pronunciation: [markeˈdʒaːno]), better known as Rocky Marciano (/mɑːrsiˈɑːnoʊ/, Italian: [marˈtʃaːno]), was an American professional boxer who competed from 1947 to 1955. He held the world heavyweight championship from 1952 to 1956, and remains the only heavyweight champion to finish his career undefeated. His six title defenses were against Jersey Joe Walcott (from whom he had taken the title), Roland La Starza, Ezzard Charles (twice), Don Cockell and Archie Moore.

Known for his relentless fighting style, formidable punching power, stamina, and exceptionally durable chin, Marciano is considered one of the greatest heavyweight boxers of all time. Marciano remains the only fighter to have stopped every opponent he ever faced for the world heavyweight title, and holds the highest knockout-to-win percentage in world heavyweight title fights at 85.71%. His career knockout-to-win percentage of 87.8% remains one of the highest in heavyweight boxing history. Marciano is ranked #14 in The Ring magazine's list of the 100 greatest punchers of all time.

== Early life ==
Born Rocco Francis Marchegiano on September 1, 1923, Rocky was raised on the south side of Brockton, Massachusetts. His parents, Pierino Marchegiano and Pasqualina Picciuto, were both immigrants from Italy. His father was from Ripa Teatina, Abruzzo, while his mother was from San Bartolomeo in Galdo, Campania. Marciano had two brothers, Louis (aka Sonny) and Peter, and three sisters, Alice, Concetta, and Elizabeth. When he was about 18 months old, Marciano contracted pneumonia, from which he almost died.

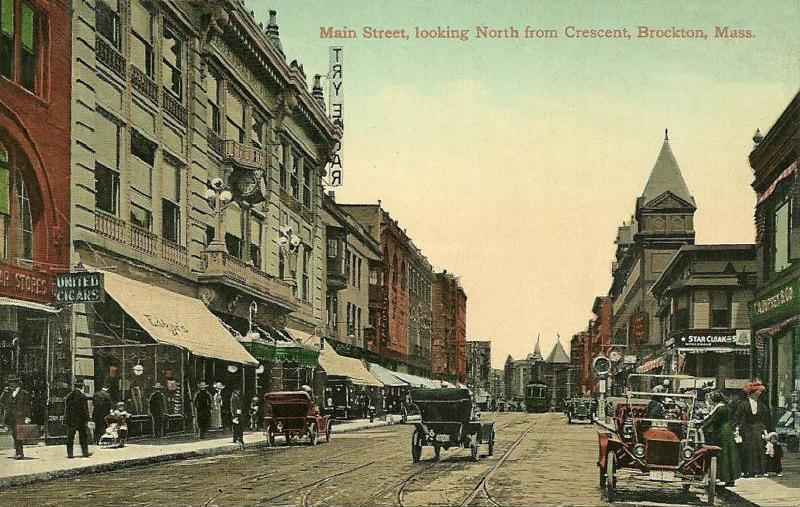
The Main Street of Brockton, Massachusetts, Rocky's hometown

In his youth, he worked out on homemade weightlifting equipment (later in his life, Marciano was also a client of Charles Atlas) and used a stuffed mailbag that hung from a tree in his back yard as a heavy bag. At Brockton High School, he participated on both the football and baseball teams, but he was removed from the baseball squad after joining a church league, which violated a policy against playing for outside teams. He dropped out after the 10th grade to help support his struggling family during the Great Depression. Among his various early jobs, he worked as a ditch digger, gardener, and leather tanner at the same shoe factory where his father was employed. He also worked as a "chute man" on delivery trucks for the Brockton Ice & Coal Company (for which he earned $10 per week).

During the Second World War, Marciano enlisted in the US Army in March 1943 and was assigned to the 150th Combat Engineers, serving for three years. Stationed in Swansea, Wales, he helped ferry supplies across the English Channel to Normandy. In August 1945, his battalion received a Presidential Unit Citation for outstanding performance of duty against the enemy from February 7–13, 1945, on the Sauer and Our Rivers in Luxembourg and Germany. After the war ended, he completed his service in March 1946 at Fort Lewis, Washington, where he received an honorable discharge from the Army with the rank of Private First Class.

== Amateur career ==
Marciano was introduced to boxing by an uncle, and fought during his stint in the Army during World War II, mostly because he wanted to avoid KP and other lousy details. He didn't think he would make boxing his career. But after his discharge from the Army in 1946, he began training.

On March 17, 1947, at the Valley Arena Gardens in Holyoke, Massachusetts, fighting under the assumed name Rocky Mack to protect his amateur status, he had his first fight as a pro, registering a third-round knockout and receiving $35. That spring, Marciano's dream of becoming a major league catcher finally ended when he failed in his tryout with a Chicago Cubs' minor league affiliate in Fayetteville, North Carolina.

Returning to boxing, Marciano began to make a name for himself on the amateur circuit, winning the Golden Gloves Tournament in Lowell, Massachusetts and the New England Golden Gloves, which earned him a spot in the Golden Gloves All-East Championship Tournament in March 1948. He was controversially beaten by Coley Wallace. Marciano rebounded by capturing the New England AAU heavyweight title in late March 1948, defeating George McInnis before 4,749 fans at the Boston Arena. After the tournament, doctors discovered that his left thumb was broken. The injury robbed him a shot at capturing the National AAU title in April, which carried with it an automatic berth on the U.S. Olympic team to compete in London that summer. Marciano's amateur record was 8–4.

== Professional career ==
Given his physical dimensions, Marciano did not fit the mold of a typical heavyweight boxer. He stood just over 5-foot-10 and generally weighed in the mid-180-pound range. With a reach measuring only 68 inches, he was considerably shorter in wingspan than most heavyweight champions. Yet Marciano turned what appeared to be disadvantages into strengths. Guided by his trainer, Charley Goldman, he developed a crouching style that made him appear even more compact and a far more elusive target. From that low stance, his jab rose sharply upward and carried notable power. Marciano once remarked that his approach worked to his benefit because many opponents "ended up punching down at me," which reduced the force of their blows. By contrast, punches thrown upward tend to generate greater impact. It may help explain why the only two fighters to drop Marciano—Walcott and Moore—were roughly comparable to him in size. Marciano himself noted that their similar stature neutralized the edge he typically enjoyed in the ring. "Charley taught the technique that if you are short, you make yourself smaller," Angelo Dundee said. "Charley let him bend his knees to a deep knee squat. He was able to punch from that position, come straight up from the bag and hit a heck of a shot...It was just bang-bang-bang-bang-BANG and get him outta there."

Marciano returned to the professional ranks on July 12, 1948, and quickly made an impact. He won each of his first 16 professional fights by knockout—all of them ending before the fifth round, with nine concluding in the opening round alone. Early in his career, Marciano adopted a new surname at the urging of his manager, Al Weill, after a ring announcer in Providence, Rhode Island, struggled to pronounce Marchegiano. By the middle of 1949, he began facing stronger competition. On May 23, 1949, Don Mogard became the first opponent to last the full distance against Marciano, though Marciano secured a unanimous decision victory. He went on defeating every subsequent challenger—most by knockout—earning the moniker "The Rock from Brockton."

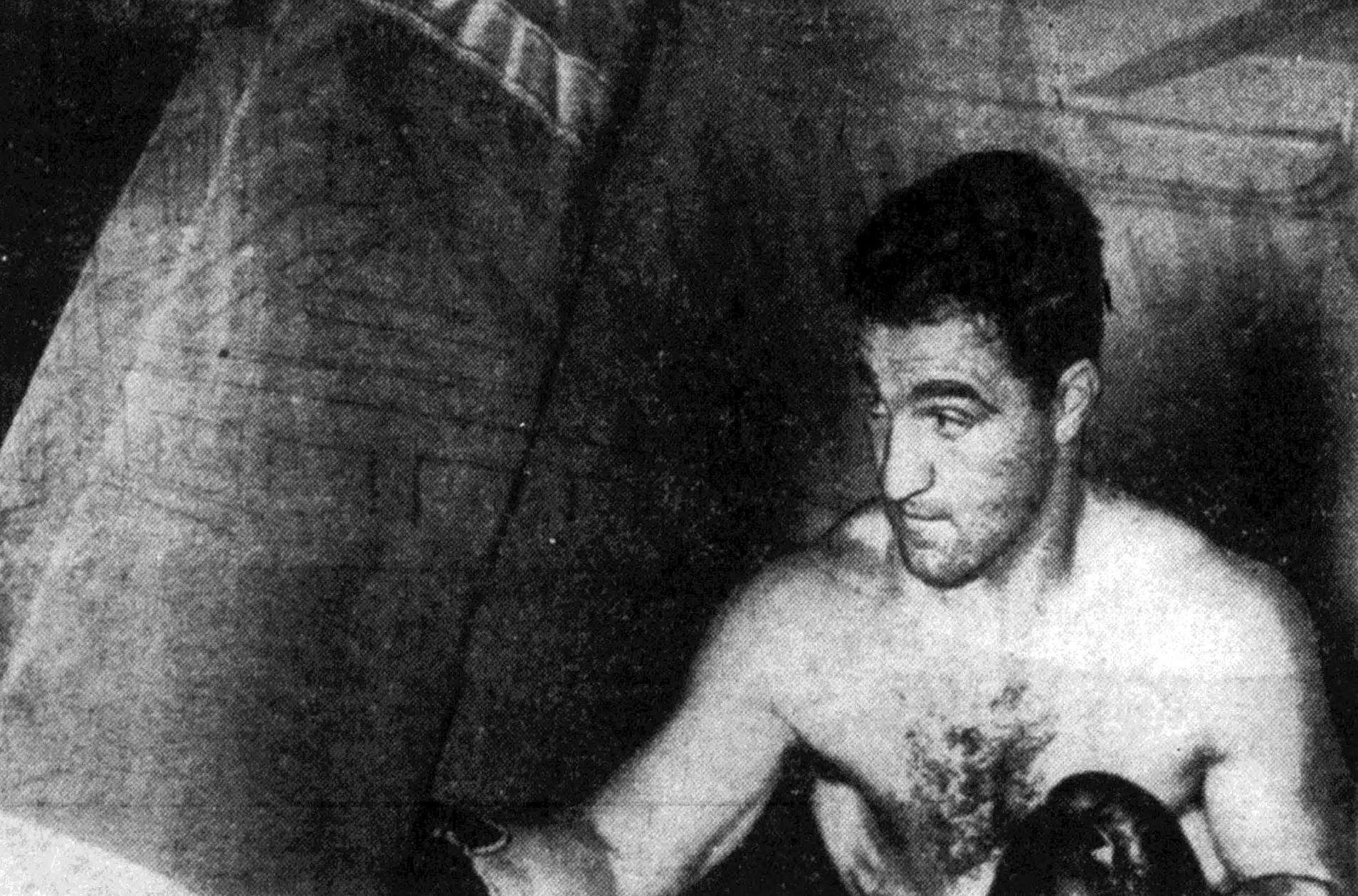
Marciano's professional training routine was notable for being extremely strict and physically exhausting

Marciano's punching power was vividly demonstrated on December 30, 1949, at Madison Square Garden, where he met Carmine Vingo. Entering the bout on a 12-fight unbeaten streak, Vingo was quickly overwhelmed. Marciano floored him twice for nine-counts—first in the opening round and again in the second. The punishing match concluded in the sixth round when Marciano delivered a devastating right hand that rendered Vingo unconscious. Vingo was taken immediately to a hospital and underwent surgery to treat a brain hemorrhage. He was administered the last rites by a priest. Deeply shaken by the incident, Marciano reportedly vowed he would retire from boxing if Vingo did not survive. Although Vingo recovered, he was left partially paralyzed. In the aftermath, Marciano offered financial assistance for some of Vingo's medical expenses, and the two men eventually formed a friendship.

On March 24, 1950, Marciano squared off against what was widely considered his most formidable opponent to that point, Roland La Starza. Both men entered the ring undefeated, and La Starza pushed Marciano in a contest that nearly stalled his ascent in the heavyweight ranks. The bout lasted the full 10 rounds and ended in a split decision in Marciano's favor, though a significant portion of the crowd felt La Starza had done enough to earn the victory. After several more matchups, he knocked out Rex Layne in his first television bout on July 12, 1951. In front of 12,565 at Madison Square Garden, Marciano bloodied Layne's nose and mouth, opened a cut above his left eye, knocked out two teeth and smashed his bridgework. In the sixth round, Marciano hit Layne on the chin with an overhand right. After a delayed reaction, Layne fell to the canvas face forward in a hunched position. Once he hit the canvas, he rolled over to his left side and was counted out.

In one of the most memorable bouts of his career, Marciano faced his childhood hero, former heavyweight champion Joe Louis, who was well beyond his peak years. Louis had returned from retirement in an effort to settle financial obligations and remained a dangerous, determined contender hoping to regain the heavyweight title. Marciano was a 6½-to-5 underdog. The two fought for eight rounds on October 26, 1951, at Madison Square Garden, before Marciano knocked Louis out with a powerful right to the jaw—an outcome that disappointed many boxing fans. Marciano himself was deeply affected by the result; after the fight, he reportedly went to Louis' dressing room and wept. Louis never entered the ring again, and the nationally televised matchup secured Marciano an opportunity to compete for the heavyweight title.

=== Heavyweight championship fights ===
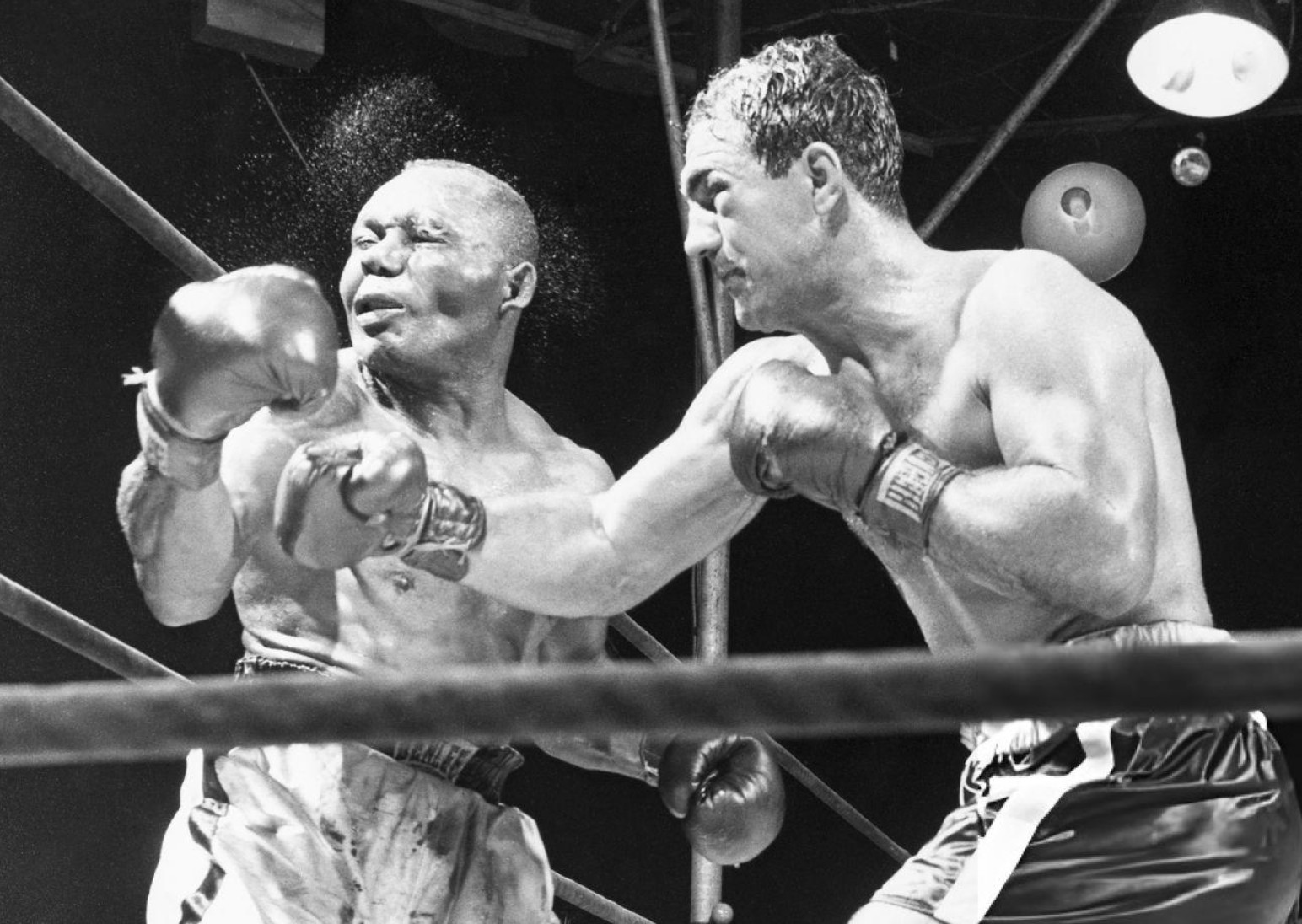
Marciano landing a right hook in the 13th round to knockout Walcott and win the world heavyweight title, 1952

On September 23, 1952, at Municipal Stadium in Philadelphia, Marciano challenged champion Jersey Joe Walcott for his first opportunity at the heavyweight title. The bout turned into a punishing ordeal. In the opening round, Marciano was knocked down for the first time in his professional career by one of Walcott's left hooks. Rather than remain on the canvas, he sprang to his feet, visibly angered, and shouted at a startled Walcott. Even so, Marciano struggled to seize control as the fight wore on. Walcott opened cuts between his eyes and across his forehead, and round after round slipped away from the challenger. By the conclusion of the 12th, Walcott appeared firmly ahead on the scorecards. Marciano later admitted that for several rounds he had been fighting with impaired vision.

Entering the 13th round, Marciano knew a knockout was his only path to victory. Just half a minute into the round, he fired a compact overhand right that crashed into Walcott's chin with tremendous force. Walcott dropped to one knee, draped his left arm over the middle rope, and slumped forward onto the canvas. He was counted out, and Marciano emerged as the new heavyweight champion. Marciano became the first heavyweight champion from Massachusetts since John L. Sullivan 62 years earlier.

Marciano met Walcott again in a rematch on May 15, 1953, at Chicago Stadium, and this time the outcome was swift. He stopped Walcott with a knockout just 2 minutes and 25 seconds into the opening round. Walcott threw a jab and Marciano countered with a left hook and a right uppercut that sent the off-balance Walcott sprawling on his back, his feet flying high above him. The challenger pulled himself up to a sitting position, one hand on the ropes, and appeared unhurt. He then sat there and let the referee count him out. Once the fatal ten was reached, Walcott hoisted himself to his feet and complained that he had received a fast count.

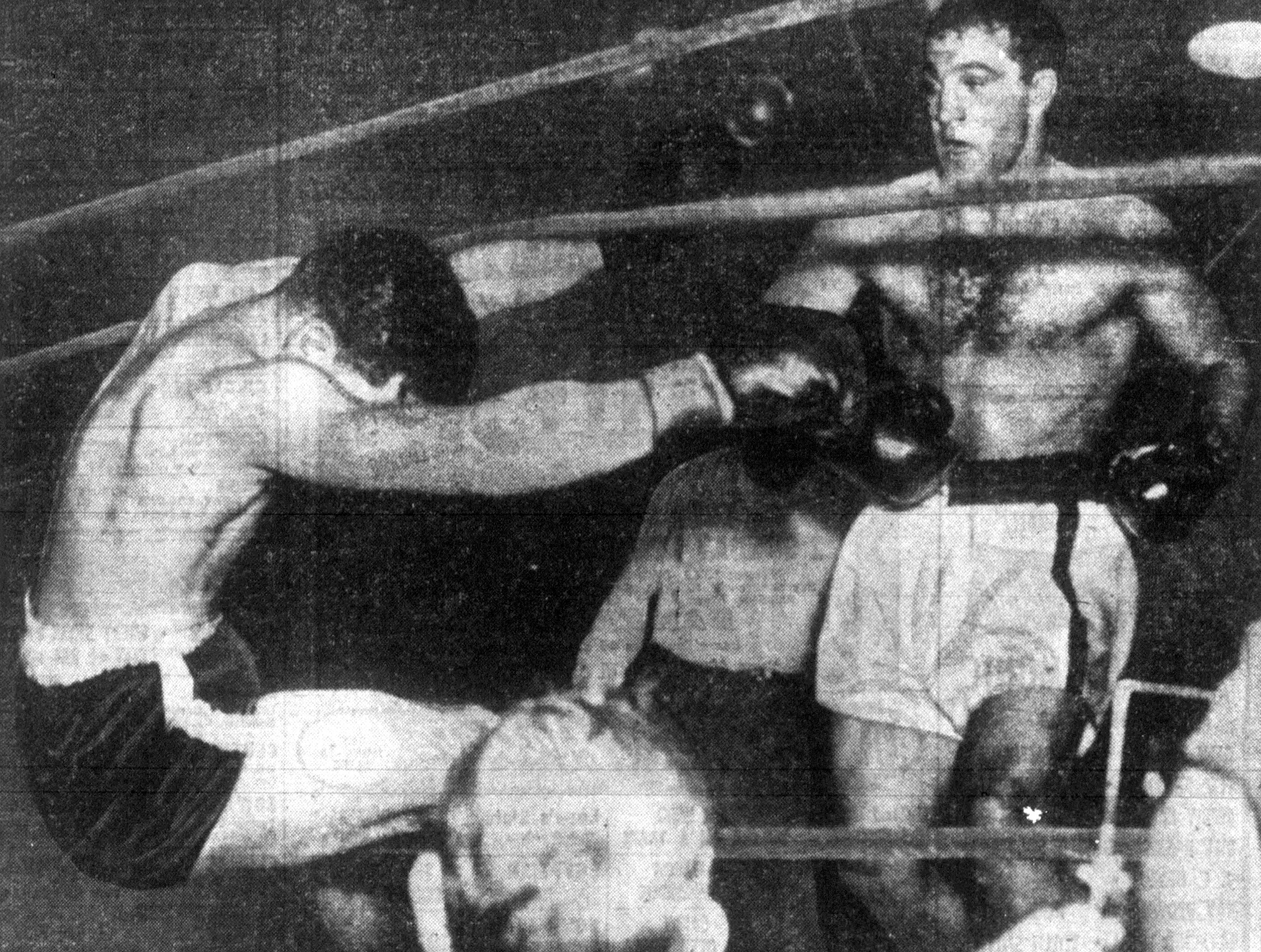
Marciano sends La Starza through the ropes during their 1953 title fight

His next defense was held on September 24, 1953, at New York's Polo Grounds, in what would be a rematch with his old rival, Roland La Starza. The bout remained competitive through the first six rounds, but La Starza began to fade as the fight progressed. By the 11th round, referee Ruby Goldstein halted the contest after La Starza had been relentlessly battered and knocked through the ropes. He was taken to the hospital with a broken arm, multiple blood clots, and required surgery.

Marciano faced stiffer challenges during his third and fourth title defenses against Ezzard Charles ("the Cincinnati Cobra") in 1954. In their first encounter, on June 17 at Yankee Stadium in New York City, Marciano fell behind on points early, but his right hand ultimately proved more damaging than Charles' left, allowing him to retain the championship by unanimous decision. Referee Ruby Goldstein scored the bout 8–5–2 in rounds for the champion. Judge Artie Aidala scored it 9–5–1 for Marciano while judge Harold Barnes had it 8–6–1. This was the only one of Marciano's seven title bouts that went 15 rounds. The rematch, held three months later at the same venue, proved even more grueling. In the sixth round, Charles landed a left hook that split Marciano's left nostril, and in the seventh, he opened a cut above Marciano's left eye. With blood streaming from both injuries and the referee considering stopping the bout, Marciano launched a desperate and ferocious assault in the eighth round, flooring Charles twice, the second knockdown ending the fight by knockout. Marciano's next title defense came on May 16, 1955, against British heavyweight Don Cockell at Kezar Stadium in San Francisco. Marciano won by technical knockout (TKO) at 0:54 in the 9th round.

His final title fight took place on September 21, 1955, against light-heavyweight champion, Archie Moore. Attendance at Yankee Stadium was 61,574. Marciano was sent to the canvas in the second round but recovered, flooring Moore in both the sixth and eighth rounds before finishing him with a knockout in the ninth. "After a fight with Marciano, you felt like someone had been striking you all over with a blackjack, or throwing rocks at you," Moore later recalled.

Marciano announced his retirement on April 27, 1956, at the age of 32. He finished his career an undefeated champion, with a final record of 49–0, 43 of them ending in knockouts.

== Boxing style ==
Marciano was known for his punches, especially his right hand Susie Q punch, and lead hook, which both had knockout potential. He would load up his shots bending his knees, and by using exaggerated head movement and putting his entire body weight into every punch. He also used a "gazelle punch" for his hook, springing up from a deep crouch to add power and cover distance.

His footwork included a shuffle step. He would move his back foot to his front foot to cover distance and generate more power. He also used a full-on shift into a southpaw stance to chase opponents. Marciano also used a backwards leaning advance keeping his head back and to the side off of centerline. When setting up his overhand, Marciano would lean back while shuffling into an exchange, allowing him to advance while remaining defensively responsible. If an opponent threw a punch, he could lean back to reduce the impact. He would also use crab style blocks including a rear cross block and a lead reverse elbow block.

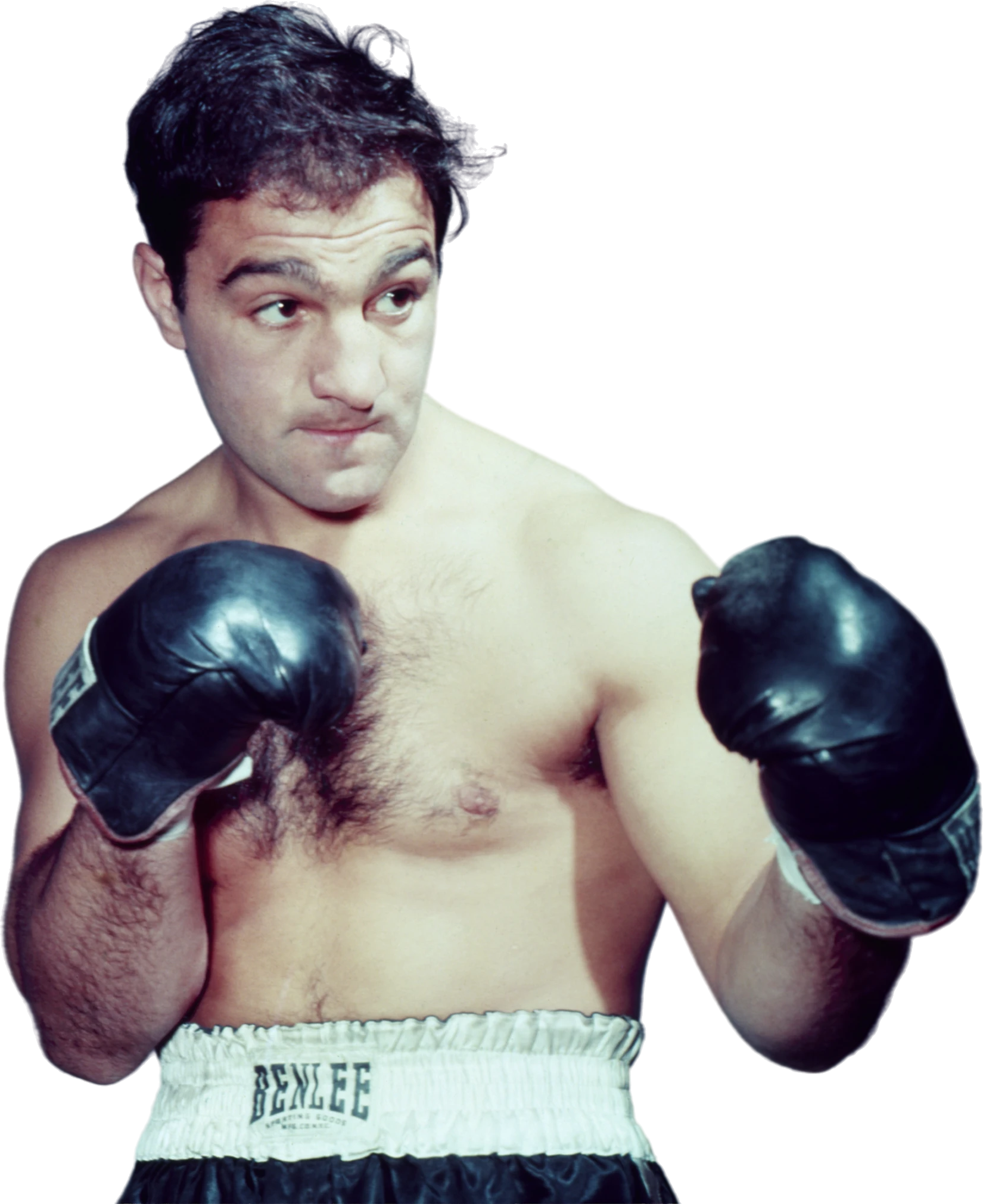
Marciano in 1955

At close range, he would drive his head into his opponent's hips or shoulders immediately after a punch to stay safe or after weaving to unbalance his competitors. He also used his head to manipulate his opponent's movement. When in close, he would use his shorter frame to unleash a barrage of short, tight punches.

With a relatively short reach of 68 inches and limited hand speed, Marciano was not known for relying on his jab. He used it sparingly, as it was not a key part of his strategy or a frequent setup for his powerful right hand. Instead, Marciano had other ways of landing his signature punches. One tactic he often used was timing his opponent's jab and responding with a right hook, aimed either at the body or the head. Upon developing his left hook, Marciano was able to use the punch to set up his right hand as well.

His trademark approach was a relentless forward pressure crowding opponents, cutting off the ring, and forcing exchanges. Marciano was renowned for his granite chin, relentless stamina, and tireless work ethic, maintaining a punishing pace that often broke opponents down both physically and mentally. Marciano was also known as an extremely resilient and determined boxer.

Marciano's aggression was limited to the ring; once the fight was over, he was quick to show respect to his opponents being known as one of the nicest people in the sport of boxing. His style was built to entertain, characterized by relentless pressure, constant exchanges, and a refusal to back down as he kept pressing forward.

== Training routine ==
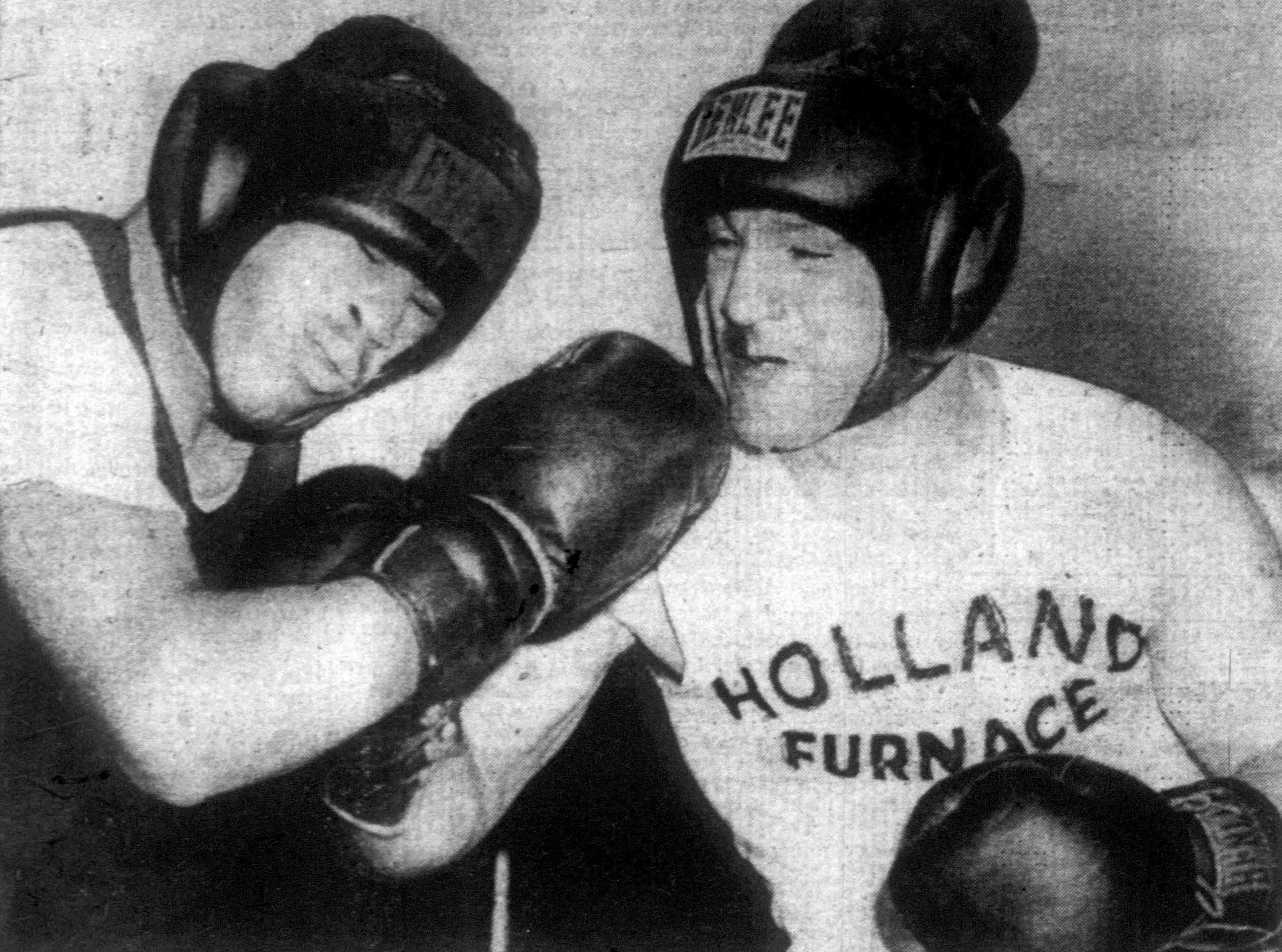
Marciano sparring with Tommy Harrison in 1953

Marciano was known for his intense training routine which included tons of cardio work. With Marciano running at least 5 miles per day, often uphill, and included running back downhill backwards. His regular gym routine included the basics such as hundreds of hours of sparring, heavy‐bag and speed‐bag work, along with tons of push-ups and sit-ups, and many medicine-ball "thumps to the gut" for core conditioning. It has also been reported that he would go to his local YMCA during fight camps, where he would shadowbox underwater for hours to build up his power. During his camp Marciano would follow a strict diet that was set by his trainer Alie Colombo, he also refrained from night life and went to bed at 9:30pm every night. Marciano's brother Peter later commented on his training stating "Rocky lived like a monk. He was always in incredible condition. He was devoted to training, and he could always throw more punches than he faced. He's never been given full credit for his conditioning."

== Life after boxing ==
In 1957 Marciano released a book titled Rocky Marcianos Book Of Boxing And Bodybuilding which he co wrote alongside his trainer Charley Goodman. The book focused on detailed exercises and boxing moves with drawings and photos of Marciano.

Marciano considered a comeback in 1959 when Ingemar Johansson won the Heavyweight Championship from Floyd Patterson on June 26, 1959. After only a month of training in nearly four years, Marciano decided against it and never seriously considered a comeback again.

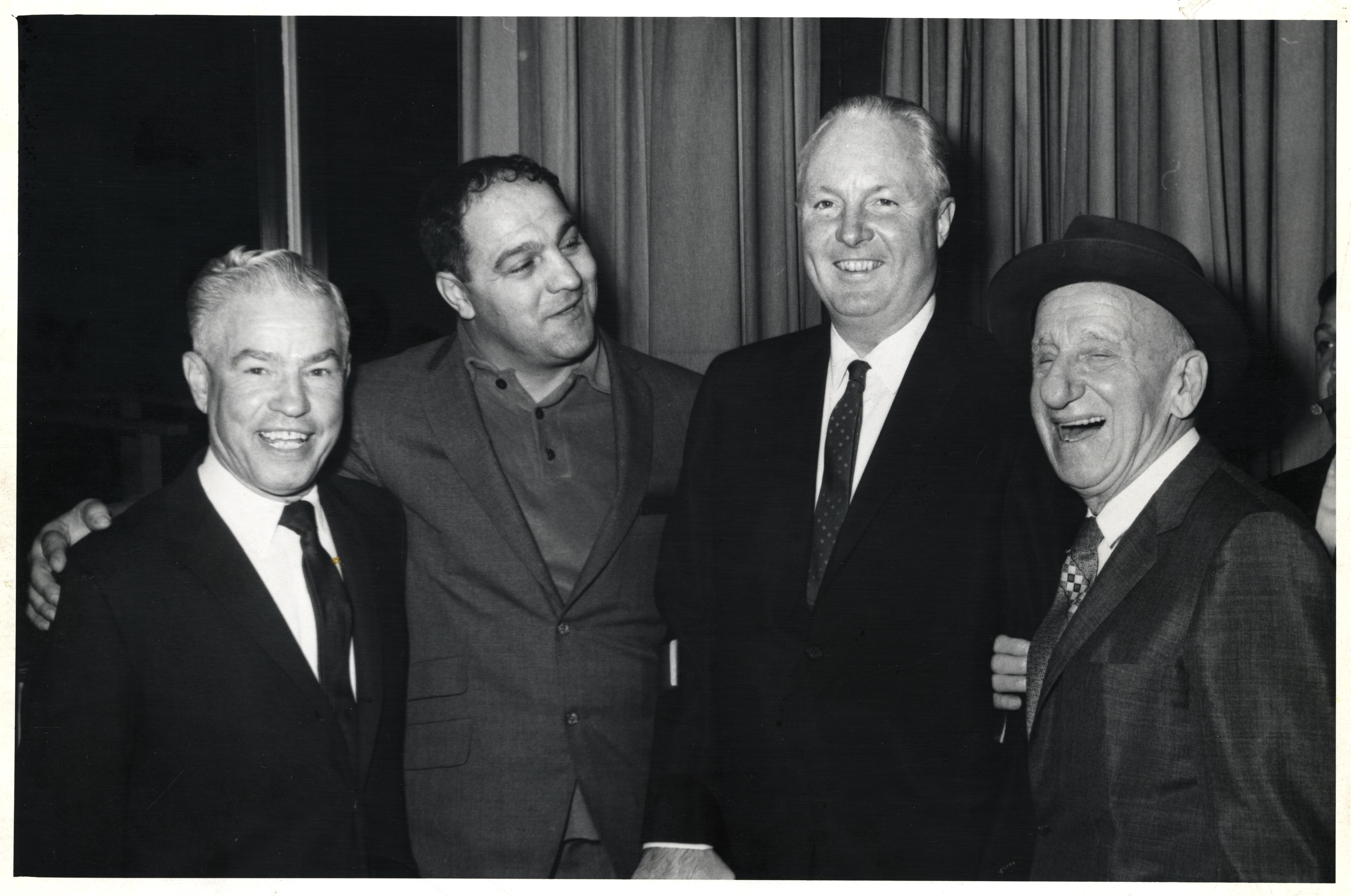
Marciano with Boston Mayor John F. Collins (center-right) and singer Jimmy Durante (right), 1968

After his retirement, Marciano entered the world of television and film, he made his acting debut, playing a small role in the 1957 film The Delicate Delinquent. 3 years later he appeared on the big screen once again as he played the deputy sheriff in College Confidentiall. In 1961 he began hosting a weekly boxing show on TV titled Main Event and later appearing in the Combat! episode "Masquerade" in 1963. Due to his celebrity status Marciano also made numerous appearances on late night talk shows and games show such as The Ed Sullivan ShowThe Merv Griffin Show,The Tonight Show Starting Johnny Carson along with making other minor acting appearances. For a brief period, he worked as a troubleshooting referee in wrestling (Marciano was a good wrestler in high school). He continued as a referee and boxing commentator in boxing matches for many years. He was also active in business as a partner and vice president of Papa Luigi Spaghetti Dens, a San Francisco-based franchise company formed by Joe Kearns and James Braly.

Marciano had two children—a daughter, Mary Anne (born 1952), who died on June 3, 2011, of complications from a respiratory illness and a son, Rocco Kevin (born 1968). Mary Anne had several run-ins with the law in Florida in the 1980s and 1990s, getting arrested and charged with assault and armed robbery after previously serving jail time for cocaine possession. Joey Marciano, a professional baseball player, is a cousin twice removed.

In late July 1969, shortly before his death, Marciano participated in the filming of The Superfight: Marciano vs. Ali. The two boxers were filmed sparring, then the film was edited to match a computer simulation of a hypothetical fight between them, each in his prime. It aired on January 20, 1970, with one version having Marciano winning and the second version having Ali winning.

== Personal life ==
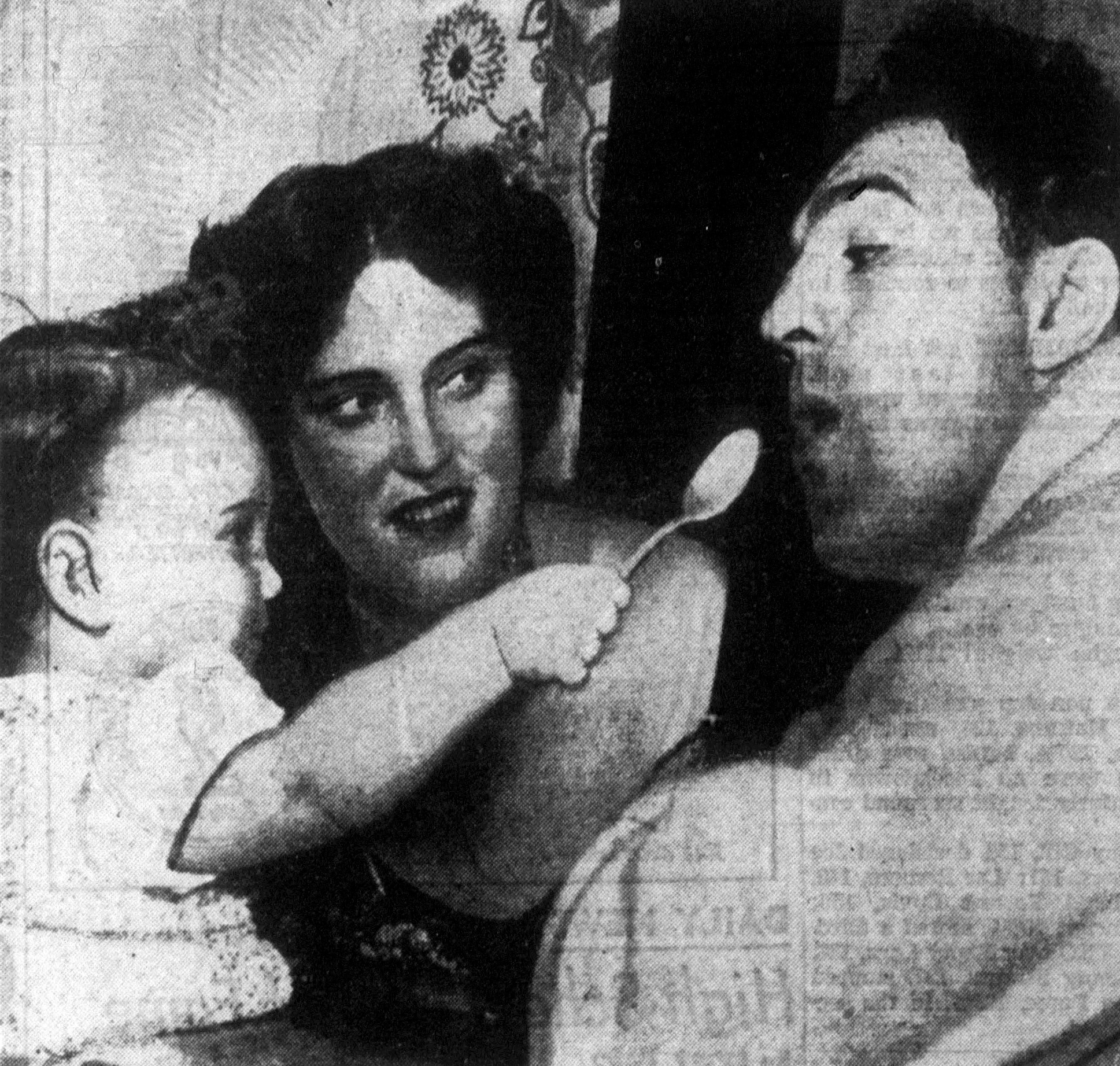
Marciano with his wife and daughter in 1954

In 1947, Marciano met Barbra Cousins, daughter of a Brockton police sergeant. The two were married on December 31, 1950. They had a daughter, Mary Ann, and later adopted a son, Rocco Junior.

Marciano was a devout Catholic and often attended mass during training and before a fight. He once stated "the biggest thrill I can think of would be an audience with the Pope".

Marciano ended up befriending his former opponent that he sent to the hospital, Carmine Vingo. Marciano ended up paying for his medical expenses and Vingo even attended Marciano's wedding. Marciano later stated "Carmine is my friend. He forgave me. If he hadn't, I wouldn't have been able to carry on." Marciano was also friends with many other prominent figures of his era including Frank Sinatra and Dean Martin.

== Death ==
On August 31, 1969 (the day before his 46th birthday), Marciano was a passenger in a small private plane, a Cessna 172 heading to Des Moines, Iowa, from Chicago Midway. It was night and bad weather had set in. The pilot, Glenn Belz, had only 231 total hours of flying time, 35 of them at night, and had no instrument rating. Belz tried to land the plane at a small airfield outside Newton, Iowa, but the aircraft hit a tree two miles short of the runway. Flying with Marciano in the back seat was Frankie Farrell, 28, the oldest son of organized crime figure Lew Farrell. Marciano, Belz, and Farrell were killed on impact. (Note: When rescuers reached the crashed aircraft, they saw Marciano's body still strapped in a seat. Upon hearing what had happened, people in boxing remembered what was said about Stanley Ketchel after Ketchel had been shot dead: "Start counting ten over him. He'll get up.")

The National Transportation Safety Board report said, "The pilot attempted an operation exceeding his experience and ability level, continued visual flight rules under adverse weather conditions and experienced spatial disorientation in the last moments of the flight." Marciano was on his way to give a speech to support his friend's son and there was a surprise birthday celebration waiting for him. He had hoped to return in the early morning for his 46th birthday celebration with his wife. He was coming from a dinner in Chicago at STP CEO Andy Granatelli's home.

Marciano is interred in a crypt at Forest Lawn Memorial Cemetery in Fort Lauderdale, Florida. His wife died five years later of lung cancer at age 46, and is entombed next to him.

== Legacy ==
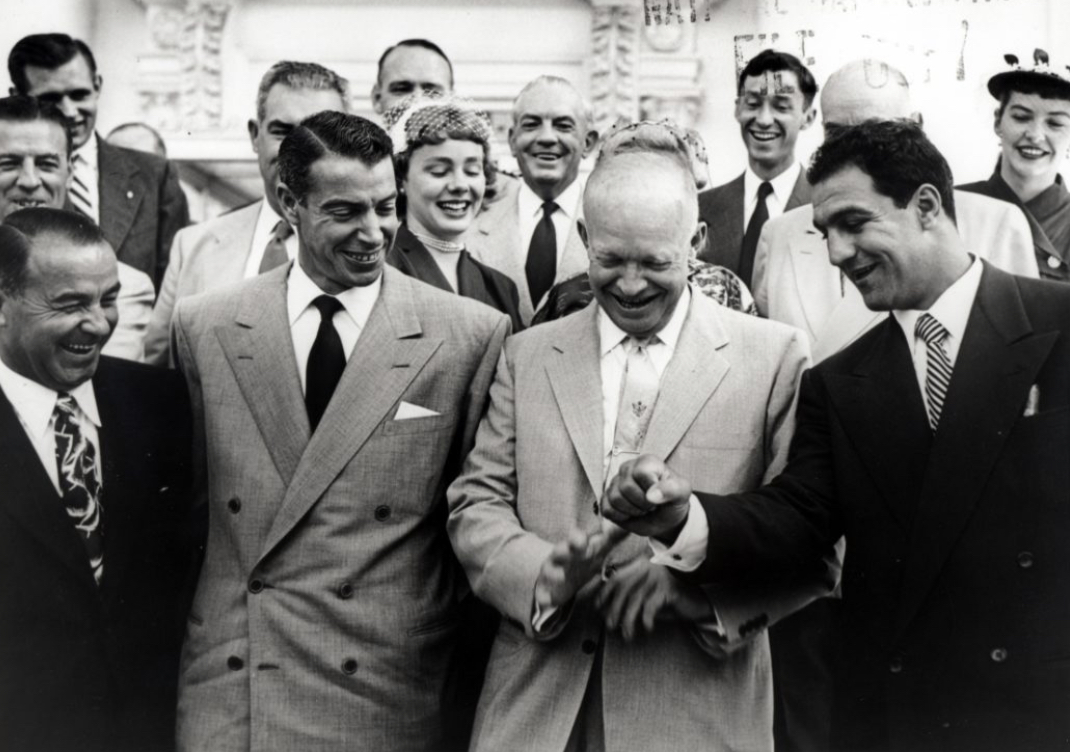
Marciano and Joe DiMaggio visiting President Dwight D. Eisenhower at the White House in 1953

Marciano holds the record with heavyweight Brian Nielsen for the longest undefeated streak by a heavyweight. He is also the only world heavyweight champion to go undefeated throughout his professional career. Although heavyweight champion Gene Tunney never suffered a defeat at heavyweight and retired as champion, he lost one career fight at light heavyweight, and his longest win streak was 32, with his overall record being 82-1-4(D)-1(NC). Marciano also has the highest knockout percentage of any heavyweight champion in history (over the period of a career) with 87.76%. In his professional career, he was only knocked down twice. The first occurred in his first title fight against Jersey Joe Walcott, and the second occurred against Archie Moore.

Despite his perfect record and retiring as champion, Marciano has sometimes been criticized for the allegedly low quality of opposition he faced during his career. At the time of his first fight with Roland La Starza, some experts believed it was La Starza and not Marciano who deserved the decision.

These criticisms notwithstanding, over the decades Marciano has been ranked highly in several all-time boxing lists. In December 1962, a Ring poll of 40 boxing experts placed Marciano as the seventh-best heavyweight of all time. Boxing historian Charlie Rose rated Marciano as the eight-best heavyweight of all time in 1968, while John McCallum's survey of boxing historians and writers listed him as the ninth-best all-timer in the division. In 1971, Nat Fleischer, a boxing historian and founder of The Ring, named Marciano as the 10th all-time greatest heavyweight champion.

In 1998, The Ring named Marciano as the sixth greatest heavyweight champion ever. In 2002, The Ring placed him at number 12 on the list of the 80 Best Fighters of the Last 80 Years. In 2003, The Ring rated Marciano number 14 on the list of 100 greatest punchers of all time. In 2005, he was named the fifth greatest heavyweight of all time by the International Boxing Research Organization. In 2007, on ESPN.com's list of the 50 Greatest Boxers of All Time, Marciano was ranked number 14, and was the 5th highest ranked heavyweight, behind (in order) Muhammad Ali, Joe Louis, Jack Johnson, and Jack Dempsey. The Boston Globe ranked Marciano fifth in a list of Top 100 New England sports figures of the 20th century. In 1999, Sports Illustrated named him the greatest sports figure from Massachusetts.

Marciano's punch was tested and it was featured in the December 1963 issue of Boxing Illustrated: "Marciano's knockout blow packs more explosive energy than an armor-piercing bullet and represents as much energy as would be required to spot lift 1000 pounds one foot off the ground."

Marciano was named fighter of the year by The Ring three times. His three championship fights between 1952 and 1954 were named fights of the year by the magazine. Marciano won the BWAA Sugar Ray Robinson Award (then known as the Edward J. Neil Trophy) in 1952. In 2006, an ESPN poll voted Marciano's 1952 championship bout against Walcott as the greatest knockout ever. Marciano also received the Hickok Belt for top professional athlete of the year in 1952. Murray Goodman later recalled that Ray Hickok, founder of the award, also presented Rocky with a hundred miniature boxing gloves, which Rocky was selling a week later for $1 a pair. In 1955, he was voted the second most important American athlete of the year. Throughout his life Marciano remained a beloved hero among the Italian-American community. During the 1950s Marciano received the "Star of Solidarity" from an Italian ambassador. It was the first time the honor had been conferred on anyone outside the Italian government. He is viewed as the first true Italian sports celebrity.

Marciano has been inducted into multiple halls of fame, most notably the International Boxing Hall of Fame, World Boxing Hall of Fame and National Italian American Sports Hall of Fame. His first-ever heavyweight belt is on display at the Italian American Sports Hall of Fame, along with a bronze sculpture in his likeness. Marciano is one of only three people to have a sculpture at the Hall of Fame.

Since 2005 an annual Rocky Marciano festival has been held in Ripa Teatina where Marciano father was from.

In 1980, there was a monument erected in Marciano's honor in Springfield, Massachusetts.

A bronze statue of Marciano was planned for a 2009 completion date in his hometown of Brockton, Massachusetts, as a gift to the city by the World Boxing Council. The artist, Mario Rendon, head of the Instituto Universitario de las Bellas Artes in Colima, Mexico, was selected to sculpt the statue. After years of delays in the planning stages, the groundbreaking for the statue was held on April 1, 2012, on the grounds of Brockton High School. The statue was officially unveiled on September 23, 2012, which was the 60th anniversary of Marciano winning the world heavyweight title. A bronze statue of Marciano was also erected in Ripa Teatina, Italy, to celebrate the birthplace of Marciano's father. Brockton High School's football stadium is also named in Marciano's honor. The school's sports teams are nicknamed "the boxers" in honor of both Marciano and Marvin Hagler the two have also led the city to develop the nickname "The City of Champions".

In 2019 the city of Newton, Iowa unveiled an informational sign and ceremonial rock honoring Marciano. Iowa Gov. Kim Reynolds also produced a proclamation declaring Aug. 30, 2019, as Rocky Marciano Remembrance Day.

In 2023, an event titled "Marciano At 100: A Celebration of Rocky Marciano's 100th Birthday" was held at the Des Plaines Theatre in Illinois. The event, hosted by the National Italian American Sports Hall of Fame, included a screening of the 1979 film Marciano and featured Marciano's 1952 championship belt on display. There were also other celebrations held in his home state of Massachusetts with Springfield declaring September 1 "Rocky Marciano Day".

In September 2025, Marciano's childhood home in Brockton was added to the National Register of Historic Places. His brother, sister and additional family members were on hand for the dedication ceremony held on September 20, 2025. The home now offers a tour featuring memorabilia from his career.

=== In popular culture ===
Marciano has had two films made on his remarkable rise to the top of the boxing world. The first one titled Marciano came out in 1979 where he was portrayed by Tony Lo Bianco. In 1999, the film titled Rocky Marciano came out where he is portrayed by Jon Favreau.

Marciano's fighting style and name inspired the Rocky Balboa character from the Rocky franchise.

=== Video games ===
Marciano appears as a playable character in the following video games.

Year	Title
1983	Ringside Seat
1993	Greatest Heavyweights
1998	Knockout Kings
2000	Knockout Kings 2001
2000	HBO Boxing
2003	Knockout Kings 2003
2004	Fight Night 2004
2005	Fight Night Round 2
2008	Don King Presents: Prizefighter
2009	Don King Boxing
2011	Fight Night Champion
2023	Undisputed

== Professional boxing record ==
49 fights	49 wins	0 losses
By knockout	43	0
By decision	6	0

No.	Result	Record	Opponent	Type	Round, time	Date	Location	Notes
49	Win	49–0	Archie Moore	KO	9 (15), 1:19	Sep 21, 1955	Yankee Stadium, New York City, New York, U.S.	Retained NYSAC, NBA, and The Ring heavyweight titles
48	Win	48–0	Don Cockell	TKO	9 (15), 0:54	May 16, 1955	Kezar Stadium, San Francisco, California, U.S.	Retained NYSAC, NBA, and The Ring heavyweight titles
47	Win	47–0	Ezzard Charles	KO	8 (15), 2:36	Sep 17, 1954	Yankee Stadium, New York City, New York, U.S.	Retained NYSAC, NBA, and The Ring heavyweight titles
46	Win	46–0	Ezzard Charles	UD	15	Jun 17, 1954	Yankee Stadium, New York City, New York, U.S.	Retained NYSAC, NBA, and The Ring heavyweight titles
45	Win	45–0	Roland La Starza	TKO	11 (15)	Sep 24, 1953	Polo Grounds, New York City, New York, U.S.	Retained NYSAC, NBA, and The Ring heavyweight titles
44	Win	44–0	Jersey Joe Walcott	KO	1 (15), 2:25	May 15, 1953	Chicago Stadium, Chicago, Illinois, U.S.	Retained NYSAC, NBA, and The Ring heavyweight titles
43	Win	43–0	Jersey Joe Walcott	KO	13 (15), 0:43	Sep 23, 1952	Municipal Stadium, Philadelphia, Pennsylvania, U.S.	Won NYSAC, NBA, and The Ring heavyweight titles
42	Win	42–0	Harry Matthews	KO	2 (10), 2:04	Jul 28, 1952	Yankee Stadium, New York City, New York, U.S.	
41	Win	41–0	Bernie Reynolds	KO	3 (10), 2:21	May 12, 1952	Auditorium, Providence, Rhode Island, U.S.	
40	Win	40–0	Gino Buonvino	KO	2 (10), 1:35	Apr 21, 1952	Auditorium, Providence, Rhode Island, U.S.	
39	Win	39–0	Lee Savold	RTD	6 (10), 3:00	Feb 13, 1952	Convention Hall, Philadelphia, Pennsylvania, U.S.	
38	Win	38–0	Joe Louis	TKO	8 (10)	Oct 26, 1951	Madison Square Garden, New York City, New York, U.S.	
37	Win	37–0	Freddie Beshore	KO	4 (10), 0:50	Aug 27, 1951	Boston Garden, Boston, Massachusetts, U.S.	
36	Win	36–0	Rex Layne	KO	6 (10), 0:35	Jul 12, 1951	Madison Square Garden, New York City, New York, U.S.	
35	Win	35–0	Willis Applegate	UD	10	Apr 30, 1951	Auditorium, Providence, Rhode Island, U.S.	
34	Win	34–0	Art Henri	TKO	9 (10), 2:51	Mar 26, 1951	Auditorium, Providence, Rhode Island, U.S.	
33	Win	33–0	Harold Mitchell	TKO	2 (10), 2:45	Mar 20, 1951	Auditorium, Hartford, Connecticut, U.S.	
32	Win	32–0	Keene Simmons	TKO	8 (10), 2:54	Jan 29, 1951	Auditorium, Providence, Rhode Island, U.S.	
31	Win	31–0	Bill Wilson	TKO	1 (10), 1:50	Dec 18, 1950	Auditorium, Providence, Rhode Island, U.S.	
30	Win	30–0	Ted Lowry	UD	10	Nov 13, 1950	Auditorium, Providence, Rhode Island, U.S.	
29	Win	29–0	Johnny Shkor	TKO	6 (10), 1:28	Sep 18, 1950	Auditorium, Providence, Rhode Island, U.S.	
28	Win	28–0	Gino Buonvino	TKO	10 (10), 0:25	Jul 10, 1950	Braves Field, Boston, Massachusetts, U.S.	
27	Win	27–0	Eldridge Eatman	TKO	3 (10)	Jun 5, 1950	Auditorium, Providence, Rhode Island, U.S.	
26	Win	26–0	Roland La Starza	SD	10	Mar 24, 1950	Madison Square Garden, New York City, New York, U.S.	
25	Win	25–0	Carmine Vingo	KO	6 (10), 1:46	Dec 30, 1949	Madison Square Garden, New York City, New York, U.S.	
24	Win	24–0	Phil Muscato	TKO	5 (10), 1:15	Dec 19, 1949	Auditorium, Providence, Rhode Island, U.S.	
23	Win	23–0	Pat Richards	TKO	2 (8), 0:39	Dec 2, 1949	Madison Square Garden, New York City, New York, U.S.	
22	Win	22–0	Joe Dominic	KO	2 (10), 2:26	Nov 7, 1949	Auditorium, Providence, Rhode Island, U.S.	
21	Win	21–0	Ted Lowry	UD	10	Oct 10, 1949	Auditorium, Providence, Rhode Island, U.S.	
20	Win	20–0	Tommy DiGiorgio	KO	4 (10), 2:04	Sep 26, 1949	Auditorium, Providence, Rhode Island, U.S.	
19	Win	19–0	Pete Louthis	KO	3 (10)	Aug 16, 1949	New Page Arena, New Bedford, Massachusetts, U.S.	
18	Win	18–0	Harry Haft	KO	3 (10), 2:21	Jul 18, 1949	Auditorium, Providence, Rhode Island, U.S.	
17	Win	17–0	Don Mogard	UD	10	May 23, 1949	Auditorium, Providence, Rhode Island, U.S.	
16	Win	16–0	Jimmy Evans	TKO	3 (10)	May 2, 1949	Auditorium, Providence, Rhode Island, U.S.	
15	Win	15–0	Jimmy Walls	KO	3 (10), 2:44	Apr 11, 1949	Auditorium, Providence, Rhode Island, U.S.	
14	Win	14–0	Artie Donato	KO	1 (10), 0:33	Mar 28, 1949	Auditorium, Providence, Rhode Island, U.S.	
13	Win	13–0	Johnny Pretzie	TKO	5 (10), 1:46	Mar 21, 1949	Auditorium, Providence, Rhode Island, U.S.	
12	Win	12–0	Gilley Ferron	TKO	2 (6), 2:21	Dec 14, 1948	Convention Hall, Philadelphia, Pennsylvania, U.S.	
11	Win	11–0	James Patrick Connolly	TKO	1 (8), 1:57	Nov 29, 1948	Auditorium, Providence, Rhode Island, U.S.	
10	Win	10–0	Bob Jefferson	TKO	2 (6), 2:30	Oct 4, 1948	Auditorium, Providence, Rhode Island, U.S.	
9	Win	9–0	Gilbert Cardone	KO	1 (4), 0:36	Sep 30, 1948	Uline Arena, Washington, D.C., U.S.	
8	Win	8–0	Bill Hardeman	KO	1 (6)	Sep 20, 1948	Auditorium, Providence, Rhode Island, U.S.	
7	Win	7–0	Humphrey Jackson	KO	1 (6), 1:08	Sep 13, 1948	Auditorium, Providence, Rhode Island, U.S.	
6	Win	6–0	Jimmy Weeks	TKO	1 (6), 2:50	Aug 30, 1948	Auditorium, Providence, Rhode Island, U.S.	
5	Win	5–0	Eddie Ross	KO	1 (6), 1:03	Aug 23, 1948	Auditorium, Providence, Rhode Island, U.S.	
4	Win	4–0	Bobby Quinn	KO	3 (4), 0:22	Aug 9, 1948	Auditorium, Providence, Rhode Island, U.S.	
3	Win	3–0	John Edwards	KO	1 (4), 1:19	Jul 19, 1948	Auditorium, Providence, Rhode Island, U.S.	
2	Win	2–0	Harry Bilazarian	TKO	1 (4)	Jul 12, 1948	Auditorium, Providence, Rhode Island, U.S.	
1	Win	1–0	Lee Epperson	KO	3 (4), 0:42	Mar 17, 1947	Valley Arena Gardens, Holyoke, Massachusetts, U.S.	

== Titles in boxing ==
=== Major world titles ===
- NYSAC heavyweight champion (200+ lbs)
- NBA (WBA) heavyweight champion (200+ lbs)

=== The Ring magazine titles ===
- The Ring heavyweight champion (200+ lbs)

=== Undisputed titles ===
- Undisputed heavyweight champion

== Awards ==
- Awarded Packy McFarland Memorial Trophy by an association of Chicago boxing writers: 1951, 1954 (first two-time winner)
- Hickok Belt (Athlete of the Year): 1952
- Awarded Edward J. Neil Memorial Plaque by the Boxing Writers Association of New York: 1952
- The Ring magazine Fighter of the Year: 1952, 1954 and 1955
- The Ring magazine Fight of the Year: 1952 vs. Jersey Joe Walcott I, 1953 vs. Roland La Starza II, 1954 vs. Ezzard Charles II
- Awarded Graham McNamee Memorial Award in 1953 for outstanding contribution to the general welfare of sports.

=== Halls of fame ===
- Inaugural member of the International Boxing Hall of Fame in 1990
- Inaugural member of the World Boxing Hall of Fame in 1980
- Inducted into the Rhode Island Heritage Hall of Fame in 1976
- Member of the National Italian American Sports Hall of Fame

== Filmography ==
=== Film ===
Year	Film	Role	Note
1957	The Delicate Delinquent	Himself	Uncredited
1960	College Confidential	Deputy Sheriff	
1970	The Super Fight	Himself	

=== Television ===
Year	Show	Role	Note
1951–1955	The Ed Sullivan Show	Himself (guest)	4 episodes
1952	All Star Revue	Himself - Guest Actor	1 episode
1953–1954	The Colgate Comedy Hour	Himself - Boxer	2 episodes
1954-–1956	Person to Person	Himself - Boxer	2 episodes
1956	The Red Skeleton Hour	Himself (guest)	1 episode
1957	Captain David Grief	Mike Riley	1 episode: Idols of Rapa-Nui
1960	You Bet Your Life	Himself (guest)	2 episodes
1961	Main Event	Himself Host	Weekly television show
1963	The Keefe Brasselle Show	Himself (guest)	1 episode
1963	Combat!	Soldier Who Greets Red Cross Truck	Uncredited
1963–1965	The Tonight Show Starting Johnny Carson	Himself (guest)	2 episodes
1964	The Mike Douglas Show	Himself (guest)	1 episode
1965	ABC's Nightlife	Himself (guest)	1 episode
1967	The Merv Griffin Show	Himself (guest)	1 episode
1968	The Bob Hope Show	Himself (guest)	1 episode
1969	The Donald O'Connor Show	Himself (guest)	1 episode

== See also ==
- List of heavyweight boxing champions
- List of undisputed boxing champions
- List of The Ring world champions

== Bibliography ==
- Stanton, Mike (2018). Unbeaten: Rocky Marciano's Fight for Perfection in a Crooked World. Henry Holt & Co. ISBN 978-1627799195.
- Jarrett, John (2018). Rocky Marciano: The Brockton Blockbuster. Pitch Pub. ISBN 978-1785313813.
- Orlando, Giuliano (2014). Rocky Marciano"The King". Libreria dello Sport. ISBN 978-8861270510.
- Vespignani & Barbi, Giorgio & Moreno (2012). Riflessioni sul pugilato. Booksprint. ISBN 9788867426263.
- United States Congress (2008). UNITED STATES OF AMERICA CONGRESSIONAL RECORD VOLUME 154. U.S. Government Publishing Office. ISBN 9780160891816.
- Sullivan, Russell (2002). Rocky Marciano: The Rock of His Times. University of Illinois Press. ISBN 0252072626.
- Skehan, Everett M. (1977). Rocky Marciano: Biography of a First Son. Boston, Massachusetts: Houghton Mifflin. ISBN 0-395-25356-X.

Sporting positions
World boxing titles
Preceded by Jersey Joe Walcott	NYSAC heavyweight champion September 23, 1952 – April 27, 1956; Retired	Vacant Title next held by Floyd Patterson
Preceded by Jersey Joe Walcott	NBA heavyweight champion September 23, 1952 – April 27, 1956; Retired	Vacant Title next held by Floyd Patterson
Preceded by Jersey Joe Walcott	The Ring heavyweight champion September 23, 1952 – April 27, 1956; Retired	Vacant Title next held by Floyd Patterson
Preceded by Jersey Joe Walcott	Undisputed heavyweight champion September 23, 1952 – April 27, 1956; Retired	Vacant Title next held by Floyd Patterson
Records
Preceded by Max Baer; Age 50	Youngest world heavyweight champion to have died Age 45; August 31, 1969 – December 30, 1970	Succeeded by Sonny Liston c. age 38 to 40
