= Ringside Seat =

1983 video game

- Publisher: Strategic Simulations
- Platforms: Apple II, Commodore 64
- Release: 1983
- Genre: Sports

Ringside Seat is a 1983 video game published by Strategic Simulations.

== Gameplay ==
Ringside Seat is a strategic simulation game in which the player manages a boxer.

The game featured some real-life boxers, such as Sonny Liston and Rocky Marciano.

== Reception ==
Dave Long reviewed the game for Computer Gaming World, and stated that "Even dedicated non-gamers will change their tune when you show them this one, with heads snapping back and bodies crashing to the canvas. Tie on your gloves and come out fighting, folks, because this game is for real!!"

Rick Teverbaugh reviewed the game for Computer Gaming World, and stated that "Overall, the game has just as believable results as anyone, but getting there just isn't quite as much fun.."
