= Red Applegate =

American boxer

- Pitcher
- Born: November 4, 1922; Newark, New Jersey, U.S.
- Died: August 8, 1965 (aged 42)
- Batted: Unknown Threw: Unknown

Negro league baseball debut
- 1947, for the Newark Eagles

Last appearance
- 1947, for the Newark Eagles
- Stats at Baseball Reference

Teams
- Newark Eagles (1947)

Willis "Red" Applegate (November 4, 1921 – August 1, 1965) was a United States boxer and Negro league baseball player.

== Early life ==
In 1942 at the age of 20, Applegate served in the 92nd Infantry Division in the Mediterranean Theater of Operations during World War II. He was discharged in 1945.

== Boxing ==
His professional boxing career began in 1946 with 4 consecutive wins, 2 by knockout (both in the first round), but he was stopped by Austin Johnson. He won his next fight, and lost the next three. He fought several more fights afterwards. In April 1951, he fought legendary boxer Rocky Marciano for 10 rounds, only to lose by decision. Overall, he compiled a record of 11-16-2 (4 KO). His boxing career ended in 1951 after suffering a detached retina.

== Negro league baseball ==
In 1947, he briefly pitched for the Newark Eagles of the Negro National League.
