= Rocky Marciano vs. Ezzard Charles II =

Boxing match

- Date: September 17, 1954
- Venue: Yankee Stadium, New York City, New York, U.S.
- Title(s) on the line: NYSAC, NBA and The Ring undisputed heavyweight championship

Tale of the tape
Boxer	(United States) Rocky Marciano	(United States) Ezzard Charles
Nickname	"The Brockton Blockbuster"	"The Cincinnati Cobra"
Hometown	Brockton, Massachusetts	Cincinnati, Ohio
Pre-fight record	46–0 (40 KO)	85–11–1 (49 KO)
Age	31 years	33 years, 2 months
Height	5 ft 10 in (178 cm)	6 ft 0 in (183 cm)
Weight	187 lb (85 kg)	192 1/2 lb (87 kg)
Style	Orthodox	Orthodox
Recognition	NYSAC, NBA, and The Ring; Undisputed Heavyweight Champion	NBA; No. 1 Ranked Heavyweight; The Ring; No. 2 Ranked Heavyweight; Former undisputed heavyweight champion

Result
- Marciano won via 8th-round KO

Rocky Marciano vs. Ezzard Charles II was a professional boxing match contested on September 17, 1954, for the undisputed heavyweight championship. It was a rematch following the pair's first fight held just four months earlier.

One of the most well known heavyweight fights of the 1950's, the dramatic fight ended in the eighth round, when Marciano knocked out Charles.

== Background ==
The highly anticipated second Marciano–Charles bout proved to be surprisingly dramatic with both the fighters exerting dominance in different stages of the fight. Charles had put on weight for this fight, and his strategy seemed to be to go for a swift knockout.

Marciano was guaranteed 40% from the ticket sales revenue and Charles was guaranteed 20%, the same as in the first fight.

== The fight ==
=== Early rounds ===
Charles won the first round by landing some clean punches on Marciano's jaw. In the second round, Marciano hit Charles with a body blow, and then knocked Charles down on the canvas, but quickly beat the count. Marciano now went for the kill, but Charles proved too slippery and survived the round. The fight then became an offensive–defensive affair with Marciano constantly on the attack and Charles content to do defensive boxing while throwing only occasional punches. The fight became dull and insipid with about the only excitement coming from Marciano's usage of roughhouse tactics like throwing low blows and hitting after the bell. The fouls did not affect the judges who had Marciano well ahead after the fifth round.

=== A twist in the tale ===
Something strange happened in the sixth round because of which Ezzard Charles almost won the fight. As Charles and Marciano emerged from a clinch towards the end of the round, Marciano was seen sporting a deep wound on his left nostril. It was unclear how Marciano got hurt with some claiming it was due to Charles's punches, and Marciano laying the blame on Charles's elbow. Marciano now started bleeding profusely from the wound; he would later observe: "I knew something was wrong because the blood was running like from a faucet. "Meanwhile, Charles's corner was feeling triumphant after the sixth round; Charles was advised by them to keep throwing punches at Marciano's nose.

=== Seventh round ===
In the seventh round, Marciano went out with a makeshift patch over his nose; the device was quickly knocked off by Charles's punches as Charles went after Marciano's nose. Remarkably enough, Marciano won the seventh round by landing more blows than Charles who was left staggered at the end of the round. Even so, it was Marciano who was in danger because of the nose wound which continued to gush blood. The word was out that the fight would only be allowed to continue for one or two more rounds.

=== Eighth round ===
In the interval before the eighth round, Marciano's corner advised him to go after Charles's body. Instead, he decided to ignore the advice and went after his opponent's head. As Marciano later explained:

I was spilling too much blood, and they might have stopped it. I like my title too much to lose it on account of a little blood. I don't knock 'em out in the body. I knock 'em out on the chin.

With 24 seconds left for the end of the eighth round, Ezzard Charles was knocked out by Marciano.

== Aftermath ==
It was later suggested that the extra weight Charles had put on for this fight resulted in him providing a slower target for Marciano.

== Legacy ==
Many critics regard the two Marciano–Charles fights to be among the greatest heavyweight boxing bouts. Particular praise is given to the second Marciano–Charles fight, which is considered by critics to be among Marciano's finest performances in his boxing career and most memorable and entertaining fight. The rematch was also awarded The Ring magazine’s Fight of the Year of 1954.

== Undercard ==
Confirmed bouts:

Preceded by First bout	Rocky Marciano's bouts 17 September 1954	Succeeded by vs. Don Cockell
Preceded by First bout	Ezzard Charles's bouts 17 September 1954	Succeeded by vs. Charley Norkus
Awards
Previous: Rocky Marciano vs. Roland La Starza II	The Ring Fight of the Year; 1954	Succeeded by Carmen Basilio vs. Tony DeMarco II
