= Ted Lowry =

American boxer

Personal information
- Born: Ted Lowry; October 27, 1919 New Haven, Connecticut, U.S.
- Died: June 14, 2010 (aged 90)
- Height: 5 ft 10 in (178 cm)
- Weight: Heavyweight

Boxing career
- Stance: Orthodox

Boxing record
- Total fights: 143
- Wins: 70
- Win by KO: 46
- Losses: 68
- Draws: 10

"Tiger" Ted Lowry (October 27, 1919 – June 14, 2010) was an American boxer who fought from 1939 to 1955. Although considered a journeyman boxer, Lowry faced many contenders and future champions, and was a tough fighter who suffered only three losses by stoppage in over 140 fights.

== Boxing career ==
Ted Lowry's career started out strong, with 8 successful fights (7 wins, 1 draw), before losing to Sam Shumway, whom he had previously beaten, and would defeat again in their next fight. Afterwards, he fought regularly, winning some and losing some. He twice faced future heavyweight champion Rocky Marciano, going the distance on both occasions. In doing so he became one of only three fighters to avoid being knocked out by Marciano.

He retired from boxing in 1955. Overall, he compiled a record of 70 wins, 68 losses, and 10 draws, 46 wins by way of knockout.

Whilst serving in the armed forces, Lowry fought an exhibition against Heavyweight Champion Joe Louis.

== Honors ==
Lowry was a member of the all-black 555th Parachute Battalion and was honored by United States presidents for his World War II service.
