= Carmine Vingo =

American boxer (1929–2015)

Carmine Vingo (December 28, 1929 – June 2, 2015) was an Italian-American professional boxer (16-2), best remembered for his career-ending bout (sixth-round TKO) against heavyweight contender Rocky Marciano (24-0) in December 1949. It's one of the earliest bouts filmed during Marciano's undefeated career.

== Professional career ==
Nicknamed 'Bingo Vingo' for his willingness to take chances to win in the ring, Vingo started his career by winning 16 of his first 17 professional bouts, losing only a questionable decision to undefeated Brooklyn heavyweight prospect Joe Lindsay in White Plains, New York, in 1948. Vingo won 12 consecutive fights, including a unanimous decision over highly regarded 16–2 contender Joe Modzele on a boxing card at Yankee Stadium in August 1949. A second round knockout of Al Robinson at Sunnyside Garden Arena in Queens, New York, propelled Vingo into the world heavyweight rankings, and a crossroads bout with rising star Rocky Marciano.

=== Fight with Rocky Marciano ===
On December 30, 1949, at Madison Square Garden, Vingo, then 16–1, and Marciano, 24–0, fought a slugfest. Marciano put Vingo down in the first and second rounds. Vingo fought back well, and by the end of the fifth round, was hurting Marciano with right hand power shots, and seemed to be gaining momentum. Marciano would later describe his bout with Vingo as "The toughest fight of my career."

At 1:46 of round six, Vingo was knocked out by an uppercut. Unconscious, he was carried on a stretcher to a hospital two blocks away as no ambulance was available at the scene. Marciano paced the corridors of the hospital, praying for Vingo's life, in what became a public media event. Administered last rites by a priest, and given only a 50–50 chance of survival after slipping into a coma, Vingo underwent brain surgery, eventually recovering and returning home from the hospital two months later in February 1950. His left side was slightly paralyzed and his vision was affected in both eyes, ending his promising boxing career. Marciano waited for Vingo to recover before resuming his career.

== Life after boxing ==
Following the end of his boxing career, Vingo married his high school sweetheart and worked at an office building on Broadway in Manhattan as a 'security porter' (a combination of both positions) for many years.

=== Friendship with Rocky Marciano ===
After his health improved, Vingo visited Rocky Marciano's training camps, attended Rocky Marciano's wedding as an invited guest, and attended Rocky's second fight with Jersey Joe Walcott as Marciano's guest in May 1953. In September 1969, Vingo attended the funeral of Rocky Marciano in Florida at his own expense. In a 1971 interview, Vingo described Marciano as "One of the nicest guys you'd ever want to talk to."

== Death ==
Vingo died on June 2, 2015, at age 85 of natural causes in Bronx, New York.
