= Harry Matthews (boxer) =

American boxer (1922–2003)

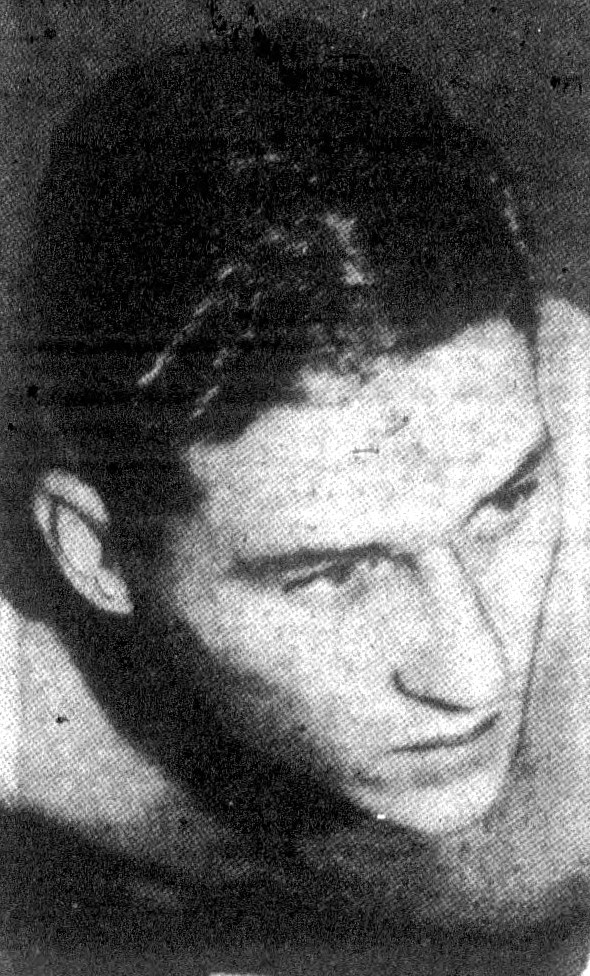
- Matthews, circa 1951

Personal information
- Nickname: Kid
- Nationality: American
- Born: December 9, 1922 Emmett, Idaho
- Died: February 21, 2003 (aged 80) Seattle, Washington
- Height: 5 ft 11 in (1.80 m)
- Weight: Middleweight Light-heavyweight Heavyweight

Boxing career
- Stance: Orthodox

Boxing record
- Total fights: 103
- Wins: 90
- Win by KO: 61
- Losses: 7
- Draws: 5
- No contests: 1

Harry "Kid" Matthews (December 9, 1922 – February 21, 2003) was an American professional boxer who competed from 1938 to 1956. He climbed to the top contender rank at both light-heavyweight and heavyweight, and at his peak, won 50 consecutive fights. Although he never fought for a world title, he scored victories over several top contenders along with former champions Al Hostak and Ezzard Charles.

Matthews winning streak came to an end in 1952, when he lost to Rocky Marciano in a heavyweight title eliminator. Marciano went on to become the World Champion less than two months after their fight.

== Life and career ==
Harry Matthews was born in Emmett, Idaho, but soon after the family moved to Seattle. His father, Lou Matthews was a blacksmith, and helped Matthews pursue his new found passion for boxing beginning at the age of nine. It was while Matthews was still a teenager that his father pushed him to begin a professional boxing career as soon as possible.

=== Early career and military service ===
Matthews began his professional career in 1938, well before he had even turned 18 years old, but with the help of his father, was able to find professional fights. Because of his youth, he gained the nickname "Kid." During the early part of his career Matthews did very well for himself, fighting often against larger and more experienced opponents. Despite his age and inexperience, Matthews lost only three of his first 34 fights. During this time he scored a notable victory over the former middleweight champion Al Hostak, but lost subsequent fights against the much avoided Murderers' Row middleweights Jack Chase and Eddie Booker. His career came to a hiatus in 1943 once he was recruited into the American Army during World War II. He served in the Pacific, and fought at the Battle of Luzon. After the war Matthews was honorably discharged in 1946 at the rank of Corporal.

=== Return to boxing ===
After returning home, Matthews resumed his boxing career, and soon began a very long winning streak. Despite the victories, Matthews still struggled to move up in the ranks. This was mainly the result of his lack of management, and his defensive fighting style which crowds found unexciting. This all changed in 1949 when Matthews hired the famous boxing promoter Jack Hurley to be his manager. Under Hurley’s management, Matthews went up in weight, as Hurley wanted him fighting in the more lucrative heavyweight matches (despite being more accustomed to fighting middleweights and light-heavyweights at this point). He also adjusted Matthews fighting style, taking advantage of his punching power to make him more aggressive and crowd pleasing.

Hurly had Matthews fighting often, and his win streak continued while scoring many knockouts. Hurley drummed up much publicity with each of Matthews victories, building his fighter up as a serious contender. The plan worked, Matthews rose through the ranks and soon defeated #1 light-heavyweight contender Irish Bob Murphy. Now the top light-heavyweight contender, Matthews was offered a title fight with light-heavyweight champion Joey Maxim, but Hurly shockingly declined. Hurley claimed this was so Matthews could focus on fighting heavyweights, but ironically was also trying to get Matthews signed to fight middleweight champion Sugar Ray Robinson, but the fight never materialized. Although Matthews agreed with his manager’s decision, they had passed up Matthew’s best chance of winning a world title.

Matthews continued to rise through the heavyweight ranks, defeating notable contenders Lloyd Marshall, Freddie Beshore, Danny Nardico and top contender Rex Layne. Now a top contender himself, Matthews fought a 1952 title eliminator match against the other top contender, Rocky Marciano. Both men had impressive winning streaks; Marciano was unbeaten at 41-0 and had a high knockout percentage while Matthews had no losses since his return from the war and was currently on an incredible 50 fight win streak. Matthews attempted to box his opponent at range, but was unable to keep Marciano back. Despite a good performance in the first round, Matthews was soon knocked out by a vicious double left hook in the second.

After his defeat, Matthews continued his career but fought less often. He went on to lose a close trilogy of fights to British champion Don Cockell. The first two fights were very close on points and were controversial, but Matthews was stopped in their third fight when a back injury prevented him from continuing after the seventh round. After these defeats, Matthews scored a victory over former heavyweight champion Ezzard Charles in 1956, but only fought once more and retired later that year. In a career that spanned over 18 years, Matthews fought in over 100 professional fights, winning 90 (61 ending in knockout) and lost only 7 times.

=== After Boxing ===
Later in life, Harry Matthews was also a trainer of professional boxer Ibar Arrington. He was also involved in a variety of businesses, including owning a tavern and a welding company. Matthews died on February 21, 2003, in Seattle at the age of 80.

== Professional boxing record ==
103 fights	90 wins	7 losses
By knockout	61	3
By decision	29	4
Draws	5	
No contests	1	
