= Jersey Joe Walcott vs. Rocky Marciano =

Boxing match

- Date: September 23, 1952
- Venue: Municipal Stadium, Philadelphia, Pennsylvania, U.S.
- Title(s) on the line: NYSAC, NBA and The Ring undisputed heavyweight championship

Tale of the tape
| Boxer | Jersey Joe Walcott | Rocky Marciano |
| Nickname | | "The Brockton Blockbuster" |
| Hometown | Pennsauken Township, New Jersey, U.S. | Brockton, Massachusetts, U.S. |
| Pre-fight record | 49–18–1 (31 KO) | 42–0 (37 KO) |
| Age | 38 years, 7 months | 29 years |
| Height | 6 ft 0 in (183 cm) | 5 ft 10 in (178 cm) |
| Weight | 196 1/2 lb (89 kg) | 184 1/2 lb (84 kg) |
| Style | Orthodox | Orthodox |
| Recognition | NYSAC, NBA, and The Ring; Undisputed Heavyweight Champion | The Ring; No. 2 Ranked Heavyweight |

Result
- Marciano defeats Walcott by 13th round KO

Jersey Joe Walcott vs. Rocky Marciano was a professional boxing match contested on September 23, 1952, for the undisputed heavyweight championship.

Marciano, the undefeated challenger, scored 13th round knockout over world heavyweight champion Jersey Joe in a hard-fought championship fight. The fight was a major comeback victory for Marciano after Walcott had stacked up a wide lead throughout the majority of the bout.

== Background ==
During Jersey Joe Walcott's over two decade long boxing career, he would fight for the heavyweight championship several times. In four close fights, he lost title shots to Joe Louis and Ezzard Charles (twice to each), before finally winning the undisputed heavyweight title in 1951, after scoring a knockout victory over Charles in their third match. At the age of 37, Walcott was the oldest man to win the heavyweight championship (a record he held for over 40 years until he was surpassed by George Foreman in 1994). He defended his title with a 15-round unanimous decision in a fourth fight with Charles, before facing Marciano.

The 29 year old Rocky Marciano had built up an impressive record of 42 straight victories, winning all but five in knockout or stoppage. He rose into prominence in the early 1950s, scoring notable victories over several top contenders, including Joe Louis, before facing off with Walcott.

The two men signed to face other on 20 August, with the champion guaranteed 40% of the live gate and the challenger 20%.

Marciano was a slight favorite to beat the champion, though the more experienced Walcott entered the fight confident of victory.

== The fight ==
The fight proved to be a very hard-fought match for both men. Walcott spent most of the fight using his superior boxing skills and reach to keep the challenger on the outside, where he could more easily pick his shots and effectively counter Rocky's punches. Marciano attempted to close the distance, hoping to wear the champion down with constant punching. Walcott scored a knock down in the opening round (the first of only two times in Rocky's career that he was knocked off his feet), and from there put up a comfortable lead over the challenger, although Marciano kept constant pressure on the champion, scoring heavy blows through the fight.

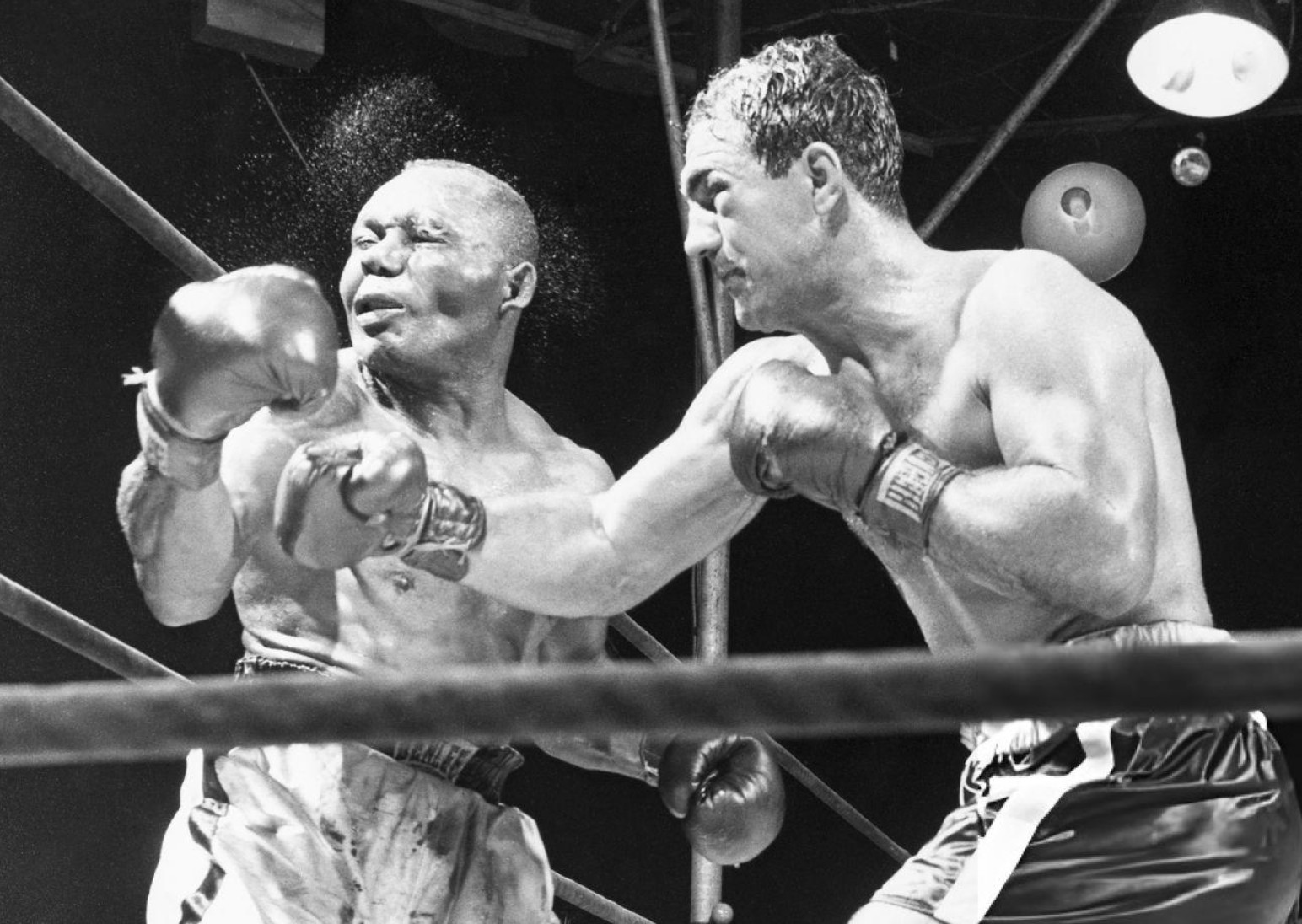
Photo of the knockout punch taken by Herb Scharfman

Going into the 13th round, Walcott was ahead on all scorecards (8–4 and 7–5 by the judges and 7–4 by referee Charley Daggert) and seemed poised to win the fight by a decision. This all changed less than a minute into the round, when Marciano landed a devastating right hook (just before Walcott could land one of his own) which knocked the champion out cold giving him a 13th-round knockout victory, and was now the new undisputed heavyweight champion of the world.

== Aftermath ==
The fight and the final round were ranked as 1952's fight and round of the year respectively by The Ring, and is considered one of the greatest heavyweight championship bouts of all time.

The two fighters had a rematch the following year, and saw Marciano's first successful defense of his title, winning a quick victory over the former champion.

== Legacy ==
Marciano and Walcott's first fight is regarded as one of the greatest in boxing history, being named 1952's fight of the year by The Ring. The fight was also ranked the 16th greatest fight of all time by both The Ring and BoxRec, while Bleacher Report ranked it as the 10th greatest heavyweight match of all time.

== Undercard ==
Confirmed bouts:

| Preceded by vs. Ezzard Charles IV | Jersey Joe Walcott's bouts 23 September 1952 | Succeeded by Rematch |
| Preceded by vs. Harry Matthews | Rocky Marciano's bouts 23 September 1952 | Succeeded by Rematch |
Awards
| Previous: Ezzard Charles vs. Jersey Joe Walcott III | The Ring Fight of the Year; 1952 | Succeeded by Rocky Marciano vs. Roland La Starza II |
| Preceded by Joe Louis vs. Rocky Marciano; Round 8 | The Ring Round of the Year; Round 13; 1952 | Succeeded by Kid Gavilán vs. Carmen Basilio; Round 2 |
