= Rex Layne =

American boxer (1928–2000)

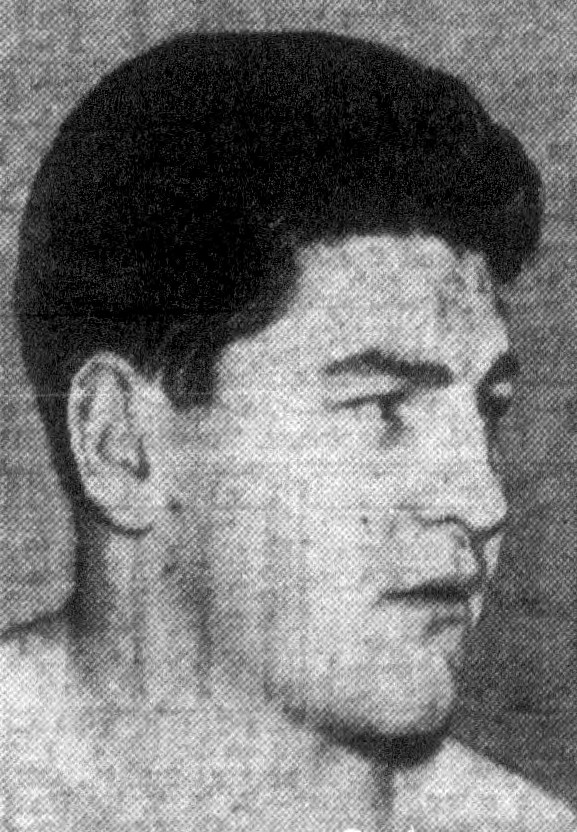
- Layne, circa 1951

Personal information
- Nationality: American
- Born: June 7, 1928 Lewiston, Utah
- Died: June 7, 2000 (aged 72)
- Height: 6 ft 1 in (1.85 m)
- Weight: Heavyweight

Boxing career
- Stance: Orthodox

Boxing record
- Total fights: 70
- Wins: 50
- Win by KO: 34
- Losses: 17
- Draws: 3

Rex Gessel Layne (June 7, 1928 – June 7, 2000) was an American heavyweight professional boxer. Sometimes termed the "Lewiston Larruper" and later "Poor Ole Rex", Layne became a top contender in the early 1950s, although he never fought for the heavyweight title. Despite this he notched victories over many top rated boxers of his era, including heavyweight champions Ezzard Charles and Jersey Joe Walcott.

== Biography ==
Rex Layne was born on June 7, 1928 in Lewiston, Utah and was a member of the Church of Jesus Christ of Latter-day Saints. During World War II, Layne served in the 11th Airborne Division, and held the rank of staff sergeant. He served for 19 months and was part of the occupation forces in Japan. It was during this time that Layne began to box. When the army sent out a call for boxing candidates at Sapporo, Japan, he won a heavyweight tournament for his troops in the region.

=== Amateur career ===
Returning home in 1947, Layne began a successful amateur boxing career, though he dropped a close decision in an Olympic tryout to Jay Lambert, who won the United States Olympic title, and lost a decision in the London Olympics semifinals. Layne lost a close verdict to Utah State's Dale Panter in the Utah Golden Gloves, but earned a trip to Boston acquiring the A.A.U. Intermountain amateur championship by a knockout. In the Hub he won four bouts, three by knockouts, to account for the national championship.

Rex Layne was a Salt Lake City sugar beet farmer when he won the 1949 National AAU Heavyweight Championship.

=== Professional career ===
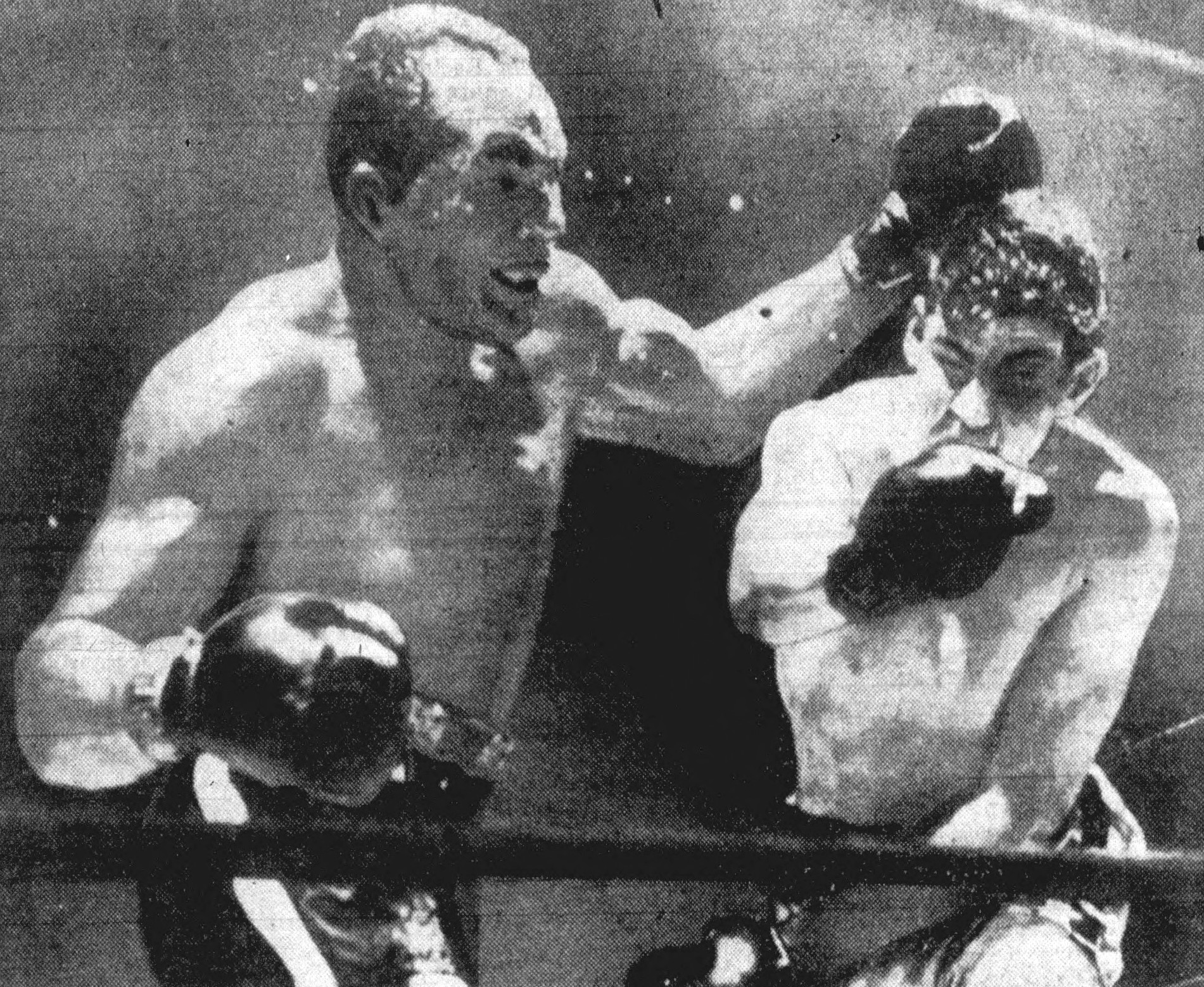
Layne (right) fighting future heavyweight champion Jersey Joe Walcott in 1950

Layne began his profession career in 1949. He started strong and was undefeated his first 17 fights. Before Layne's career declined in the mid-1950s, boxing historian Nat Fleischer wrote of the boxer, "Layne looms as the outstanding prospect west of the Mississippi. He is a hard hitter... Layne has what it takes to be developed into the next world heavyweight king. He can hit and has an abundance of courage." In May 1951 Layne was featured on the cover of The Ring magazine.

In the early 1950’s Layne rose through the heavyweight ranks, scoring notable victories over former heavyweight champion Ezzard Charles, and future heavyweight champion Jersey Joe Walcott. He also defeated the hard hitting Bob Satterfield. Layne was quickly becoming one of the most well known and promising contenders of the era, but on July 12, 1951, he lost by 6th round KO to Rocky Marciano. Marciano's knockout punch sheared off four of Layne's upper, front teeth at the gum line and sent his mouthpiece bouncing with teeth included across the ring.

Although Layne remained in the top ranks, he went on to lose on points to top contenders Harry Matthews and Roland La Starza, the later being in a 1953 heavyweight title eliminator, both men attempting to get a rematch with the new heavyweight champion Marciano. From there Layne’s career began to decline, though he continued to fight top rated opposition. He lost two fights with Charles, three with Bob Baker, and later lost fights with Tommy Jackson and future light-heavyweight champion Willie Pastrano. Layne retired from boxing in 1956.

Heavyweight Action ranked Rex Layne as the 11th best heavyweight boxer of the decade of the 1950s, with the top 3 spots held by Marciano, Walcott and Charles.

=== After boxing ===
In 1968, Layne had a bit part in the movie "The Devil's Brigade," starring William Holden. Such other former athletes as Paul Hornung and Gene Fullmer also had small roles. Layne passed away on his 72nd birthday in 2000.
