= Muhammad Ali vs. Floyd Patterson =

Boxing match

- Date: November 22, 1965
- Venue: Las Vegas Convention Center, Las Vegas, Nevada
- Title(s) on the line: WBC, NYSAC and The Ring heavyweight titles

Tale of the tape
Boxer	(United States) Muhammad Ali	(United States) Floyd Patterson
Nickname	"The Greatest"	"The Gentleman of Boxing"
Hometown	Louisville, Kentucky	Waco, North Carolina
Pre-fight record	21–0 (17 KO)	43–4 (31 KO)
Age	23 years, 10 months	30 years, 10 months
Height	6 ft 3 in (191 cm)	6 ft 0 in (183 cm)
Weight	210 lb (95 kg)	196 3/4 lb (89 kg)
Style	Orthodox	Orthodox
Recognition	WBC, NYSAC and The Ring; Heavyweight Champion	WBC; No. 1 Ranked Heavyweight; Former two time heavyweight champion

Result
- Ali won via 12th round TKO

Muhammad Ali vs. Floyd Patterson was a professional boxing match contested on November 22, 1965, for the WBC, NYSAC and The Ring championship.

== Background ==
Patterson won the world heavyweight title in 1956, and became the first fighter to win it back in 1960 (after losing to Ingemar Johansson in 1959). Patterson lost the title again in a 1962 fight against top contender Sonny Liston in a 1st-round knockout. In a 1963 rematch, Patterson lost again in the 1st round. Liston later lost the title to Muhammad Ali (then still known as Cassius Clay) in 1964. Meanwhile, Patterson went on to win fights against top contenders Eddie Machen and George Chuvalo. Patterson was now the number-one challenger for the title held by Ali.

== The fight ==
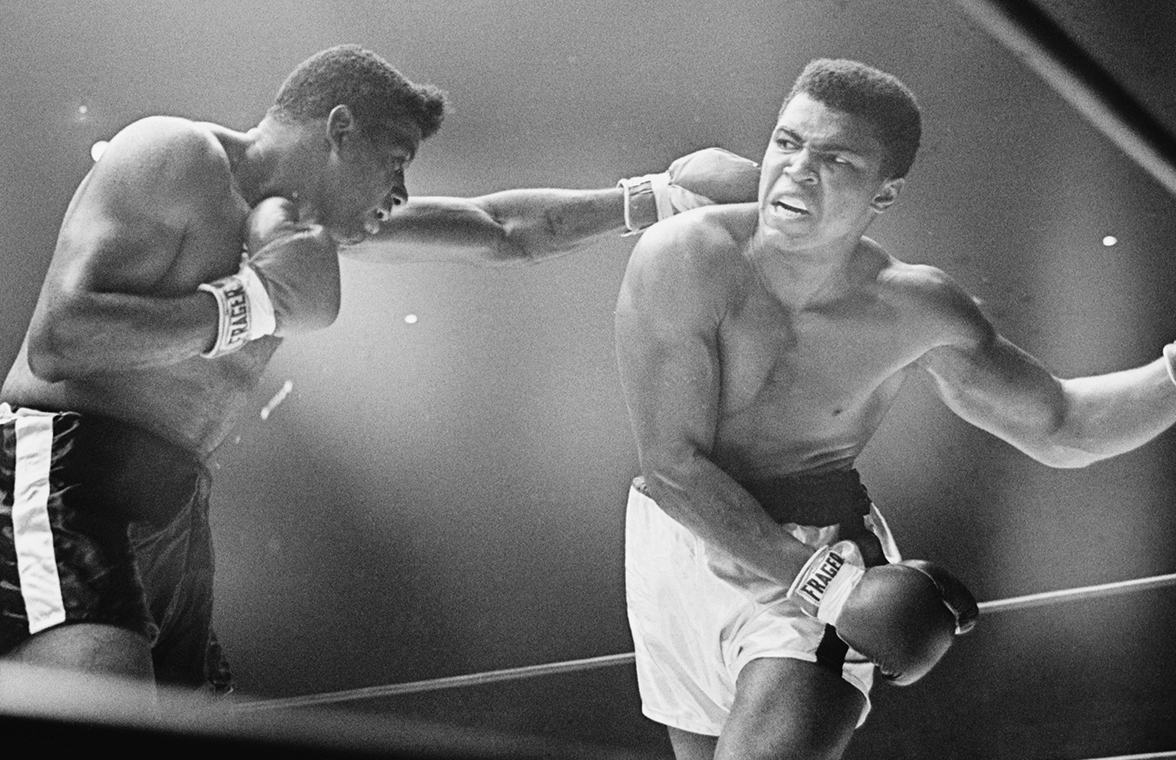
Ali (right) and Patterson (left) in action

Patterson suffered from a ruptured sacroiliac joint in his lower back which greatly reduced his mobility after the first round, and his corner worked on his back in between rounds to help reduce the pain. Ali relentlessly jabbed Patterson from the second round until the referee stopped the fight in the 12th round, giving Ali a TKO victory.

A New York Times reporter described the fight as like watching someone "pulling the wings off a butterfly."

== Aftermath ==
In the post-fight interview, Ali praised Patterson for being able to take punches and said Patterson's age counted against him.

=== Rematch ===
On September 20, 1972, Patterson fought Ali for the second time. At age 37, Patterson was stopped due to a cut eye at the end of the 7th round. The defeat was Patterson's last fight.

== Undercard ==
Confirmed bouts:

== Broadcasting ==
Country	Broadcaster
United Kingdom	BBC

Preceded by vs. Sonny Liston II	Muhammad Ali's bouts 22 November 1965	Succeeded by vs. George Chuvalo
Preceded by vs. Tod Herring	Floyd Patterson's bouts 22 November 1965	Succeeded by vs. Henry Cooper
