= Muhammad Ali vs. Floyd Patterson II =

Boxing competition

- Date: September 20, 1972
- Venue: Madison Square Garden, New York City, New York
- Title(s) on the line: NABF heavyweight title

Tale of the tape
| Boxer | (United States) Muhammad Ali | (United States) Floyd Patterson |
| Nickname | "The Greatest" | "The Gentleman of Boxing" |
| Hometown | Louisville, Kentucky | Waco, North Carolina |
| Purse | $250,000 | $100,000 |
| Pre-fight record | 38–1 (27 KO) | 55–7–1 (40 KO) |
| Age | 30 years, 8 months | 37 years, 8 months |
| Height | 6 ft 3 in (191 cm) | 6 ft 0 in (183 cm) |
| Weight | 218 lb (99 kg) | 188 1/2 lb (86 kg) |
| Style | Orthodox | Orthodox |
| Recognition | NABF heavyweight champion Former undisputed heavyweight champion | Former 2 time undisputed heavyweight champion |

Result
- Ali defeats Patterson 7th round corner retirement

Muhammad Ali vs. Floyd Patterson II was a professional boxing match contested on September 20, 1972, for the NABF championship. It followed Patterson's victory over Oscar Bonavena in February 1972. The fight lasted for 7 rounds. After the ringside doctor inspected eye between rounds, referee Arthur Mercante Sr. stopped Patterson from coming out for the eighth round, giving Ali a RTD (retired) victory. This was Patterson's last fight of his career.

== Background ==
After his decision victory over Oscar Bonavena in February 1972, Floyd Patterson signed to face fellow former heavyweight champion Muhammad Ali at Madison Square Garden on 28 August. The two had faced off seven years earlier when Ali had dominated Patterson in a performance described as like watching someone "pulling the wings off a butterfly.

Patterson had been set to rematch Ali in 1967 but Ali's ban from boxing ended those hopes. The fight was pushed back to 20 September.

== The fight ==
For the first two rounds Ali danced around Patterson, controlling the range with the jab, while Patterson found occasional success with a lunging left hook. Ali landed a flush overhand right in the third, while Patterson's hooks forced Ali to keep a tight guard. A series of hooks from Ali in the sixth caused swelling above Patterson's left eye which kept him on the back foot throughout the seventh as the eye swelled shut.

After the ringside doctor inspected eye between rounds, referee Arthur Mercante Sr. stopped Patterson from coming out for the eighth giving Ali a RTD (retired) victory.

== Aftermath ==
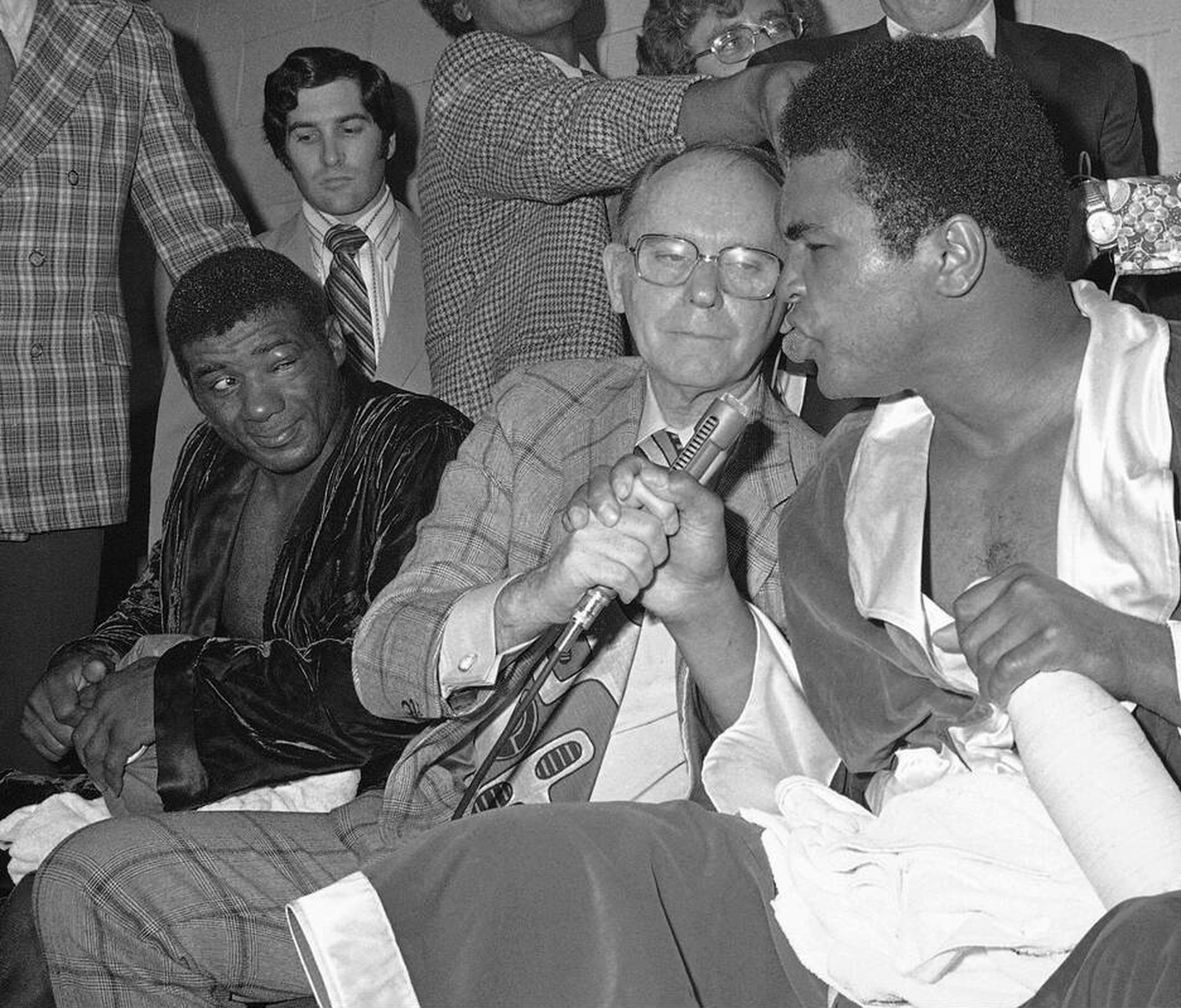
Ali and Patterson after the fight

This defeat was Patterson's last fight, although he never formally announced his retirement.

== Undercard ==
Confirmed bouts:

== Broadcasting ==
| Country | Broadcaster |
|---|---|
| Mexico | Telesistema Mexicano |
| Philippines | ABS-CBN |
| United Kingdom | ITV |
| United States | ABC |

| Preceded by vs. Al Lewis | Muhammad Ali's bouts 20 September 1972 | Succeeded by vs. Bob Foster |
| Preceded by vs. Pedro Agosto | Floyd Patterson's bouts 20 September 1972 | Retired |
