= Arthur Mercante Sr. =

American boxer and referee

- Born: Arthur Mercante; January 26, 1920; Brockton, Massachusetts, U.S.
- Died: April 10, 2010 (aged 90); Westbury, New York, U.S.
- Education: New York University
- Occupation: boxing referee
- Years active: 1956–2005
- Spouse: Gloria
- Children: 4 (Including Arthur Jr.)

Arthur Mercante Sr. (January 26, 1920 – April 10, 2010) was an American boxing referee. His career spanned from 1954 until 2002.

== Early life ==
Mercante was born in Brockton, Massachusetts and moved with his family to Brooklyn at age 7. During his teenage years, he fought in the Golden Gloves as a welterweight and graduated from Boys High School in 1938. In his youth, Mercante was a member of the Merchant Marines.

He earned Bachelor and Master of Science degrees from New York University in 1942 and 1947 respectively, the latter after serving in the United States Navy during World War II as a boxing instructor as part of a physical training program headed by heavyweight champion Gene Tunney. After the war he refereed Golden Gloves and college bouts and became varsity boxing coach at the United States Merchant Marine Academy until the sport was phased out at the intercollegiate level.

== Professional career ==
His career as a referee began in 1954 and lasted almost five decades, when he officially retired.

His first title bout was the second fight between Floyd Patterson and Ingemar Johansson. Johansson had won the world heavyweight title in the first fight. In the second fight, Patterson became the first fighter to regain the heavyweight title.

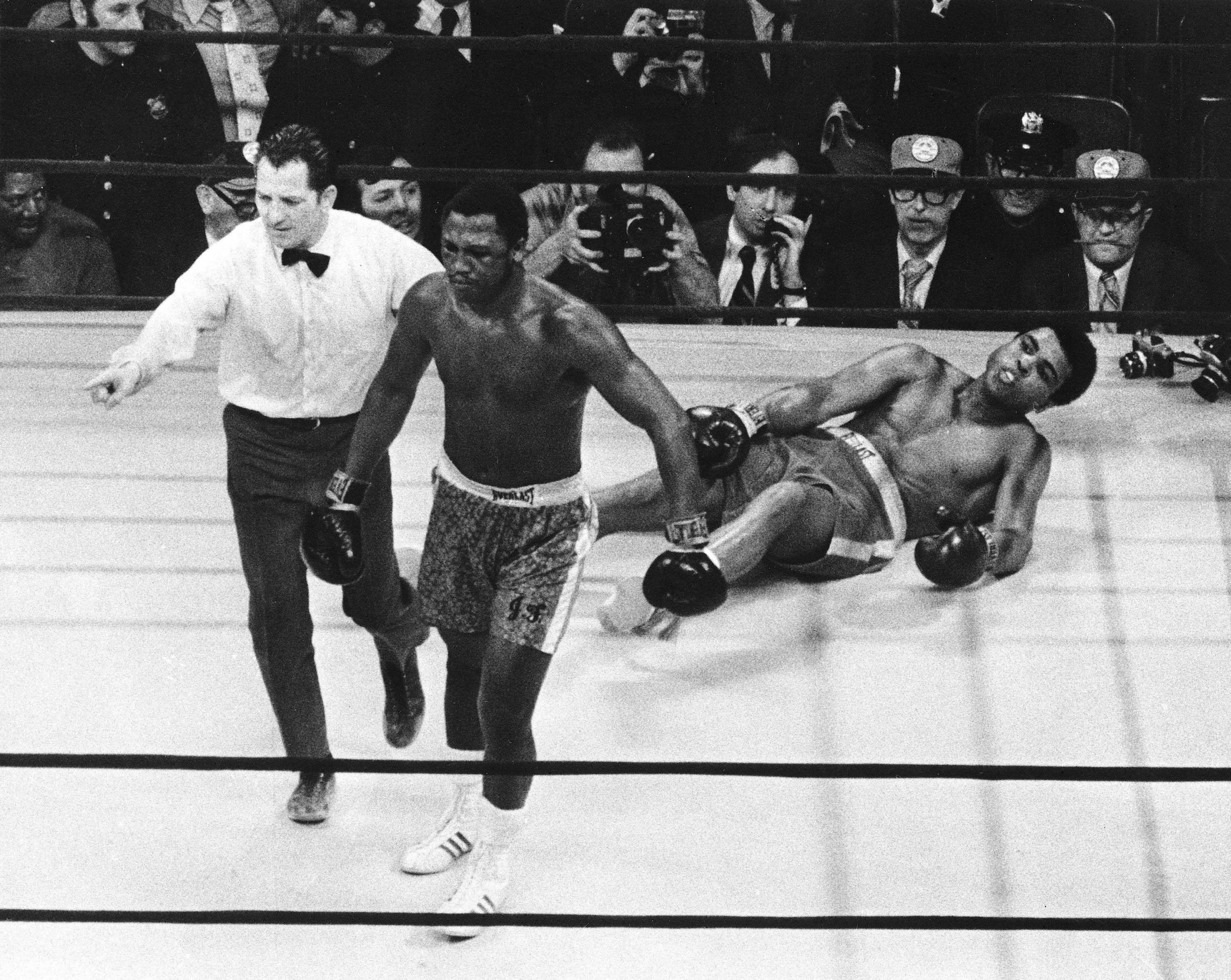
Mercante directing Joe Frazier away from Muhammad Ali Ali during the 15th round of their fight

Mercante was also the referee for many notable bouts, including the first Muhammad Ali-Joe Frazier fight on March 8, 1971, the first bout between George Foreman and Joe Frazier, the fight between Jerry Quarry and Earnie Shavers, the first bout between Alexis Arguello and Alfredo Escalera, the Wilfredo Gomez-Lupe Pintor fight, the first bout between Edwin Rosario and Jose Luis Ramirez and Rosario's bout with Hector Camacho Sr.

Mercante's son (Arthur Jr.) also became a noted referee.

== Personal life ==
He was the first contestant on the June 26, 1960 edition of the television game show What's My Line? Refereeing was his avocation and the line the panel looked for was his vocation; that of beer salesman. He worked with Rheingold at the time and later moved to Schaefer in a similar capacity.

Mercante was fit and in shape well into his 80s, often doing a variety of exercises on a daily basis like the jump rope. In 1995 he was inducted into the International Boxing Hall of Fame in Canastota, New York.

== Literature ==
- Inside the Ropes: Arthur Mercante.Arthur Mercante, Bert Randolph Sugar, Phil Guarnieri, 2006
- Der dritte Mann im Ring - Arthur Mercante: Mein Leben als Boxrichter. Arthur Mercante, Bert Randolph Sugar, Phil Guarnieri, Aus dem Amerikanischen von Patrick Bartsch, Zürich 2012, Römerhof Verlag, ISBN 978-3-905894-09-7
