= Floyd Patterson vs. Sonny Liston =

Boxing competition

- Date: September 25, 1962
- Venue: Comiskey Park, Chicago, Illinois
- Title(s) on the line: WBA, NYSAC, and The Ring undisputed heavyweight championship

Tale of the tape
Boxer	(United States) Floyd Patterson	(United States) Sonny Liston
Nickname	"The Gentleman of Boxing"	"Big Bear"
Hometown	Yonkers, New York	Sand Slough, Arkansas
Pre-fight record	38–2 (28 KO)	33–1 (22 KO)
Age	27 years, 8 months	31–32
Height	6 ft 0 in (183 cm)	6 ft 1 in (185 cm)
Weight	189 lb (86 kg)	213 lb (97 kg)
Style	Orthodox	Orthodox
Recognition	WBA, NYSAC and The Ring undisputed Heavyweight Champion	WBA/The Ring; No. 1 Ranked Heavyweight

Result
- Liston defeated Patterson via first round KO

Floyd Patterson vs. Sonny Liston was a professional boxing match contested on September 25, 1962, for the undisputed heavyweight championship. Liston knocked Patterson in the first round winning the championship in a dominant fashion.

== Background ==
Following the retirement of Rocky Marciano, 22 year old Floyd Patterson had won the boxing heavyweight championship in 1956, beating light heavyweight champion Archie Moore (Patterson was the youngest heavyweight champion at the time). While Patterson was defending his title, Liston started climbing through the heavyweight ranks in the late 50's. By the turn of the decade, Liston had become the number one contender, defeating nearly all top contenders by knockout and gaining one of the most fearsome reputations in heavyweight history.

In 1959, Patterson lost the world title to Ingemar Johansson, only to win it back the following year (becoming the first fighter in history to win the heavyweight championship twice). Even though Liston was the clear contender, Patterson's manager and trainer Cus D'Amato was very adamant for his fighter not to fight Liston. Aside from the fact that D’Amato believed Patterson's chances were low, he also denounced Liston's connections with gangsters (including his management), an issue that the public shared. Liston held the number one spot throughout the early 1960s, and despite the discouragement from not only his management but from President John F. Kennedy during a visit to the White House in 1962, Patterson ultimately decided to give Liston a shot to fight for the title.

The fight took place in late September 1962, the two meeting in Chicago. It was a rare case in which the champion entered the fight an underdog, with Liston an 8-5 betting favorite over Patterson, although many writers and celebrities still had faith Patterson could pull off another victory.

== The fight ==
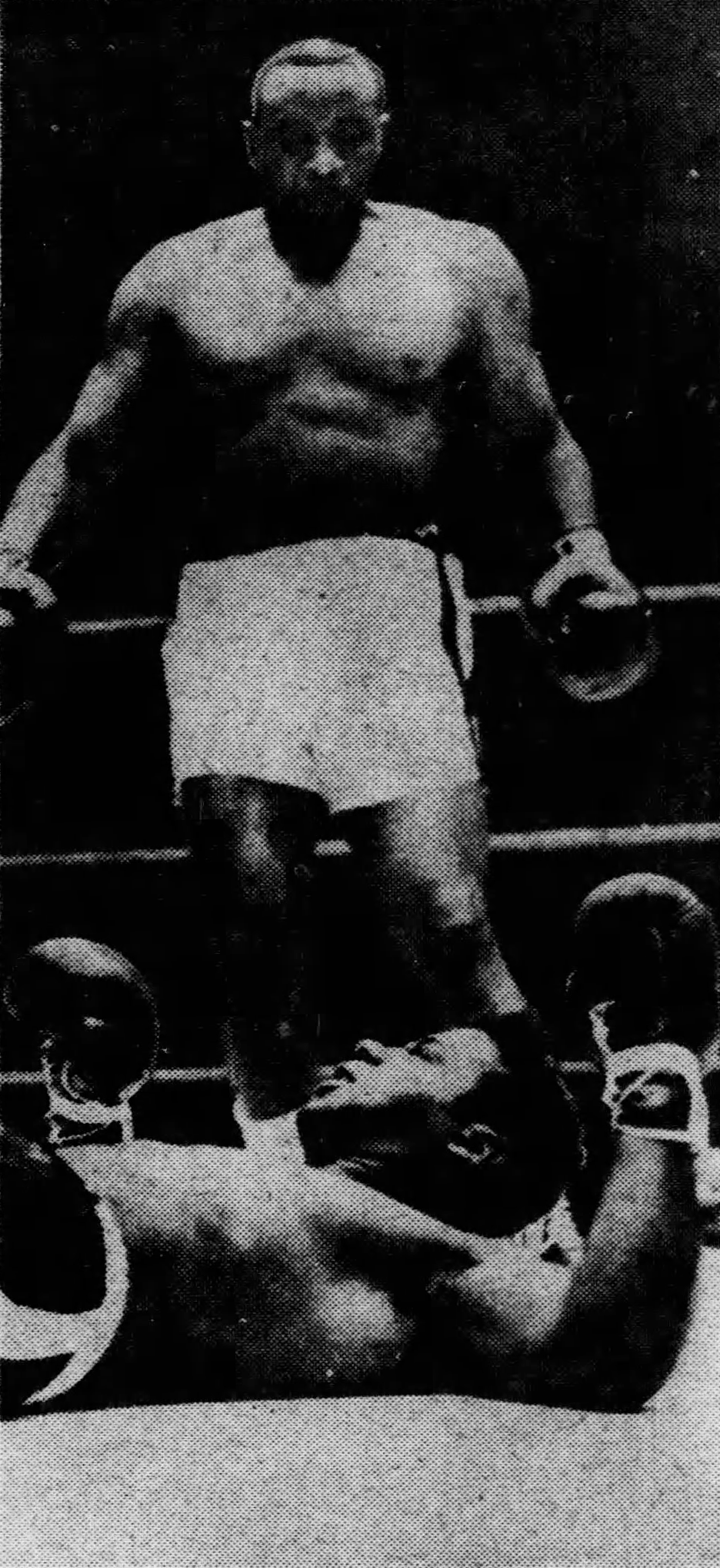
Liston stands over a defeated Patterson

Patterson immediately faced difficulty with Liston's larger size, particularly his seven foot long reach and powerful jab. Patterson bravely attempted to close the distance with the challenger by using his faster hand speed and head movement, but soon began to take powerful hooks and combinations from Liston both at long and short range. Just two minutes into the first round, a hurt Patterson found himself up against the ropes, and took two powerful left hooks to the jaw, knocking him out. Liston had finally become the new heavyweight champion.

== Aftermath ==
=== Rematch ===
Patterson had the contractual right to a rematch within a year, and the two had a much delayed rematch in Las Vegas in July 1963. It was the first million-dollar purse with both fighters receiving $1,434,000 each. Liston was favored 4–1, and had trained less for what he expected to be another quick victory. Although Patterson did manage to land a few more combinations, he was still unable to hold the champion off or significantly close the distance. Liston would soon land a series of thunderous punches to the head of Patterson, sending him to the ground. Patterson got up and fought on, but was soon knocked down a second time. Patterson once again beat the count but was quickly dropped a third time, and this time would be counted out. The rematch only lasted four seconds longer than the first fight.

This match was also notable as it was the first heavyweight title fight of the new international boxing organization, the World Boxing Council (which had formed earlier that year), making Liston the inaugural WBC heavyweight champion.

== Undercard ==
Confirmed bouts:

Preceded by vs. Tom McNeeley	Floyd Patterson's bouts 25 September 1962	Succeeded by Rematch
Preceded by vs. Albert Westphal	Sonny Liston's bouts 25 September 1962	Succeeded by Rematch
Awards
Preceded by Floyd Patterson vs. Ingemar Johansson III; Round 1	The Ring Round of the Year; Round 1; 1962	Succeeded by Sonny Liston vs. Floyd Patterson II; Round 1
