= Sonny Liston vs. Floyd Patterson II =

Boxing match

- Date: July 22, 1963
- Venue: Las Vegas Convention Center, Las Vegas, Nevada
- Title(s) on the line: WBA, WBC, NYSAC, and The Ring undisputed heavyweight championship

Tale of the tape
Boxer	(United States) Sonny Liston	(United States) Floyd Patterson
Nickname	"Big Bear"	"The Gentleman of Boxing"
Hometown	Sand Slough, Arkansas	Yonkers, New York
Purse	$1,434,000	$1,434,000
Pre-fight record	34–1 (23 KO)	38–3 (28 KO)
Age	32–33	28 years, 6 months
Height	6 ft 1 in (185 cm)	6 ft 0 in (183 cm)
Weight	215 1/2 lb (98 kg)	194 1/2 lb (88 kg)
Style	Orthodox	Orthodox
Recognition	WBA, NYSAC and The Ring undisputed Heavyweight Champion	WBA/The Ring; No. 1 Ranked Heavyweight; Former Two time Heavyweight Champion

Result
- Liston defeated Patterson via first round KO

Sonny Liston vs. Floyd Patterson II was a professional boxing match contested on July 22, 1963, for the undisputed heavyweight championship.

== Background ==
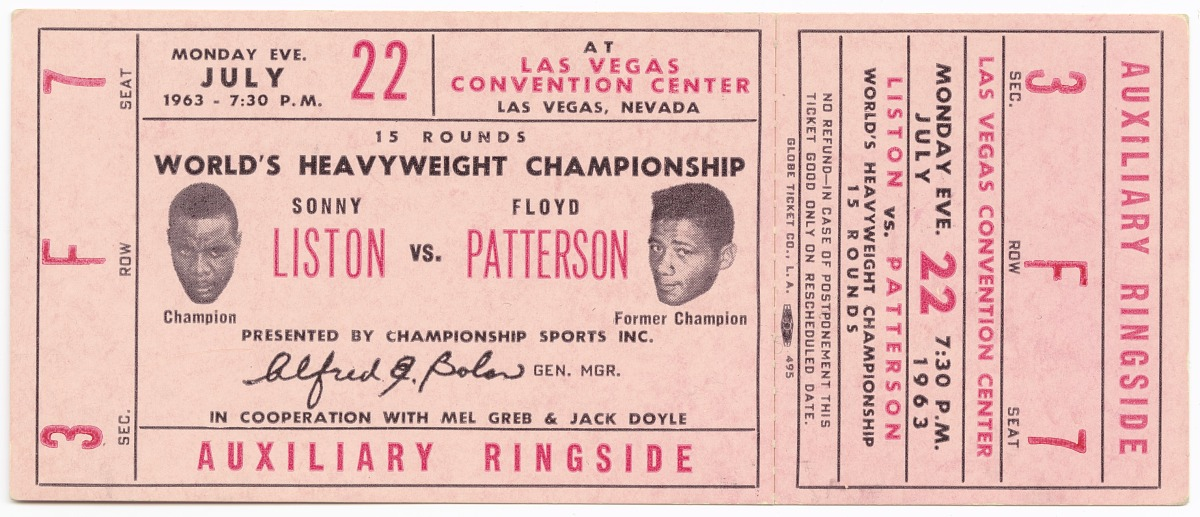
Original ticket for Liston-Patterson II

After Liston's first round stoppage victory over Patterson in September 1962, Patterson had the contractual right to a rematch within a year. The fight was originally set for April 4 in Miami Beach, Florida, but was changed to April 10 following a left knee injury for Liston. It was later moved back to June 27 in Las Vegas, Nevada, because of a recurrence of the knee injury. The bout was postponed yet again and rescheduled for July 22 after Patterson had to have a benign tumour removed from between his fourth and fifth knuckles on his right hand.

It was the first million-dollar purse with both fighters receiving $1,434,000 each. It was also notable as it was the first heavyweight title fight of the new international boxing organization, the World Boxing Council.

Liston was the 4–1 favourite, and had trained less for what he expected to be another quick victory.

== The fight ==
Although Patterson did manage to land a few more combinations than in the first bout, he was still unable to hold the champion off or significantly close the distance. Liston would soon land a series of thunderous punches to the head of Patterson, sending him to the ground. Patterson got up and fought on, but was soon knocked down a second time. Patterson once again beat the count but was quickly dropped a third time, and this time would be counted out.

The rematch only lasted four seconds longer than the first fight.

== Aftermath ==
Liston's victory was loudly booed. "The public is not with me. I know it", Liston said afterward. "But they'll have to swing along until somebody comes to beat me."

On August 21 the WBA voted to suspend any member state approving a contract with a return bout clause.

The fight's sole round was awarded The Ring magazine Round of the Year, marking the fifth straight year that a bout featuring Patterson had received that honour. Beating the record previously held by his former rival Ingemar Johansson.

== Legacy ==
The two fights with Patterson solidified Liston's longstanding reputation as the most intimidating man in the sport, and gave many fans and even writers the impression that he was a nearly unstoppable fighter. His next fight would be in early 1964 against a young rising contender Cassius Clay. Clay won in what was considered a major upset, and won again in a controversial rematch the following year.

Both fighters continued their respective careers, and although neither fighter could win back the title, they were both still able to win many more victories and continued to stay in the top ranks throughout the 1960s. Liston's final fight was in 1970, defeating Chuck Wepner, only to die later that year. Patterson retired from boxing in 1972 following an unsuccessful rematch with Ali for the NABF heavyweight title.

The match was mentioned in Billy Joel's song "We Didn't Start the Fire".

== Undercard ==
Confirmed bouts:

== Broadcasting ==
Country	Broadcaster
United Kingdom	BBC

Preceded by First bout	Sonny Liston's bouts 22 July 1963	Succeeded by vs. Cassius Clay
Preceded by First bout	Floyd Patterson's bouts 22 July 1963	Succeeded by vs. Santo Amonti
Awards
Preceded by Floyd Patterson vs. Sonny Liston; Round 1	The Ring Round of the Year; Round 1; 1963	Succeeded by José Torres vs. Bobo Olson; Round 1
