= Floyd Patterson =

American boxer (1935–2006)

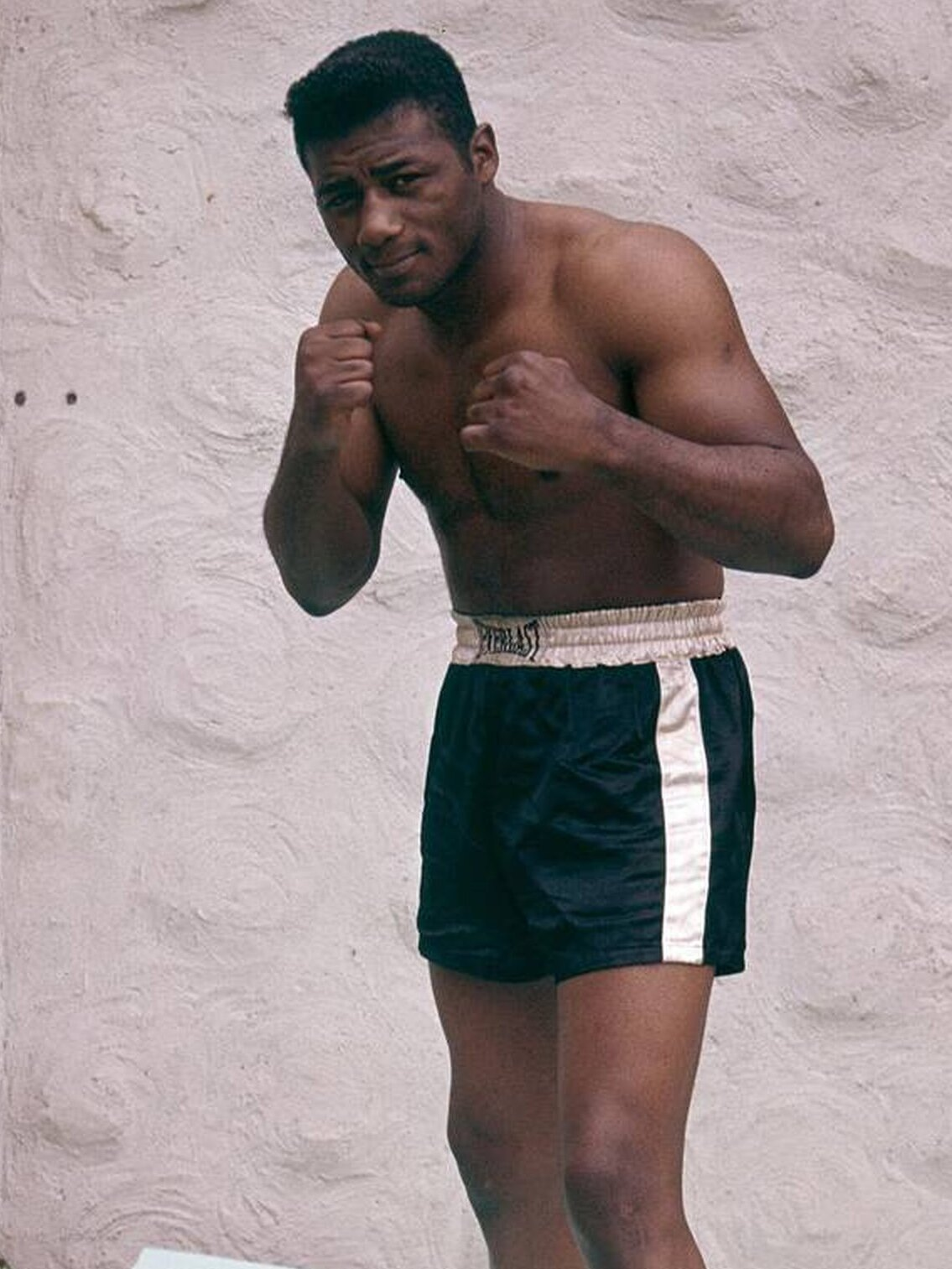
- Patterson in 1958

Personal information
- Nickname: The Gentleman of Boxing
- Born: January 4, 1935 Waco, North Carolina, U.S.
- Died: May 11, 2006 (aged 71) New Paltz, New York, U.S.
- Height: 6 ft 0 in (183 cm)
- Weight: Light heavyweight; Heavyweight

Boxing career
- Reach: 71 in (180 cm)
- Stance: Orthodox

Boxing record
- Total fights: 64
- Wins: 55
- Win by KO: 40
- Losses: 8
- Draws: 1
Medal record
Men's amateur boxing
Representing United States
Olympic Games
Gold medal – first place	1952 Helsinki	Middleweight

Floyd Patterson (January 4, 1935 – May 11, 2006) was an American professional boxer who competed from 1952 to 1972, and twice reigned as the world heavyweight champion between 1956 and 1962. At the age of 21, he became the youngest boxer in history to win the title, and was also the first heavyweight to regain the title after losing it. As an amateur, he won a gold medal in the middleweight division at the 1952 Summer Olympics. He has been named among the top 15 heavyweights of all time.

In 1956 and 1960, Patterson was voted Fighter of the Year by The Ring magazine and the Boxing Writers Association of America (BWAA). He was inducted into the International Boxing Hall of Fame in 1991. In 1995, Patterson was honored with the Barney Nagler Award by the BWAA in recognition of his long and meritorious service.

== Early life ==
Floyd Patterson was born in Waco, North Carolina on January 4, 1935 into an impoverished family. In 1936, he, his parents, and his ten other siblings moved to New York City, settling in the Bedford–Stuyvesant neighborhood located in Brooklyn, a borough of New York City.

During this time, his parents were working extremely hard to provide for the family. There were eleven children to feed. Patterson felt helpless that he could not help his mother and father more. He felt stupid and powerless. Starting at the age of nine, Floyd became a truant and petty thief. It began with him stealing little things like milk and fruit to bring back to his mother to help. However, as he transitioned into a teenager, he would frequently be seen in court for stealing, truancy, and running away. He estimated that he had been in court, thirty to forty times. At age 10, a judge was so tired of seeing him in court that he was sent to the Wiltwyck School for Boys, a reform school in Esopus, New York, in September 1945. During this time, he was furious thinking he was being sent to jail until his mother explained the blessing. He credited this to turning his life around. He stayed there for almost two years. He attended high school in New Paltz, New York, where he succeeded in all sports.

Patterson took up boxing at age fourteen, and was training with the Bedford-Stuyvesant Boxing Association Gym. Three years later, he won the gold medal in the 1952 Helsinki Olympics as a middleweight. In 1952, he won the National Amateur Middleweight Championship and New York Golden Gloves Middleweight Championship. At that time he was spotted by Cus D'Amato, and trained at the Gramercy Gym.

Patterson's younger brother Raymond (born 1942) also became a professional heavyweight boxer. He has lived in Gothenburg, Sweden, since 1965 and has worked as a truck driver at Volvo Lastvagnar after his boxing career.

=== Olympic results ===
- Round of 16: Defeated Omar Tebakka (France) on points, 3–0
- Quarterfinal: Defeated Leonardus Jansen (Netherlands) by a first-round stoppage
- Semifinal: Defeated Stig Sjölin (Sweden) by disqualification in the third round
- Defeated Vasile Tiță (Romania) by a first-round knockout

Patterson's amateur record was 40 wins (37 by knockout) and 4 defeats. He carried his hands higher than most boxers, in front of his face. Sportswriters called Patterson's style a "peek-a-boo" stance.

== Professional career ==
Patterson turned pro and steadily rose through the ranks, his only early defeat being an eight-round decision to former light heavyweight champion Joey Maxim on June 7, 1954, at the Eastern Parkway Arena in Brooklyn, New York.

=== Championship ===
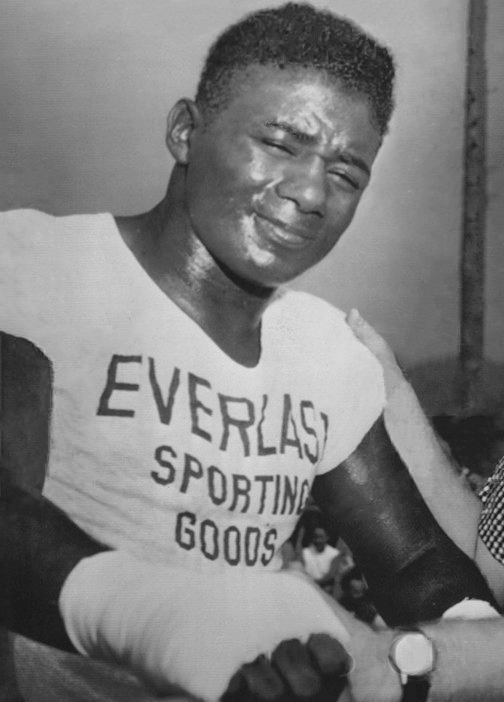
Patterson in 1957

Although Patterson fought around the light heavyweight limit for much of his early career, he and manager Cus D'Amato always had plans to fight for the Heavyweight Championship. In fact, D'Amato made these plans clear as early as 1954, when he told the press that Patterson was aiming for the heavyweight title. However, after Rocky Marciano announced his retirement as World Heavyweight Champion on April 27, 1956, Patterson was ranked by The Ring magazine as the top light heavyweight contender. After Marciano's announcement, Jim Norris of the International Boxing Club stated that Patterson was one of the six fighters who would take part in an elimination tournament to crown Marciano's successor. The Ring then moved Patterson into the heavyweight rankings, at number five.

==== Patterson vs. Moore ====
After beating Tommy "Hurricane" Jackson in an elimination fight, Patterson faced Light Heavyweight Champion Archie Moore on November 30, 1956, for the World Heavyweight Championship. He beat Moore by a knockout in five rounds and became the youngest World Heavyweight Champion in history, at the age of 21 years, 10 months, 3 weeks and 5 days. He was the first Olympic gold medalist to win a professional heavyweight title.

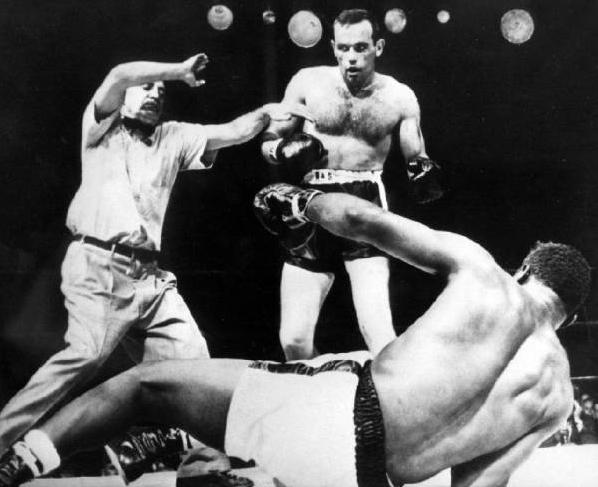
Ingemar Johansson knocks out Floyd Patterson and becomes boxing heavyweight champion of the world, June 26, 1959.

==== Patterson vs. Johansson I, II & III ====
After a series of defenses against fringe contenders (Hurricane Jackson, Pete Rademacher, Roy Harris, and Brian London), Patterson met Ingemar Johansson of Sweden, the number one contender, in the first of three fights. Johansson triumphed over Patterson on June 26, 1959, with the referee Ruby Goldstein stopping the fight in the third round after the Swede had knocked Patterson down seven times. Johansson became Sweden's first World Heavyweight Champion, thus becoming a national hero as the first European to defeat an American for the title since 1933.

Patterson knocked out Johansson in the fifth round of their rematch on June 20, 1960, to become the first man in history to regain the Undisputed World Heavyweight Championship. Johansson hit the canvas hard, seemingly out before he landed flat on his back. With glazed eyes, blood trickling from his mouth and his left foot quivering, he was counted out, Johansson laying unconscious for five minutes before he was helped onto a stool.

A third fight between them was held on March 13, 1961, and while Johansson put Patterson on the floor, Patterson retained his title by knockout in the sixth round to win the rubber match in which Patterson was decked twice and Johansson once, in the first round. Johansson had landed both right hands over Floyd's left jab. After getting up from the second knockdown, Floyd abandoned his jab and connected with a left hook that knocked down Johansson. After that, Patterson came on with a strong body attack that wore down Johansson. In the sixth round, Johansson caught Patterson with a solid right. But the power in Johansson's punches was gone. Patterson won the fight in the sixth round by knockout.

After the third Johansson fight, Patterson defended the title in Toronto on December 4 against Tom McNeeley and retained the title with a fourth-round knockout. However he did not fight number-one contender Sonny Liston. This was due in part to Cus D'Amato, who did not want Patterson in the ring with a boxer with mob connections. As a result, D'Amato turned down any challenges involving the IBC. Eventually, due to a monetary dispute with Jimmy Jacobs, Patterson removed D'Amato from handling his business affairs and agreed to fight Liston.

==== Patterson vs. Liston I & II ====
Leading up to the fight, Liston was the major betting-line favorite, though Sports Illustrated predicted that Patterson would win in 15 rounds. Jim Braddock, Jersey Joe Walcott, Ezzard Charles, Rocky Marciano and Ingemar Johansson picked Patterson to win. The fight also carried a number of social implications. Liston's connections with the mob were well known and the NAACP was concerned about having to deal with Liston's visibility as World Champion and had encouraged Patterson not to fight Liston, fearing that a Liston victory would tarnish the civil rights movement. Patterson said John F. Kennedy also did not want him to fight Liston.

In David Remnick's book, King of the World, he calls Patterson a "sensitive" champion. Patterson was very open about his fears and feelings going into a fight, which was new behavior in the world of boxing. He was regarded as a very polite, well-mannered, and likeable champion. This contrasted the media's portrayal of Liston, whose mob ties and criminal history made it easy to paint as the villain of the fight. In the media, Patterson was painted as the good guy, and Liston was the antagonist. This rhetoric surrounded the fight, raising the stakes and putting pressure on Patterson to retain his title.

Patterson lost his title to Liston in Chicago on September 25, 1962, by a first-round knockout in front of 18,894 fans. The two fighters were a marked contrast. In the ring, Liston's size and power proved too much for Patterson's guile and agility. However, Patterson did not use his speed to his benefit. According to Sports Illustrated writer Gilbert Rogin, Patterson did not punch enough and frequently tried to clinch with Liston. Liston battered Patterson with body shots and then shortened up and connected with two double hooks high on the head. The result at the time was the third-fastest knockout in boxing history. After being knocked out, Patterson left Comiskey Park in Chicago wearing dark glasses and a fake beard for the drive back to New York. After the fight, questions were raised on whether the fight was fixed to set up a more lucrative rematch. Overnight, Patterson seemed to lose his public support as a result of his swift knockout. Despite the defeat, Patterson received $2 million, to be paid over 17 years.

The rematch was set for April 1963; however, Liston injured his knee swinging a golf club and the fight was delayed three months to July 22. It was the first million-dollar purse with both fighters receiving $1,434,000 each. In Las Vegas that night, Patterson attempted to become the first boxer to win the heavyweight title three times, but Liston once again knocked him out in the first round. Patterson lasted four seconds longer than in the first bout. The Liston fights were the only times Patterson was actually counted out in his 20-year professional career.

=== After the title ===
Following these defeats, Patterson went through a depression. However, he eventually recovered and began winning fights again, including top victories over Eddie Machen and George Chuvalo; the Chuvalo match won The Ring's "Fight of the Year" award.

==== Muhammad Ali ====
Patterson was now the number-one challenger for the title held by Muhammad Ali. On November 22, 1965, in Las Vegas, in yet another attempt to be the first to win the world heavyweight title three times, he went into the fight with an injured sacroiliac joint which worsened after the first round and greatly reduced his mobility in a bout in which Ali was clearly dominant. Ali called Patterson an "Uncle Tom" for refusing to call him Muhammad Ali (Patterson continued to call him Cassius Clay) and for his outspokenness against black Muslims. Before the match, Patterson had said:

"This fight is a crusade to reclaim the title from the Black Muslims. As a Catholic, I am fighting Clay as a patriotic duty. I am going to return the crown to America."

Ali hit Patterson repeatedly with jabs from the second round until the referee stopped the fight in the 12th round. In the post-fight interview, Ali praised Patterson for being able to take punches and said Patterson's age counted against him.

==== End of career ====
Patterson remained a legitimate contender. In 1966 he traveled to England and knocked out British boxer Henry Cooper in the fourth round at Wembley Stadium.

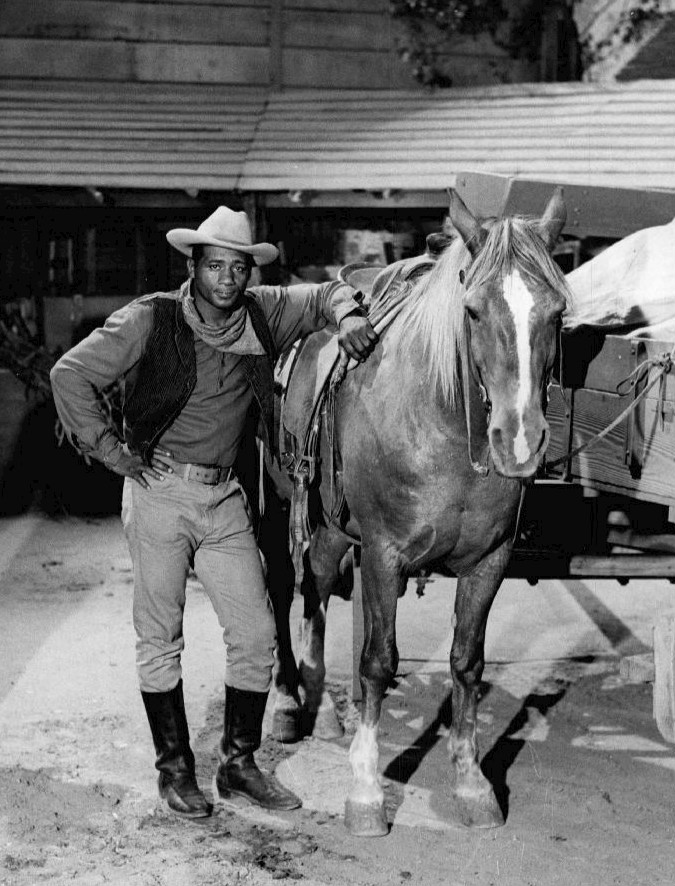
Patterson tried his hand at acting. He is seen in this 1968 The Wild Wild West episode as a landowner who is in danger of losing his property.

When Ali was stripped of his title for refusing induction into the military, the World Boxing Association staged an eight-man tournament to determine his successor. Patterson fought Jerry Quarry to a draw in 1967. In a rematch four months later, Patterson lost a controversial 12-round decision to Quarry. Subsequently, in a final attempt at winning the title a third time, Patterson lost a controversial 15-round referee's decision to Jimmy Ellis in Stockholm, in 1968, despite breaking Ellis's nose and scoring a disputed knockdown.

In September 1969 he divorced his first wife, Sandra Hicks Patterson, who wanted him to quit boxing, while he still had hopes for another title shot.

Patterson continued on, defeating Oscar Bonavena in a close fight over ten rounds in early 1972.

At age 37, Patterson was stopped after seven rounds with a cut eye while still competitive in a rematch with Muhammad Ali for the NABF heavyweight title on September 20, 1972. The defeat proved to be Patterson's last fight, although there was never an announcement of retirement.

== Retired life ==
In retirement, he and Ingemar Johansson became good friends who flew across the Atlantic to visit each other every year and he served two terms as chairman of the New York State Athletic Commission. He was also inducted into the International Boxing Hall of Fame in 1991.

Patterson lived in New Paltz, New York, for many years with his second wife, Janet Seaquist. They had two daughters, Jennifer and Janene. In 1982 and 1983 he ran the Stockholm Marathon together with Ingemar Johansson. He completed the 1983 New York City Marathon in 3:35:27.

His adopted son, Tracy Harris Patterson, was a world champion boxer in the 1990s and was trained by Floyd during part of his career. They are the first father and son to win world titles in boxing. Floyd also trained Canadian heavyweight Donovan "Razor" Ruddock in 1992 for his fights with Greg Page, Phil Jackson, and Lennox Lewis.

The New Paltz High School football field was named "Floyd Patterson Field" in 1985.

== Death ==
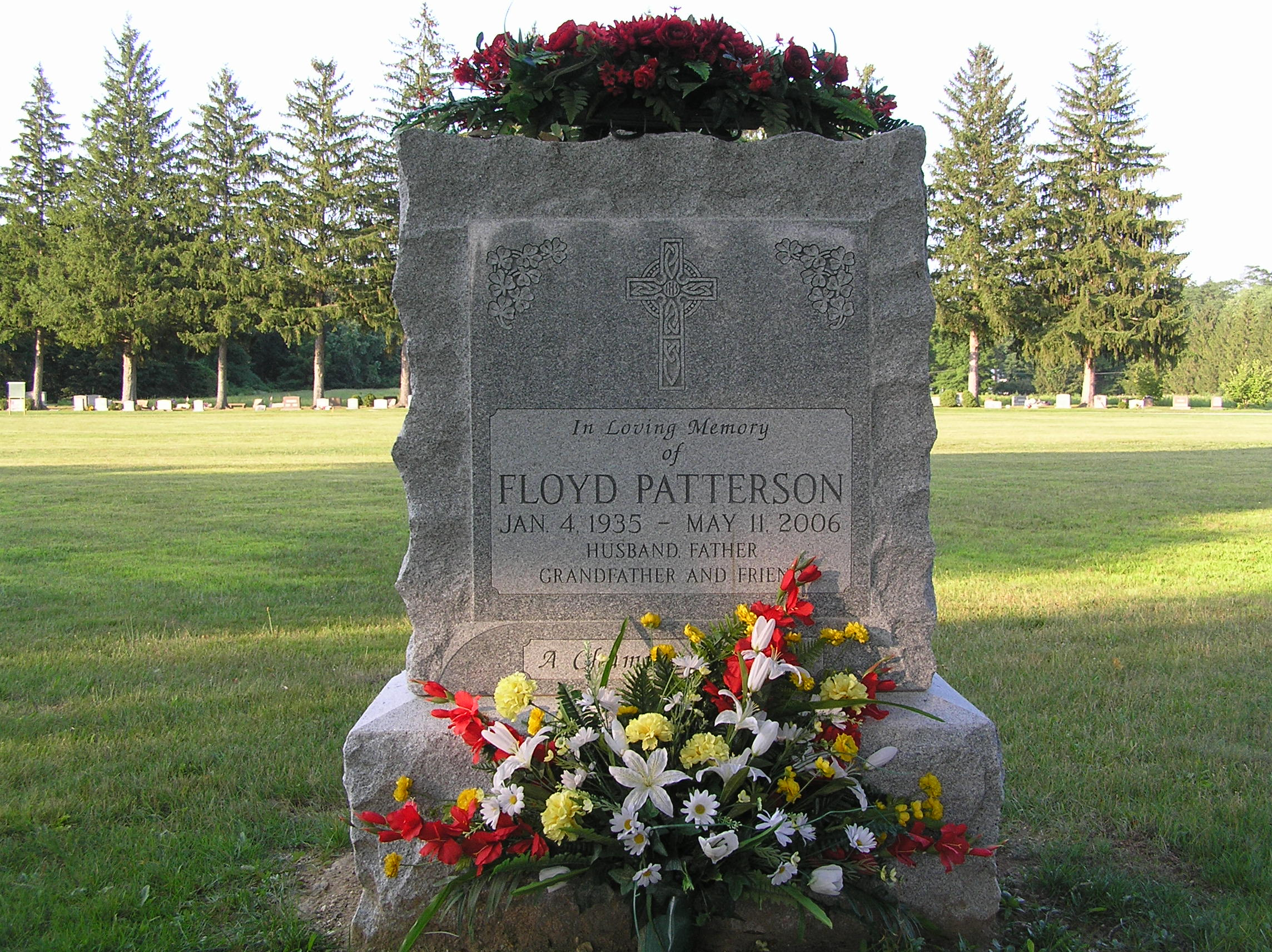
Floyd Patterson's grave

Patterson suffered from Alzheimer's disease (which although not known then, was probably related with chronic traumatic encephalopathy, which is related with many combat and contact sports participants) and prostate cancer in his final years. He died at home in New Paltz, on May 11, 2006, at the age of 71. His body was buried at New Paltz Rural Cemetery in New Paltz, Ulster County, New York.

== Quotes ==
- "It's easy to do anything in victory. It's in defeat that a man reveals himself."
- "They said I was the fighter who got knocked down the most, but I also got up the most." (This quote was used in the tenth episode of the 2009 TV series V.)
- "When you have millions of dollars, you have millions of friends."
- On boxing: "It's like being in love with a woman. She can be unfaithful, she can be mean, she can be cruel, but it doesn't matter. If you love her, you want her, even though she can do you all kinds of harm. It's the same with me and boxing. It can do me all kinds of harm but I love it."

== Professional boxing record ==
64 fights	55 wins	8 losses
By knockout	40	5
By decision	15	3
Draws	1	

No.	Result	Record	Opponent	Type	Round, time	Date	Age	Location	Notes
64	Loss	55–8–1	Muhammad Ali	RTD	7 (12), 3:00	Sep 20, 1972	37 years, 260 days	Madison Square Garden, New York City, New York, U.S.	For NABF heavyweight title
63	Win	55–7–1	Pedro Agosto	TKO	6 (10), 3:00	Jul 14, 1972	37 years, 192 days	Singer Bowl, New York City, New York, U.S.	
62	Win	54–7–1	Oscar Bonavena	UD	10	Feb 11, 1972	37 years, 38 days	Madison Square Garden, New York City, New York, U.S.	
61	Win	53–7–1	Charlie Harris	KO	6 (10), 2:31	Nov 23, 1971	36 years, 323 days	Multnomah County Exposition Center, Portland, Oregon, U.S.	
60	Win	52–7–1	Vic Brown	UD	10	Aug 21, 1971	36 years, 229 days	Peace Bridge Arena, Fort Erie, Ontario, Canada	
59	Win	51–7–1	Charley Polite	UD	10	Jul 17, 1971	36 years, 194 days	Erie Arena, Erie, Pennsylvania, U.S.	
58	Win	50–7–1	Terry Daniels	UD	10	May 26, 1971	36 years, 142 days	Cleveland Arena, Cleveland, Ohio, U.S.	
57	Win	49–7–1	Roger Russell	TKO	9 (10), 1:29	Mar 29, 1971	36 years, 84 days	Philadelphia Arena, Philadelphia, Pennsylvania, U.S.	
56	Win	48–7–1	Levi Forte	KO	2 (10), 2:20	Jan 16, 1971	36 years, 12 days	Convention Center, Miami Beach, Florida, U.S.	
55	Win	47–7–1	Charley Green	KO	10 (10), 1:15	Sep 15, 1970	35 years, 254 days	Madison Square Garden, New York City, New York, U.S.	
54	Loss	46–7–1	Jimmy Ellis	PTS	15	Sep 14, 1968	33 years, 254 days	Råsunda Stadium, Stockholm, Sweden	For WBA heavyweight title
53	Loss	46–6–1	Jerry Quarry	MD	12	Oct 28, 1967	32 years, 297 days	Grand Olympic Auditorium, Los Angeles, California, U.S.	
52	Draw	46–5–1	Jerry Quarry	MD	12	Jun 9, 1967	32 years, 156 days	Memorial Coliseum, Los Angeles, California, U.S.	
51	Win	46–5	Bill McMurray	KO	1 (10), 2:37	Mar 30, 1967	32 years, 85 days	Civic Arena, Pittsburgh, Pennsylvania, U.S.	
50	Win	45–5	Willie Johnson	KO	3 (10), 2:05	Feb 13, 1967	32 years, 40 days	Municipal Auditorium, Miami Beach, Florida, U.S.	
49	Win	44–5	Henry Cooper	KO	4 (10), 2:10	Sep 20, 1966	31 years, 259 days	Empire Pool, London, England	
48	Loss	43–5	Muhammad Ali	TKO	12 (15), 2:18	Nov 22, 1965	30 years, 322 days	Las Vegas Convention Center, Winchester, Nevada, U.S.	For WBC, NYSAC, and The Ring heavyweight titles
47	Win	43–4	Tod Herring	TKO	3 (10), 0:40	May 14, 1965	30 years, 130 days	Johanneshovs Isstadion, Stockholm, Sweden	
46	Win	42–4	George Chuvalo	UD	12	Feb 1, 1965	30 years, 28 days	Madison Square Garden, New York City, New York, U.S.	
45	Win	41–4	Charlie Powell	KO	6 (10), 1:21	Dec 12, 1964	29 years, 343 days	Hiram Bithorn Stadium, San Juan, Puerto Rico	
44	Win	40–4	Eddie Machen	PTS	12	Jul 5, 1964	29 years, 183 days	Råsunda Stadium, Stockholm, Sweden	
43	Win	39–4	Santo Amonti	TKO	8 (10), 2:25	Jan 6, 1964	29 years, 2 days	Stockholm, Sweden	
42	Loss	38–4	Sonny Liston	KO	1 (15), 2:10	Jul 22, 1963	28 years, 199 days	Las Vegas Convention Center, Winchester, Nevada, U.S.	For WBA, NYSAC, The Ring, and inaugural WBC heavyweight titles
41	Loss	38–3	Sonny Liston	KO	1 (15), 2:06	Sep 25, 1962	27 years, 264 days	Comiskey Park, Chicago, Illinois, U.S.	Lost WBA, NYSAC, and The Ring heavyweight titles
40	Win	38–2	Tom McNeeley	KO	4 (15), 2:51	Dec 4, 1961	26 years, 334 days	Maple Leaf Gardens, Toronto, Ontario, Canada	Retained NYSAC, NBA, and The Ring heavyweight titles
39	Win	37–2	Ingemar Johansson	KO	6 (15), 2:45	Mar 13, 1961	26 years, 68 days	Exhibition Hall, Miami Beach, Florida, U.S.	Retained NYSAC, NBA, and The Ring heavyweight titles
38	Win	36–2	Ingemar Johansson	KO	5 (15), 1:51	Jun 20, 1960	25 years, 168 days	Polo Grounds, New York City, New York, U.S.	Won NYSAC, NBA, and The Ring heavyweight titles
37	Loss	35–2	Ingemar Johansson	TKO	3 (15), 2:03	Jun 26, 1959	24 years, 173 days	Yankee Stadium, New York City, New York, U.S.	Lost NYSAC, NBA, and The Ring heavyweight titles
36	Win	35–1	Brian London	KO	11 (15), 0:51	May 1, 1959	24 years, 117 days	Fairgrounds Coliseum, Indianapolis, Indiana, U.S.	Retained NYSAC, NBA, and The Ring heavyweight titles
35	Win	34–1	Roy Harris	RTD	12 (15)	Aug 18, 1958	23 years, 226 days	Wrigley Field, Los Angeles, California, U.S.	Retained NYSAC, NBA, and The Ring heavyweight titles
34	Win	33–1	Pete Rademacher	KO	6 (15), 2:57	Aug 22, 1957	22 years, 230 days	Sick's Stadium, Seattle, Washington, U.S.	Retained NYSAC, and The Ring heavyweight titles
33	Win	32–1	Tommy Jackson	TKO	10 (15), 1:52	Jul 29, 1957	22 years, 206 days	Polo Grounds, New York City, New York, U.S.	Retained NYSAC, NBA, and The Ring heavyweight titles
32	Win	31–1	Archie Moore	KO	5 (15), 2:27	Nov 30, 1956	21 years, 331 days	Chicago Stadium, Chicago, Illinois, U.S.	Won vacant NYSAC, NBA, and The Ring heavyweight titles
31	Win	30–1	Tommy Jackson	SD	12	Jun 8, 1956	21 years, 156 days	Madison Square Garden, New York City, New York, U.S.	
30	Win	29–1	Alvin Williams	KO	3 (10), 1:58	Apr 10, 1956	21 years, 97 days	Memorial Hall, Kansas City, Missouri, U.S.	
29	Win	28–1	Jimmy Walls	TKO	2 (10), 2:29	Mar 12, 1956	21 years, 68 days	New Britain, Connecticut, U.S.	
28	Win	27–1	Jimmy Slade	TKO	7 (10), 2:05	Dec 8, 1955	20 years, 338 days	Grand Olympic Auditorium, Los Angeles, California, U.S.	
27	Win	26–1	Calvin Brad	KO	1 (10), 2:58	Oct 13, 1955	20 years, 282 days	Grand Olympic Auditorium, Los Angeles, California, U.S.	
26	Win	25–1	Dave Whitlock	KO	3 (10), 0:52	Sep 29, 1955	20 years, 268 days	Winterland Arena, San Francisco, California, U.S.	
25	Win	24–1	Alvin Williams	TKO	8 (10), 2:28	Sep 8, 1955	20 years, 247 days	Moncton, New Brunswick, Canada	
24	Win	23–1	Archie McBride	KO	7 (10), 1:46	Jul 6, 1955	20 years, 183 days	Madison Square Garden, New York City, New York, U.S.	
23	Win	22–1	Yvon Durelle	RTD	5 (10)	Jun 23, 1955	20 years, 170 days	Newcastle, New Brunswick, Canada	
22	Win	21–1	Esau Ferdinand	TKO	10 (10), 2:49	Mar 17, 1955	20 years, 72 days	Civic Auditorium, Oakland, California, U.S.	
21	Win	20–1	Don Grant	TKO	5 (10), 1:13	Jan 17, 1955	20 years, 13 days	Eastern Parkway Arena, New York City, New York, U.S.	
20	Win	19–1	Willie Troy	TKO	5 (8)	Jan 7, 1955	20 years, 3 days	Madison Square Garden, New York City, New York, U.S.	
19	Win	18–1	Jimmy Slade	UD	8	Nov 19, 1954	19 years, 319 days	Madison Square Garden, New York City, New York, U.S.	
18	Win	17–1	Joe Gannon	UD	8	Oct 22, 1954	19 years, 291 days	Madison Square Garden, New York City, New York, U.S.	
17	Win	16–1	Esau Ferdinand	UD	8	Oct 11, 1954	19 years, 280 days	St. Nicholas Arena, New York City, New York, U.S.	
16	Win	15–1	Tommy Harrison	TKO	1 (8), 1:29	Aug 2, 1954	19 years, 210 days	Eastern Parkway Arena, New York City, New York, U.S.	
15	Win	14–1	Jacques Royer Crecy	TKO	7 (8)	Jul 12, 1954	19 years, 189 days	St. Nicholas Arena, New York City, New York, U.S.	
14	Loss	13–1	Joey Maxim	UD	8	Jun 7, 1954	19 years, 154 days	Eastern Parkway Arena, New York City, New York, U.S.	
13	Win	13–0	Jesse Turner	UD	8	May 10, 1954	19 years, 126 days	Eastern Parkway Arena, New York City, New York, U.S.	
12	Win	12–0	Alvin Williams	UD	8	Apr 19, 1954	19 years, 105 days	Eastern Parkway Arena, New York City, New York, U.S.	
11	Win	11–0	Sammy Brown	TKO	2 (10), 1:40	Mar 30, 1954	19 years, 85 days	Turner's Arena, Washington, D.C., U.S.	
10	Win	10–0	Yvon Durelle	UD	8	Feb 15, 1954	19 years, 42 days	Eastern Parkway Arena, New York City, New York, U.S.	
9	Win	9–0	Dick Wagner	TKO	5 (8), 2:29	Dec 14, 1953	18 years, 344 days	Eastern Parkway Arena, New York City, New York, U.S.	
8	Win	8–0	Wes Bascom	UD	8	Oct 19, 1953	18 years, 288 days	Eastern Parkway Arena, New York City, New York, U.S.	
7	Win	7–0	Gordon Wallace	TKO	3 (8), 0:52	Jun 1, 1953	18 years, 148 days	Eastern Parkway Arena, New York City, New York, U.S.	
6	Win	6–0	Dick Wagner	SD	8	Apr 13, 1953	18 years, 99 days	Eastern Parkway Arena, New York City, New York, U.S.	
5	Win	5–0	Chester Mieszala	TKO	5 (6), 1:25	Jan 28, 1953	18 years, 24 days	Chicago Stadium, Chicago, Illinois, U.S.	
4	Win	4–0	Lalu Sabotin	TKO	5 (8), 1:30	Dec 29, 1952	17 years, 360 days	Eastern Parkway Arena, New York City, New York, U.S.	
3	Win	3–0	Lester Johnson	TKO	3 (6), 1:26	Oct 31, 1952	17 years, 301 days	Madison Square Garden, New York City, New York, U.S.	
2	Win	2–0	Sammy Walker	TKO	2 (6), 0:47	Oct 6, 1952	17 years, 276 days	Eastern Parkway Arena, New York City, New York, U.S.	
1	Win	1–0	Eddie Godbold	KO	4 (6), 1:39	Sep 12, 1952	17 years, 252 days	St. Nicholas Arena, New York City, New York, U.S.	

== Titles in boxing ==
=== Major world titles ===
- NYSAC heavyweight champion (200+ lbs) (2×)
- NBA (WBA) heavyweight champion (Note: At the end of his second reign on August 23, 1962, the NBA changes its name to the WBA, making Patterson the first WBA heavyweight champion and last NBA heavyweight champion.) (200+ lbs) (2×)

=== The Ring magazine titles ===
- The Ring heavyweight champion (200+ lbs) (2×)

=== Undisputed titles ===
- Undisputed heavyweight champion (2×)

== See also ==
- List of heavyweight boxing champions

== Notes and references ==
=== References ===
Sporting positions
Amateur boxing titles
Previous: Thomas Nelson	U.S. middleweight champion 1952	Next: Bryant Thompson
World boxing titles
Vacant Title last held by Rocky Marciano	NYSAC heavyweight champion November 30, 1956 – June 26, 1959	Succeeded by Ingemar Johansson
Vacant Title last held by Rocky Marciano	NBA heavyweight champion November 30, 1956 – June 26, 1959	Succeeded by Ingemar Johansson
Vacant Title last held by Rocky Marciano	The Ring heavyweight champion November 30, 1956 – June 26, 1959	Succeeded by Ingemar Johansson
Vacant Title last held by Rocky Marciano	Undisputed heavyweight champion November 30, 1956 – June 26, 1959	Succeeded by Ingemar Johansson
Preceded by Ingemar Johansson	NSYAC heavyweight champion June 20, 1960 – September 25, 1962	Succeeded by Sonny Liston
Preceded by Ingemar Johansson	WBA heavyweight champion June 20, 1960 – September 25, 1962	Succeeded by Sonny Liston
Preceded by Ingemar Johansson	The Ring heavyweight champion June 20, 1960 – September 25, 1962	Succeeded by Sonny Liston
Preceded by Ingemar Johansson	Undisputed heavyweight champion June 20, 1960 – September 25, 1962	Succeeded by Sonny Liston
Records
Previous: Joe Louis	Youngest world heavyweight champion November 30, 1956 – November 22, 1986	Next: Mike Tyson
