= David Remnick bibliography =

This is a list of works by David Remnick, American writer and editor of The New Yorker.

== Books ==
External videos
- Booknotes interview with Remnick on Lenin's Tomb, July 25, 1993, C-SPAN
- Presentation by Remnick on Resurrection: The Struggle for a New Russia, March 20, 1997, C-SPAN
- Interview with Remnick on Reporting: Writings from "The New Yorker", June 9, 2006, C-SPAN
- Interview with Remnick on The Bridge: The Life and Rise of Barack Obama, April 7, 2010, C-SPAN
- Interview with Remnick on The Bridge: The Life and Rise of Barack Obama at the 10th annual National Book Festival, September 25, 2010, C-SPAN
- Presentation by Remnick on The Bridge: The Life and Rise of Barack Obama at the 10th annual National Book Festival, September 25, 2010, C-SPAN

- Remnick, David (1993). Lenin's tomb : the last days of the Soviet Empire. New York: Random House.
- — (1996). The devil problem and other true stories. New York: Random House.
- — (1997). Resurrection : the struggle for a new Russia. New York: Random House.
- — (1998). King of the world : Muhammad Ali and the rise of an American hero. New York: Random House.
- —, ed. (2000). Life stories : profiles from The New Yorker. New York: Random House.
- —, ed. (2000). The new Gilded Age : The New Yorker looks at the culture of affluence. New York: Random House.
- Remnick, David & Susan Choi, eds. (2000). Wonderful town : New York Stories from The New Yorker. New York: Random House.
- Remnick, David & Henry Finder, eds. (2001). Fierce pajamas : an anthology of humor writing from The New Yorker. New York: Random House.
- Remnick, David, ed. (2006). Reporting : writings from The New Yorker. New York: Alfred A. Knopf.
- —, ed. (2007). Secret ingredients : The New Yorker book of food and drink. New York: Random House.
- Remnick, David & Henry Finder, eds. (2008). Disquiet, please! More humor writing from The New Yorker. New York: Random House.
- Remnick, David (2010). The bridge : the life and rise of Barack Obama. New York: Alfred A. Knopf.
- —, ed. (2010). The only game in town : sports stories from The New Yorker. New York: Random House.
- Remnick, David & Henry Finder, eds. (2020). The fragile earth : writing from The New Yorker on climate change. New York: Ecco.
- Cobb, Jelani & David Remnick, eds. (2021). The matter of Black lives : writing from The New Yorker. New York: Ecco.
- Remnick, David (2023). Holding the note : profiles in popular music. New York: Alfred A. Knopf.

== Essays and reporting ==
- Remnick, David (January 12, 2009). "Homelands". The Talk of the Town. Comment. The New Yorker. 84 (44): 17–18.
- — (September 28, 2009). "Blago speaks. Again". The Talk of the Town. The Blotter. The New Yorker. 85 (30): 22–23.
- — (November 14, 2011). "Decline and fall". The Talk of the Town. Comment. The New Yorker. 87 (36): 23–24. Republican Party Presidential candidates.
- — (December 19–26, 2011). "Letter from Moscow: The Civil Archipelago". The New Yorker. 87 (41): 94–109.
- — (January 16, 2012). "The state of the Union". The Critics. Books. The New Yorker. 87 (44): 64–69. Reviews Kantor, Jodi (2012). The Obamas. Little, Brown..
- — (November 19, 2012). "The Talk of the Town: Comment: No More Magical Thinking". The New Yorker. 88 (36): 25–26. Post-election challenges for President Obama.
- — (January 21, 2013). "The Party Faithful". The New Yorker.
- — (March 18, 2013). "Danse macabre : a scandal at the Bolshoi Ballet". Letter from Moscow. The New Yorker. 89 (5): 42–55.
- — (April 29, 2013). "The culprits". The Talk of the Town. Homeland. The New Yorker. 89 (11): 19–20. Boston Marathon bombing.
- — (November 4, 2013). "Glad to be unhappy". The Talk of the Town. In the Studio. The New Yorker. 89 (35): 40–41. WNYC-FM host Jonathan Schwartz.
- — (March 3, 2014). "Patriot games : Vladimir Putin lives his Olympic dream". Letter from Sochi. The New Yorker. 90 (2): 30–35.
- — (March 17, 2014). "Putin's pique". The Talk of the Town. Comment. The New Yorker. 90 (4): 19–20.
- — (August 4, 2014). "Aflame". The Talk of the Town. Comment. The New Yorker. 90 (22): 19–20.
- — (January 12, 2015). "The fire this time". The Talk of the Town. Comment. The New Yorker. 90 (43): 19–20.
- — (March 23, 2015). "Today's woman". The Talk of the Town. Comment. The New Yorker. 91 (5): 35–36.
- — (January 25, 2016). "Seeds of peace : Ayman Odeh's unlikely crusade". Letter from Jerusalem. The New Yorker. 91 (45): 24–30.
- — (February 1, 2016). "Friday night lights out". The Talk of the Town. Comment. The New Yorker. 91 (46): 15–16.
- — (June 20, 2016). "The choice". The Talk of the Town. Comment. The New Yorker. 92 (18): 21–22.
- — (June 20, 2016). "Unretiring". Showcase. The New Yorker. 92 (18): 46–47.
- — (July 25, 2016). "Michael Crawford". The Talk of the Town. Postscript. The New Yorker. 92 (22): 18.
- — (November 7, 2016). "New and improved : Goings on About Town gets a new look online". The New Yorker. 92 (36): 5.
- — (March 6, 2017). "Trump, Putin, and the New Cold War". Annals of Diplomacy. The New Yorker.
- — (March 20, 2017). "First as tragedy". The Talk of the Town. Comment. The New Yorker. 93 (5): 29–30.
- — (May 1, 2017). "One hundred days". The Talk of the Town. Comment. The New Yorker. 93 (11): 17–21.
- — (April 2, 2018). "Account settings". The Talk of the Town. Comment. The New Yorker. 94 (7): 23–24.
- — (July 27, 2020). "Redeeming America". The Talk of the Town. Comment. The New Yorker. 96 (21): 11.
- — (January 18, 2021). "The final days". The Talk of the Town. Comment. The New Yorker. 96 (44): 11–12.
- — (March 29, 2021). "When he was good : a life of Philip Roth". The Critics. Books. The New Yorker. 97 (6): 62–69.
- — (September 5, 2022). "Nobel gesture". The Talk of the Town. Comment. The New Yorker. 98 (27): 11–12.
- — (September 12, 2022). "First and last". The Talk of the Town. Comment. The New Yorker. 98 (28): 13–14.
- — (February 13–20, 2023). "Defiance : despite a near–fatal stabbing—and decades of death threats—Salman Rushdie won't stop telling stories". Profiles. The New Yorker. 99 (1): 50–61.
- — (January 14, 2024). "Hostages : as Benjamin Netanyahu clings to power, his country pays a price". The New Yorker. 99 (46): 26–39.
- — (May 20, 2024). "The pages of war". The Talk of the Town. Comment. The New Yorker. 100 (13): 15–16.
