= Ingemar Johansson vs. Floyd Patterson II =

Boxing match

The Fight
- Date: June 20, 1960
- Venue: Polo Grounds, New York City, New York, U.S.
- Title(s) on the line: NBA, NYSAC, and The Ring undisputed heavyweight championship

Tale of the tape
Boxer	Ingemar Johansson	Floyd Patterson
Nickname	"Ingo"	"The Gentleman of Boxing"
Hometown	Gothenburg, Västra Götaland, Sweden	Waco, North Carolina, U.S.
Purse	$593,107	$771,232
Pre-fight record	22–0 (14 KO)	35–2 (25 KO)
Age	27 years, 8 months	25 years, 5 months
Height	6 ft 0 in (183 cm)	6 ft 0 in (183 cm)
Weight	194 3/4 lb (88 kg)	190 lb (86 kg)
Style	Orthodox	Orthodox
Recognition	NBA, NYSAC and The Ring undisputed Heavyweight Champion	NBA; No. 2 Ranked Heavyweight; The Ring; No. 3 Ranked Heavyweight; Former undisputed heavyweight champion

Result
- Patterson defeats Johansson by 5th round KO

Ingemar Johansson vs. Floyd Patterson II, billed as The Fight, was a professional boxing match contested on June 20, 1960, for the undisputed heavyweight championship.

== Background ==
Following Ingemar Johansson's upset of Floyd Patterson in June 1959 to win the world heavyweight championship, a rematch was due to be held within 90 days however that fight's promoter Bill Rosensohn and his company "Rosensohn Enterprises" had their licences' suspended by NYSAC, which put pay to those plans. On 25 August the two camps agreed to a rematch set to take place "between March 1 and June 15" 1960, a deal in part brokered by former champion Jack Dempsey. Initially, it appeared that the ongoings legal issues would prevent the rematch from remaining in New York, however a group of New York promoters (Feature Sports Inc.) headed by veteran promoter Jack Fugazy and attorney Roy Cohn agreed a deal in December to stage the fight at the Polo Grounds, New York, in June 1960.

Former champion Joe Louis, who had been critical of Patterson and his manager Cus D'Amato in the aftermath the first bout, joined Patterson's training camp in Newtown, Connecticut during the build up, commented that "I think Floyd has a much better chance in this fight then in the first. He won't be tricked into getting hit by that right hand so easy. He will be looking for it more." When asked about the champion's confidence Louis replied "I think Patterson's confidence will come back as he trains he said. "In fact, he probably has it right now." Patterson, for his part, blamed his underestmating of Johansson for his loss saying "I underrated Ingo. I believed what I read about him not showing any punch in training sessions. But things will be different this time."

The bout was to be the first home Pay-per-view cable television broadcast in history, with 25,000 TelePrompTer subscribers mailing in $2 to watch the rematch. Chris Schenkel was the host/commentator, with Marty Glickman commenting on the corners in between rounds.

The champion Johansson was an 7½–5 betting favourite to retain the title.

Patterson was attempting to become the first man in history to successfully regain to the heavyweight title, 8 previous champions had unsuccessfully tried: James J. Corbett (1900 & 1903), Bob Fitzsimmons (1902), James J. Jeffries (1910), Jack Dempsey (1927), Max Schmeling (1938), Joe Louis (1950), Ezzard Charles (1952, June 1954, September 1954) and Jersey Joe Walcott (1953)

The crowd of 31,892 included New York Governor Nelson Rockefeller, former Governor Thomas Dewey, actor James Cagney as well former heavyweight champions Jack Dempsey and Gene Tunney.

== The fight ==
In the first round, Johansson suffered a slight cut under his left eye, as Patterson (who had weighed in at a career high 190 lb) attempted to beat the champion to the punch with his jab, working inside in order to dig both hands to the body. Early in the second Johansson landed a big right hand to the jaw of Patterson but this time the former champion was able to withstand the Hammer of Thor. As the rounds progressed the cut above the eye of Johansson worsen.

After almost a minute of the fifth round a leaping left hook to the jaw from Patterson dropped Johansson for the first time in his career. The champion beat the count and Patterson proceeded to launch a furious furry of shots to the body, looking to land another big shot. With just over half the round left to go, a second leaping left hook to the chin sent Johansson down to the canvas with a thud, landing flat on his back. Out cold, the Swede was counted out by referee Arthur Mercante Sr. (working in his first world championship bout) at 1:51 of the fifth round.

After the count, Patterson showed his concern for Johansson by cradling his motionless opponent, and promising him a second rematch. Johansson lay flat on his back on the canvas for five minutes before he was placed on a stool brought into the ring. He was still dazed and unsteady fifteen minutes after the knockout as he was helped out of the ring. With the victory Patterson had become the first man in history to recover the undisputed heavyweight championship. At the time of the stoppage Paterson led on all three official cards 3–1.

== Aftermath ==
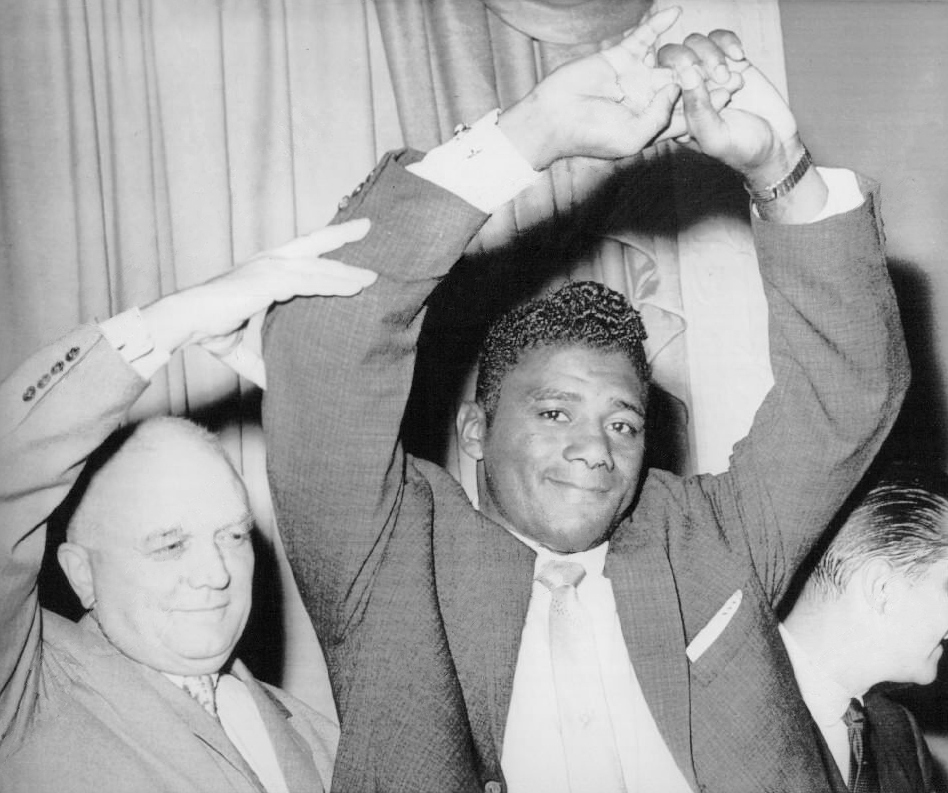
Cus D'Amato (left) and Floyd Patterson (right), the day after the bout

Speaking after the bout, Patterson told the press "For the first time I feel I'm a real champion. I think the public finally will accept me. At least, I hope so." Of the punch that knocked out Johansson, he said "I think it was the hardest blow I ever hit anyone, It had to be. I put everything behind it and I weighed more tonight than I ever did for any other fight. It was worth losing the title for this. This is easily the most gratifying moment of my life. I never for a moment thought of losing but to win it this way is just perfect. I can't tell you how happy I am. I'm the champ again. A real champ this time. Do you know what that means? I'm going to be a real champion". He would also say that he promised to the unconscious Johansson that he would give him a rematch.

Speaking to reporters the following morning Johansson said "Patterson was fresher and stronger this time, he caught me with a good punch and that was that. Maybe next time it will be different." When asked why he was unable make of most of the one big right he landed, during the second round, he replied "I had planned a long fight and I thought he was playing. Even though I might have had him, I didn't like to take a chance. I felt I had time and I was confident I would be able to get him again. Also, I thought he would fight himself out."

Despite both men expressing eagerness for a third bout the president of the NBA, Anthony Maceroni, expressed opposition saying "It was a good bout, honest and sincere and a decisive victory for Patterson. The heavyweight division has been stalled long enough. We believe that there are many challengers available in that division." Both No. 1 ranked Sonny Liston and No. 5 ranked Eddie Machen were mentioned as possible challengers.

The bout attracted 500,000 PPV buys, generating revenue of $3,000,000 ($31,890,000 adjusted for inflation).

== Undercard ==
Confirmed bouts:

== Broadcasting ==
Country	Broadcaster
United Kingdom	BBC

Preceded by First match	Ingemar Johansson's bouts 20 June 1960	Succeeded by Third match
Preceded by First match	Floyd Patterson's bouts 20 June 1960	Succeeded by Third match
Awards
Preceded by Gene Fullmer vs. Carmen Basilio	The Ring Fight of the Year; 1960	Succeeded by Joe Brown vs. Dave Charnley II
Preceded by Floyd Patterson vs. Ingemar Johansson; Round 3	The Ring Round of the Year; Round 5; 1960	Succeeded by Floyd Patterson vs. Ingemar Johansson III; Round 1
