= Floyd Patterson vs. Ingemar Johansson =

Boxing match

- Date: June 26, 1959
- Venue: Yankee Stadium, New York City, New York, U.S.
- Title(s) on the line: NBA, NYSAC, and The Ring undisputed heavyweight championship

Tale of the tape
Boxer	Floyd Patterson	Ingemar Johansson
Nickname	"The Gentleman of Boxing"	"Ingo"
Hometown	Waco, North Carolina, U.S.	Gothenburg, Västra Götaland, Sweden
Purse	$300,000	$100,000
Pre-fight record	35–1 (25 KO)	21–0 (13 KO)
Age	24 years, 5 months	26 years, 9 months
Height	6 ft 0 in (183 cm)	6 ft 0 in (183 cm)
Weight	182 lb (83 kg)	196 lb (89 kg)
Style	Orthodox	Orthodox
Recognition	NBA, NYSAC and The Ring undisputed Heavyweight Champion	NBA/The Ring; No. 1 Ranked Heavyweight

Result
- Johansson defeats Patterson by 3rd round KO

Floyd Patterson vs. Ingemar Johansson was a professional boxing match contested on June 26, 1959, for the undisputed heavyweight championship.

== Background ==
By the end of 1958, heavyweight champion Floyd Patterson had made three defences of the undisputed heavyweight title he had won in November 1956 following the retirement of Rocky Marciano, he had however faced criticism that his manager Cus D'Amato had failed match him against any top ranked opponents (indeed one, Pete Rademacher was making his professional debut) and that D'Amato's conflict with the International Boxing Club of New York was hurting his career.

In September 1958, a month after Patterson's return from a year long layoff, unbeaten former European champion Ingemar Johansson knocked out top ranked Eddie Machen to become the number one ranked contender. Following this win there were months of negotiations between the two camps. These were complicated by Machen's attempts to force a rematch with Johansson and the three way scramble between Colorado Springs, Colorado, Los Angeles, California and New York City, New York for the rights to host the bout.

On 5 February 1959 Patterson and Johansson signed to face each other "somewhere in the United States before September 30." Patterson also agreed to face Brian London in a tune up bout beforehand. On 11 March, promoter Bill Rosensohn confirmed that the bout would be held on 23 June in New York at either Yankee Stadium or Polo Grounds, later confirmed as Yankee Stadium. When asked about the location Johansson said "I am quite satisfied with the decision," before adding "I am willing to box everywhere even if Bill had staged this match in Greenland, For me the main point is that Floyd and I are in the same ring."

On 1 May Patterson successfully defeated London, knocking out the Brit in the 11th round.

Speaking during the build up to the bout, the champion said "I am eager for this fight as I was for the Archie Moore fight the night I won the title. I never have seen Johansson fight. I don't care whether he used the right in training or not. For all I know his best punch. How soon it will end depends upon Johansson. If he lets me, I will end it early. If he doesn't, he might even end it early. I am sharper than I was before the London fight." The challenger expressed confidence saying "I will win by points, if I don't stop Patterson. I'm strong enough to endure anything Floyd gives me. He won't and can't wear me down. I never plan in advance. When I face my opponent, I can tell in a few moments just how I should fight."

Johansson was a 5–1 underdog entering the ring.

The bout was pushed back to 26 June due to bad weather.

== The fight ==
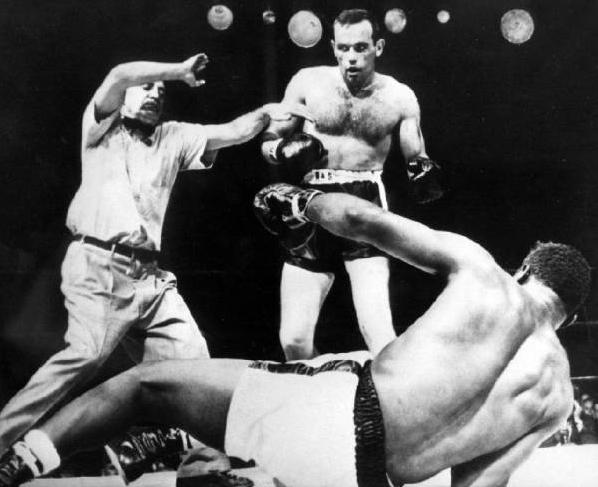
Johansson knocks out Patterson

Johansson spent the first two rounds of the encounter retreating and flicking a light left jab at the champion. In the third round, Johansson threw a wide left hook that Patterson blocked with his right hand. When he moved his right hand away from its protective peek-a-boo position before his chin, Johansson drilled him with a short powerful right hand. Patterson went down, arose on unsteady legs and was out on his feet. Johansson followed up his advantage and sent Patterson down six more times in the round before the bout was stopped by referee Ruby Goldstein.

Johansson became the first European to hold the heavyweight title since Primo Carnera lost the title to Max Baer in 1934.

== Aftermath ==
Speaking after the bout the new champion said "I told them all I knew my right hand (would do it), and now Floyd Patterson knows it." Patterson, when asked whether he had ever been hit harder than by Johansson replied "Evidently not."

Former champion Joe Louis commented in the aftermath "Floyd Patterson has all the tools to be a great champion, but he hasn't learned a thing since he turned pro, and it's all Cus D'Amato's fault. Patterson looked confused and didn't know what to do. You can blame his lack of fights against good fighters for that."

The contract called for a rematch within 90 days however the fight's promoter Bill Rosensohn and his company "Rosensohn Enterprises" had their licences' suspended by NYSAC.

On 25 August the two camps agreed to a rematch set to take place "between March 1 and June 15" 1960, a deal in part brokered by former champion Jack Dempsey.

This was the last major heavyweight title bout won by a European boxer until 1993, when Lennox Lewis defeated Tony Tucker and the last by a non American until Gerrie Coetzee in 1983.

== Undercard ==
Confirmed bouts:

== Broadcasting ==
Country	Broadcaster
United Kingdom	BBC

Preceded by vs. Brian London	Floyd Patterson's bouts 26 June 1959	Succeeded by Rematch
Preceded by vs. Eddie Machen	Ingemar Johansson's bouts 26 June 1959	Succeeded by Rematch
Awards
Preceded by Eddie Machen vs. Ingemar Johansson; Round 1	The Ring Round of the Year; Round 3; 1959	Succeeded by Ingemar Johansson vs. Floyd Patterson II; Round 5
