= Waco, North Carolina =

- Town
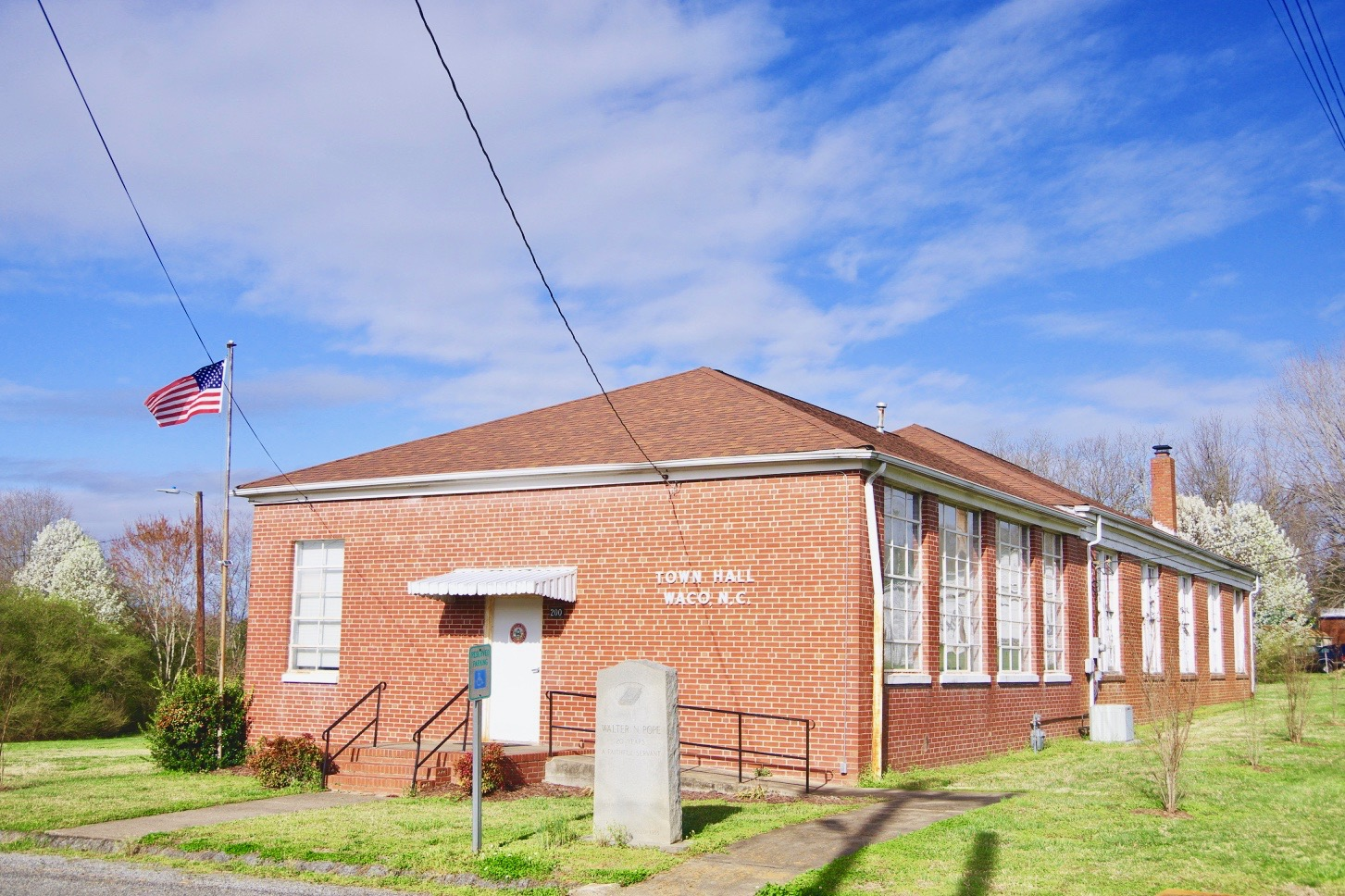
- Town Hall

- Seal

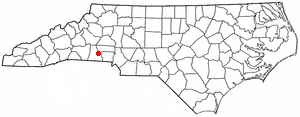
- Location of Waco, North Carolina
- Coordinates: 35°21′44″N 81°25′44″W
- Country: United States
- State: North Carolina
- County: Cleveland

Area
  - Total: 0.84 sq mi (2.18 km^{2})
  - Land: 0.84 sq mi (2.17 km^{2})
  - Water: 0.0039 sq mi (0.01 km^{2})
- Elevation: 932 ft (284 m)

Population (2020)
  - Total: 310
  - Density: 370.1/sq mi (142.88/km^{2})
- Time zone: UTC-5 (Eastern (EST))
  - Summer (DST): UTC-4 (EDT)
- ZIP code: 28169
- Area code: 704
- FIPS code: 37-70320
- GNIS feature ID: 2406810
- Website: www.townofwaco.com

Waco is a town in Cleveland County, North Carolina, United States. As of the 2020 census, Waco had a population of 310. The town was named after Waco, Texas, and a post office has been in operation since 1880.

== History ==
A post office called Waco has been in operation since 1880. The town was named after Waco, Texas.

== Geography ==
According to the United States Census Bureau, the town has a total area of 0.8 square miles (2.1 km^{2}), all land.

== Demographics ==
Historical population
Census	Pop.	Note	%±
1890	105		—
1900	160		52.4%
1910	185		15.6%
1920	189		2.2%
1930	176		−6.9%
1940	281		59.7%
1950	310		10.3%
1960	256		−17.4%
1970	245		−4.3%
1980	322		31.4%
1990	320		−0.6%
2000	328		2.5%
2010	321		−2.1%
2020	310		−3.4%
U.S. Decennial Census

As of the census of 2000, there were 328 people, 134 households, and 92 families residing in the town. The population density was 408.2 inhabitants per square mile (157.6/km^{2}). There were 145 housing units at an average density of 180.5 per square mile (69.7/km^{2}). The racial makeup of the town was 80.49% White, 18.29% African American, 0.30% Native American, 0.30% Pacific Islander, and 0.61% from two or more races.

There were 134 households, out of which 23.1% had children under the age of 18 living with them, 55.2% were married couples living together, 9.7% had a female householder with no husband present, and 31.3% were non-families. 26.1% of all households were made up of individuals, and 6.7% had someone living alone who was 65 years of age or older. The average household size was 2.45 and the average family size was 2.91.

In the town, the population was spread out, with 21.0% under the age of 18, 8.8% from 18 to 24, 29.9% from 25 to 44, 26.2% from 45 to 64, and 14.0% who were 65 years of age or older. The median age was 39 years. For every 100 females, there were 105.0 males. For every 100 females age 18 and over, there were 103.9 males.

The median income for a household in the town was $32,031, and the median income for a family was $38,750. Males had a median income of $27,083 versus $21,250 for females. The per capita income for the town was $20,081. About 9.1% of families and 8.3% of the population were below the poverty line, including 9.4% of those under age 18 and none of those age 65 or over.

== Notable person ==
Floyd Patterson, heavyweight boxing champion
