= Ingemar Johansson =

Swedish boxer (1932–2009)

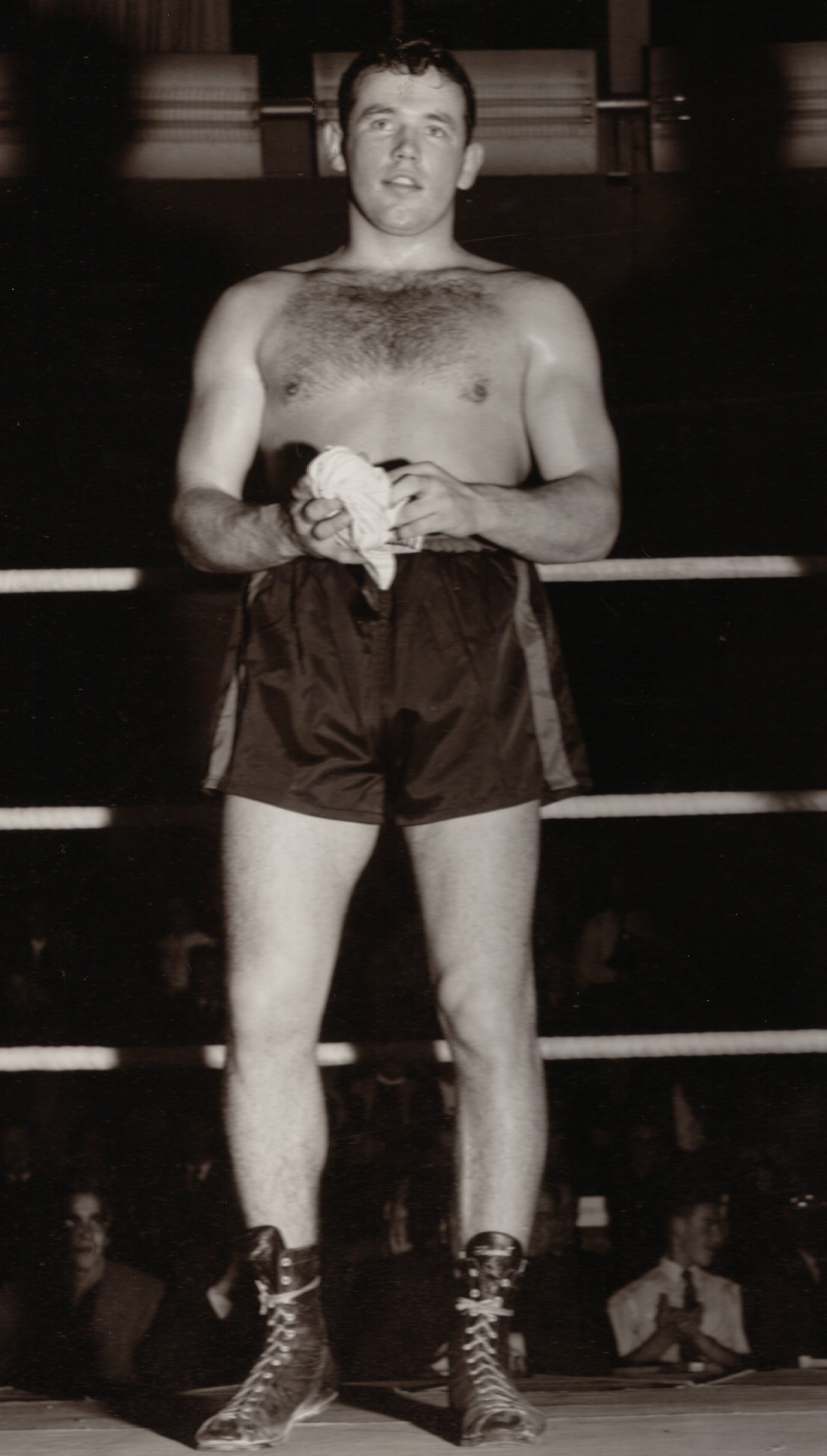

Personal information
- Nicknames: Ingo; The Hammer of Thor
- Born: Jens Ingemar Johansson; 22 September 1932 Gothenburg, Sweden
- Died: 30 January 2009 (aged 76) Kungsbacka, Sweden
- Height: 183 cm (6 ft 0 in)
- Weight: Heavyweight

Boxing career
- Reach: 178 cm (70 in)
- Stance: Orthodox

Boxing record
- Total fights: 28
- Wins: 26
- Win by KO: 17
- Losses: 2
Medal record
Men's amateur boxing
Representing Sweden
Olympic Games
Silver medal – second place	1952 Helsinki	Heavyweight

Jens Ingemar "Ingo" Johansson (Note: According to the Swedish Tax Agency, Johansson was registered as Jens Ingmar Johansson.) (Swedish: [ˈɪ̌ŋː(ɛ)mar ˈjûːanˌsɔn]; 22 September 1932 – 30 January 2009) was a Swedish professional boxer who competed from 1952 to 1963. He held the world heavyweight title from 1959 to 1960 and was the fifth heavyweight champion born outside the United States. Johansson won the title by defeating Floyd Patterson via third-round stoppage, after flooring him seven times in that round. For this achievement, Johansson was awarded the Hickok Belt as top professional athlete of the year—the only non-American in its entire 27-year first run—and was named the Associated Press Male Athlete of the Year and Sports Illustrated Sportsman of the Year.

Johansson also held the EBU European Heavyweight Champion title twice, from 1956 to 1958 and from 1962 to 1963. As an amateur he won a silver medal in the heavyweight division at the 1952 Summer Olympics. He affectionately named his right fist "toonder and lightning" for its concussive power (it was also called "Ingo's bingo" and the "Hammer of Thor"), and in 2003 he was ranked at No. 99 on The Ring magazine's list of the 100 greatest punchers of all time.

== Professional career ==
=== Early years ===
At age nineteen Johansson was disqualified for passivity at the Helsinki 1952 Summer Olympics in the heavyweight competition in a fight against eventual Olympic gold medalist Ed Sanders. His silver medal was withheld for poor performance and presented to him only in 1982.

Johansson had earned his spot in the Olympics by winning the Swedish National Championship earlier the same year, 1952, after he knocked out his opponent in the first round of the final.

After the Olympics Johansson went into seclusion for six months and considered quitting boxing. However, he returned to the ring and turned professional under the guidance of the Swedish publisher and boxing promoter Edwin Ahlquist, subsequently winning his first 21 professional fights. He won the Scandinavian pro title by knocking down and outscoring the Dane Erik Jensen (breaking his right hand in the process). A broken hand and a one-year military service kept him out of the ring until late 1954. In August 1955, in his twelfth professional fight, Johansson knocked out former European Heavyweight Champion Hein ten Hoff in the first round. He took the Scandinavian heavyweight title in 1953 and, on 30 September 1956, he won the European Heavyweight title by scoring a 13th-round KO over Italy's Franco Cavicchi in Milan.

Johansson successfully defended his European crown against ranked heavyweights Henry Cooper (fifth-round KO on 19 May 1957) and Joe Erskine, with a TKO in round 13 on 21 February 1958.

=== World heavyweight champion ===
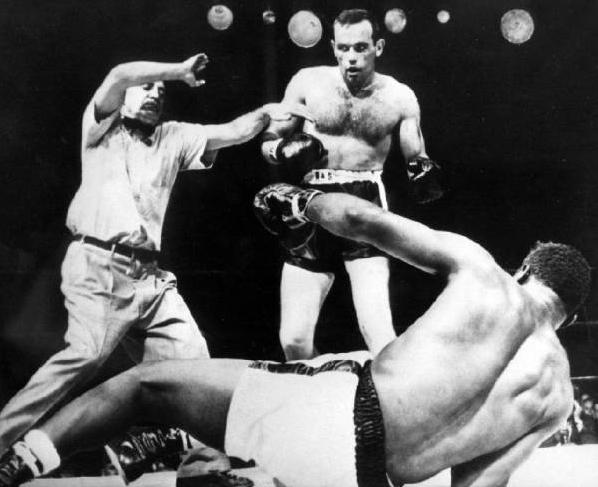
Johansson knocks out Floyd Patterson to become world heavyweight champion, 1959.

Johansson earned his shot at the world heavyweight crown when he knocked out top ranked contender Eddie Machen in the first round of their elimination match on 14 September 1958. In front of 53,615 fans in Ullevi football stadium, Johansson downed Machen three times, finally finishing him with a barrage of punches at 2:16 of the first round. Johansson then signed to fight champion Floyd Patterson.

Johansson was a colourful figure in New York City as he trained for the fight. Eschewing the monastic training regimen favored by Patterson and other fighters, Johansson trained at the Catskill resort of Grossingers. He did not seem to train particularly hard, and was often seen at night spots with his attractive girlfriend, Elaine Sloane, whom he asked out while she was working for Sports Illustrated.

He entered the ring in Yankee Stadium on 26 June 1959, as a 5–1 underdog. Johansson spent the first two rounds of the encounter retreating and flicking a light left jab at the champion. In the third round, Johansson threw a wide left hook that Patterson blocked with his right hand. When he moved his right hand away from its protective peek-a-boo position before his chin, Johansson drilled him with a short powerful right hand. Patterson went down, arose on unsteady legs and was out on his feet. Johansson followed up his advantage and sent Patterson down six more times in the round before the bout was stopped by referee Ruby Goldstein. Johansson celebrated with his girlfriend and future wife Birgit Lundgren and the next day a headline in a New York newspaper expressed the city's amazement. It read: "Ingo – It's Bingo." When Johansson returned to Sweden, he flew in on a helicopter, landing in the main football stadium in Gothenburg, his home town, and was cheered by 20,000 people. He appeared on the cover of Sports Illustrated, as well as the cover of Life magazine on 20 July 1959, alongside Birgit.

Johansson was a flamboyant champion – a precursor to the "Swinging Sixties". One publication dubbed Johansson "boxing's Cary Grant" and in 1960 he appeared in the movie All the Young Men as a marine, alongside stars Alan Ladd and Sidney Poitier. Wherever he went, in the U.S. or in Sweden, he had a beautiful woman on his arm, with paparazzi snapping pictures.

At that point, retired heavyweight champion Rocky Marciano, who sat ringside and witnessed as Johansson knocked out Patterson, considered a possible comeback for a championship bout versus Johansson. He entered a training camp, keeping it low profile, but dropped the idea because he could not get into the condition he previously had, feeling he was too old for a title fight.

=== Rematch with Patterson ===
Johansson proposed to his girlfriend Birgit in April 1960 after the champion visited Egypt. Then he turned his attention to defending his title against Floyd Patterson. The two signed for a rematch on 20 June 1960. Patterson knocked Johansson out in the fifth round with a leaping left hook to become the first man to recover the world's undisputed heavyweight title. The punch caught Johansson's chin and he hit the canvas with a thud, out cold before he landed flat on his back. With blood trickling from his mouth, his glazed eyes staring up at the ring lights, and his left foot twitching, the Swede was counted out. After the count, Patterson showed his concern for Johansson by cradling his motionless opponent, and promising him a second rematch. Johansson lay flat on his back on the canvas for five minutes before he was placed on a stool brought into the ring. He was still dazed and unsteady fifteen minutes after the knockout as he was helped out of the ring.

=== Third match with Patterson ===
Patterson and Johansson fought their final match on 13 March 1961. Johansson appeared to be in the worst physical condition of his three bouts with Patterson. A. J. Liebling, writing in The New Yorker, said the outcome seemed preordained and that Johansson was not dieting for the fight, eating creamed chicken, strawberry shortcake, and cherry cheesecake. Nonetheless, the fight was competitive. Johansson caught Patterson leaping at him in the very first round and knocked him down. He followed his advantage up by scoring another knockdown, but was himself caught going in wide open by that famous Patterson left hook, resulting in a knockdown. As the fight progressed, it became obvious that Johansson was spent. Patterson won when the referee swiftly stopped the contest in round six after Johansson had been knocked down once again.

=== Later career and retirement ===
Johansson, then only 29, returned to Europe. He recaptured the European crown from Dick Richardson by an eight-round KO on 17 June 1962. By this time, Sonny Liston had captured the heavyweight crown from Patterson, and efforts were underway to match Johansson with Liston.

Johansson, however, fought journeyman heavyweight Brian London on 21 April 1963, in a non-title 12-round match. Johansson won most of the rounds but seldom threw a serious right-hand punch with the exception of round seven when a short right from Johansson staggered London (Las Vegas Sun, April 22, 1963, p. 24). In round 12, with four seconds remaining in the fight, London hit Johansson with a powerful right hand that knocked him on his back. Johansson arose at the count of four, just as the bell rang to end the fight. Johansson was groggy, but was the points winner. UPI scored the fight 11–1 in favour of Johansson (Las Vegas Sun, April 22, 1963, p. 24).

The next day, the front page of Stockholm's newspapers showed a photo of him dizzy, climbing the ropes, with the headline "Wake up Ingo – You won!" After seeing this, he wrote a letter to the European Boxing Union resigning his title and retiring from boxing at the age of 30.

== Life after boxing ==
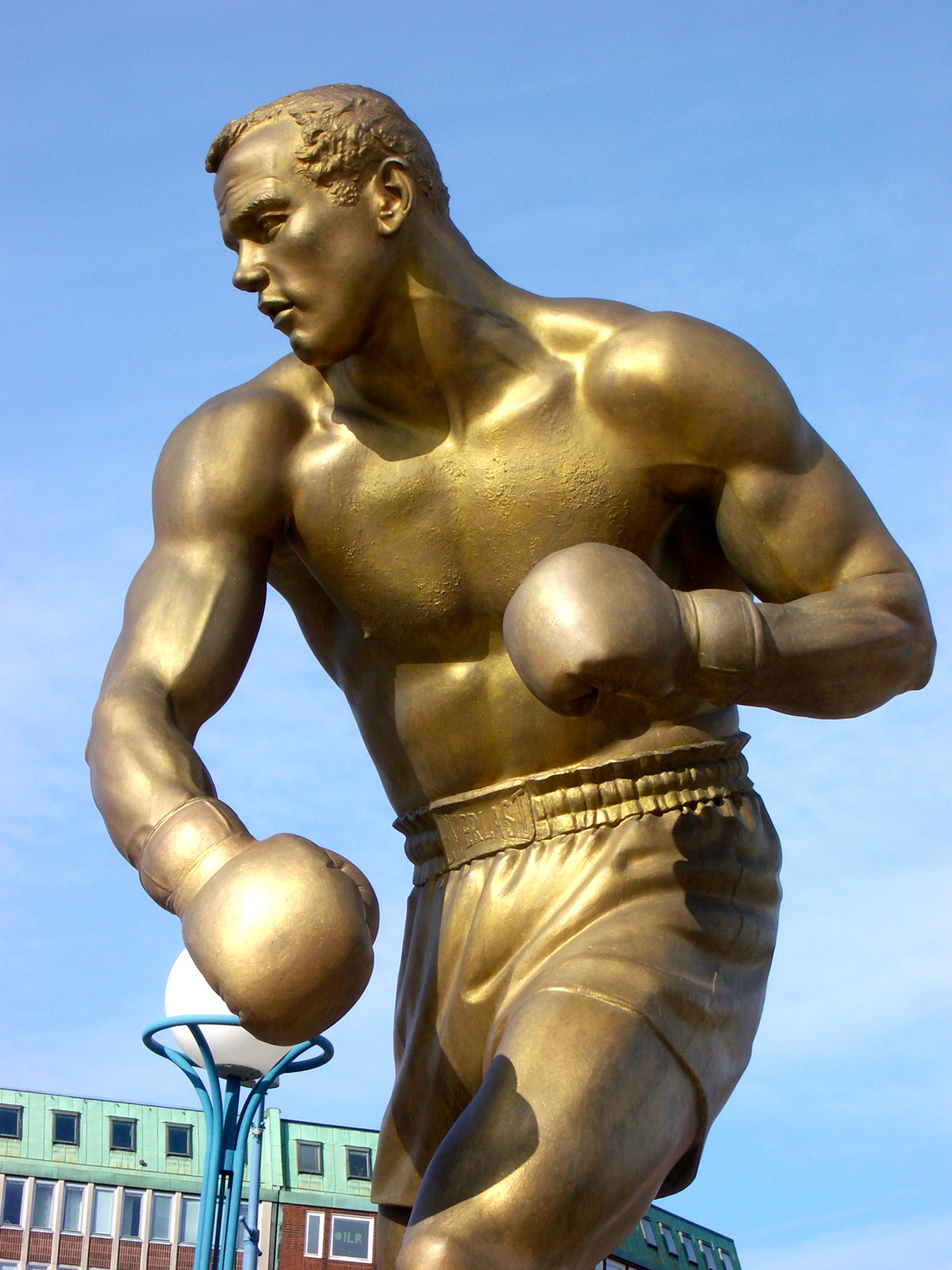
"Ingo the Champ", Peter Linde's bronze statue of Johansson, was unveiled in his home town Gothenburg in 2011, outside the Ullevi stadium where he won a fight in 1958 against Eddie Machen.

Ingemar Johansson and Floyd Patterson became good friends who flew across the Atlantic to visit each other every year.

Johansson made several films in Sweden and appeared as a marine in the Korean War film All the Young Men (1960). In the 1960s along with other business interests, Johansson co-promoted boxing cards in Sweden, including several with ex-champ Sonny Liston (1966 and 1967). On 22 April 1966, he boxed a five-round exhibition with European Heavyweight Champion Karl Mildenberger for his first co-promotion. He also owned a fishing boat and a bar called "Ingo's".

By the 1970s, he resided in Pompano Beach, Florida, where he owned a hotel. He ran in marathons (including the New York City Marathon and Boston Marathon) all over the world until the mid-1980s. In 1985 he completed the Stockholm Marathon.

During the 1990s, Johansson and Patterson would attend boxing conventions and also sign their autographs on boxing memorabilia. They continued to be friends until the onset of Alzheimer's disease incapacitated them both. It is believed now that both suffered from chronic traumatic encephalopathy (CTE), as it has been discovered in many contact and combat sports athletes, including boxing, although his career was fairly short compared with some champions. In the 1990s Johansson's business interests in Sweden included sports apparel and a light lager beer called "Hammer", named for his punching prowess.

In 2000, the Swedish Sports Academy selected Johansson as Sweden's third-best athlete of the 20th century, behind tennis great Björn Borg and Alpine skiing great Ingemar Stenmark. In 2002, he was inducted to the International Boxing Hall of Fame.

Having suffered from Alzheimer's disease and dementia since the mid-1990s, he lived in a nursing home in Kungsbacka while his health deteriorated. In the later stages of his illness, he was reunited with his second wife, Birgit, who was at his side when he died on 30 January 2009, from complications following pneumonia. At the time of his death, he was at age 76 the oldest living heavyweight champion. Johansson was married three times and is survived by five children.

In January 2011, the 1959 Johnny Lion song "Ingemar Johansson", which chronicles the 1959 Patterson fight, was re-released on the compilation album From The Vault: The Coed Records Lost Master Tapes, Volume 1.

== Legacy ==
Johansson's world title victory is still historically significant within European boxing, as he became only the fourth-ever European to become heavyweight champion and the first since Primo Carnera in 1933. Johansson would be the last European to win the heavyweight title until Italy's Francesco Damiani became the inaugural WBO heavyweight champion in May 1989. As the WBO was a fledgling sanctioning body at the time and not considered a legitimate world title, it was not until Great Britain's Lennox Lewis was awarded the WBC title in 1992, 33 years after Johansson's victory over Patterson, that a European again held a recognised version of the heavyweight title. It was also not until 1999, when Lewis unified the titles against Evander Holyfield, that a European again held the undisputed heavyweight championship, as Johansson had 40 years earlier. Johansson was also the last non-American to hold the heavyweight title until South Africa's Gerrie Coetzee won the WBA version in 1983.

Despite never successfully defending the title, Johansson was heavyweight champion in two decades (the 1950s and 1960s). He was the first heavyweight champion to lose the title to the man whom he had beaten to become champion since Ezzard Charles's loss to Jersey Joe Walcott in 1951. As his losses to Patterson are his only defeats, Johansson is one of four heavyweight champions to have retired with victories over every opponent he faced as a professional. Although the win over Patterson is his most famous, Johansson's first-round victory over the undefeated American, Eddie Machen, in 1958 is also noteworthy and provides evidence of the power the Swede held in his right hand. Machen would go on to take Sonny Liston the twelve-round distance in 1960 and lasted into the tenth round against Joe Frazier in 1966.

Johansson also held the European Boxing Union Heavyweight title on two occasions, scoring stoppage victories over notable foes such as Henry Cooper, Dick Richardson and Joe Erskine.

== Professional boxing record ==
28 fights	26 wins	2 losses
By knockout	17	2
By decision	8	0
By disqualification	1	0

No.	Result	Record	Opponent	Type	Round, time	Date	Location	Notes
28	Win	26–2	Brian London	PTS	12	21 Apr 1963	Johanneshovs Isstadion, Stockholm, Sweden	
27	Win	25–2	Dick Richardson	KO	8 (15), 2:13	17 Jun 1962	Ullevi, Gothenburg, Sweden	Won European heavyweight title
26	Win	24–2	Wim Snoek	KO	5 (10), 1:15	15 Apr 1962	Kungliga tennishallen, Stockholm, Sweden	
25	Win	23–2	Joe Bygraves	TKO	7 (12), 2:08	9 Feb 1962	Exhibition and Congress Centre, Gothenburg, Sweden	
24	Loss	22–2	Floyd Patterson	KO	6 (15), 2:45	13 Mar 1961	Exhibition Hall, Miami Beach, Florida, U.S.	For NYSAC, NBA, and The Ring heavyweight titles
23	Loss	22–1	Floyd Patterson	KO	5 (15), 1:51	20 Jun 1960	Polo Grounds, New York City, New York, U.S.	Lost NYSAC, NBA, and The Ring heavyweight titles
22	Win	22–0	Floyd Patterson	TKO	3 (15), 2:03	26 Jun 1959	Yankee Stadium, New York City, U.S.	Won NYSAC, NBA, and The Ring heavyweight titles
21	Win	21–0	Eddie Machen	KO	1 (12), 2:16	14 Sep 1958	Ullevi, Gothenburg, Sweden	
20	Win	20–0	Heinz Neuhaus	TKO	4 (12), 2:56	13 Jul 1958	Ullevi, Gothenburg, Sweden	
19	Win	19–0	Joe Erskine	TKO	13 (15)	21 Feb 1958	Exhibition and Congress Centre, Gothenburg, Sweden	Retained European heavyweight title
18	Win	18–0	Archie McBride	PTS	10	13 Dec 1957	Exhibition and Congress Centre, Gothenburg, Sweden	
17	Win	17–0	Henry Cooper	KO	5 (15), 2:57	19 May 1957	Råsunda Stadium, Stockholm, Sweden	Retained European heavyweight title
16	Win	16–0	Peter Bates	KO	2 (10), 1:45	28 Dec 1956	Exhibition and Congress Centre, Gothenburg, Sweden	
15	Win	15–0	Franco Cavicchi	KO	13 (15), 1:16	30 Sep 1956	PalaDozza, Bologna, Italy	Won European heavyweight title
14	Win	14–0	Hans Friedrich	PTS	10	15 Apr 1956	Kungliga tennishallen, Stockholm, Sweden	
13	Win	13–0	Joe Bygraves	PTS	8	24 Feb 1956	Exhibition and Congress Centre, Gothenburg, Sweden	
12	Win	12–0	Hein ten Hoff	KO	1 (8), 1:00	28 Aug 1955	Ullevi, Gothenburg, Sweden	
11	Win	11–0	Günter Nurnberg	KO	7 (8)	12 Jun 1955	Westfalenhalle, Dortmund, Germany	
10	Win	10–0	Uber Bacilieri	UD	8	3 Apr 1955	Kungliga tennishallen, Stockholm, Sweden	
9	Win	9–0	Aldo Pellegrini	DQ	5 (8)	4 Mar 1955	Exhibition and Congress Centre, Gothenburg, Sweden	Pellegrini disqualified for repeated low blows
8	Win	8–0	Kurt Schiegl	TKO	5 (8), 2:28	13 Feb 1955	Kungliga tennishallen, Stockholm, Sweden	
7	Win	7–0	Ansell Adams	PTS	8	6 Jan 1955	Exhibition and Congress Centre, Gothenburg, Sweden	
6	Win	6–0	Werner Wiegand	TKO	5 (8), 2:45	5 Nov 1954	Exhibition and Congress Centre, Gothenburg, Sweden	
5	Win	5–0	Raymond Degl'lnnocenti	KO	2 (6)	3 Dec 1953	Exhibition and Congress Centre, Gothenburg, Sweden	
4	Win	4–0	Erik Jensen	PTS	6	12 Mar 1953	K.B. Hallen, Copenhagen, Denmark	Won vacant Scandinavian heavyweight title
3	Win	3–0	Lloyd Barnett	PTS	8	6 Mar 1953	Exhibition and Congress Centre, Gothenburg, Sweden	
2	Win	2–0	Emile Bentz	KO	2 (6), 0:32	6 Feb 1953	Exhibition and Congress Centre, Gothenburg, Sweden	
1	Win	1–0	Robert Masson	KO	4 (8), 1:30	5 Dec 1952	Exhibition and Congress Centre, Gothenburg, Sweden	

== Exhibition boxing record ==
1 fight	0 wins	0 losses
Non-scored	1	

No.	Result	Record	Opponent	Type	Round, time	Date	Location	Notes
1	—N/a	0–0 (1)	Muhammad Ali	—N/a	3	Feb 6, 1961	Miami Beach, Florida, U.S.	Non-scored bout

== Titles in boxing ==
=== Major world titles ===
- NYSAC heavyweight champion (200+ lbs)
- NBA (WBA) heavyweight champion (200+ lbs)

=== The Ring magazine titles ===
- The Ring heavyweight champion (200+ lbs)

=== Regional/International titles ===
- Scandinavian heavyweight champion (200+ lbs)
- European heavyweight champion (200+ lbs) (2×)

=== Undisputed titles ===
- Undisputed heavyweight champion

== See also ==
- List of heavyweight boxing champions

== Notes ==
Sporting positions
Regional boxing titles
Preceded by Franco Cavicchi	European heavyweight champion 30 September 1956 – July 1958; Vacated	Vacant Title next held by Dick Richardson
Preceded by Dick Richardson	European heavyweight champion 17 June 1962 – 1963; Vacated	Vacant Title next held by Henry Cooper
World boxing titles
Preceded by Floyd Patterson	NYSAC heavyweight champion 26 June 1959 – 20 June 1960	Succeeded by Floyd Patterson
Preceded by Floyd Patterson	NBA heavyweight champion 26 June 1959 – 20 June 1960	Succeeded by Floyd Patterson
Preceded by Floyd Patterson	The Ring heavyweight champion 26 June 1959 – 20 June 1960	Succeeded by Floyd Patterson
Preceded by Floyd Patterson	Undisputed heavyweight champion 26 June 1959 – 20 June 1960	Succeeded by Floyd Patterson
