= Ezzard Charles vs. Joe Louis =

Boxing match

- Date: September 27, 1950
- Venue: Yankee Stadium, New York City, New York, U.S.
- Title(s) on the line: NBA, NYSAC, and The Ring undisputed heavyweight championship

Tale of the tape
Boxer	Ezzard Charles	Joe Louis
Nickname	"The Cincinnati Cobra"	"The Brown Bomber"
Hometown	Cincinnati, Ohio, U.S.	Detroit, Michigan, U.S.
Purse	$57,405	$100,458
Pre-fight record	66–5–1 (39 KO)	58–1 (49 KO)
Age	29 years, 2 months	36 years, 4 months
Height	6 ft 0 in (183 cm)	6 ft 1 1/2 in (187 cm)
Weight	184 1/2 lb (84 kg)	218 lb (99 kg)
Style	Orthodox	Orthodox
Recognition	NBA; Heavyweight Champion; The Ring; No. 1 Ranked Heavyweight	Lineal; Heavyweight Champion; NBA; No. 1 Ranked Heavyweight; Former undisputed heavyweight champion

Result
- Charles defeats Louis by unanimous decision

Ezzard Charles vs. Joe Louis was a professional boxing match contested on September 27, 1950, for the undisputed heavyweight championship.

== Background ==
After making a record 25 consecutive defences of the heavyweight title, Joe Louis announced his retirement from boxing on March 1, 1949. The NBA immediately sanctioned a bout between top contenders Jersey Joe Walcott and Ezzard Charles for its vacant title. Charles would defeat Walcott on points to win the title, however many organizations including NYSAC and The Ring did not recognize him as the heavyweight champion.

By May 1950, the IRS completed an audit of Louis's past tax returns and announced that, the former champion still owed government more than $500,000. After striking a deal to come out of retirement to pay back the IRS, on August 18 Louis signed to face Charles at Yankee Stadium on September 27.

Speaking en route to his training camp in Pompton Lakes, New Jersey, Louis told reporters "I think I'm better now than at any time since the war". Of the champion he said "He may not look good but he's definitely a good fighter and he punches pretty fair."

Louis, a 2 to 1 betting favourite in the lead up to the bout was backed by among others fellow former champion Gene Tunney who said "Joe will knock him out in five rounds. If Jack Dempsey is not the greatest fighter who ever lived, then Joe Louis is".

== The fight ==
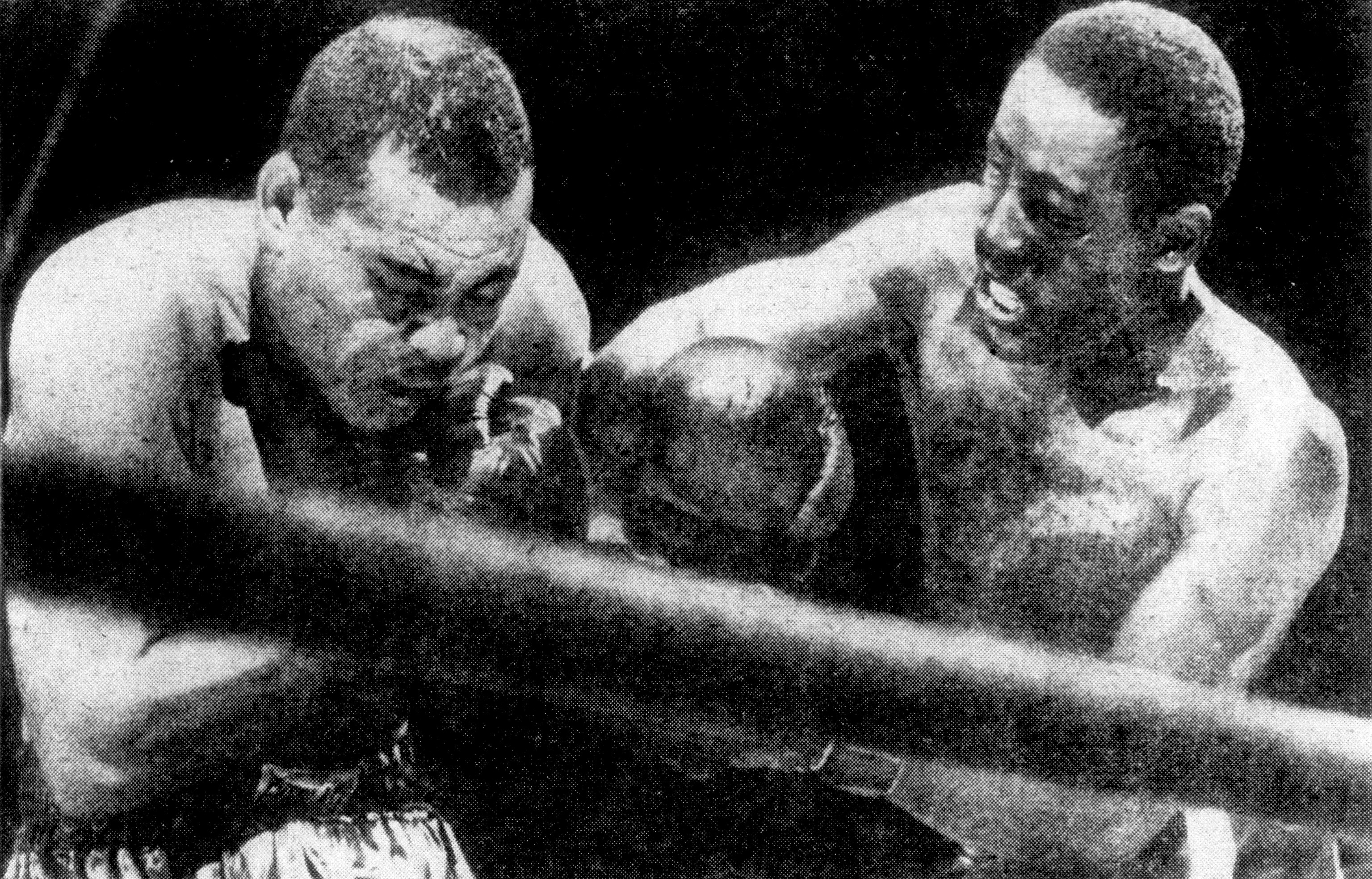
Louis (left) ducks a right hook thrown by Charles (right)

In front of a crowd of 22,357 Charles dominated Louis. The much younger Charles exposed the eroded reflexed of the former champion outlanding and outboxing him. Louis kept stalking the champion but apart brief moments in the 4th and 12th rounds, failed to hurt the champion.

The bout lasted the full 15 rounds and Charles was awarded a unanimous decision victory with scores of 10–5, 12–3 and 13–2. The Associated Press scored it 12–2–1 for Charles. This was Louis' first loss for over 14 years since his first bout with Max Schmeling in 1936 and it marked his only loss in a world title bout.

== Aftermath ==
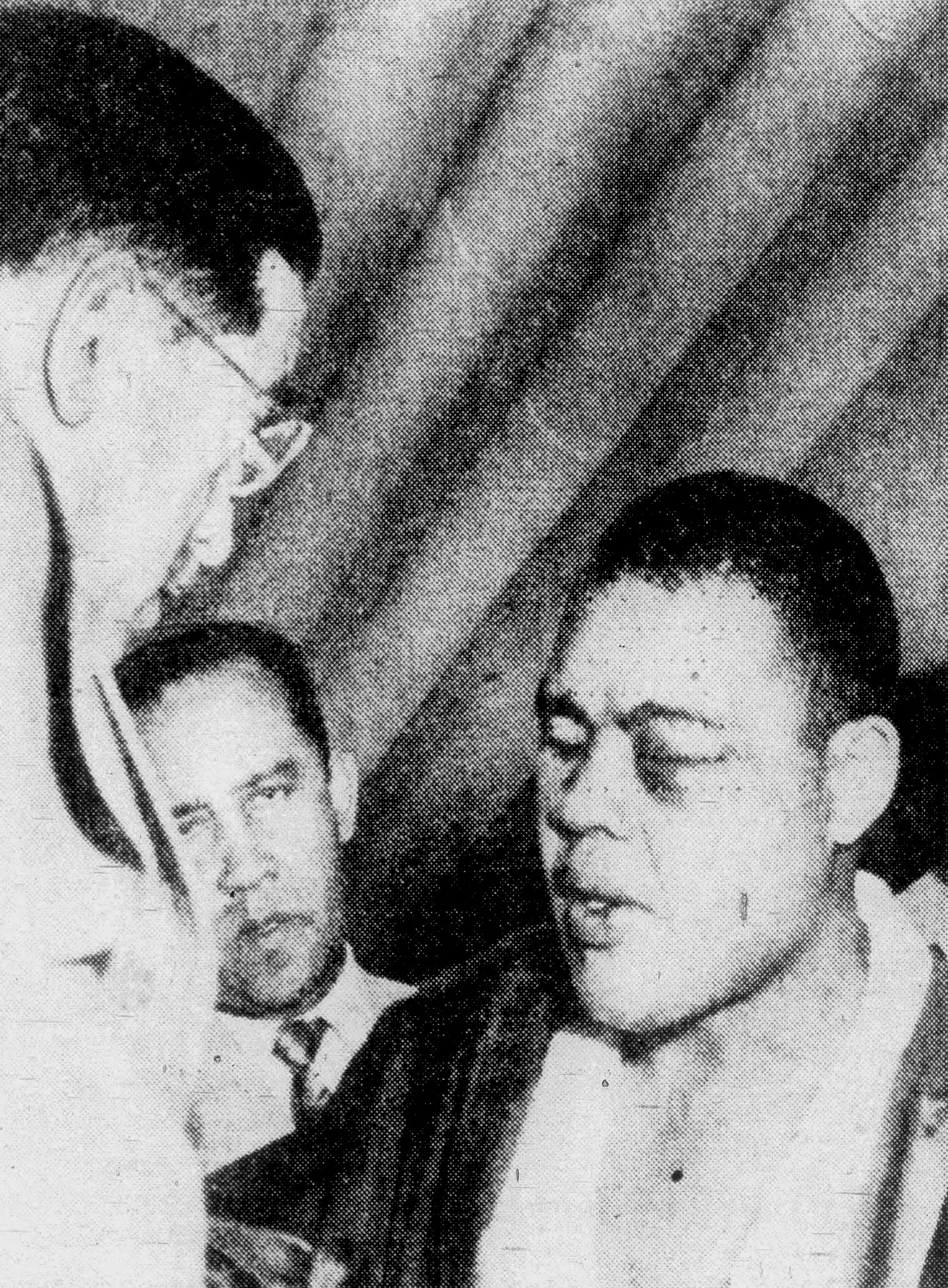
Louis (right) being examined by Dr. Vincent Nardiello (left) following the bout

Speaking after the bout Charles' manager Jake Mintz said "We'll fight anybody, but we'll have to have the champion's end. We came up the hard way, and always have taken the shore end. Now we're champ, and anybody who fights us must take the challenger's end. That goes for Lee Savold, too. We don't recognize no European world champion. I planned the fight. Did you see me in Louis' corner giving signals across the ring between rounds? We had a code work- ed out. At the end of the 13th round when I saw we had the fight won, I went around to Ezzard's corner and told him to coast.." In his dressing room Louis told the press that he was done with boxing saying "I'm through, I won't fight again. I done the best I can."

Now recognized as the undisputed champion, Charles would next have a homecoming bout in Cincinnati against Nick Barone. Unfortunately Louis' share of the purse was not enough to settle his debt so he was forced to return to the ring, winning 8 times in the following 12 months before a one sided loss to contender Rocky Marciano in October 1951 ended his career.

== Undercard ==
Confirmed bouts:

== Broadcasting ==
Country	Broadcaster
United States	CBS

Preceded by vs. Freddie Beshore	Ezzard Charles's bouts 27 September 1950	Succeeded by vs. Nick Barone
Preceded by vs. Jersey Joe Walcott II	Joe Louis's bouts 27 September 1950	Succeeded by vs. Cesar Brion
