= Zion Hensley =

American amateur boxer (born 2009)

Personal information
- Born: Zion Hensley; September 25, 2009 (age 17) Youngstown, Ohio, USA

Boxing career
- Weight class: Flyweight; Bantamweight
- Stance: Orthodox

Boxing record
- Wins: 60
- Win by KO: 11
- Losses: 15
Medal record
Women's youth amateur boxing
National Junior Olympics
Gold medal – first place	2021 Junior Olympics
Silver medal – second place	2024 Junior Olympics
USA Boxing
Gold medal – first place	2021 National championships
Silver medal – second place	2022 National championships
Gold medal – first place	2023 Female gold medalist
Silver medal – second place	2023 National championships
Gold medal – first place	2024 Female open gold medalist
Gold medal – first place	2024 National Open championships
Gold medal – first place	2024 National championships
International Open
Silver medal – second place	2025 USA Boxing International Open
Silver medal – second place	2026 USA Boxing Junior Olympics
The Golden Girl Swedish Boxing Federation 2026 Top Tournament Talent Award
Canadian Budo Canada International Tournament
Gold medal – first place	2025 gold medalist
Queretaro, Cadereyta Semi Desert International
Gold medal – first place	2025 gold medalist
Gold medal – first place	2026 gold medalist
Pittsburgh International Irish
Gold medal – first place	2025 gold medalist
Gold medal – first place	2026 National open
Gold medal – first place	2026 National Golden Gloves

Zion Hensley (born September 25, 2009) is an American amateur boxer. She gained national and international recognition as a multiple-time USA Boxing national champion. She has been trained by several coaches within her young career, including former world champion Kelly Pavlik and Darnell Boone.

== Personal life ==
Zion Hensley was born on September 25, 2009, in Youngstown, Ohio. She attends Cardinal Mooney High School, where she competes in track and field.

== Amateur boxing career ==
Hensley began her amateur career at the age of 9. She has trained under former world champion Kelly Pavlik at his gym Ghost Boxing in Youngstown, Ohio. Hensley has also worked with strength and conditioning coaches in the Youngstown-area athletic community. She was associated with Youngstown-Salem Boxing Club earlier in her career.

Hensley has racked up several awards within her amateur career, including six USA Boxing national championships, and a gold medal in the 2021 USA Junior Olympics. In early 2025, she was ranked 71st in the world in the bantamweight division and 46th in the world in the flyweight division.

During the 2021 USA Junior Olympics, Hensley defeated Eva Knight in the first round via unanimous decision, defeated Marina Avalos in the second round via TKO, and took home a gold medal with a win against Zaydi Cabagua in the finals in July 2021. A few months later, in December 2021, Hensley defeated Mia Garcia, the 2nd ranked youth female boxer in the U.S. at the time, via unanimous decision, to win the 90lb USA Boxing national championship.

During the 2022 USA Boxing national championships, Hensley earned a silver medal, falling to Guadalupe Ruiz.

In 2023, Hensley competed in the 2023 USA Boxing National Qualifier, earning gold and becoming the first three-time national champion from the Mahoning Valley. She competed in the 2024 USA Boxing national championships, defeating Jazmine Gutierrez-Garcia via split decision, earning her 5th national championship,. She competed in the USA Boxing Junior Nationals the same year, defeating Marley Guerra via unanimous decision, earning her 6th and most recent championship.

Hensley competed in the 2025 USA Boxing national championships, where she was defeated by Sophia Martinez via unanimous decision. Hensley later won two bouts in the Reinas del Semidesierto in Cadereyta de Montes, Mexico in October 2025.

In early 2026, Hensley faced several nationally ranked opponents in the Golden Glove Tune Up in Cleveland, Ohio, including 5th-ranked Nieva Pinedo from San Bernardino Valley, California. She defeated Pinedo via unanimous decision. In January 2026, Hensley competed in the 2026 The Golden Girl Championships in Boras, Sweden, and lost via unanimous decision to Tilly Haynes. Hensley competed against 7th-ranked Hazel Franko from Houston, Texas in May 2026 on Fight to Unite 12, a boxing event based in Youngstown, Ohio. She defeated Franko via unanimous decision.

Hensley is the 2nd-ranked amateur youth boxer in the United States as of June 2026, defeating Gianna Umbriaco, and 3rd-ranked Nayra Oceguera via decision, before being defeated by 1st-ranked Ruby Lopez in the 2026 USA Boxing Junior Olympics and Summer Festival. 9 days later Hensley competed in the National Jr. Golden Gloves of America beating Emaleigh Hernandez of Dallas Texas and Olympic Style Weight lifter and decorated Amateur Karma Farber Kyeong earning her 7th National title. She won her 8th National title at the Cleveland National Open with USA boxing.
