= List of United States national amateur boxing welterweight champions =

Below is a list of National Amateur Boxing Welterweight Champions, also known as United States Amateur Champions, along with the state or region which they represented. The United States National Boxing Championships bestow the title of United States Amateur Champion on amateur boxers for winning the annual national amateur boxing tournament organized by USA Boxing, the national governing body for Olympic boxing and since 2023 is the United States' member organisation of World Boxing after leaving the Association Internationale de Boxe (AIBA) as a result of corruption scandals. It is one of four premier amateur boxing tournaments, the others being the National Golden Gloves Tournament, which crowns its own amateur welterweight champion, the Police Athletic League Tournament, and the United States Armed Forces Tournament, all sending champions to the US Olympic Trials. It was contested at 147lbs until 2002 when it was changed to 152lbs.

- 1897 - A. McIntosh, New York, New York
- 1898 - A. McIntosh, New York, New York
- 1899 - Percey McIntyre, New York, New York
- 1900 - J.J. Dukelow, New York, New York
- 1901 - J.J. Dukelow, New York, New York
- 1902 - Charles McCann, Philadelphia, Pennsylvania
- 1903 - John Leavy, New York, New York
- 1904 - C.T. Mitchell, Waltham, Massachusetts
- 1905 - H.L. McKinnon, Boston, Massachusetts
- 1906 - William McDonald, San Francisco, California
- 1907 - W.J. Kirkland, St. Phillip's
- 1908 - William Rolfe, Boston, Massachusetts
- 1909 - M.J. McNamara, Cambridge, Massachusetts
- 1910 - Hillard Long, Toronto, ON, Canada
- 1911 - John Fisher, New York, New York
- 1912 - Charles Askins, Boston, Massachusetts
- 1913 - Charles Askins, Boston, Massachusetts
- 1914 - W. Woldman, Cleveland, Ohio
- 1915 - Augie Ratner, New York, New York
- 1916 - Eugene Brosseau, Montreal, Quebec, Canada
- 1917 - Daniel O'Connor, Dorchester, New York
- 1918 - James Sullivan, New York, New York
- 1919 - Dave Rosenberg, New York, New York
- 1920 - J. Schroendorf, Milwaukee, Wisconsin
- 1921 - Charles Jennkissen, Los Angeles, California
- 1922 - Harry Simons, Gary, Indiana
- 1923 - John Rinl, Cleveland, Ohio
- 1924 - Al Mello, Lowella, Massachusetts
- 1925 - Bernard Barde, Dartmouth College
- 1926 - Edward Tiernan, New York, New York
- 1927 - Tommy Lown, New York, New York
- 1928 - Tommy Lown, New York, New York
- 1929 - Leslie Baker, Watertown, Massachusetts
- 1930 - Charles Kelly, Newton, Massachusetts
- 1931 - Edward Flynn, New Orleans, Louisiana
- 1932 - Edward Flynn, New Orleans, Louisiana
- 1933 - W. Celebron, Chicago, Illinois
- 1934 - Danny Farrar, Youngstown, Ohio
- 1935 - Jimmy Clark, Buffalo, New York
- 1936 - Leo Sweeney, Pittsburgh, Pennsylvania
- 1937 - Johnny Marquez, San Francisco, California
- 1938 - James O'Malley, Chicago, Illinois
- 1939 - Cozy Storace, Rome, New York
- 1940 - Henry Brimm, Buffalo, New York
- 1941 - Dave Andrews, Lowell, Massachusetts
- 1942 - Willard Buckless, Saugas, Massachusetts
- 1943 - C. Cooper, Washington, D.C.
- 1944 - Joe Gannon, Washington, D.C.
- 1945 - Abe Lee, Chicago, Illinois
- 1946 - Robert Takeshita, Hawaii
- 1947 - Jackie Keough, Cleveland, Ohio
- 1948 - Eugene Linscott, Grand Rapids, Michigan
- 1949 - Maurice Harper, Oakland, California
- 1950 - Gil Turner, Philadelphia, Pennsylvania
- 1951 - Rudy Gwin, Cleveland, Ohio
- 1952 - Andy Anderson, US Navy
- 1953 - Fred Terry, Germantown, Pennsylvania
- 1954 - Joe Bethea, Seattle, WA
- 1955 - Walter Sabbath, Detroit, Michigan
- 1956 - Jackson Brown, US Air Force
- 1957 - Don Jullinger, Lima, Ohio
- 1958 - Gary Gauvink, New York, New York (boxed professionally as Grey Gavin)
- 1959 - Vernon Vinson, Cleveland, Ohio
- 1960 - Phil Baldwin, Muskegon, Michigan
- 1961 - Phil Baldwin, Muskegon, Michigan
- 1962 - Wade Smith, Muncie, Indiana
- 1963 - Wade Smith, Muncie, Indiana
- 1964 - Jess Valdez, Houston, Texas
- 1965 - Hedgemon Lewis, Detroit, Michigan
- 1966 - Roland Pryor, Washington, D.C.
- 1967 - Kim Booker, San Francisco, California
- 1968 - Mike Colbert, Portland, OR
- 1969 - Armando Muniz, US Army
- 1970 - Armando Muniz, US Army
- 1971 - Sammy Maul, Dayton, Ohio
- 1972 - Fred Washington, US Army
- 1973 - William Tuttle, Bowie, MD
- 1974 - Clint Jackson, Nashville, Tennessee
- 1975 - Clint Jackson, Nashville, Tennessee
- 1976 - Clint Jackson, Nashville, Tennessee
- 1977 - Mike McCallum, Nashville, Tennessee
- 1978 - Roger Leonard, US Air Force
- 1979 - Donald Curry, Fort Worth, Texas
- 1980 - Gene Hatcher, Fort Worth, Texas
- 1981 - Darryl Robinson, Houston, Texas
- 1982 - Mark Breland, New York, New York (spring), Ron Essett (winter)
- 1983 - Mark Breland, New York, New York
- 1984 - Darryl Lattimore, Washington, D.C.
- 1985 - Kenneth Gould, Rockford, Illinois
- 1986 - Kenneth Gould, Rockford, Illinois
- 1987 - Kenneth Gould, Rockford, Illinois
- 1988 - Alton Rice, US Army
- 1989 - Raúl Márquez, Houston, Texas
- 1990 - Emmett Linton, Tacoma, WA
- 1991 - Pat Briceno, Vancouver, WA
- 1992 - Clayton Williams, Roseville, California
- 1993 - Hector Colon, Milwaukee, Wisconsin
- 1994 - David Reid, Philadelphia, Pennsylvania
- 1995 - Bobby Lewis, Cincinnati, Ohio
- 1996 - David Palac, Hamtramck, Michigan
- 1997 - LeChaunce Shepherd, Milwaukee, Wisconsin
- 1998 - Larry Mosley, Los Angeles, California
- 1999 - Larry Mosley, Los Angeles, California
- 2000 - LeChaunce Shepherd, Milwaukee, Wisconsin
- 2001 - Anthony Thompson, Philadelphia, Pennsylvania
- 2002 - Rondale Mason, Fort Carson, Colorado
- 2003 - Juan McPherson, Cleveland, Ohio
- 2004 - Austin Trout, Las Cruces, New Mexico
- 2005 - Demetrius Andrade, Providence, Rhode Island
- 2006 - Demetrius Andrade, Providence, Rhode Island
- 2007 - Charles Hatley, Dallas, Texas
- 2008 - Javontae Starks, Minneapolis, MN
- 2009 - Errol Spence Jr., Desoto, TX
- 2010 - Errol Spence Jr., Desoto, TX
- 2011 - Errol Spence Jr., Desoto, TX
- 2012 - Patrick Day, Freeport, NY
- 2013 - Jamontay Clark, Cincinnati, OH
- 2014 - Jose Alday, Odessa, TX
- 2015 - Ardreal Holmes, Flint, MI
- 2019 - Jameel Fields-Carr, Omaha, Ne
