= Joe Louis vs. Rocky Marciano =

Boxing match

- Date: October 26, 1951
- Venue: Madison Square Garden, New York City, New York, U.S.

Tale of the tape
Boxer	Joe Louis	Rocky Marciano
Nickname	"The Brown Bomber"	"The Brockton Blockbuster"
Hometown	Detroit, Michigan, U.S.	Brockton, Massachusetts, U.S.
Purse	$132,000	$44,000
Pre-fight record	66–2 (52 KO)	37–0 (32 KO)
Age	37 years, 5 months	28 years, 1 month
Height	6 ft 1 1/2 in (187 cm)	5 ft 10 in (178 cm)
Weight	213 3/4 lb (97 kg)	184 lb (83 kg)
Style	Orthodox	Orthodox
Recognition	NBA; No. 2 Ranked Heavyweight; The Ring; No. 1 Ranked Heavyweight; Former undisputed heavyweight champion	NBA/The Ring; No. 3 Ranked Heavyweight

Result
- Marciano defeats Louis by 8th round TKO

Joe Louis vs. Rocky Marciano was a heavyweight boxing match contested on October 26, 1951.

== Background ==
Following his first defeat in over 14 years against Ezzard Charles in September 1950, former undisputed heavyweight champion Joe Louis had returned to the ring two months later. With his debt to the IRS remaining he fought 8 times in the following 9 months, facing mostly club level fighters, with the exception of a knockout of Lee Savold and a points win over Jimmy Bivins. Unbeaten contender Rocky Marciano had fought six times in 1951 stopping all but one of his opponents, the most notable was a 6th round knockout of top contender Rex Layne in July. On August 29, promoter James D. Norris announced that Louis and Marciano would face off in a 10 round bout on October 11, outside at the Polo Grounds. This was later pushed back to October 26, indoors at Madison Square Garden. It was reported that this was done in order to avoid a clash with the 1951 World Series between the New York Yankees and the New York Giants. It was believed that the International Boxing Club had guaranteed Louis $300,000 for the bout.

Speaking to the press during the build up Louis spoke of having a rematch with now former champion Charles and a third bout with new champion Jersey Joe Walcott, saying "Jim Norris spoke to me about fighting Charles in Miami this February, I'd like that. It would do good, don't you think?" He added that "As long as either Walcott or Charles is champion, I'm going to keep chasing, I don't know how long that's going to be, but I'll be waiting. I'm going to stick around while either one of them is champion. I can beat them. Of course if some 23-year-old kid comes along and wins the title somehow, then I guess I'll have to call it quits. Cause then, by the time I get a shot, my grey beard will be hanging around my knees."

When odds for the bout opened Louis was a 12 to 5 favourite to win however as the fight neared they dropped to as low as 6 to 5.

== The fight ==
In front of a near capacity crowd of 17,241, Marciano would largely control the bout. The 28 year old Marciano would swarm Louis in the first round, shaking the former champ with a looping right to jaw late in the round. Louis was able to control the fourth and fifth rounds with his jab, bloodying the nose of Marciano as he was pushed back. By the sixth Louis appeared to tire, and the much younger Rocky would take advantage. The 7th round saw Louis sent buckling into the ropes by a right hand, and later bent double from a hook. At the start of the 8th, Marciano hurt Louis with a hook and soon after another left hook sent him down to the canvas. Louis beat the count but Marciano landed another left hook followed by a right to the jaw that send the Brown Bomber through the ropes and on to the ring apron and referee Ruby Goldstein immediately stopped the fight.

At the time of the stoppage Marciano led on all three scorecards, with scores of 5–2, 4–2–1 and 4–3. The AP had it 4–2–1 for Marciano.

== Aftermath ==
Speaking in his dressing room after the bout Marciano told the press "I knew I had him when he dropped his right after that left hook. I'm glad I won, but sorry I had to do it to him."

Although Louis had said during his training camp that he would retire for good if he was knocked out or badly beaten, when speaking in his own dressing room he hesitated, saying "I won't say anything about retiring until Monday when I go to the IBC office I don't want to make any hasty decision. Marciano is harder to hit than he looks." When asked if Schmeling had hit him harder in his last stoppage loss 15 years earlier, Louis asked "Well this boy took me out with two or three punches. It took Schmeling 100. Of course, I was 22 years old then." While visiting the dressing room, Louis's former Army touring companion, Sugar Ray Robinson, reportedly wept, with Marciano also attempted to console Louis, saying, "I'm sorry, Joe". "What's the use of crying?" Louis is reported to have said, "The better man won. I guess everything happens for the best".

Louis would officially announce his retirement on 14 February 1952, saying "I made up my mind when I was knocked out by Rocky Marciano."

== Undercard ==
Confirmed bouts:

Preceded by vs. Jimmy Bivins	Joe Louis's bouts 26 October 1951	Retired
Preceded by vs. Freddie Beshore	Rocky Marciano's bouts 26 October 1951	Succeeded by vs. Lee Savold
Awards
Preceded by Jake LaMotta vs. Laurent Dauthuille II; Round 15	The Ring Round of the Year; Round 8; 1951	Succeeded by Jersey Joe Walcott vs. Rocky Marciano; Round 13
