= List of United States national amateur boxing middleweight champions =

Below is a list of National Amateur Boxing Middleweight Champions, also known as United States Amateur Champions, along with the state or region which they represented. The United States National Boxing Championships bestow the title of United States Amateur Champion on amateur boxers for winning the annual national amateur boxing tournament organized by USA Boxing, the national governing body for Olympic boxing and is the United States' member organization of the International Amateur Boxing Association (AIBA). It is one of the four premier amateur boxing tournaments, the others being the National Golden Gloves Tournament, which crowns its own amateur middleweight champion, the Police Athletic League Tournament, and the United States Armed Forces Tournament, all sending champions to the US Olympic Trials. It is contested at 165lbs.

== Winners ==
- 1888 – P. Cahill, S.A.A.C.
- 1889 – P. Cahill, S.A.A.C. and W.H. Stuckey, New York, New York
- 1890 – P. Cahill, S.A.A.C
- 1891 – W.H. Stuckey, New York, New York
- 1892 – Not Held
- 1893 – A. Black, PASC
- 1894 – O. Harney, New York, New York
- 1895 – M. Lewis, Pittsburgh, Pennsylvania
- 1896 – George Schwegler, NYAC
- 1897 – A. McIntosh, New York, New York
- 1898 – Not Held
- 1899 – A. McIntosh, New York, New York
- 1900 – W. Rodenbach, New York, New York
- 1901 – W. Rodenbach, New York, New York
- 1902 – W. Rodenbach, New York, New York
- 1903 – W. Rodenbach, New York, New York
- 1904 – W. Rodenbach, New York, New York
- 1905 – Charles Mayer, St. Georgia
- 1906 – Henry Ficke, San Francisco
- 1907 – W. McKinnon, St. Phillip's
- 1908 – Henry Hall, Boston, Massachusetts
- 1909 – Dan Sullivan, Cambridge, Massachusetts
- 1910 – William Beckman, New York, New York
- 1911 – Napoleon Boutellier, Boston, Massachusetts
- 1912 – Arthur Sheridan, Brooklyn, New York
- 1913 – William Barrett, New York, New York
- 1914 – William Barrett, New York, New York
- 1915 – Adolph Kaufman, New York, New York
- 1916 – Adolph Kaufman, New York, New York
- 1917 – Eugene Brosseau, Montreal, Quebec, Canada
- 1918 – Martin Burke, New Orleans, Louisiana
- 1919 – Sam Lagonia, New York, New York
- 1920 – Sam Lagonia, New York, New York
- 1921 – Sam Lagonia, New York, New York
- 1922 – William Antrobus, New York, New York
- 1923 – Homer Robertson, Pittsburgh, Pennsylvania
- 1924 – Ben Funk, Yale University
- 1925 – Clayton Frye, Los Angeles, California
- 1926 – Arthur Flynn, Lawrence, Massachusetts
- 1927 – Joseph Hanlon, New York, New York
- 1928 – Harry Henderson, Annapolis, Maryland
- 1929 – Ray Lopez, Watertown, Massachusetts
- 1930 – Ring Larson, Quincy, Massachusetts
- 1931 – Frank Fullam, New York, New York
- 1932 – Fred Caserio, Chicago, Illinois
- 1933 – Tom Chester, New York, New York
- 1934 – Fred Apostoli, San Francisco, California
- 1935 – Dave Clark, Detroit, Michigan
- 1936 – Jimmy Clark, Jamestown, New York
- 1937 – Ted Cerwin, Detroit, Michigan
- 1938 – Bradley Lewis, New York, New York
- 1939 – Ezzard Charles, Cincinnati, Ohio
- 1940 – Joey Maxim, Cleveland, Ohio
- 1941 – James Mulligan, Lowell, Massachusetts
- 1942 – Sampson Powell, Cleveland, Ohio
- 1943 – Sampson Powell, Cleveland, Ohio
- 1944 – Frank Sweeney, Washington, D.C.
- 1945 – Allen Faulkner, Buffalo, New York
- 1946 – Harold Anspach, Cherry Point, New York
- 1947 – Nick Ranieri, Chicago, Illinois
- 1948 – Raymond Bryan, New York, New York
- 1949 – Albert Raymond, Philadelphia, Pennsylvania
- 1950 – Wes Echols, Atwater, California
- 1951 – Thomas Nelson, Philadelphia, Pennsylvania
- 1952 – Floyd Patterson, New York, New York
- 1953 – Bryant Thompson, Philadelphia, Pennsylvania
- 1954 – Donald McCray, Roxbury, Massachusetts
- 1955 – Paul Wright, U.S. Air Force
- 1956 – Paul Wright, U.S. Air Force
- 1957 – Alex Ford, Youngstown, Ohio
- 1958 – José Torres, New York, New York
- 1959 – Jimmy McQueen, Elyria, Ohio
- 1960 – Leotis Martin, Toledo, Ohio
- 1961 – Leotis Martin, Toledo, Ohio
- 1962 – Richard Gosha, Chicago, Illinois
- 1963 – Robert Williams, U.S. Air Force
- 1964 – Will Cross, Portland, Oregon
- 1965 – George Cooper, Oakland, California
- 1966 – Martino Berzewski, San Antonio, Texas
- 1967 – Len Hutchins, Detroit, Michigan
- 1968 – Al Jones, Detroit, Michigan
- 1969 – Larry Ward, Milwaukee, Wisconsin
- 1970 – John Magnum, Michigan
- 1971 – Joey Hadley, Memphis, Tennessee
- 1972 – Mike Colbert, Portland, Oregon
- 1973 – Marvin Hagler, Brockton, Massachusetts
- 1974 – Vonzell Johnson, Columbus, Ohio
- 1975 – Tommy Brooks, U.S. Air Force
- 1976 – Keith Broom, U.S. Navy
- 1977 – Jerome Bennett, U.S. Air Force
- 1978 – Jeff McCracken, U.S. Marines
- 1979 – Alex Ramos, Bronx, New York
- 1980 – Martin Pierce, Flint, Michigan
- 1981 – Michael Grogan, Atlanta, Georgia
- 1982 – Michael Grogan, Atlanta, Georgia
- 1983 – Michael Grogan, Atlanta, Georgia
- 1984 – Percy Harris, Baltimore, Maryland
- 1985 – Darin Allen, Columbus, Ohio
- 1986 – Anthony Hembrick, U.S. Army
- 1987 – Anthony Hembrick, U.S. Army
- 1988 – Jerome James, Sioux Falls, SD
- 1989 – Ray Lathon, St. Louis, Missouri
- 1990 – Michael DeMoss, U.S. Marines
- 1991 – Chris Byrd, Flint, Michigan
- 1992 – Chris Byrd, Flint, Michigan
- 1993 – Eric Wright, U.S. Army
- 1994 – Shane Swartz, Fort Collins, Colorado
- 1995 – Shane Swartz, Fort Collins, Colorado
- 1996 – Omar Sheika, Paterson, New Jersey
- 1997 – Jorge Hawley, Fontana, California
- 1998 – Jeff Lacy, St. Petersburg, Florida
- 1999 – Arthur Palac, Hamtramck, Michigan
- 2000 – Matt Godfrey, Providence, Rhode Island
- 2001 – Andre Ward, Oakland, California
- 2002 – Julius Fogle, Fort Carson, Colorado
- 2003 – Andre Dirrell, Flint, Michigan
- 2004 – James Johnson, Converse, Texas
- 2005 – Edwin Rodriguez, Worcester, Massachusetts
- 2006 – Daniel Jacobs, Brooklyn
- 2007 – Fernando Guerrero, Salisbury, Maryland
- 2008 – Luis Arias, Milwaukee, WI
- 2009 – Terrell Gausha, Cleveland, OH
- 2010 – Saul Jr Jimenez, Oklahoma City, Ok
- 2011 – Chris Pearson, Trotwood, OH
- 2012 – Terrell Gausha, Cleveland, OH
