= Alfredo Zuany =

Mexican boxer

Personal information
- Nickname: Zurdo Chihuahua
- Born: 21 July 1934 Ciudad Juárez, Chihuahua, Mexico
- Died: February 19, 2007 (aged 72)
- Height: 1.92 m (6 ft 4 in)
- Weight: Heavyweight

Boxing career
- Reach: 199 cm (78 in)
- Stance: Orthodox

Boxing record
- Total fights: 38
- Wins: 34
- Win by KO: 21
- Losses: 3
- Draws: 1
- No contests: 0

Alfredo Zuany (21 July 1934 – 19 February 2007) was a Mexican professional boxer who competed from 1955 to 1961, and the former Mexican National Heavyweight Champion.

== Early life ==
Alfredo was a Mexican boxer of Italian heritage from his father's side. He lived in Los Angeles and married Alicia Saenz in 1962. They had three children (sons Alfredo, Tony, Chago) and three grandchildren (Stephanie Zuany, Steven Zuany, Dianna Zuany).

== Professional career ==
In November 1957, Zuany beat the undefeated Puggy Jones by K.O. just 32 seconds into the sixth round of their bout in Phoenix, Arizona.

In September 1959, Zuany beat the former world heavyweight champion Ezzard Charles by unanimous decision. The bout was held in Ciudad Juarez, Chihuahua.

Mexican Olympic team for the Helsinki Games Pan-American Game participant Central American Game participant. Zuany died on February 19, 2007, at the age of 72.

== Professional boxing record ==
34 Wins (21 knockouts, 13 decisions), 3 Losses, 1 Draw
Res.	Record	Opponent	Type	Rd., Time	Date	Location	Notes
Win	34–3–1	(United States) Joe Thomas	UD	10	1961-08-22	(United States) Sam Houston Coliseum, Houston, Texas	
Win	33–3–1	(United States) Willie Lee	TKO	2 (10)	1961-07-11	(United States) Sam Houston Coliseum, Houston, Texas	
Win	32–3–1	(United Kingdom) Dave Rent	TKO	8 (10)	1960-10-04	(United States) Sam Houston Coliseum, Houston, Texas	
Loss	31–3–1	(United States) Larry Maldonado	TKO	9 (10)	1960-07-15	(United States) Dudley Field, El Paso, Texas	For USA Arizona state Heavyweight title.
Win	31–2–1	(Mexico) Yaqui Lopez	KO	1 (12), 2:14	1960-06-28	(Mexico) Plaza de Toros, Ciudad Juarez, Chihuahua	Retained Mexico Heavyweight title.
Win	30–2–1	(United States) Tommy Sims	UD	8	1960-04-25	(United States) Sam Houston Coliseum, Houston, Texas	
Draw	29–2–1	(United States) Otis Fuller	SD	10	1959-11-12	(United States) County Coliseum, El Paso, Texas	
Win	29–2	(United States) Matt Jackson	KO	6 (10), 2:50	1959-09-01	(Mexico) Plaza de Toros, Ciudad Juarez, Chihuahua	
Win	28–2	(United States) Donnie Fleeman	SD	10	1959-07-03	(United States) County Coliseum, El Paso, Texas	
Win	27–2	(United States) Alvin Williams	UD	10	1959-05-26	(United States) County Coliseum, El Paso, Texas	
Win	26–2	(United States) Matt Jackson	SD	10	1959-04-14	(United States) Municipal Auditorium, San Antonio, Texas	
Loss	25–2	(United States) Alvin Williams	TKO	8 (10), 2:46	1959-04-07	(United States) Town Hall, Corpus Christi, Texas	
Win	25–1	(United States) Freddy Milton	TKO	1 (10), 2:31	1959-03-03	(United States) County Coliseum, El Paso, Texas	
Win	24–1	(Mexico) Toro Cardenas	KO	2 (12), 0:49	1959-03-03	(Mexico) Auditorio Municipal, Ciudad Juarez, Chihuahua	Won vacant Mexico Heavyweight title.
Win	23–1	(United States) Frankie Haynes	KO	2 (10), 1:06	1959-01-09	(United States) Freeman Coliseum, San Antonio, Texas	
Win	22–1	(United States) Bob Baker	UD	10	1958-11-30	(Mexico) Plaza de Toros, Ciudad Juarez, Chihuahua	
Win	21–1	(United States) Ezzard Charles	UD	10	1958-09-30	(Mexico) Plaza de Toros, Ciudad Juarez, Chihuahua	
Win	20–1	(United States) Sonny Andrews	KO	2 (10)	1958-08-26	(Mexico) Plaza de Toros, Ciudad Juarez, Chihuahua	
Win	19–1	(United States) David Walker	TKO	9 (10)	1958-06-09	(United States) Sports Center, Tucson, Arizona	
Win	18–1	(United States) Cal Cooper	TKO	1 (8)	1958-04-09	(United States) Cow Palace, Daly City, California	
Win	17–1	(United States) Walter Robinson	KO	2 (8)	1958-03-18	(United States) Auditorium, Richmond, California	
Win	16–1	(United States) Otis Fuller	KO	4 (10), 2:54	1958-01-27	(Mexico) Auditorio Municipal, Ciudad Juarez, Chihuahua	
Win	15–1	(United States) Lajuin Burks	KO	1 (10), 1:06	1958-01-14	(United States) Madison Square, Phoenix, Arizona	
Win	14–1	(United States) Puggy Jones	TKO	6 (10), 1:49	1957-11-21	(United States) Coliseum, Phoenix, Arizona	
Win	13–1	(United States) Otis Fuller	UD	10	1957-09-17	(United States) Madison Square, Phoenix, Arizona	
Win	12–1	(United States) Alvin Williams	UD	10	1957-08-27	(United States) Madison Square, Phoenix, Arizona	
Win	11–1	(United States) Willie Scott	TKO	2 (8)	1957-08-05	(United States) Memorial Auditorium, Dallas, Texas	
Win	10–1	(United States) Ted Hutchinson	UD	8	1957-07-09	(United States) Coliseum, Phoenix, Arizona	
Win	9–1	(United States) Johnny Hollins	UD	8	1957-06-20	(United States) County Coliseum, El Paso, Texas	
Win	8–1	(United States) Fred Lewis	KO	2 (8)	1957-05-14	(Mexico) Plaza de Toros, Ciudad Juarez, Chihuahua	
Loss	7–1	(United States) Monroe Ratliff	SD	8	1956-06-30	(United States) Legion Stadium, Hollywood, California	
Win	7–0	(United States) Gene Thompson	UD	8	1956-06-09	(United States) Legion Stadium, Hollywood, California	
Win	6–0	(United States) Chubby Duez	UD	8	1956-05-19	(United States) Legion Stadium, Hollywood, California	
Win	5–0	(United States) Kid Percy	KO	1 (8), 1:02	1956-04-21	(United States) Legion Stadium, Hollywood, California	
Win	4–0	(United States) Jose Gaitan	TKO	3 (6), 2:08	1955-12-05	(Mexico) Auditorio Municipal, Ciudad Juarez, Chihuahua	
Win	3–0	(United States) Jose Gaitan	KO	2 (6), 1:04	1955-10-10	(United States) County Coliseum, El Paso, Texas	
Win	2–0	(United States) Tommy Ramirez	KO	1 (6), 2:28	1955-09-21	(Mexico) Auditorio Municipal, Ciudad Juarez, Chihuahua	
Win	1–0	(United States) Tommy Ramirez	KO	1 (6), 1:19	1955-08-24	(Mexico) Auditorio Municipal, Ciudad Juarez, Chihuahua	
