= List of United States national amateur boxing light flyweight champions =

Below is a list of United States national Amateur Boxing Light Flyweight Champions, also known as United States Amateur Champions, along with the state or region which they represented. The United States National Boxing Championships bestow the title of United States Amateur Champion on amateur boxers for winning the annual national amateur boxing tournament organized by USA Boxing, the national governing body for Olympic boxing and is the United States' member organization of the International Amateur Boxing Association (AIBA). It is one of the four amateur boxing tournaments, the others being the National Golden Gloves Tournament, which crowns its own amateur light flyweight champion, the Police Athletic League Tournament, and the United States Armed Forces Tournament, all sending champions to the US Olympic Trials.

- 1967 – Benny Gerolaga
- 1968 – Harlan Marbley
- 1969 – Dennis Mince
- 1970 – Elijah Cooper
- 1971 – Garry Griffin
- 1972 – David Armstrong
- 1973 – Albert Sandoval
- 1974 – Claudell Atkins
- 1975 – Claudell Atkins
- 1976 – Brett Summers
- 1977 – Israel Acosta
- 1978 – James Cullins
- 1979 – Richard Sandoval
- 1980 – Robert Shannon
- 1981 – Jesse Benevidez
- 1982 – Mario Lesperance
- 1982 – Bryan Jones
- 1983 – Paul Gonzales
- 1984 – James Harris
- 1985 – Brian Lonon
- 1986 – Brian Lonon
- 1987 – Brian Lonon
- 1988 – Michael Carbajal
- 1989 – Mark Johnson
- 1990 – John Herrera
- 1991 – Eric Griffin
- 1992 – Bradley Martinez
- 1993 – Albert Guardado
- 1994 – Albert Guardado
- 1995 – Pedro Pean
- 1996 – Albert Guardado
- 1997 – Gabriel Elizondo
- 1998 – Ronald Siler
- 1999 – Brian Viloria
- 2000 – Nonito Donaire
- 2001 – Ronald Siler
- 2002 – Aaron Alafa
- 2003 – Austreberto Juarez
- 2004 – Austreberto Juarez
- 2005 – Marco Rangel
- 2006 – Luis Yáñez
- 2007 – Luis Yáñez
- 2008 – Ronald Siler
- 2009 – Miguel Cartagena
