= Charles Hatley =

American boxer

Personal information
- Nickname: The Future
- Born: January 26, 1986 (age 40) Dallas, Texas, U.S.
- Height: 5 ft 10 in (178 cm)
- Weight: Welterweight; Light middleweight

Boxing career
- Reach: 72 in (183 cm)
- Stance: Orthodox

Boxing record
- Total fights: 34
- Wins: 30
- Win by KO: 21
- Losses: 3
- Draws: 1

Charles Hatley (born January 26, 1986) is an American professional boxer.

== Amateur career ==
Hatley had a record of 250-12 during his amateur career. He also won the 2007 U.S. National Amateur welterweight championship and was a 2008 Olympic alternate.

== Professional career ==
In May 2009, Charles knocked out Puerto Rico's Carlos Garcia in the first round. On September 29, 2010, he won an eight-round unanimous decision over the veteran Emanuel Augustus.

Hatley won the WBC Silver junior middleweight world title belt in 2015 from Anthony Mundine. He subsequently lost his WBC Silver belt in his first defence in 2017. He was knocked out by Jermell Charlo in April 2017.
