= Ezzard Charles =

American boxer (1921–1975)

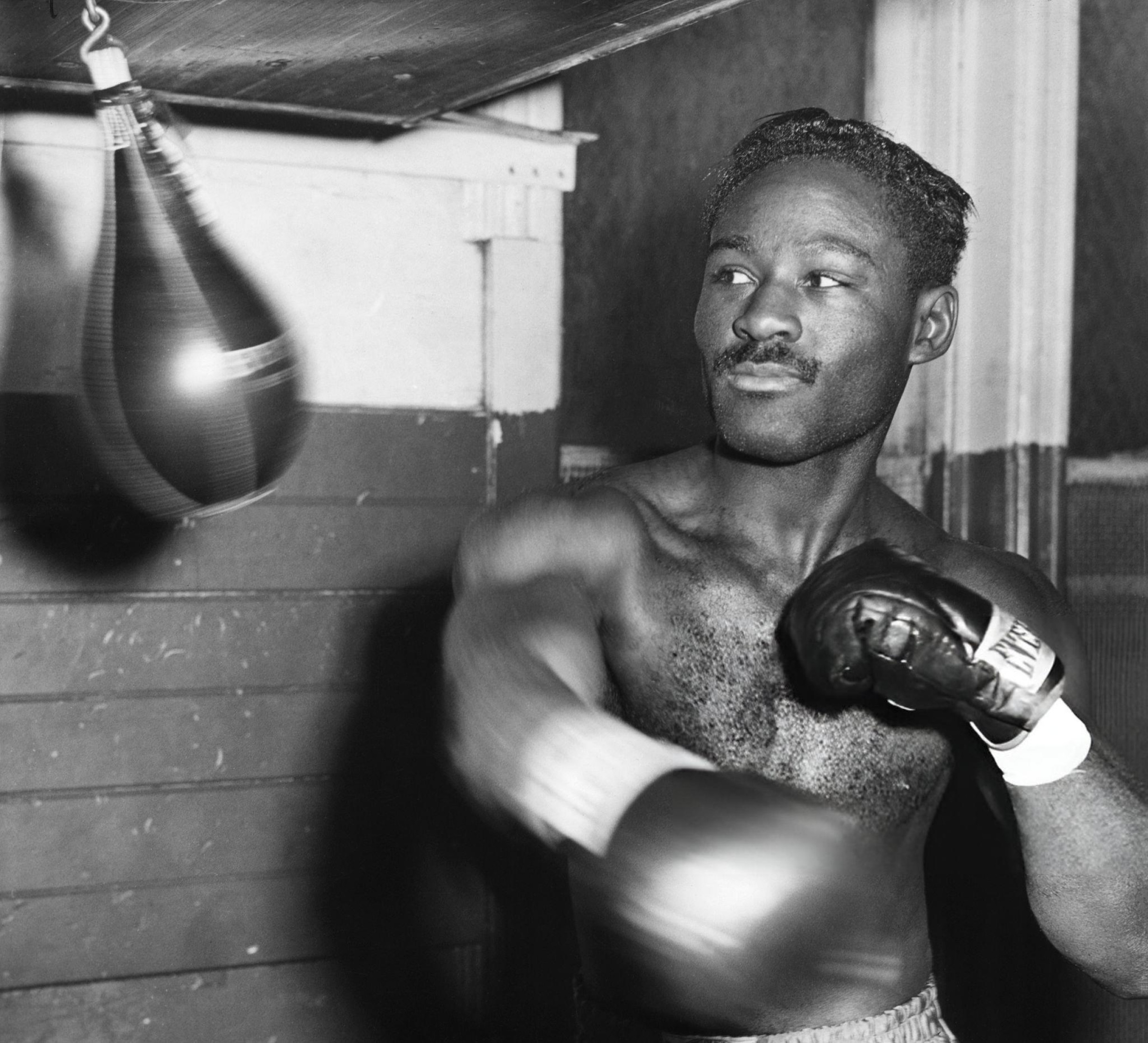
- Charles in 1948

Personal information
- Nickname: The Cincinnati Cobra
- Born: Ezzard Mack Charles; July 7, 1921 Lawrenceville, Georgia, U.S.
- Died: May 28, 1975 (aged 53) Chicago, Illinois, U.S.
- Height: 6 ft 0 in (183 cm)
- Weight: Middleweight; Light-heavyweight; Heavyweight

Boxing career
- Reach: 73 in (185 cm)
- Stance: Orthodox

Boxing record
- Total fights: 121
- Wins: 95
- Win by KO: 52
- Losses: 25
- Draws: 1
Medal record
Men's amateur boxing
Cincinnati Golden Gloves
Bronze medal – third place	1937 Cincinnati	Welterweight
Gold medal – first place	1938 Cincinnati	Welterweight
Gold medal – first place	1939 Cincinnati	Middleweight
Chicago Golden Gloves
Gold medal – first place	1939 Chicago	Middleweight
Ohio District AAU Championships
Gold medal – first place	1937 Cincinnati	Welterweight
Gold medal – first place	1938 Cincinnati	Welterweight
Gold medal – first place	1939 Cincinnati	Middleweight
National AAU Championships
Gold medal – first place	1939 San Francisco	Middleweight

Ezzard Mack Charles (July 7, 1921 – May 28, 1975) was an American professional boxer who competed from 1940 to 1959. Known as "the Cincinnati Cobra", Charles was respected for his slick defense and precision, and is often regarded as the greatest light heavyweight of all time, and one of the greatest fighters pound for pound, having defeated numerous Hall of Fame fighters in three different weight classes. Charles was the world heavyweight champion from 1949 to 1951, and made eight successful title defenses in under two years.

After losing the world title, Charles continued to fight several top rated heavyweight contenders and made three close but unsuccessful attempts at reclaiming the heavyweight championship. Charles eventually retired from a near two decade long career with a record of 95–25–1. He was posthumously inducted into the International Boxing Hall of Fame as part of the inaugural class of 1990.

== Career ==
Charles was born in Lawrenceville, Georgia on July 7, 1921. After his parents divorced, Charles moved to Cincinnati, Ohio at the age of nine to live with his grandmother and his great-grandmother. Charles graduated from Woodward High School in Cincinnati where he was already becoming a well-known fighter (greatly inspired by fighters Kid Chocolate and later Joe Louis). Known as "the Cincinnati Cobra", Charles fought many notable opponents in the middleweight, light heavyweight and heavyweight divisions, eventually winning the World Championship in the latter. Although he never won the Light Heavyweight title, The Ring has rated him as the greatest light heavyweight of all time.

=== Career beginnings and military service ===
Charles began boxing as an amateur and won the national Amateur Athletic Union (AAU) middleweight championship in 1939.

On March 12, 1940, Charles launched his professional boxing career by scoring a fourth-round knockout against Melody Johnson in Middletown, Ohio. He went on to win his first 15 professional contests before facing Ken Overlin on June 9, 1941, in an outdoor match at Crosley Field in Cincinnati. Overlin, a seasoned fighter who had turned professional in 1931, had compiled 147 bouts and held recognition as NYSAC middleweight champion in 1940. During their encounter, Charles was dropped in the second round and suffered a unanimous decision defeat, marking the first loss of his professional career.

Over the following nine months, Charles rebounded by defeating former titleholders Teddy Yarosz and Anton Christoforidis and later fought Overlin to a draw in a rematch. Before the close of 1942, he also earned two decision victories over future light heavyweight champion Joey Maxim.

Charles fought only twice in 1943, enduring difficult defeats in both outings. Jimmy Bivins knocked him down seven times in one bout, while Lloyd Marshall floored him eight times before the referee halted the contest in the eighth round. During World War II, Charles served in the military and captured the Inter-Allied light heavyweight championship in Rome in 1944.

=== Return ===
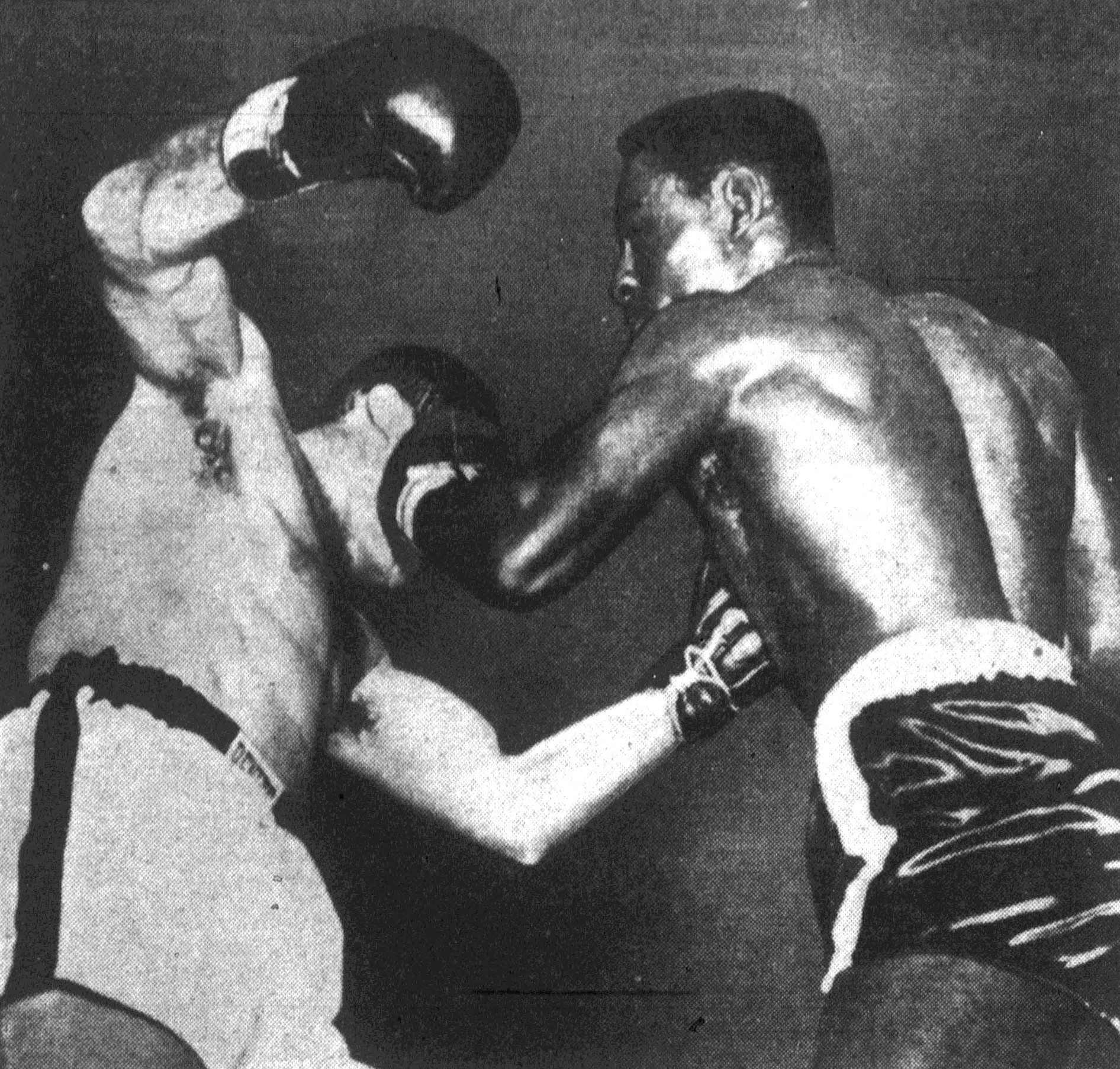
Charles (right) scores a left hook to the head of Joey Maxim on May 30, 1951, at Chicago Stadium

Returning to the ring after his discharge in 1946, Charles won all ten of his fights that year, including victories over Marshall and future light heavyweight champion Archie Moore. He defeated Moore again in 1947 and posted an impressive record of 11 wins in 12 bouts that year, with his only setback coming in a disputed split decision against hard hitting Elmer "Violent" Ray, which he later avenged.

In February 1948, however, tragedy struck during a bout in Chicago when Charles knocked out a young fighter named Sam Baroudi, who later died from a cerebral hemorrhage sustained in the contest. Deeply shaken by the incident, Charles considered retiring from boxing. At the encouragement of Baroudi's family, he chose to continue fighting and contributed the purses from that match and his subsequent bout to them.

=== World heavyweight champion ===
When reigning heavyweight champion Joe Louis retired on March 1, 1949, the title was left vacant. On June 22, the National Boxing Association (NBA) matched Charles with Jersey Joe Walcott for the championship at Comiskey Park in Chicago. Weighing just 181 pounds and conceding 14 pounds to Walcott, Charles prevailed by unanimous decision to claim the NBA world heavyweight crown.

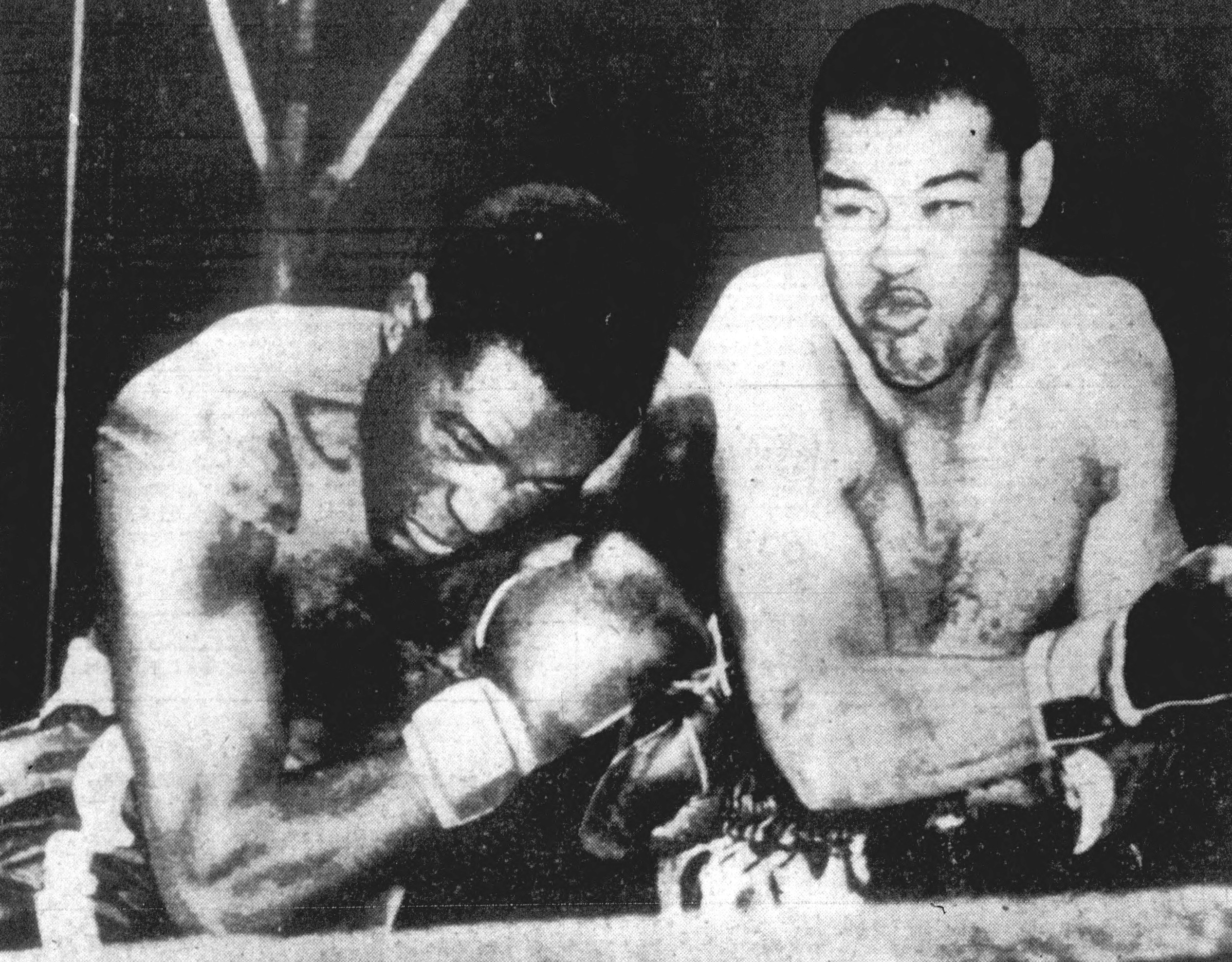
Charles (left) ducks under a right thrown by Joe Louis (right) during their 1950 title fight

Charles' first defense of his title was set for August 10, 1949, at Yankee Stadium in New York City, against Gus Lesnevich. Charles was awarded a knockout when Lesnevich could not answer the bell for the eighth round. The United Press (UP) reported: "Lesnevich, former world light heavyweight champion, could scarcely see out of either eye, and he was bleeding from gashes above and below his right eye and from a gash on his left cheek at the end of the seventh round". Six weeks later at the Cow Palace near San Francisco, Charles knocked out Pat Valentino in the eighth round. Valentino would lose his sight in one eye after this fight. On August 15, 1950, Charles put his title on the line by fighting Freddie Beshore in Buffalo. Charles won by technical knockout (TKO) in the 14th round.

In 1950, Joe Louis returned from retirement, due to troubles with the IRS, and challenged Charles for the undisputed heavyweight championship on September 27 at Yankee Stadium. Giving up 34 pounds, Charles nonetheless outboxed Louis convincingly and secured universal recognition as champion. Over the next year, he remained an active titleholder, defending the championship four times within 12 months by stopping Nick Barone and Lee Oma, and winning decisions against Walcott and Maxim. For these achievements in such a short span of time, Charles was named The Ring's Fighter of the Year twice consecutively in 1949 and 1950.

==== Charles vs. Marciano ====
Charles lost the title to Walcott on July 18, 1951, when he was stopped in the seventh round. Having been defeated twice before, Walcott was a 9:1 underdog, but scored a major upset, knocking out Charles with a perfect left hook to the jaw. Nearly a year later, on June 5, 1952, he met Walcott again but fell short in a closely contested unanimous 15-round decision. Remaining a top contender with wins over Rex Layne, Tommy Harrison and Coley Wallace, Charles scored a second-round knockout over Bob Satterfield in a heavyweight title eliminator bout on January 13, 1954. Charles was now next in line to challenge the new heavyweight champion: Rocky Marciano.

The two stirring battles between Charles and Marciano are regarded as ring classics. In the first bout, held at Yankee Stadium on June 17, 1954, he valiantly took Marciano the distance, losing by a unanimous decision. Charles is the only man ever to last the full 15-round distance against Marciano. Referee Ruby Goldstein scored the bout 8–5–2 in rounds for the champion. Judge Artie Aidala scored the fight 9–5–1 while judge Harold Barnes' tally was 8–6–1. In their September rematch, Charles landed a severe blow that actually split Marciano's nose in half. Marciano's cornermen were unable to stop the bleeding and the referee almost halted the contest until Marciano rallied with an eighth-round knockout. The fight was awarded The Ring’s 1954 Fight of the Year.

=== Later career ===
Unfortunately for Charles, like many boxers, financial problems forced him to continue fighting. Age and damage sustained during his career caused Charles to begin a sharp decline following his title fights. Over the next four years, he lost on points to heavyweight contenders Tommy "Hurricane" Jackson, Harry Matthews and heavyweight champion of Mexico, Alfredo Zuany. He was also disqualified during a fight against Dick Richardson, who later became the European heavyweight champion. Overall Charles lost 13 of his final 23 fights. Charles retired after his final bout on September 1, 1959. He finished with a final record of 95–25–1 and scored 52 knockout victories.

=== Professional Wrestling career ===
After boxing, Charles went into professional wrestling in 1960. He retired from wrestling in 1962.

== Fighting style ==
"Ezzard Charles. Who else has been great in every division he fought in?" - James Toney

Ezzard Charles was one of the greatest ring technicians that ever laced on a pair of gloves. He could seamlessly blend between defence and offense and adapt on the fly. Charles fought side on, leaning slightly to the right to take his head off the centre from the line of attack. This increases the distance the opponent's punch has to travel as well, giving him more time to see punches coming. This 'old-school' stance was similar to those of Joe Louis, Charley Burley and Sandy Saddler. Charles parried with both of his hands and smothered opponents on the inside, even against larger men, he was fully capable of trapping the opponent's glove to prevent them from punching on the inside. On the outside range, Charles would stalk his prey, circling leftwards and utilising his lightning-quick probing jab to attack both the head and body to properly gauge the opponent's distance. Charles was also well known for his use of the shoulder roll. James Toney credits Charles as the inspiration for his variation of the shoulder roll. In his prime, Ezzard would be exceedingly aggressive, often relying on his thunderous power and accuracy to win exchanges. However, some would note that after Sam Baroudi died of injuries during their 1948 fight, Charles is alleged to have become less aggressive and more cautious, although this theory is hotly debated.

Charles was recognized for his counter-punching and technical skillset, which enabled him to compete effectively across different weight classes. Although a natural middleweight, he secured victories against notable light-heavyweight and heavyweight opponents during the 1940s.

== Personal life ==
Charles was married to Gladys Charles. The couple had three children, Ezzard Junior, Deborah and Leith. Charles was an avid fan of jazz and played a variety of instruments throughout his life. He also spoke fluent Italian, and even held a short conversation with Rocky Marciano in Italian during a televised interview shortly before their first fight. After his title fights, Charles became very close with Rocky Marciano and later was a neighbor and friend of Muhammad Ali when they both lived on 85th Street in Chicago (later in life when Charles suffered from financial difficulties and illness, both men along with other boxing celebrities hosted a fundraiser on his behalf). Charles also starred in one motion picture: Mau Mau Drums, an independent (and unreleased) jungle-adventure film shot in and around Cincinnati in 1960 by filmmaker Earl Schwieterman.

== Death ==
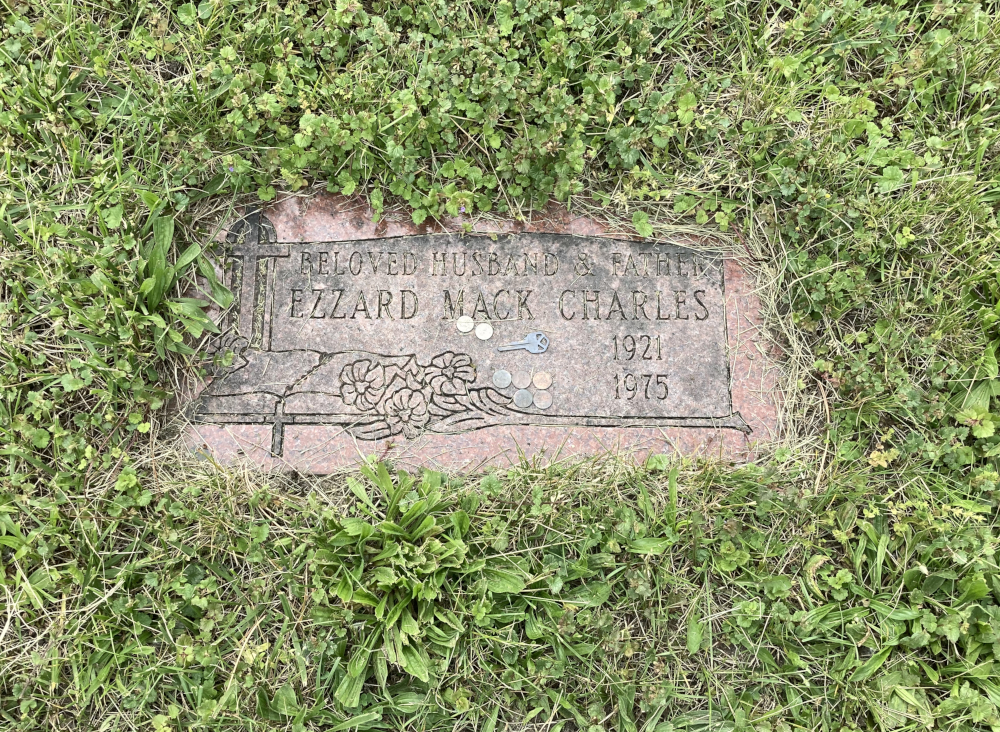
Charles's grave at Burr Oak Cemetery

In 1968, Charles was diagnosed with amyotrophic lateral sclerosis, also known as Lou Gehrig's disease. The disease affected Charles' legs and eventually left him completely disabled. A fundraiser was held to assist Charles and many of his former opponents spoke on his behalf. Rocky Marciano in particular called Charles the bravest man he ever fought. The former boxer spent his last days in a nursing home. A 1973 public service message from the Muscular Dystrophy Association showed Charles in his wheelchair disabled by ALS. Charles died on May 28, 1975, in Chicago. He was buried at Burr Oak Cemetery in Alsip, Illinois.

== Legacy ==
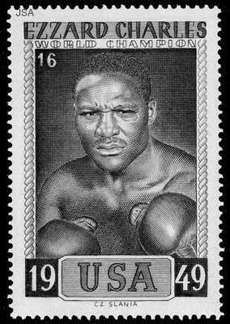
Commemorative stamp honoring Charles

Charles was The Ring magazine Fighter of the Year in 1949 and 1950.

In 1976, Cincinnati honored Charles by changing the name of Lincoln Park Drive to Ezzard Charles Drive. This was the street of his residence at the height of his career.

In 2002, Charles was ranked No. 13 on The Ring magazine's list of the 80 Best Fighters of the Last 80 Years.

Muhammad Ali said in his own autobiography:

"Ezzard Charles was a truly great fighter and champion. He was the only heavyweight champion, other than a young Sonny Liston, who I think would have really troubled me at my best."

In 2007, ESPN online ranks Ezzard Charles as the 27th greatest boxer of all time, ahead of such notable fighters as Mike Tyson, Larry Holmes and Jake LaMotta.

In 2007, prominent boxing historian Bert Sugar listed Charles as the seventh greatest Heavyweight of all time.

In 2009, Boxing magazine listed Ezzard Charles as the greatest Light Heavyweight fighter ever, ahead of the likes of Archie Moore, Bob Foster, Michael Spinks and Gene Tunney.

In 2019, Ezzard Charles was named the 13th greatest pound for pound fighter of all time by the IBRO (International Boxing Research Organisation).

Coming in the 13th position is Ezzard Charles with 200 points. Charles finished 1st at light-heavyweight, in the top 20 at middleweight and in the top 20 at heavyweight. Charles impressive record of opponents; going 3-0 over Archie Moore, 2-0 over Charley Burley, 4-1 against Jimmy Bivins, 3-0 over Joey Maxim as well as 8 successful title defenses at heavyweight prove he was one of boxing’s best. 21 of 31 voters had Charles in the top 20, 7 of those had him in the top 10. Charles finished tied 12-13th last time, so falls in about the same spot as IBRO’s last pound for pound poll.

In 2022, Charles was ranked No. 8 on The Ring magazine's list of the 100 Best Fighters in the history of The Ring magazine's rankings.

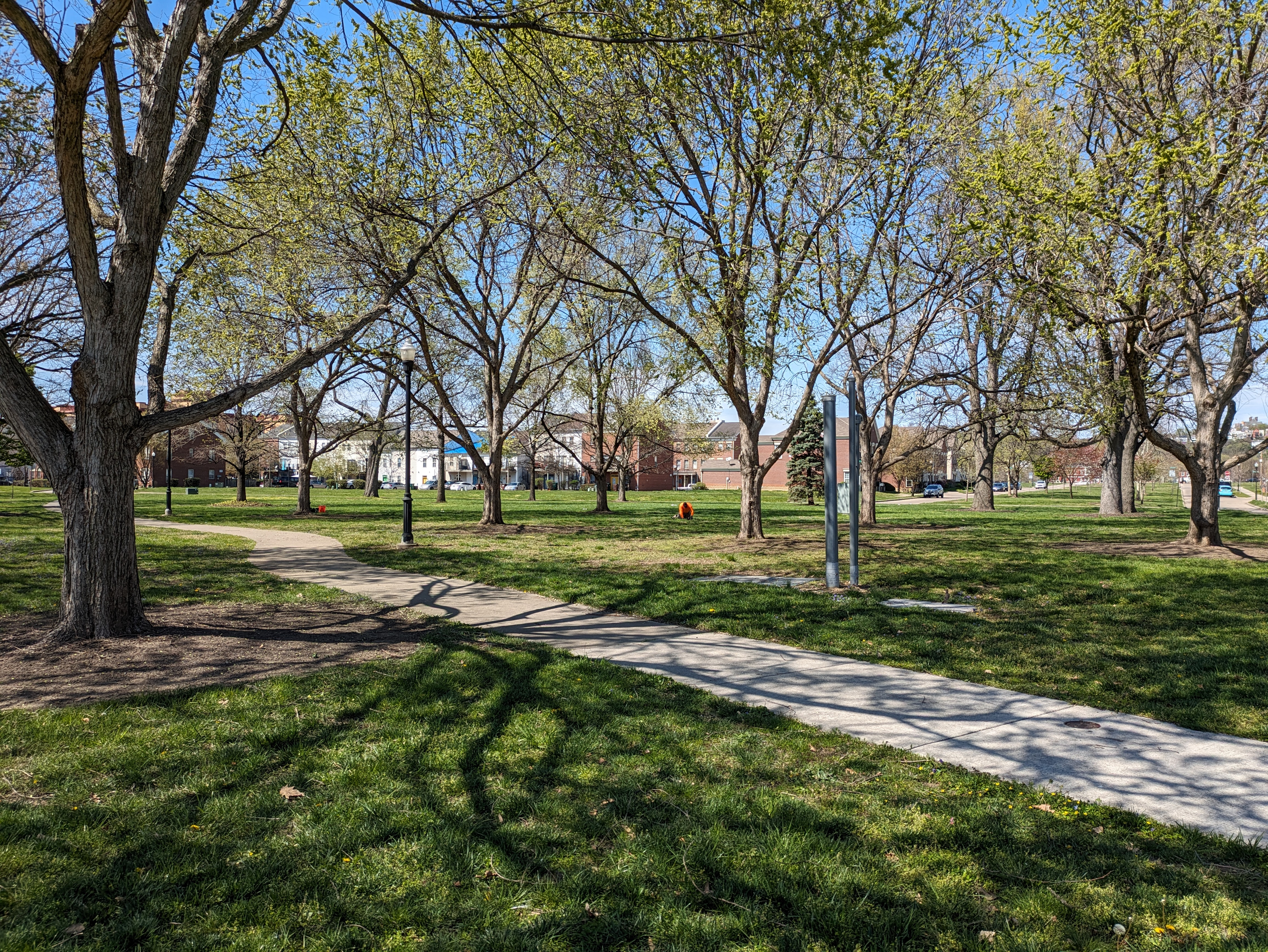
Ezzard Charles Park in Cincinnati

In 2022, a statue honoring Ezzard Charles was unveiled in the former Laurel Park in the West End neighborhood of Cincinnati. The park was renamed to Ezzard Charles Park alongside the unveiling of the statue.

== Professional boxing record ==
121 fights	95 wins	25 losses
By knockout	52	7
By decision	43	17
By disqualification	0	1
Draws	1	

No.	Result	Record	Opponent	Type	Round, time	Date	Location	Notes
121	Loss	95–25–1	Alvin Green	UD	10	Sep 1, 1959	Municipal Auditorium, Oklahoma City, Oklahoma, U.S.	
120	Loss	95–24–1	George Logan	KO	8 (10), 1:50	Jul 30, 1959	Fairgrounds Arena, Boise, Idaho, U.S.	
119	Win	95–23–1	Dave Ashley	TKO	9 (10)	Jul 3, 1959	Lincoln Heights High School, Lincoln Heights, California, U.S.	
118	Loss	94–23–1	Donnie Fleeman	KO	6 (10), 2:13	Oct 27, 1958	Dallas Memorial Auditorium, Dallas, Texas, U.S.	
117	Loss	94–22–1	Alfredo Zuany	UD	10	Sep 30, 1958	Plaza de Toros, Ciudad Juarez, Chihuahua, Mexico	
116	Win	94–21–1	Johnny Harper	UD	10	Aug 28, 1958	East-West Stadium, Fairmont, West Virginia, U.S.	
115	Loss	93–21–1	Dick Richardson	DQ	2 (10)	Oct 2, 1956	Harringay Arena, London, England	
114	Loss	93–20–1	Harry Matthews	UD	10	Aug 31, 1956	Sick's Stadium, Seattle, Washington, U.S.	
113	Loss	93–19–1	Pat McMurtry	UD	10	Jul 13, 1956	Lincoln Bowl, Tacoma, Washington, U.S.	
112	Win	93–18–1	Bob Albright	RTD	6 (10)	Jun 19, 1956	Softball Park, Phoenix, Arizona, U.S.	
111	Loss	92–18–1	Wayne Bethea	UD	10	May 21, 1956	St. Nicholas Arena, New York City, New York, U.S.	
110	Win	92–17–1	Don Jasper	TKO	9 (10), 2:46	Apr 21, 1956	Windsor Arena, Windsor, Ontario, Canada	
109	Loss	91–17–1	Young Jack Johnson	TKO	6 (10)	Dec 29, 1955	Grand Olympic Auditorium, Los Angeles, California, U.S.	
108	Win	91–16–1	Bob Albright	SD	10	Dec 22, 1955	Cow Palace, Daly City, California, U.S.	
107	Win	90–16–1	Toxie Hall	UD	10	Dec 6, 1955	Rochester War Memorial Auditorium, Rochester, New York, U.S.	
106	Loss	89–16–1	Toxie Hall	SD	10	Nov 14, 1955	Rhode Island Auditorium, Providence, Rhode Island, U.S.	
105	Loss	89–15–1	Tommy Jackson	UD	10	Aug 31, 1955	Cleveland Arena, Cleveland, Ohio, U.S.	
104	Loss	89–14–1	Tommy Jackson	UD	10	Aug 3, 1955	War Memorial Auditorium, Syracuse, New York, U.S.	
103	Win	89–13–1	Paul Andrews	SD	10	Jul 13, 1955	Chicago Stadium, Chicago, Illinois, U.S.	
102	Win	88–13–1	John Holman	UD	10	Jun 8, 1955	Music Hall Arena, Cincinnati, Ohio, U.S.	
101	Loss	87–13–1	John Holman	TKO	9 (10), 2:48	Apr 27, 1955	Miami Beach Exhibition Hall, Miami Beach, Florida, U.S.	
100	Win	87–12–1	Vern Escoe	KO	3 (10), 2:15	Apr 11, 1955	Edmonton Gardens, Edmonton, Alberta, Canada	
99	Win	86–12–1	Charley Norkus	UD	10	Feb 18, 1955	Madison Square Garden, New York City, New York, U.S.	
98	Loss	85–12–1	Rocky Marciano	KO	8 (15), 2:36	Sep 17, 1954	Yankee Stadium, New York City, New York, U.S.	For NYSAC, NBA, and The Ring heavyweight titles
97	Loss	85–11–1	Rocky Marciano	UD	15	Jun 17, 1954	Yankee Stadium, New York City, New York, U.S.	For NYSAC, NBA, and The Ring heavyweight titles
96	Win	85–10–1	Bob Satterfield	KO	2 (10)	Jan 13, 1954	Chicago Stadium, Chicago, Illinois, U.S.	
95	Win	84–10–1	Coley Wallace	KO	10 (10), 2:43	Dec 16, 1953	San Francisco Civic Auditorium, San Francisco, California, U.S.	
94	Loss	83–10–1	Harold Johnson	SD	10	Sep 8, 1953	Connie Mack Stadium, Philadelphia, Pennsylvania, U.S.	
93	Loss	83–9–1	Niño Valdés	UD	10	Aug 11, 1953	Miami Beach Exhibition Hall, Miami Beach, Florida, U.S.	
92	Win	83–8–1	Larry Watson	KO	5 (10), 2:50	May 26, 1953	Milwaukee Arena, Milwaukee, Wisconsin, U.S.	
91	Win	82–8–1	Billy Gilliam	UD	10	May 12, 1953	Toledo Sports Arena, Toledo, Ohio, U.S.	
90	Win	81–8–1	Rex Layne	UD	10	Apr 1, 1953	Winterland Arena, San Francisco, California, U.S.	
89	Win	80–8–1	Tommy Harrison	TKO	9 (10)	Feb 4, 1953	Olympia Stadium, Detroit, Michigan, U.S.	
88	Win	79–8–1	Wes Bascom	TKO	9 (10), 2:34	Jan 14, 1953	St. Louis Arena, St. Louis, Missouri, U.S.	
87	Win	78–8–1	Frank Buford	TKO	7 (10), 2:13	Dec 15, 1952	Boston Garden, Boston, Massachusetts, U.S.	
86	Win	77–8–1	Jimmy Bivins	UD	10	Nov 26, 1952	Chicago Stadium, Chicago, Illinois, U.S.	
85	Win	76–8–1	Cesar Brion	UD	10	Oct 24, 1952	Madison Square Garden, New York City, New York, U.S.	
84	Win	75–8–1	Bernie Reynolds	KO	2 (12), 1:40	Oct 8, 1952	Cincinnati Gardens, Cincinnati, Ohio, U.S.	
83	Loss	74–8–1	Rex Layne	PTS	10	Aug 8, 1952	Ogden Stadium, Ogden, Utah, U.S.	
82	Loss	74–7–1	Jersey Joe Walcott	UD	15	Jun 5, 1952	Philadelphia Municipal Stadium, Philadelphia, Pennsylvania, U.S.	For NYSAC, NBA, and The Ring heavyweight titles
81	Win	74–6–1	Joe Kahut	KO	8 (12), 1:40	Dec 12, 1951	Pacific Livestock Pavilion, Portland, Oregon, U.S.	
80	Win	73–6–1	Joey Maxim	UD	12	Dec 12, 1951	Cow Palace, Daly City, California, U.S.	
79	Win	72–6–1	Rex Layne	TKO	11 (12)	Oct 10, 1951	Forbes Field, Pittsburgh, Pennsylvania, U.S.	
78	Loss	71–6–1	Jersey Joe Walcott	KO	7 (15), 0:55	Jul 18, 1951	Forbes Field, Pittsburgh, Pennsylvania, U.S.	Lost NYSAC, NBA, and The Ring heavyweight titles
77	Win	71–5–1	Joey Maxim	UD	15	May 30, 1951	Chicago Stadium, Chicago, Illinois, U.S.	Retained NYSAC, NBA, and The Ring heavyweight titles
76	Win	70–5–1	Jersey Joe Walcott	UD	15	Mar 7, 1951	Olympia Stadium, Detroit, Michigan, U.S.	Retained NYSAC, NBA, and The Ring heavyweight titles
75	Win	69–5–1	Lee Oma	TKO	10 (15), 1:19	Jan 12, 1951	Madison Square Garden, New York City, New York, U.S.	Retained NYSAC, NBA, and The Ring heavyweight titles
74	Win	68–5–1	Nick Barone	KO	11 (15), 2:06	Dec 5, 1950	Cincinnati Gardens, Cincinnati, Ohio, U.S.	Retained NYSAC, NBA, and The Ring heavyweight titles
73	Win	67–5–1	Joe Louis	UD	15	Sep 27, 1950	Yankee Stadium, New York City, New York, U.S.	Retained NBA heavyweight title; Won vacant NYSAC and The Ring heavyweight titles
72	Win	66–5–1	Freddie Beshore	TKO	14 (15), 2:53	Aug 15, 1950	Buffalo Memorial Auditorium, Buffalo, New York, U.S.	Retained NBA heavyweight title
71	Win	65–5–1	Pat Valentino	KO	8 (15), 0:35	Oct 14, 1949	Cow Palace, Daly City, California, U.S.	Retained NBA heavyweight title
70	Win	64–5–1	Gus Lesnevich	RTD	7 (15)	Aug 10, 1949	Yankee Stadium, New York City, New York, U.S.	Retained NBA heavyweight title
69	Win	63–5–1	Jersey Joe Walcott	UD	15	Jun 22, 1949	Comiskey Park, Chicago, Illinois, U.S.	Won vacant NBA heavyweight title
68	Win	62–5–1	Joey Maxim	MD	15	Feb 28, 1949	Cincinnati Gardens, Cincinnati, Ohio, U.S.	
67	Win	61–5–1	Johnny Haynes	KO	8 (10)	Feb 7, 1949	Philadelphia Arena, Philadelphia, Pennsylvania, U.S.	
66	Win	60–5–1	Joe Baksi	TKO	11 (15), 2:33	Dec 10, 1948	Madison Square Garden, New York City, New York, U.S.	
65	Win	59–5–1	Walter Hafer	KO	7 (10)	Nov 15, 1948	Cincinnati Music Hall, Cincinnati, Ohio, U.S.	
64	Win	58–5–1	Jimmy Bivins	UD	10	Sep 13, 1948	Griffith Stadium, Washington, D.C., U.S.	
63	Win	57–5–1	Erv Sarlin	UD	10	May 20, 1948	Buffalo Memorial Auditorium, Buffalo, New York, U.S.	
62	Win	56–5–1	Elmer Ray	KO	9 (10), 2:43	May 7, 1948	Chicago Stadium, Chicago, Illinois, U.S.	
61	Win	55–5–1	Sam Baroudi	KO	10 (10)	Feb 20, 1948	Chicago Stadium, Chicago, Illinois, U.S.	Baroudi died of injuries sustained in the fight.
60	Win	54–5–1	Archie Moore	KO	8 (15), 2:40	Jan 13, 1948	Cleveland Arena, Cleveland, Ohio, U.S.	
59	Win	53–5–1	Fitzie Fitzpatrick	KO	4 (12), 1:34	Dec 2, 1947	Cleveland Arena, Cleveland, Ohio, U.S.	
58	Win	52–5–1	Teddy Randolph	UD	10	Nov 3, 1947	Buffalo Memorial Auditorium, Buffalo, New York, U.S.	
57	Win	51–5–1	Clarence Jones	KO	1 (10), 2:41	Oct 27, 1947	Radio Center Arena, Huntington, West Virginia, U.S.	
56	Win	50–5–1	Al Smith	TKO	4 (10), 1:11	Oct 16, 1947	Armory, Akron, Ohio, U.S.	
55	Win	49–5–1	Lloyd Marshall	KO	2 (10), 2:25	Sep 29, 1947	Crosley Field, Cincinnati, Ohio, U.S.	
54	Win	48–5–1	Joe Matisi	UD	10	Sep 16, 1947	Buffalo Memorial Auditorium, Buffalo, New York, U.S.	
53	Loss	47–5–1	Elmer Ray	SD	10	Jul 25, 1947	Madison Square Garden, New York City, New York, U.S.	
52	Win	47–4–1	Fitzie Fitzpatrick	KO	5 (10), 2:43	Jul 14, 1947	Crosley Field, Cincinnati, Ohio, U.S.	
51	Win	46–4–1	Archie Moore	MD	10	May 5, 1947	Cincinnati Music Hall, Cincinnati, Ohio, U.S.	
50	Win	45–4–1	Erv Sarlin	UD	10	Apr 14, 1947	Duquesne Gardens, Pittsburgh, Pennsylvania, U.S.	
49	Win	44–4–1	Jimmy Bivins	KO	4 (10), 1:17	Mar 10, 1947	Cleveland Arena, Cleveland, Ohio, U.S.	
48	Win	43–4–1	Oakland Billy Smith	KO	5 (12), 1:38	Feb 17, 1947	Cincinnati Music Hall, Cincinnati, Ohio, U.S.	
47	Win	42–4–1	Jimmy Bivins	UD	10	Nov 12, 1946	Duquesne Gardens, Pittsburgh, Pennsylvania, U.S.	
46	Win	41–4–1	Oakland Billy Smith	UD	10	Sep 23, 1946	Cincinnati Music Hall, Cincinnati, Ohio, U.S.	
45	Win	40–4–1	Lloyd Marshall	KO	6 (10), 0:57	Jul 29, 1946	Crosley Field, Cincinnati, Ohio, U.S.	
44	Win	39–4–1	Shelton Bell	KO	5 (10), 2:24	Jun 13, 1946	Idora Park, Youngstown, Ohio, U.S.	
43	Win	38–4–1	Archie Moore	UD	10	May 20, 1946	Forbes Field, Pittsburgh, Pennsylvania, U.S.	
42	Win	37–4–1	Tommy Hubert	KO	4 (10), 1:49	May 13, 1946	Cincinnati Music Hall, Cincinnati, Ohio, U.S.	
41	Win	36–4–1	George Parks	TKO	6 (10)	Apr 15, 1946	Duquesne Gardens, Pittsburgh, Pennsylvania, U.S.	
40	Win	35–4–1	Billy Duncan	KO	4 (10), 1:27	Apr 1, 1946	Duquesne Gardens, Pittsburgh, Pennsylvania, U.S.	
39	Win	34–4–1	Tommy Hubert	UD	10	Mar 25, 1946	Music Hall Arena, Cincinnati, Ohio, U.S.	
38	Win	33–4–1	Al Sheridan	KO	2 (10), 2:57	Feb 18, 1946	Music Hall Arena, Cincinnati, Ohio, U.S.	
37	Win	32–4–1	Al Barlow	PTS	3	Dec 16, 1944	Brancaccio Theater, Esquilino, Rome, Italy	Won Inter-Allied light heavyweight title
36	Win	31–4–1	Stanley Goicz	PTS	3	Dec 13, 1944	Brancaccio Theater, Esquilino, Rome, Italy	
35	Loss	30–4–1	Lloyd Marshall	TKO	8 (10), 0:25	Mar 31, 1943	Cleveland Arena, Cleveland, Ohio, U.S.	
34	Loss	30–3–1	Jimmy Bivins	UD	10	Jan 7, 1943	Cleveland Arena, Cleveland, Ohio, U.S.	
33	Win	30–2–1	Joey Maxim	UD	10	Dec 1, 1942	Cleveland Arena, Cleveland, Ohio, U.S.	
32	Win	29–2–1	Joey Maxim	UD	10	Oct 27, 1942	Duquesne Gardens, Pittsburgh, Pennsylvania, U.S.	
31	Win	28–2–1	Mose Brown	KO	6 (10), 2:51	Sep 15, 1942	Forbes Field, Pittsburgh, Pennsylvania, U.S.	
30	Win	27–2–1	Jose Basora	KO	5 (10), 2:57	Aug 17, 1942	Hickey Park, Millvale, Pennsylvania, U.S.	
29	Win	26–2–1	Booker Beckwith	KO	9 (10), 2:19	Jul 27, 1942	Forbes Field, Pittsburgh, Pennsylvania, U.S.	
28	Win	25–2–1	Steve Mamakos	KO	1 (10), 2:46	Jul 14, 1942	Crosley Field, Cincinnati, Ohio, U.S.	
27	Win	24–2–1	Charley Burley	PTS	10	Jun 29, 1942	Hickey Park, Millvale, Pennsylvania, U.S.	
26	Win	23–2–1	Charley Burley	UD	10	May 25, 1942	Forbes Field, Pittsburgh, Pennsylvania, U.S.	
25	Loss	22–2–1	Kid Tunero	SD	10	May 13, 1942	Music Hall Arena, Cincinnati, Ohio, U.S.	
24	Win	22–1–1	Billy Pryor	PTS	10	Apr 8, 1942	Music Hall Arena, Cincinnati, Ohio, U.S.	
23	Draw	21–1–1	Ken Overlin	MD	10	Mar 2, 1942	Music Hall Arena, Cincinnati, Ohio, U.S.	
22	Win	21–1	Anton Christoforidis	TKO	3 (10), 2:42	Jan 12, 1942	Music Hall Arena, Cincinnati, Ohio, U.S.	
21	Win	20–1	Teddy Yarosz	UD	10	Nov 17, 1941	Music Hall Arena, Cincinnati, Ohio, U.S.	
20	Win	19–1	Pat Mangini	KO	1 (10), 2:50	Oct 13, 1941	Parkway Arena, Cincinnati, Ohio, U.S.	
19	Win	18–1	Al Gilbert	TKO	5 (10), 3:00	Jul 21, 1941	Parkway Arena, Cincinnati, Ohio, U.S.	
18	Loss	17–1	Ken Overlin	UD	10	Jun 9, 1941	Crosley Field, Cincinnati, Ohio, U.S.	
17	Win	17–0	Rudy Kozole	PTS	10	May 12, 1941	Music Hall Arena, Cincinnati, Ohio, U.S.	
16	Win	16–0	Joe Sutka	PTS	10	Mar 31, 1941	Music Hall Arena, Cincinnati, Ohio, U.S.	
15	Win	15–0	Floyd Howard	KO	7 (10)	Mar 10, 1941	Music Hall Arena, Cincinnati, Ohio, U.S.	
14	Win	14–0	Slaka Cavrich	KO	2 (10)	Feb 24, 1941	Music Hall Arena, Cincinnati, Ohio, U.S.	
13	Win	13–0	Billy Bengal	UD	10	Feb 10, 1941	Music Hall Arena, Cincinnati, Ohio, U.S.	
12	Win	12–0	Charley Jerome	KO	3 (10)	Dec 2, 1940	Music Hall Arena, Cincinnati, Ohio, U.S.	
11	Win	11–0	Marty Simmons	PTS	10	Oct 1, 1940	Music Hall Arena, Cincinnati, Ohio, U.S.	
10	Win	10–0	Billy Hood	KO	2 (10)	Sep 23, 1940	Music Hall Arena, Cincinnati, Ohio, U.S.	
9	Win	9–0	John Reeves	PTS	4	Aug 5, 1940	Haft's Acre, Columbus, Ohio, U.S.	
8	Win	8–0	Carl Turner	PTS	6	Jun 29, 1940	Parkway Arena, Cincinnati, Ohio, U.S.	
7	Win	7–0	Young Kid Ash	KO	3 (6), 1:20	Jun 17, 1940	Legion Hall, Portsmouth, Ohio, U.S.	
6	Win	6–0	Frankie Williams	TKO	5 (8), 3:00	Jun 13, 1940	Parkway Arena, Cincinnati, Ohio, U.S.	
5	Win	5–0	Charley Banks	KO	1 (6), 1:42	Jun 3, 1940	Cincinnati Music Hall, Cincinnati, Ohio, U.S.	
4	Win	4–0	Charley Banks	PTS	6	May 20, 1940	Cincinnati Music Hall, Cincinnati, Ohio, U.S.	
3	Win	3–0	Remo Fernandez	PTS	6	Apr 3, 1940	Cincinnati Music Hall, Cincinnati, Ohio, U.S.	
2	Win	2–0	John Reeves	PTS	6	Mar 27, 1940	Cincinnati Music Hall, Cincinnati, Ohio, U.S.	
1	Win	1–0	Melody Johnson	KO	4 (4)	Mar 12, 1940	Armory, Middletown, Ohio, U.S.	

== Titles in boxing ==
=== Major world titles ===
- NYSAC heavyweight champion (200+ lbs)
- NBA (WBA) heavyweight champion (200+ lbs)

=== The Ring magazine titles ===
- The Ring heavyweight champion (200+ lbs)

=== Regional/International titles ===
- Inter-Allied light heavyweight champion (Note: Not to be confused with the Inter-Allied Games held in 1919.) (175 lbs)

=== Undisputed titles ===
- Undisputed heavyweight champion

== See also ==
- List of heavyweight boxing champions

== Notes and references ==
=== References ===
Sporting positions
World boxing titles
Vacant Title last held by Joe Louis	NBA heavyweight champion June 22, 1949 – July 18, 1951	Succeeded by Jersey Joe Walcott
Vacant Title last held by Joe Louis	NYSAC heavyweight champion September 27, 1950 – July 18, 1951	Succeeded by Jersey Joe Walcott
Vacant Title last held by Joe Louis	The Ring heavyweight champion September 27, 1950 – July 18, 1951	Succeeded by Jersey Joe Walcott
Vacant Title last held by Joe Louis	Undisputed heavyweight champion September 27, 1950 – July 18, 1951	Succeeded by Jersey Joe Walcott
