= United States national amateur boxing championships =

Boxing competitions

The United States National Boxing Championships bestow the title of United States Champion on Olympic boxers for winning the annual national Olympic boxing tournament organized by USA Boxing, which is the national governing body for Olympic boxing and is the United States' member organization of the World Boxing (since 2023; had been a member of the Association Internationale de Boxe (AIBA) until departing because of corruption in the governing body).

USA Boxing comprises 56 Local Boxing Committees, which are currently grouped into 14 geographical regions (previously in 1970s and 1980s they were divided into 22 AAU regions represented in the national's, each carrying a team of 11 boxers, with each being a Region tournament winner.) These LBCs, along with the coaches, athletes, and officials, form the backbone of USA Boxing and Olympic-style boxing in the United States. USA Boxing's athlete membership comprises both male and female boxers.

The national Olympic boxing championships now sponsored by USA Boxing are titled United States National Boxing Championships and were formerly the AAU Boxing championship.

Current Weight classes

- Light flyweight (106 pounds)
- Flyweight (112 pounds)
- Bantamweight (119 pounds)
- Featherweight (125 pounds)
- Lightweight (132 pounds)
- Light welterweight (141 pounds)
- Welterweight (152 pounds)
- Middleweight (165 pounds)
- Light heavyweight (178 pounds)
- Heavyweight (201 pounds)
- Super heavyweight (+201 pounds)

== US Amateur National Championships ==
Below are the lists of the sanctioned USA National Tournaments, by Jr and open division:

=== Jr. Division ===
- National Silver Gloves
- National Jr. Golden Gloves
- National Jr. Olympics

=== Open Division ===
- National USA Amateur Championships
- National U-19 Amateur Championships
- National Golden Gloves
- National PAL Championships

== US Champions ==
Below are the lists of the national champions, by division:

- National Amateur Super Heavyweight Champions
- National Amateur Heavyweight Champions
- National Amateur Light Heavyweight Champions
- National Amateur Middleweight Champions
- National Amateur Light Middleweight Champions
- National Amateur Welterweight Champions
- National Amateur Light Welterweight Champions
- National Amateur Lightweight Champions
- National Amateur Featherweight Champions
- National Amateur Bantamweight Champions
- National Amateur Flyweight Champions
- National Amateur Light Flyweight Champions
