= Martin Pierce =

English wood carver

Martin Pierce is a wood carver and furniture and hardware designer born in Worcester, England. It was here he began his career as a wood carver, working for businesses and churches in the surrounding area. He has been a resident of Los Angeles since 1980 and, during this period has developed several unique styles of furniture, which include his signature Hedgerow dining chair and Hedgerow bed. Other unique furniture styles include the Ascot and Seicho lines. Many of these pieces are japanned, or gilded, with vines and aspen trees and are part of a limited edition that is both numbered and signed.

In 2004, Martin Pierce began work on an extensive range of cabinet and door hardware which includes the Willow, Ergo, Netsuke and Hedgerow styles. These collections are all cast using the lost wax casting method and are cast primarily in silicon bronze although the Ergo and Morphic styles are cast in 316 stainless steel.

== Techniques ==
In the Ascot buffet, armoire and tallboy, Martin Pierce uses gold and silver leaf to create scenes that appear three-dimensional. The technique he uses is one that combines aspects of japanning with gilding. In England in the 17th and 18th century, japanning became very popular and it was used extensively to decorate furniture with raised scenes of birds, flowers and pagodas. At that time, a type of glue called sizing and whitening were applied in successive layers onto a wood surface, which was then blackened or colored before being varnished and polished. Designs were then traced onto the prepared background where they were either decorated by color or with gold. The artisans would add further interest to these scenes by raising the decorated areas. This was accomplished by applying a thick compound of sawdust, whitening and gum Arabic.

Martin Pierce has borrowed much from the technique of japanning and the style of Chinoiserie but he brought them into a modern context, substituting easier mediums for the traditional varnish, size and gum Arabic. Since Martin Pierce creates his designs over a beautiful background of walnut or English brown oak wood, he does not blacken or hide the wood. Martin likes the raised textural nature of japanning, but he substitutes casein, which is a white paste made from milk by-products for its 17th-century cousin. Casein is easily applied either as a thick coat with a hand trowel or, for delicate thin leaf stems, with a fine brush. Casein has the advantage of drying quickly and affords a soft enough surface that can be sanded smooth with 220-grit sandpaper. Martin applies successive coats of casein until the design is sufficiently raised and then seals it with a water-based lacquer.

In traditional gilding, the gilder applies his gold over a surface of firm clay that provides a solid surface that he can burnish and thereby make the gold very bright and brassy. Martin Pierce omits this step, as he feels the gold and silver are sufficiently iridescent and because he prefers a more muted appearance. He also substitutes a modern product called wonder size for the traditional gold size, as he also prefers its cold application making it easier to control. Once the size is dry, he carefully applies the wafer thin gold which he presses down into place and carefully rubs with fine wax paper.

Now the real art work begins as he applies different colored glazes over the gold scene. The glaze is made from a mixture of oil paint diluted with paint thinner, and the glazes vary in consistency depending on how much of the gold Martin wants to expose. Martin also uses water spotting to create a natural age to his leaves and stems, which dulls down their pristine appearance. Each of these pieces is signed, numbered, and dated and forms part of a limited edition available through Martin Pierce, or through a design professional.
