= USA Boxing =

Governing body for Olympic-style boxing in the United States

- Formation: 1978
- Type: National governing body (NGB)
- Headquarters: Colorado Springs, Colorado, U.S.
- Region served: United States
- Affiliations: USOPC and World Boxing
- Website: www.usaboxing.org

USA Boxing is the national governing body for Olympic-style boxing. It is overseen by the United States Olympic Committee and World Boxing, which sets its rules.

Headquartered in Colorado Springs, Colorado, USA Boxing is a non-profit organization responsible for the administration, development and promotion of Olympic-style boxing in the United States.

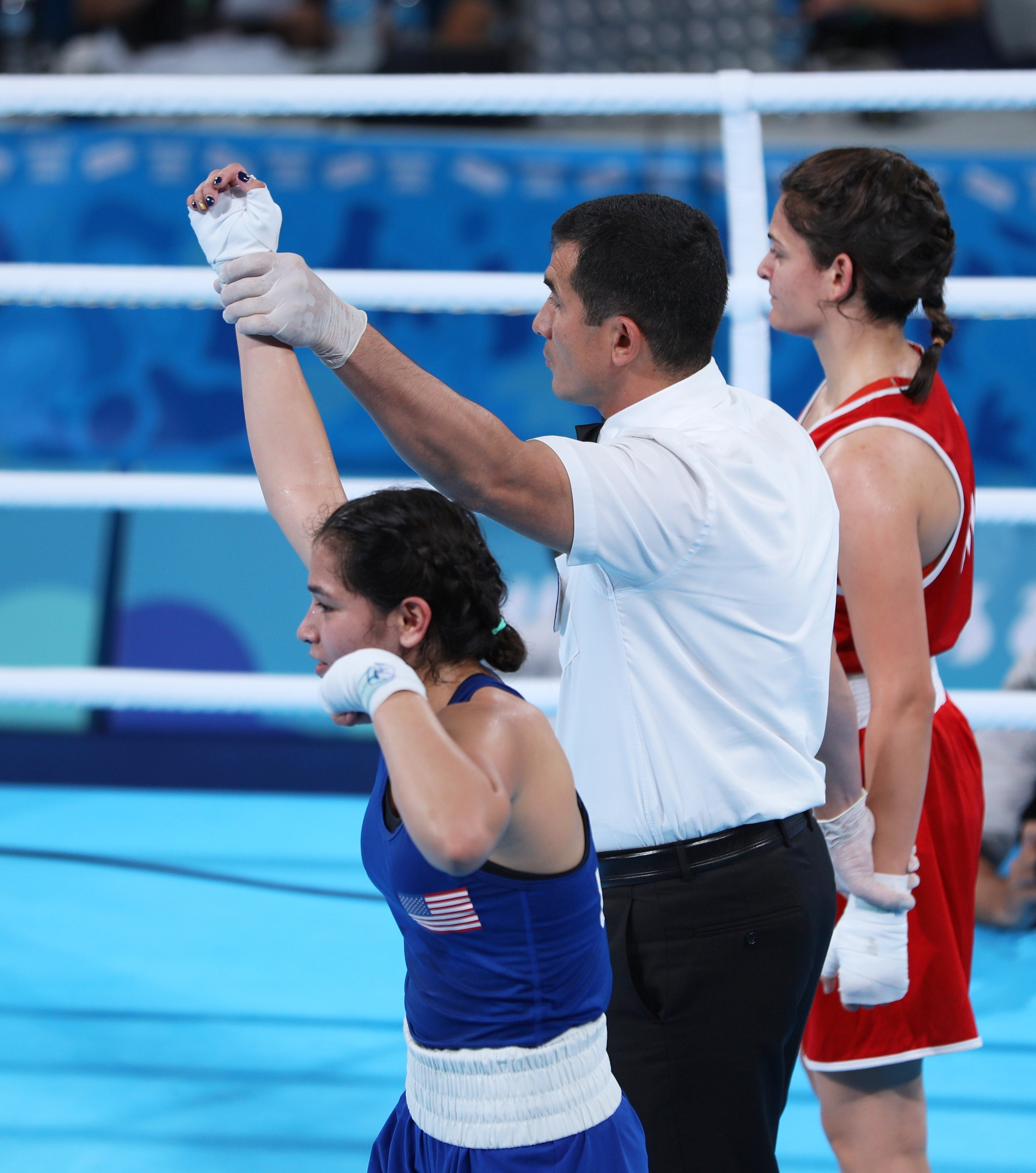
Bronze Medal Bout of the girls' −51 kg (flyweight) at the 2018 Summer Youth Olympics in Buenos Aires on October 18, 2018: United States vs. Bulgaria.

USA Boxing comprises 56 Local Boxing Committees, which are grouped into 13 geographical regions. These LBCs, along with the coaches, athletes, and officials, form the backbone of USA Boxing and Olympic-style boxing in the United States. Boxing facilities, coaches, officials and athletes may be affiliated with USA Boxing, with athletes receiving an official "passbook" to be presented and marked at all sanctioned events. Athletes are classified according to age, gender and weight, with boxers younger than seventeen known as "juniors" and those thirty-five or older known as "masters".

== History ==
USA Boxing, formerly known as the United States Amateur Boxing Federation, has governed amateur and Olympic boxing in the United States since 1978. USA Boxing officially recognized women's boxing in 1993, becoming the first organization to do so in the world, and sanctioned a fight between Dallas Malloy & Heather Poyner in Lynwood, Washington. In 2022, the organization made some policy updates, which granted transgender athletes the ability to compete in sanctioned events; upon completing specific requirements.

The national boxing championships are sponsored by USA Boxing and titled the United States Championships, formerly the AAU (Amateur Athletic Union) Boxing Championships. The Championships would crown a United States Amateur Champion in each of the sanctioned weight classes.

USA Boxing previously organized the USA Knockouts team in the World Series of Boxing.

In February 2023, USA Boxing announced its decision to boycott the 2023 World Championships (organized by the International Boxing Association) where Russian and Belarusian athletes will compete with no restrictions, also accusing the IBA of attempting to sabotage IOC-approved qualification pathway for the 2024 Summer Olympics. Poland, Switzerland, the Netherlands, Great Britain, Ireland, Czechia, Sweden and Canada later joined the U.S. USA Boxing co-founded World Boxing as a direct rival to the IBA, and it was launched in April 2023.

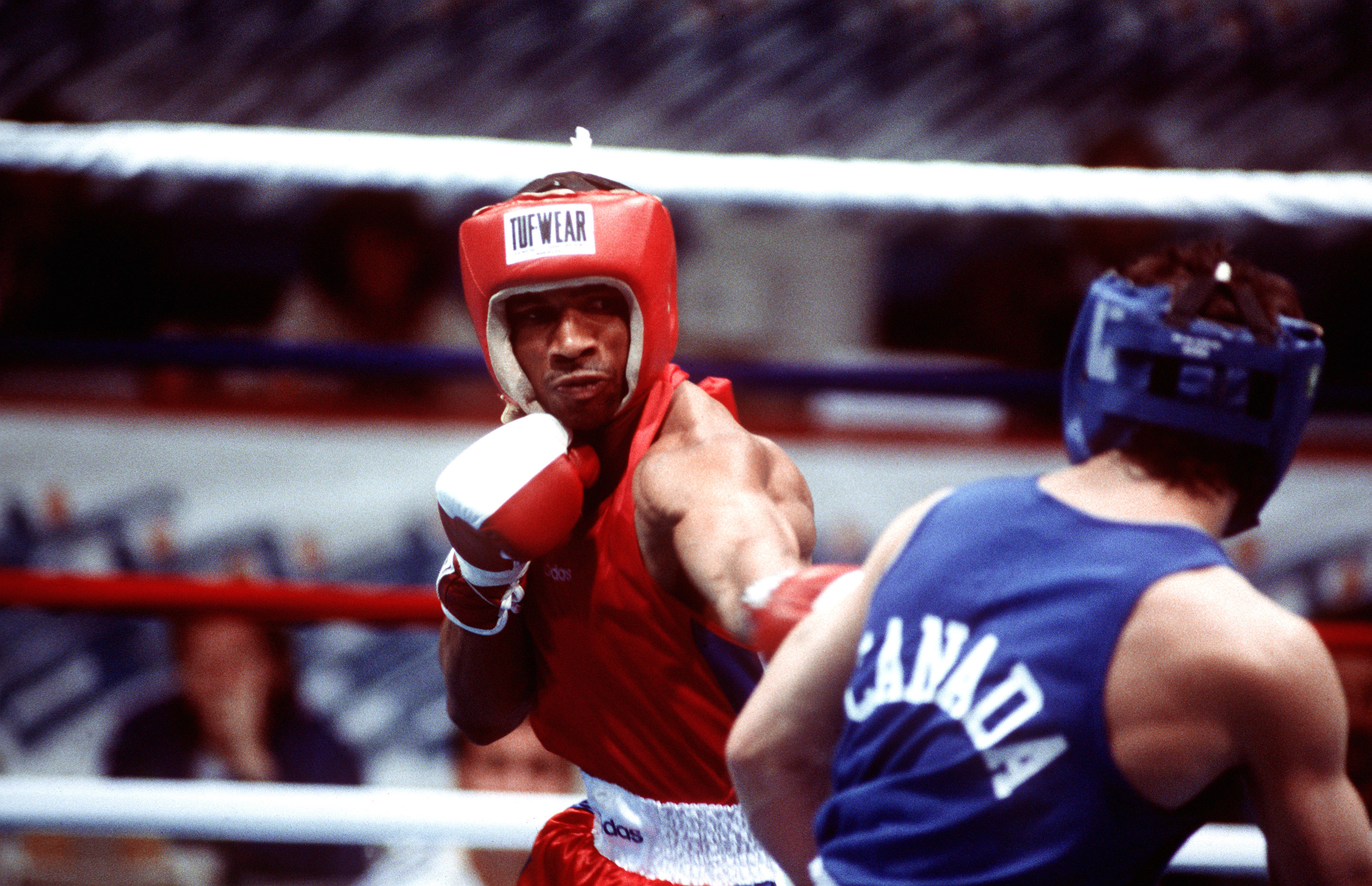
Ron Simms fights his first match of the Pan American Games held at Club Athletico Once Unidos against Canadian Peter Pestowka

== Weight classes ==
Weight Classes – Elite Men

- Light flyweight (106 pounds, 48 kg)
- Flyweight (112 pounds, 51 kg)
- Bantamweight (119 pounds, 54 kg)
- Featherweight (125 pounds, 57 kg)
- Lightweight (132 pounds, 60 kg)
- Light welterweight (141 pounds, 64 kg)
- Welterweight (152 pounds, 69 kg)
- Middleweight (165 pounds, 75 kg)
- Light heavyweight (178 pounds, 81 kg)
- Heavyweight (201 pounds, 91 kg)
- Super heavyweight (201+ pounds, 91+ kg)

Weight Classes – Elite Women

- Light flyweight (106 pounds, 48 kg)
- Flyweight (112 pounds, 51 kg) – Olympic Weight Class
- Bantamweight (119 pounds, 54 kg)
- Featherweight (125 pounds, 57 kg)
- Lightweight (132 pounds, 60 kg) – Olympic Weight Class
- Light welterweight (141 pounds, 64 kg)
- Welterweight (152 pounds, 69 kg)
- Middleweight (165 pounds, 75 kg) – Olympic Weight Class
- Light heavyweight (178 pounds, 81 kg)
- Heavyweight (178+ pounds, 81+ kg)

== National Amateur Champions ==
Below are the lists of the national amateur champions, by division:

- National Amateur Super Heavyweight Champions
- National Amateur Heavyweight Champions
- National Amateur Light Heavyweight Champions
- National Amateur Middleweight Champions
- National Amateur Light Middleweight Champions
- National Amateur Welterweight Champions
- National Amateur Light Welterweight Champions
- National Amateur Lightweight Champions
- National Amateur Featherweight Champions
- National Amateur Bantamweight Champions
- National Amateur Flyweight Champions
- National Amateur Light Flyweight Champions

== See also ==
- Association of Boxing Commissions
