= Nick Barone =

American boxer (1926–2006)

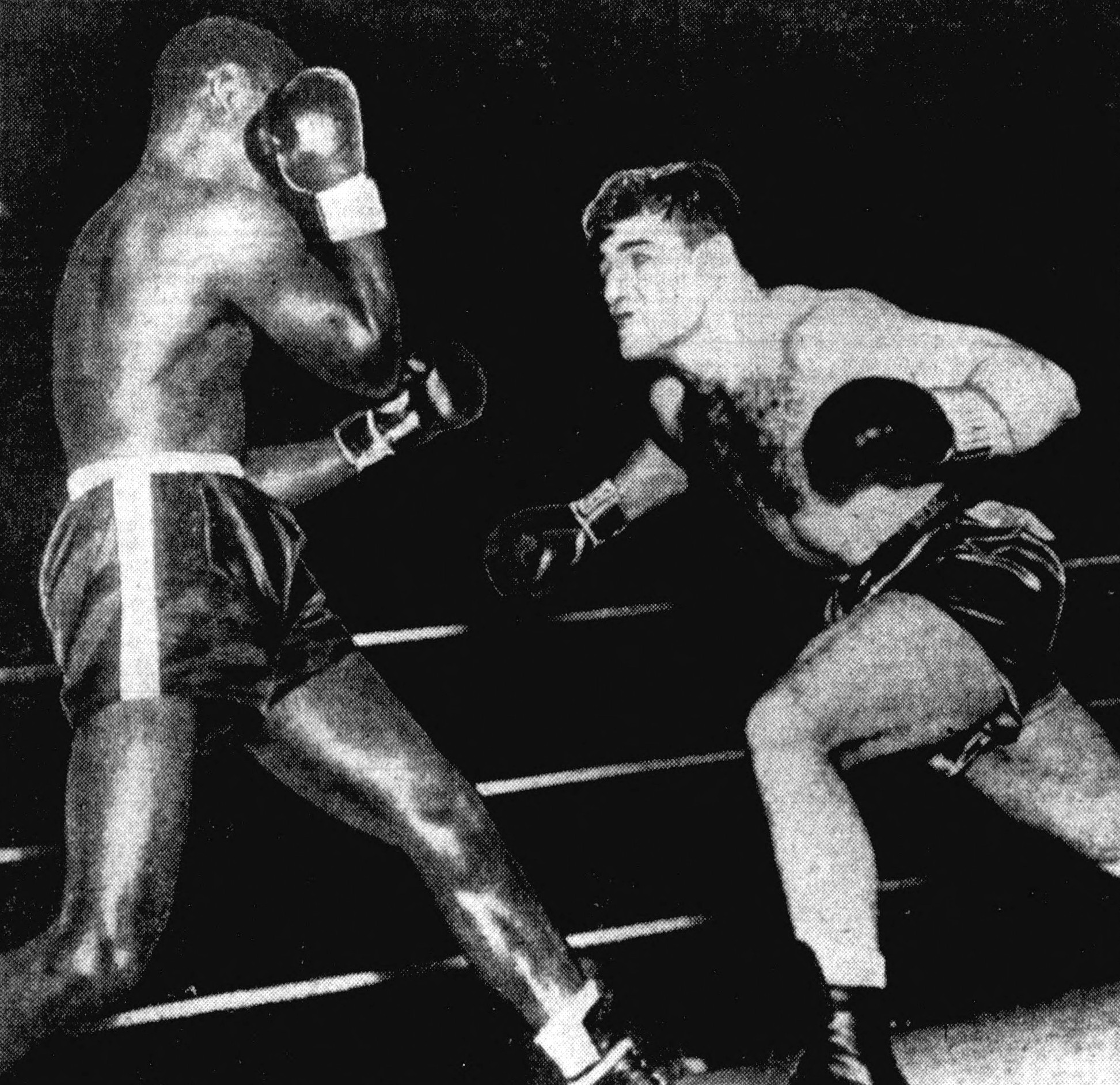
- Nick Barone (right) during his 1950 NBA title fight against champion Ezzard Charles (left)

Personal information
- Nickname: Fighting Florist
- Nationality: American
- Born: Carmen Barone; June 12, 1926 Syracuse, New York, U.S.
- Died: March 12, 2006 (aged 79)
- Height: 1.75 m (5 ft 9 in)
- Weight: Light heavyweight

Boxing career
- Stance: Orthodox

Boxing record
- Total fights: 57
- Wins: 44
- Win by KO: 21
- Losses: 12
- Draws: 1

Carmen "Nick" Barone (June 12, 1926 – March 12, 2006) was an American professional boxer, who was ranked in the light heavyweight division from 1949-1951. Nicknamed the "Fighting Florist,", Barone is best known for his 1950 NBA title fight against Ezzard Charles at the Cincinnati Gardens.

During World War II, at the age of 16, Barone joined the United States Marine Corps using his brother's name. He fought in the Battle of Iwo Jima.
