= LeChaunce Shepherd =

American boxer

Personal information
- Born: August 22, 1974 (age 51) Milwaukee, Wisconsin, United States

Sport
- Sport: Boxing
Medal record
Representing United States
Pan American Games
Bronze medal – third place	1999 Winnipeg	Welterweight

LeChaunce Shepherd (born August 22, 1974) is an American former boxer. He is a two time amateur national champion.

== Amateur highlights ==
- 1996 U.S. Olympic Trials at Light Welterweight, eliminated by David Diaz on points
- 1997 United States Amateur Welterweight Champion
- 1999 3rd place as a Welterweight at United States Amateur Championships. Results were:
  - Defeated Ramon Olivas on points
  - Defeated James Webb on points
  - Lost to Arturo Morales on points
- 1999 2nd place as a Welterweight at National Golden Gloves. Results were:
  - Defeated Arturo Morales on points
  - Defeated Mike Balasi on points
  - Defeated Bobby Joe Valdez on points
  - Defeated James Webb on points
  - Lost to Dante Craig on points
- 1999 Welterweight Bronze Medalist at Pan-American Games in Winnipeg, Canada. Results were:
  - Defeated Isaac Caballero (Nicaragua) TKO 1
  - Defeated Espitia Calderon (Colombia) on points
  - Lost to Juan Hernandez Sierra (Cuba) on points
- 2000 United States Amateur Welterweight Champion
- 2000 Olympic Trials as a Welterweight, lost to Dante Craig

== Professional career ==
Shepherd turned pro in 2000 and had success. He walked away from boxing in 2002 with a record of 4 wins and 1 loss.
