= Rocky Marciano vs. Jersey Joe Walcott II =

Boxing match

- Date: May 15, 1953
- Venue: Chicago Stadium, Chicago, Illinois, U.S.
- Title(s) on the line: NYSAC, NBA and The Ring undisputed heavyweight championship

Tale of the tape
Boxer	Rocky Marciano	Jersey Joe Walcott
Nickname	"The Brockton Blockbuster"	
Hometown	Brockton, Massachusetts, U.S.	Pennsauken Township, New Jersey, U.S.
Pre-fight record	43–0 (38 KO)	49–19–1 (31 KO)
Age	29 years, 8 months	39 years, 3 months
Height	5 ft 10 in (178 cm)	6 ft 0 in (183 cm)
Weight	184 1/2 lb (84 kg)	197 3/4 lb (90 kg)
Style	Orthodox	Orthodox
Recognition	NYSAC, NBA, and The Ring; Undisputed Heavyweight Champion	NBA/The Ring; No. 1 Ranked Heavyweight; Former heavyweight champion

Result
- Marciano defeats Walcott by 1st round KO

Rocky Marciano vs. Jersey Joe Walcott II was a professional boxing match contested on May 15, 1953, for the undisputed heavyweight championship.

== Background ==
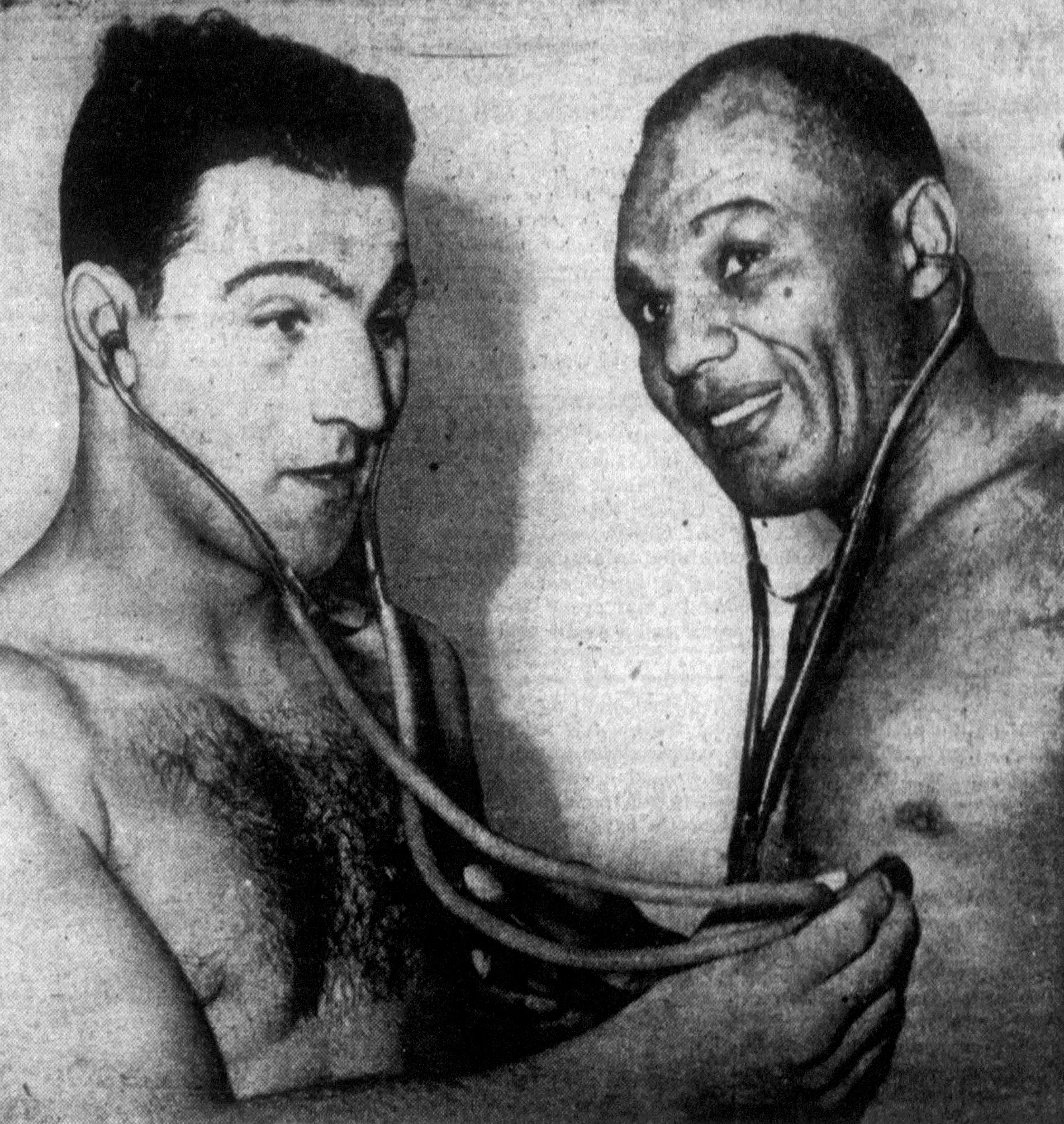
Marciano (left) and Walcott (right) before their rematch in 1953.

On 21 September 1952 Rocky Marciano had won the undisputed heavyweight championship of world by stopping champion Jersey Joe Walcott in the 13th round after a hard-fought bout with Walcott leading on the scorecards. The contract Marciano had signed to face Walcott contained a 90 day rematch if he won the title. On 4 March 1953 the two signed to face each other again in Chicago on 15 May, eight months later.

Although Marciano was heavily favored to defeat Walcott (who was now 39 years old), fans were expecting another tough fight. The fight would end up being almost the opposite.

== The fight ==
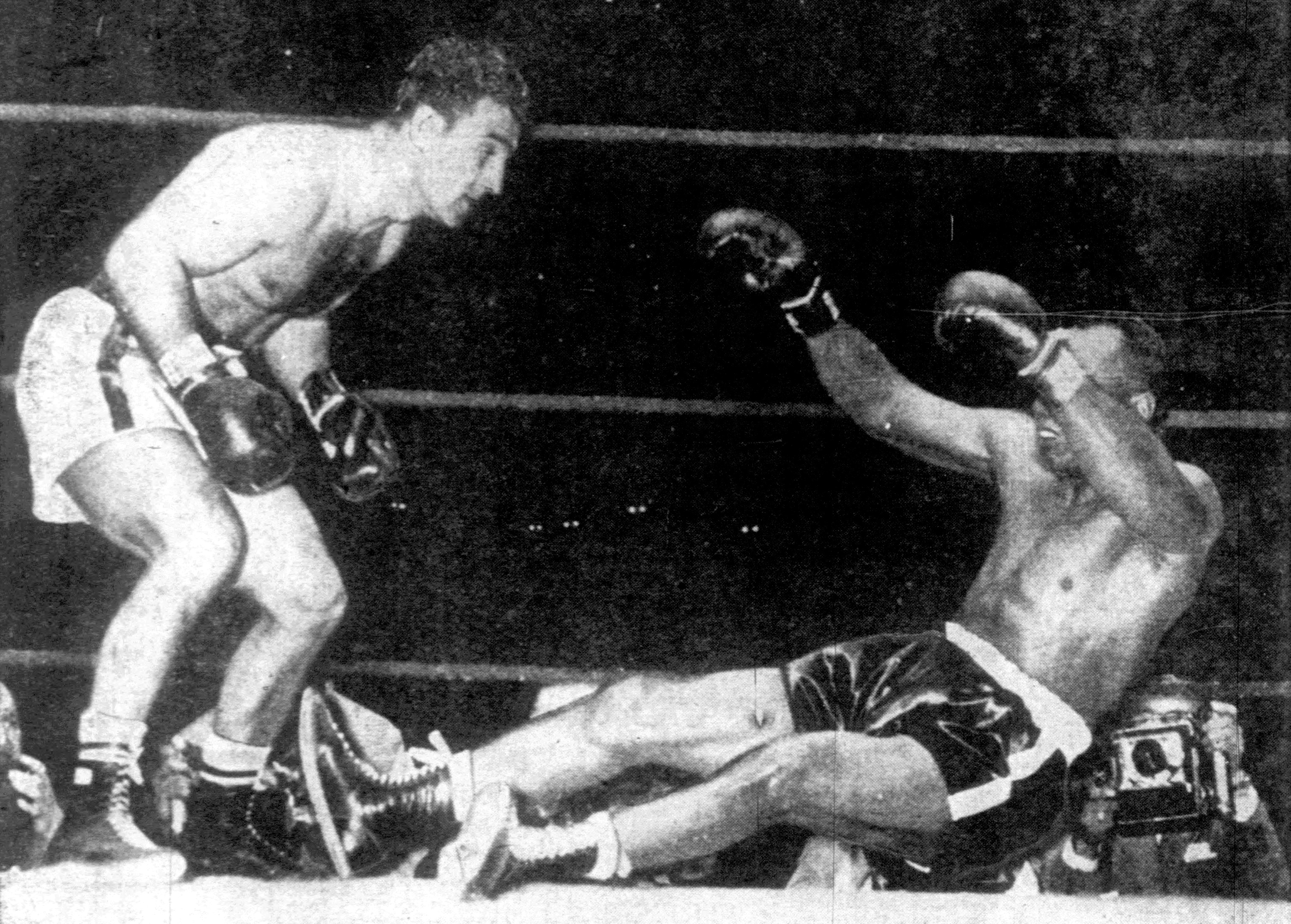
Marciano sends Walcott to the canvas during their 1953 rematch

The fight saw both men attempt to repeat strategies that worked in the previous bout, with Walcott trying to keep the champion at range and Marciano aggressively trying to keep constant pressure on the challenger. Only two minutes into the first round, Marciano countered one of Walcott's jabs with a left hook followed by a right uppercut that sent the former champion to the ground. Although stunned, Walcott did attempt to beat the count, but ultimately rose a split second too late, and was counted out.

The first-round knockout would be Marciano's quickest title defense.

== Aftermath ==
After the fight, Walcott ultimately decided to retire, but stayed active in boxing, going on to become a referee (presiding over several championship bouts including the controversial rematch between Muhammad Ali and Sonny Liston in 1965). In the 1970s and 1980s he also served as the first African American sheriff of Camden County, New Jersey and as chair of the New Jersey State Athletic Commission.

Marciano would go on to hold the heavyweight title until his retirement in 1956, defending his title five more times and going on to retire undefeated and untied. He never attempted a comeback (although he did spar with Muhammad Ali in a famous computer fight), and remained a popular figure in boxing after retirement, particularly on television and radio before his untimely death in a 1969 plane crash.

== Undercard ==
Confirmed bouts:

== Broadcasting ==
Country	Broadcaster
United States	NBC

Preceded by First fight	Rocky Marciano's bouts 15 May 1953	Succeeded by vs. Roland La Starza II
Preceded by First fight	Jersey Joe Walcott's bouts 15 May 1953	Retired
