= Herb Scharfman =

American sports photographer (1912–1998)

- Born: August 24, 1911; Chicago, Illinois, U.S.
- Died: February 21, 1998 (aged 86); Scottsdale, Arizona, U.S.
- Occupation: Sports photographer
- Spouse: Hannah Scharfman
- Children: 2

Herbert "Herb" Scharfman (August 24, 1911 – February 21, 1998) was an American sports photographer notable for several famous photographs of American sports people published by Sports Illustrated and other publications.

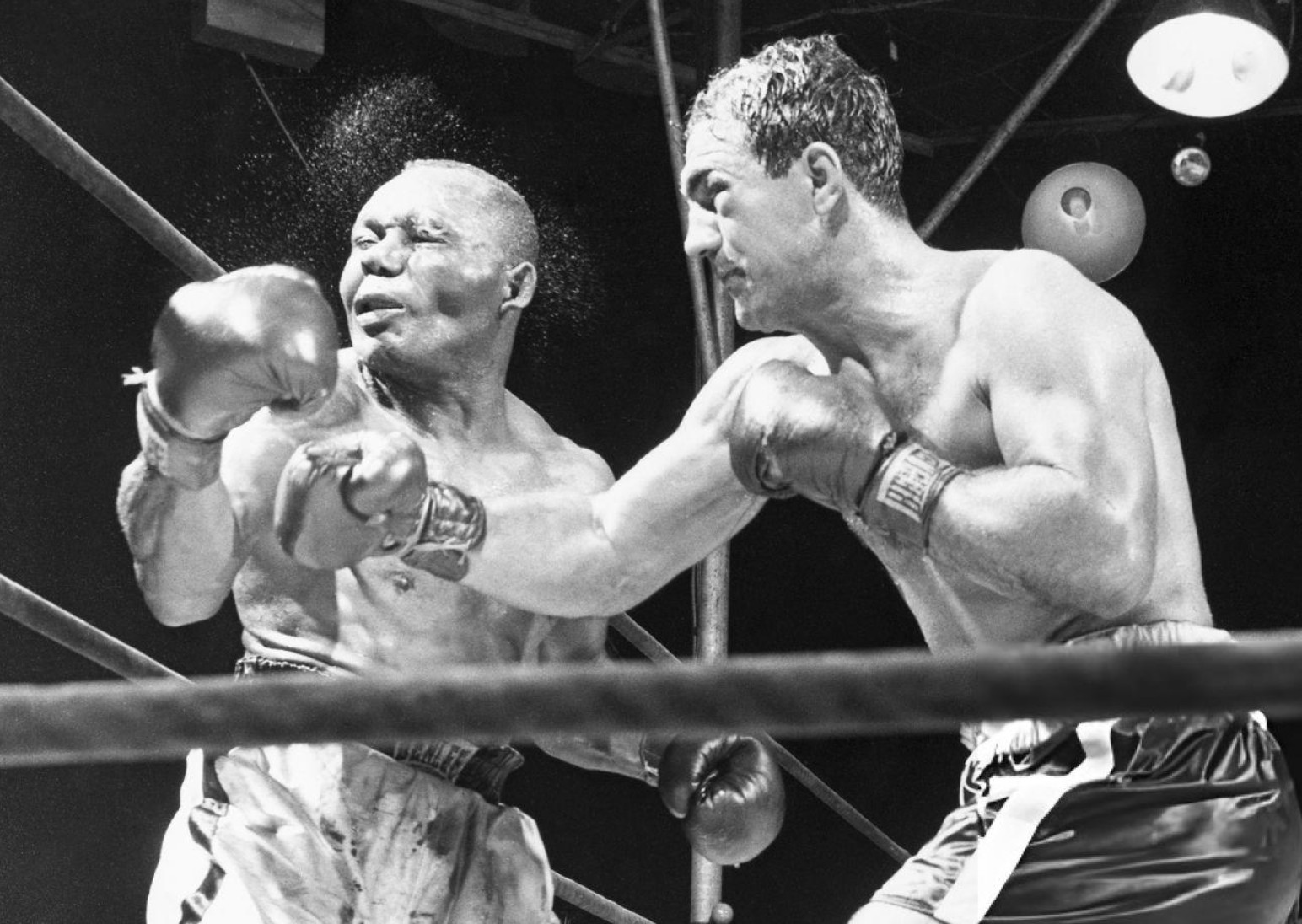
Scharfman's photo of Rocky Marciano knocking out Jersey Joe Walcott

Scharfman, a native of Chicago, began his career in New York as a stringer for International News Photos. His picture of Rocky Marciano's knockout punch in a 1952 bout against Jersey Joe Walcott is widely considered to be one of the most iconic photographs in the history of sports. He later chronicled Roger Maris during his pursuit of Babe Ruth's single-season home run record in 1961. Scharfman's photo of that record breaking moment is one of baseball's most famous photos.

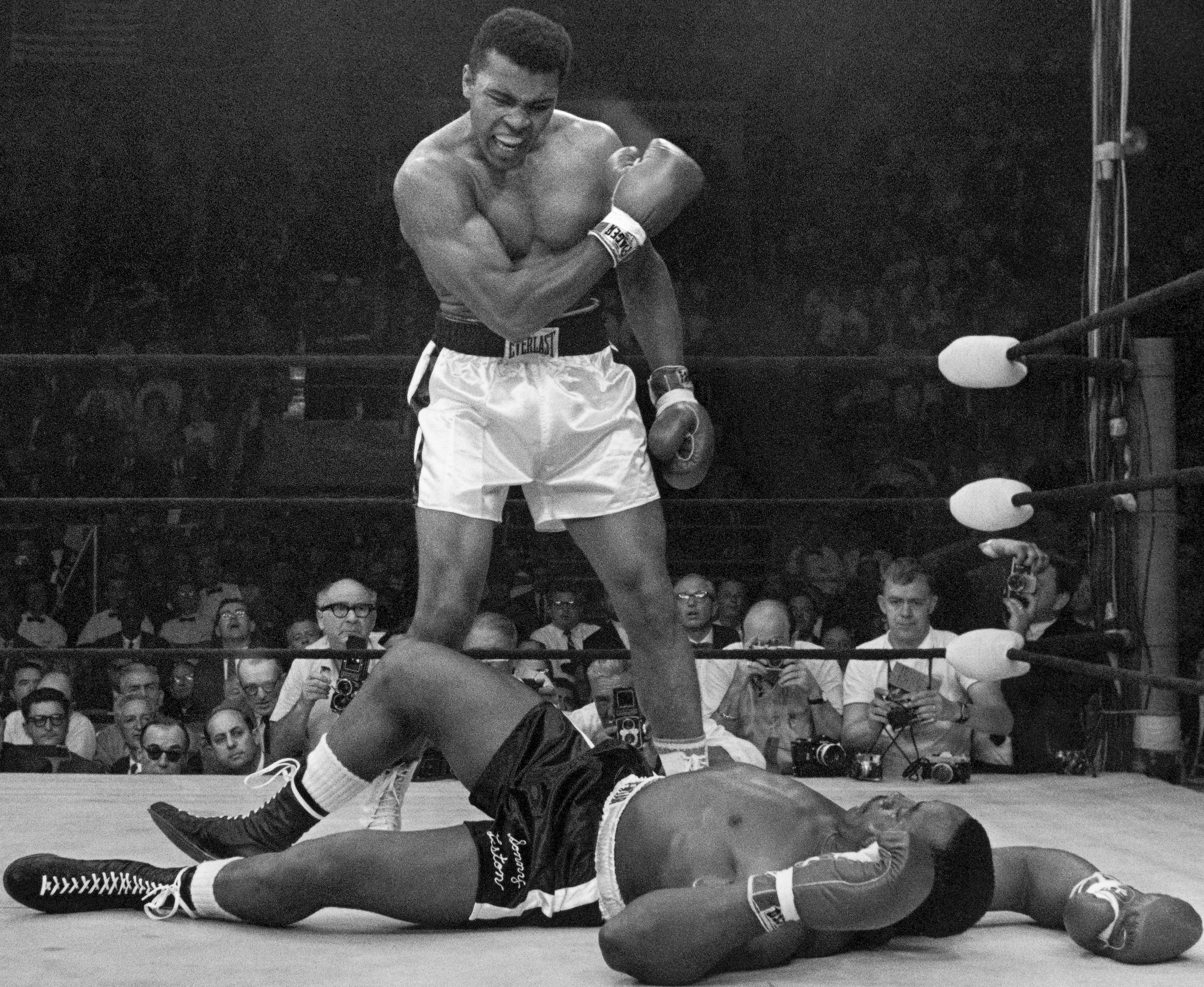
A different shot of Muhammad Ali standing over Sonny Liston, showing Scharfman on the left of Ali's legs.

After International News Photo went out of business, Scharfman joined the staff of Sports Illustrated. Although his photographs graced the magazine's cover fifteen times in a ten-year span, he is best known for a photo in which he appears—Neil Leifer's shot of Muhammad Ali standing over a fallen Sonny Liston in their 1964 rematch. Scharfman was directly across the ring from Leifer, appearing between the legs of Ali in the iconic image. Lefier later said, "Herbie Scharfman was one of the greats, but on that night, he was in the wrong seat."

He died in Scottsdale, Arizona, aged 86, and was survived by his wife Hannah, daughters Loretta and Rebecca, as well as three grandchildren and two great-grandchildren.
