= Dan Florio =

American boxing manager and trainer

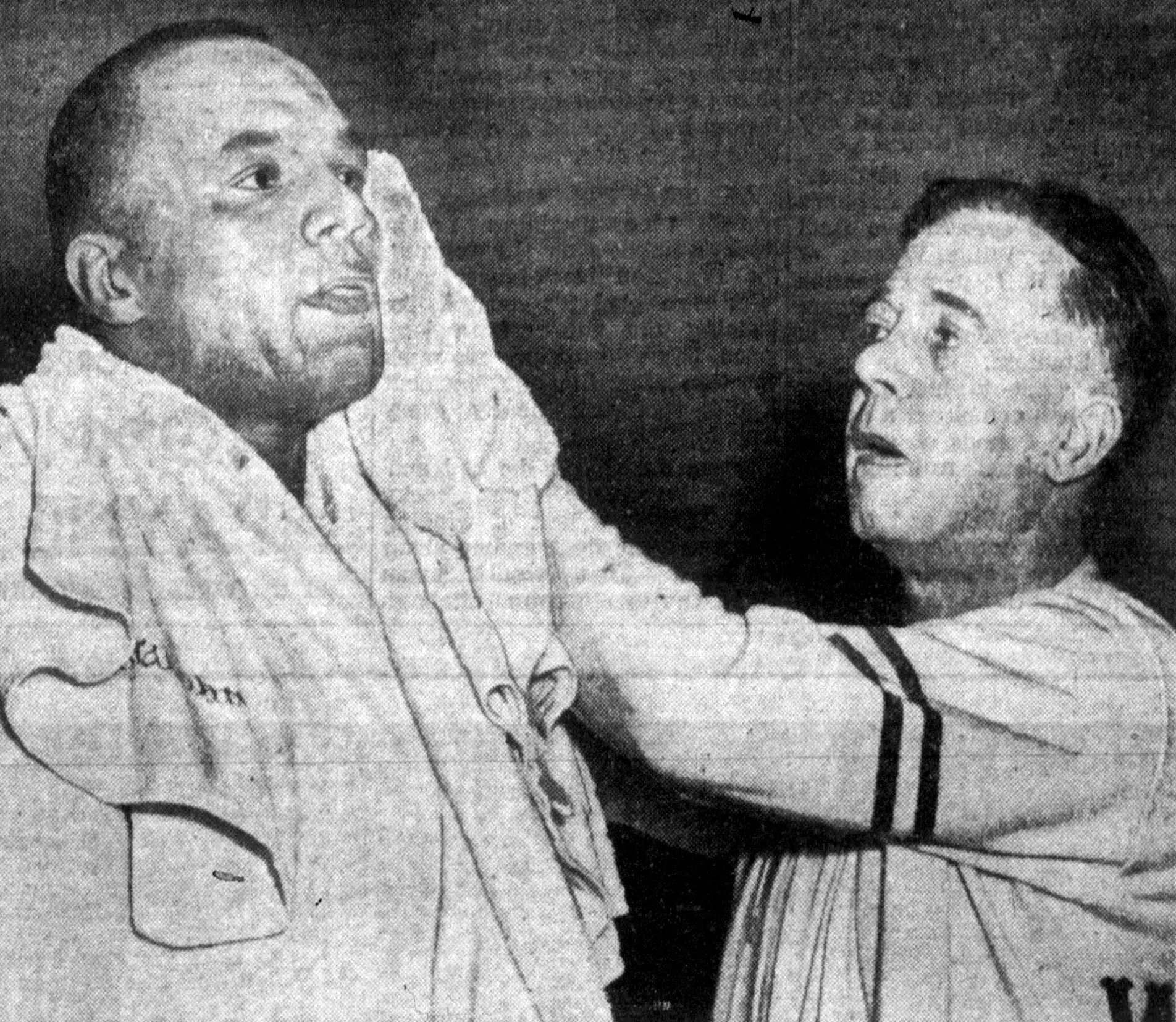
- Boxer Jersey Joe Walcott (left) and trainer Dan Florio (right), 1953
- Born: Dan Florio; United States
- Died: October 7, 1965; Queens, New York, United States
- Occupations: Boxing trainer Cornerman
- Known for: Training Floyd Patterson & Jersey Joe Walcott

Dan Florio was an American boxing manager and trainer active for more than four decades, notably working with Jersey Joe Walcott and Floyd Patterson.

== Career ==
Florio began working with Jersey Joe Walcott in the 1940s and was in his corner for both of Walcott's fights against Joe Louis. Florio prepared Walcott for his 1952 title defense against Rocky Marciano, implementing a game plan focused on lateral footwork, effective counterpunching, and tying up Marciano at close range.

On May 2, 1949, Florio guided Eddie Giosa in his win over the former lightweight champion Lew Jenkins in Philadelphia.

He prepared Roland La Starza for his 1953 rematch against Rocky Marciano. La Starza later claimed Florio "worked him to death" during a long training camp.

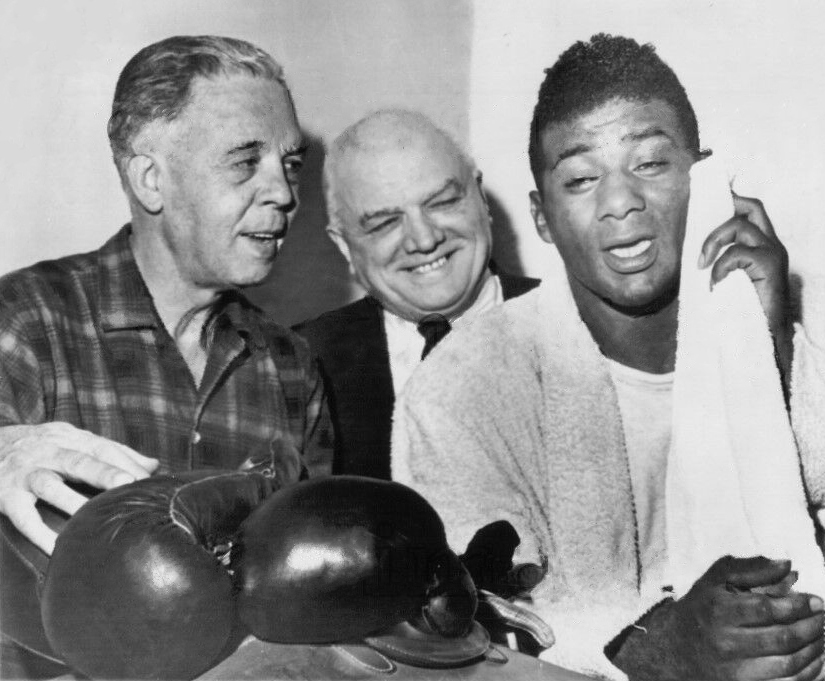
Dan Florio (left), Cus DAmato (middle), and Floyd Patterson (right), 1961

Dan Florio began training Floyd Patterson in 1952, guiding him throughout his professional career. Commenting on Patterson in 1956, he said, "I've trained 500–600 fighters, and I've never seen anything like this boy." Florio guided him to the heavyweight championship. He trained Patterson at Stillman's Gym while Cus D'Amato managed him. Guided by Florio and D'Amato, the boxer recorded 29 wins in his first 30 professional appearances. It was under his watchful eye that Patterson reworked his style following his initial loss to Ingemar Johansson in 1959. Under Florio's guidance, Floyd Patterson abandoned his squared peek-a-boo stance in favor of a traditional boxing stance to improve stability and power. Florio developed a neck-strengthening program and tailored Patterson's diet, resulting in an 8-pound gain and increased resistance to punches. Sparring partners were offered bonuses for knocking Patterson down or staggering him, but none were able to collect.

Florio co-trained Patterson with Buster Watson in 1962. Ahead of Patterson's fight with Sonny Liston, Florio contested the use of Frager gloves, arguing to the Illinois State Athletic Commission that they lacked adequate padding. During the dispute, Florio addressed Jack Nilon, Liston's manager, with the remark: "You keep quiet. I don't know who you are, but I am Dan Florio, trainer of the champion."

When Patterson and D'Amato split after the 1963 Sonny Liston vs. Floyd Patterson II, Florio eventually stepped in as his manager following a seven-year gap.

Among the fighters trained by Dan Florio were Battling Battalino, Tony Canzoneri, Jack Delaney, Elkins Brothers, Freddie Russo, Eddie Giosa, Italo Scortichini, Roland La Starza, Freddie Miller, Paddy DeMarco, Floyd Patterson, Frankie Ryff, Petey Scalzo, Tony DeMarco, and Gene Tunney.

== Death ==
Dan Florio died on October 7, 1965, at Mary Immaculate Hospital in Queens, New York, United States.

Florio's death at age 69 occurred just ahead of the November 1965 Muhammad Ali vs. Floyd Patterson match. Months before the fight, Florio experienced abdominal pain and underwent intestinal surgery in New York, but died shortly after due to complications.
