= Joe Louis vs. Jersey Joe Walcott =

Boxing match

- Date: December 5, 1947
- Venue: Madison Square Garden, New York City, New York, U.S.
- Title(s) on the line: NBA, NYSAC, and The Ring undisputed heavyweight championship

Tale of the tape
Boxer	Joe Louis	Jersey Joe Walcott
Nickname	"The Brown Bomber"	
Hometown	Detroit, Michigan, U.S.	Pennsauken Township, New Jersey, U.S.
Pre-fight record	56–1 (48 KO)	42–13–1 (26 KO)
Age	33 years, 6 months	33 years, 10 months
Height	6 ft 1 1/2 in (187 cm)	6 ft 0 in (183 cm)
Weight	211 1/2 lb (96 kg)	194 1/2 lb (88 kg)
Style	Orthodox	Orthodox
Recognition	NBA, NYSAC and The Ring undisputed Heavyweight Champion	NBA; No. 1 Ranked Heavyweight

Result
- Louis defeats Walcott by split decision

Joe Louis vs. Jersey Joe Walcott was a professional boxing match contested on December 5, 1947, for the undisputed heavyweight championship.

== Background ==
Following his September 1946 1st round stoppage victory over Tami Mauriello, Joe Louis had spent the following months fighting in exhibitions across the Americas, attempting to earn enough money to settle his debts. In August it was announced by promoter Mike Jacobs that Louis would face top ranked contender Jersey Joe Walcott in a 10 round bout at Madison Square Garden on 14 November, with the title only on the line via knockout. Speaking to the press after the bout was signed Walcott's manage Joe Webster told the press "It took'em a long time to come around to us, and we aren't getting the kind of match we wanted but we're happy to have the chance anyway. Walcott deserved a shot at the title long ago, but Louis kept giving him the cold shoulder. Instead, Louis wanted to fight Joe Baksi who was well beaten by Walcott two years ago."

Despite being 4 months older than the champion, Walcott had begun his professional career 4 years before Louis. He had also been a sparring partner for Louis before his first bout with Max Schmeling. After spending much of his early career lacking professional management and a regular training routine, he was noticed by local boxing manager Felix Bocchicchio, during a pair of 1944 bouts in Haddonfield, New Jersey, who saw his potential was able to provide him and his family with the financial stability to enable Walcott focus on boxing full time. With new professional trainers, Nick and Dan Florio, Walcott switched to a professional training routine and diet, while focusing on improving his footwork and counter punching. By the time bout with Louis was made, Walcott had a record of 16–3 since he began working with the Florio brothers, having wins over Joe Baksi, Jimmy Bivins, Joey Maxim & Elmer Ray and having avenged all three of his defeats.

On September 16, Louis agreed to the request of the NYSAC chair Eddie Eagan to change to the bout to a full 15 round championship bout in exchange for pushing the date back three weeks to 5 December in order to allow him more time to train.

Louis was a 1 to 10 favourite to win.

== The fight ==
In front of a sold-out crowd of 18,194, Walcott stunned the champion by dropping him with a quick right to the head in the first round. The champion was up at the count of two and continued jabbing while looking for openings against the dancing Walcott. Louis was dropped again in the fourth by a hard right to jaw, this time rising at the count of seven. The champion appeared confused by the unorthodox style of the challenger, who was fighting cautiously, bobbing and weaving and looking to land counter punchers. Louis was able to control the middle rounds as Walcott wasn't throwing many punches; however, he failed to hurt the challenger until the ninth round when a right cross to the head shook him and forced him to cover up. The champion was unable to follow-up, and Walcott was able to recover. The final few rounds were characterised by Louis ineffectively stalking the challenger, who was keeping him at bay with movement and flicking punches.

After the full 15 rounds Louis, his left eye nearly closed, attempted to immediately leave the ring without hearing the decision and had to be forcibly restrained by his handlers. However when the scorecards were read, one judge, Ruby Goldstein, scored it for Walcott 7–6–2, while the other two had it for Louis 8–6–1 and 9–6 giving him a split decision victory. With the two knockdowns, under the 10-point must system that became the standard for boxing in the 1970s, Walcott would have most likely won a Unanimous decision with scores of 144–141, 143–141 & 142–141. A ringside poll of 32 boxing writers had 21 scoring the bout for Walcott, 10 for Louis and 1 calling it a draw.

== Aftermath ==
The crowd booed the decision when it was announced, with Walcott appearing stunned that he had lost. When asked in his dressing room after the bout if he thought that Walcott was a second-rate fighter Louis replied, "No. I am". His trainer Mannie Seamon stated that Louis had most likely fractured his right hand in the 5th round. A largely unmarked Walcott meanwhile told the press "I thought I won. Louis told me he was sorry. After the decision he said to me, "I'm sorry, Joe.""

Walcott and his manager Joe Webster, appealed to the NYSAC on the grounds that judge Frank Forbes had given Walcott more points than Louis despite having Louis the winner by number of rounds won. The commission however declined to overturn the decision.

== Undercard ==
Confirmed bouts:

== Broadcasting ==
Country	Broadcaster
United States	NBC

Preceded by vs. Tami Mauriello	Joe Louis's bouts 5 December 1947	Succeeded by Rematch
Preceded by vs. Joey Maxim	Jersey Joe Walcott's bouts 5 December 1947	Succeeded by Rematch
Awards
Preceded by Tony Zale vs. Rocky Graziano; Round 6	The Ring Round of the Year; Round 4; 1947	Succeeded by Joe Louis vs. Jersey Joe Walcott II; Round 11
