= Davy Miller =

Davy Miller was a Jewish-American gangster who ran the Miller gang in 1920s Chicago.

== Biography ==
One of nine children Miller was born in Cincinnati, Ohio, most likely in 1880, later moving to Maxwell Street in Chicago, Illinois as a child.

Jewish Chicagoans formed ethnic gangs to rival the ethnic gangs of other ethnicities in the city such as the Italians, Irish and Poles. Gangs like Millers defended the local Jews from harassment. Miller recalls "What I have done from the time I was a boy was to fight for my people here in the ghetto against Irish, Poles, or any other nationality". Jewish gangsters like Miller became heroes to young Jewish kids growing up in the ghetto. Miller remarked "Maybe I am a hero to the young folks among my people, but its not because I'm a gangster. It's because I've always been ready to help all or any of them in a pinch".

Miller's gang operated out of his restaurant and boxing gymnasium. He and his brothers were involved in gambling, extortion and bootlegging. He also worked as a boxing referee.

In January 1924 Miller and his brother Max were shot by Dean O'Banion of the North Side Gang as they walked out of the play Give and Take at the La Salle Theatre. On their way in they had insulted an acquaintance of O'Banion who shot them in retaliation. Max was shielded by his belt buckle but Davy was seriously injured. He was rushed to hospital where he remained in a critical condition for days before making an eventual recovery. He never told the police who had shot him. When O'Banion was killed in November 1924 Miller was brought in as a suspect but was released after providing an alibi. Miller stated "I might as well admit that I'm glad he's dead. But I'm also glad that my family had nothing to do with it."

In 1925 Miller and his brother Harry were arrested and charged with conspiracy for involvement in a "plot to extort bribe money from a peddler of dope".

As a boxing referee he had a long and distinguished career, adjudicating around 5000 fights. He was set to be the referee for the famous The Long Count Fight between Jack Dempsey and Gene Tunney in 1927 but was replaced at the last minute by Dave Barry when it was rumored that Al Capone had bet on Dempsey and had taken Miller for a car ride. In 1928 he attended the first ever Golden Gloves meet and in 1949 he refereed the Jersey Joe Walcott vs. Ezzard Charles fight. In 1950 he retired as a boxing referee and was honoured with a testimonial dinner by the Illinois Boxing Commission. Miller knew the boxer Barney Ross who fought in his gym. He introduced Ross to his manager Sam Sian and he fought at the first Golden Gloves event in 1928 under Miller's sponsorship.
