= Joe Louis vs. Jersey Joe Walcott II =

Boxing match

- Date: June 25, 1948
- Venue: Yankee Stadium, New York City, New York, U.S.
- Title(s) on the line: NBA, NYSAC, and The Ring undisputed heavyweight championship

Tale of the tape
Boxer	Joe Louis	Jersey Joe Walcott
Nickname	"The Brown Bomber"	
Hometown	Detroit, Michigan, U.S.	Pennsauken Township, New Jersey, U.S.
Purse	$250,000	$125,000
Pre-fight record	57–1 (48 KO)	42–14–1 (26 KO)
Age	34 years, 1 month	34 years, 4 months
Height	6 ft 1 1/2 in (187 cm)	6 ft 0 in (183 cm)
Weight	213 1/2 lb (97 kg)	194 3/4 lb (88 kg)
Style	Orthodox	Orthodox
Recognition	NBA, NYSAC and The Ring undisputed Heavyweight Champion	NBA/The Ring; No. 1 Ranked Heavyweight

Result
- Louis defeats Walcott by 11th round KO

Joe Louis vs. Jersey Joe Walcott II was a professional boxing match contested on June 25, 1948, for the undisputed heavyweight championship.

== Background ==
After the controversial split decision in their first bout, Jersey Joe Walcott and his manager Joe Webster had appealed to the NYSAC on the grounds that judge Frank Forbes had given Walcott more points than Joe Louis despite having Louis the winner by number of rounds won. The commission however declined to overturn the decision. As a result talk of a rematch began immediately.

After a prolonged series of negotiations, with Gus Lesnevich mentioned as an alternative challenger, should the two camps fail to agree terms, on 27 February 1948 the bout was agreed for 25 June at Yankee Stadium.

Though Louis was favourite to win, the 5 to 13 fractional odds were his longest since the 1938 rematch with Max Schmeling.

== The fight ==
The bout began slow and cautiously, with Walcott flicking out his left and moving to the side the same way he had in their first bout. Walcott would drop Louis in the third round with a left to the head followed by a right cross to the chin. The champion rose at the count of 1 and didn't appear hurt, however by the end of the following round his left eye was beginning to swell. Much like the previous bout between them, Walcott's speed and effective counter punching left Louis appearing slow and ponderous, unable to corner the older man.

After boos from the crowd at the lack of action at the end of the 10th, Louis landed a right cross that hurt Walcott in the 11th round and had the challenger pinned on the ropes. Louis followed up with a smashing right and a volley of blows that sent the challenger down to the canvas and on to his back. Walcott failed to beat the count and Louis was awarded a knockout victory. It was his 25th title defence and his 22nd by stoppage. At the time of the stoppage one judge had it 6–3–1 for Walcott, another had it for him 5–4–1 while the third had it for Louis 5–2–3. The Associated Press had it 5–5.

== Aftermath ==
Immediately after the bout Louis announced his retirement saying "For my mother, tonight was my last fight", telling reporters in his dressing room "I wanted to go out the champ. He gave me a hard time and I'm happy to have won". Potential successors included Walcott, Lesnevich and Ezzard Charles. Louis continued appearing in exhibition bouts until his formal retirement on 1 March 1949.

== Undercard ==
Confirmed bouts:

Preceded by First bout	Joe Louis's bouts 25 June 1948	Succeeded by vs. Ezzard Charles
Preceded by First bout	Jersey Joe Walcott's bouts 25 June 1948	Succeeded by vs. Ezzard Charles
Awards
Preceded by Joe Louis vs. Jersey Joe Walcott; Round 4	The Ring Round of the Year; Round 11; 1948	Succeeded by Rocky Graziano vs. Charley Fusari; Round 10
