= The Super Fight =

- DVD cover
- Directed by: Murray Woroner
- Produced by: Murray Woroner
- Starring: Rocky Marciano; Muhammad Ali; Angelo Dundee; Ferdie Pacheco; Jim Braddock; Joe Louis; Max Schmeling; Jack Sharkey; Jersey Joe Walcott; Murray Woroner; Guy Le Bow
- Distributed by: Woroner Productions
- Release date: January 20, 1970 (U.S.)
- Language: English
- Box office: $5 million

The Super Fight was a fictional, computerized boxing match between Rocky Marciano and Muhammad Ali shot in 1969 and released in 1970. At the time, Ali and Marciano were the only undefeated heavyweight champions in history and fans often debated who would win had they met in their primes. Ali and Marciano were filmed sparring for 75 one-minute rounds producing several possible scenarios for a genuine fight, with the result claimed to have been determined using probability formulas entered into a computer.

The final film was only shown once in select cinemas around the world, grossing $5 million ($41 million adjusted for inflation) from 1,500 theaters across North America and Europe. After its run in theaters, the film was broadcast on television before eventually being released as a DVD over three decades later.

== Background ==
In 1967, radio producer Murray Woroner had the idea of determining the all-time great heavyweight champion of the world by placing boxing champions of different eras in a series of fantasy fights. Woroner sent out a survey to 250 boxing experts and writers to help determine which boxers would be used in what would become a fantasy tournament. Hank Meyer, president and salesman with one other partner in SPS, was instrumental in setting this competition up and contended at the time that it was his idea. Woroner picked the first round of fantasy matches to be:

- Jack Dempsey vs. Gentleman Jim Corbett
- John L. Sullivan vs. Jim Braddock
- Bob Fitzsimmons vs. Jack Sharkey
- Jim Jeffries vs. Jersey Joe Walcott
- Joe Louis vs. Jess Willard
- Max Baer vs. Jack Johnson
- Rocky Marciano vs. Gene Tunney
- Muhammad Ali vs. Max Schmeling

Punch-by-punch details of the boxer's records during their prime were entered into an NCR 315 computer. Their strengths, weaknesses, fighting styles and patterns and other factors and scenarios that the boxers could go through were converted into formulas. The NCR-315 with 20K of memory was supplied by SPS (Systems Programming Services), an independent service bureau in Miami, Florida. The algorithms were supplied by an NCR mathematician, and programming was done in Fortran by an employee of SPS. Hank Meyer, President and salesman with one other partner in SPS, was instrumental in setting this competition up and contended at the time that it was his idea. The actual running of the software was done the night before each broadcast round of the 'computer championship' and took approximately 45 minutes to run, the output was a formatted report containing a series of codes describing each punch. This was then written to magnetic tape, the tape was then manually transferred to a Univac 1005 and printed. This took place in early 1968.

The outcomes were then staged as radio plays with Woroner and radio announcer Guy LeBow as the commentators. The fantasy fights were broadcast worldwide. Even the boxers who were still alive at the time listened to the programs and some of them participated as commentators. After the series of elimination rounds, the final fight was between Dempsey and Marciano. Marciano defeated Dempsey and was considered to be the all-time greatest heavyweight champion by the computer. Woroner awarded the real Marciano a gold and diamond championship belt worth $10,000.

== The film ==
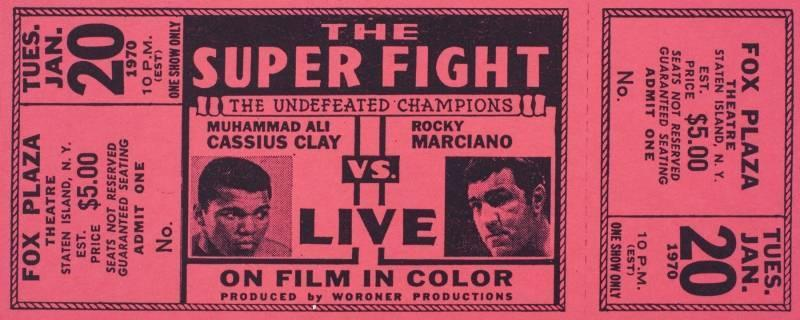
A theater ticket for the filmed staged match between Ali and Marciano

After Ali lost a fantasy fight in one of the radio broadcasts, he filed a $1 million lawsuit against Woroner for defamation of character, stating his anger at his elimination at the second round to Jim Jeffries, a boxer Ali had previously called "history's clumsiest, most slow-footed heavyweight." The lawsuit was settled when Woroner offered to pay Ali $10,000 while also getting his agreement to participate in a filmed version of a fantasy fight in which he would fight Marciano. Ali and Marciano agreed on the condition that they would also receive a cut of the film's profits.

Marciano, whose last fight before retiring undefeated at 49–0 was 14 years prior, also agreed to participate with a similar deal. In preparation for the film, Rocky lost over 50 pounds (23 kg) and wore a toupee in order to look as he did in his prime. Both he and Ali were reported to be enthusiastic about meeting each other and getting back in the ring.

The same formulas as the radio fantasy fights were used and entered into the NCR 315, with filming commencing February 1969 in a Miami studio. The two fighters sparred for between 70 and 75 rounds, exchanging mainly body blows with some head shots in-between, which were later edited together according to the findings of the computer. Braddock, Louis, Schmeling, Sharkey and Walcott also recorded commentary to be used in the film.

The outcome would not be revealed until the release of the film on January 20, 1970, shown in 1,500 theaters by video link in the United States, Canada, and throughout Europe. American and Canadian audiences were shown a version of Marciano knocking out Ali in the 13th round, as staged by the boxers, while European audiences were shown another ending in which Ali was depicted as the winner after opening cuts on Marciano, also simulated.

== Box office and reaction ==
In the United States, the film grossed more than $2.5 million from more than a thousand theaters. Across North America and Europe, the film grossed $5 million ($41 million adjusted for inflation) from 1,500 theaters.

Three weeks after filming was completed, Rocky Marciano died in a plane crash on the eve of what would have been his 46th birthday. No feedback was recorded from him personally regarding the film, with the exception of Marciano's brother Peter who claimed that upon Rocky being asked whether he would win the fantasy fight, he was confident that he would win.

Ali attended a screening of the film on the night of its release. He immediately relaunched legal proceedings against Woroner, again stating defamation of character, alleging the film's marketing had misled audiences worldwide to believe the fight was actual, while also stating any version of the film which depicted him losing was a result of him not taking the simulation seriously. He also claimed American audiences were left angered by Marciano being depicted as the winner and disputed whether the NCR 315 computer was used at all during or after filming. Ali later dropped the lawsuit upon discovering his depicted win in European theatres, while also having been made aware of the filmmaker's plans to destroy remaining prints of the film to prevent potential legal action.

In a 1976 interview, Ali briefly recapped the film maintaining his ridicule of the style of filming and depicted outcomes. He however praised Marciano as a boxer stating they left filming on good terms.

== Destruction of film prints and recovery ==
During the buildup to the film's release, concerns were held regarding Ali's ban from boxing being active at the time of the film's conceptualization, recording and release, and were later fueled by allegations that marketing and promotional work for the film did not clearly detail that the fight was fictional and the outcome was decided by the NCR 315 computer as well as opinions of boxing experts. Upon the film's release, believing audiences were misled to believe the fight was actual and Ali threatening a second lawsuit upon Woroner, the producers announced all film prints had been destroyed.

Debates subsequently took place over the next three decades as to whether at least one print of the film had survived. It was cited that many theaters had continued to play the film long after January 20, 1970, and was also noted that the film had one airing on ABC's Wide World of Sports in 1970, and another on CBS late night in 1977, with many more broadcasts alleged throughout.

Following an official discovery of a surviving print in 2005, the film was authorized for release and distribution. On December 27, 2005, The Superfight: Marciano vs. Ali was released on DVD and has been televised several times since. The DVD includes a documentary about the film, audio of the original radio fantasy fights, archival interviews with the fighters that were chosen, and other features.

== Legacy ==
The Super Fight was featured in and inspired the plot of the 2006 film Rocky Balboa.
