= Tommy Gómez =

American boxer

Personal information
- Nickname: Tampa Tommy
- Nationality: American
- Born: December 25, 1919 Tampa, Florida
- Died: April 27, 2006 (aged 82)
- Height: 5 ft 10 1/2 in (179 cm)
- Weight: Heavyweight

Boxing career
- Stance: Orthodox

Boxing record
- Total fights: 89
- Wins: 78
- Win by KO: 67
- Losses: 9
- Draws: 2

Thomas Eugene Gómez Jr. (December 25, 1919 – April 27, 2006) was an American heavyweight professional boxer. Known for his punching power, 86% of his 78 victories ended in knockout.

== Professional career ==
Gómez was born December 25, 1919, in Tampa, Florida.

Gómez, known as "Tampa Tommy" also "Terrible Tom the Tampa Thumper", turned pro in 1939. Although Gómez never fought for a major title, he fought several notable fighters of his era, including Jersey Joe Walcott. He was often ducked by many of the heavyweight contenders of his time due to his fierce power. Gómez was a feared knockout artist, and was named to the Ring Magazine list of the 100 greatest punchers of all time. After 89 professional fights, Gómez retired in 1950 with a career boxing record of 78-9-2 (67 KOs). He was inducted into the Florida Boxing Hall of Fame June 27, 2010.

== Personal ==
Gómez was Spanish-American, his parents having immigrated from Spain. Mother Josefa immigrated from Lugo, Sarria, Spain, and father, Thomas Gomez Sr, from Valladolid, Spain.

Gómez was a World War II Purple Heart veteran who was wounded 16 times in Germany. He returned and resumed his boxing career with shrapnel still lodged in his arms and back. He was a mentor to the Police Athletic League program in Tampa and maintained an active interest in boxing throughout his life. For many years he had his own line of cigars, "Tommy Gomez Champs", manufactured in Ybor City. He was also an artist and music lover. He died April 27, 2006, in a hospital in Austell, Georgia after a brief illness. His survivors include four daughters by his wife of 58 years, Opal May Gómez. Daughters: Lynda G. Wheelock; Daphne G. McElwreath; Toni Gomez Gwaltney; and Melanie Gomez Rocca. He was buried in Tampa, Florida, on Tuesday, May 2.
