= Jersey Joe Walcott vs. Ezzard Charles =

Boxing match

- Date: June 22, 1949
- Venue: Comiskey Park, Chicago, Illinois, U.S.
- Title on the line: vacant NBA heavyweight championship

Tale of the tape
Boxer	Jersey Joe Walcott	Ezzard Charles
Nickname		"The Cincinnati Cobra"
Hometown	Pennsauken Township, New Jersey, U.S.	Cincinnati, Ohio, U.S.
Pre-fight record	42–15–1 (26 KO)	62–5–1 (36 KO)
Age	35 years, 4 months	27 years, 11 months
Height	6 ft 0 in (183 cm)	6 ft 0 in (183 cm)
Weight	195 3/4 lb (89 kg)	181 3/4 lb (82 kg)
Style	Orthodox	Orthodox
Recognition	NBA/The Ring; No. 1 Ranked Heavyweight	NBA/The Ring; No. 2 Ranked Heavyweight

Result
- Charles defeats Walcott by unanimous decision

Jersey Joe Walcott vs. Ezzard Charles was a professional boxing match contested on June 22, 1949, for the NBA heavyweight championship.

== Background ==
Immediately after his 11th round knockout of Jersey Joe Walcott in their June 1948 rematch, his 25th title defence, undisputed heavyweight champion Joe Louis announced his retirement saying "For my mother, tonight was my last fight", telling reporters in his dressing room "I wanted to go out the champ. He gave me a hard time and I'm happy to have won". However Louis continued appearing in exhibition bouts until his formal retirement on 1 March 1949. On the same day, the newly formed International Boxing Club (of which Louis was a part owner) was granted the right by the NBA to promote a June bout between their top two contenders, Walcott and Ezzard Charles for their now vacant heavyweight title. The winner would then defend against either Gus Lesnevich or Lee Savold. NYSAC chair Eddie Eagan declined to sanction the bout saying that instead of having one bout for the title, a tournament should be held. As a result the bout would be held in Chicago, Illinois with only the NBA title on the line.

Walcott would be making his third attempt to win the title, the first time in history that a fighter had that opportunity.

Charles entered the bout as a slight favourite. Davy Miller served as referee for the fight.

== The fight ==
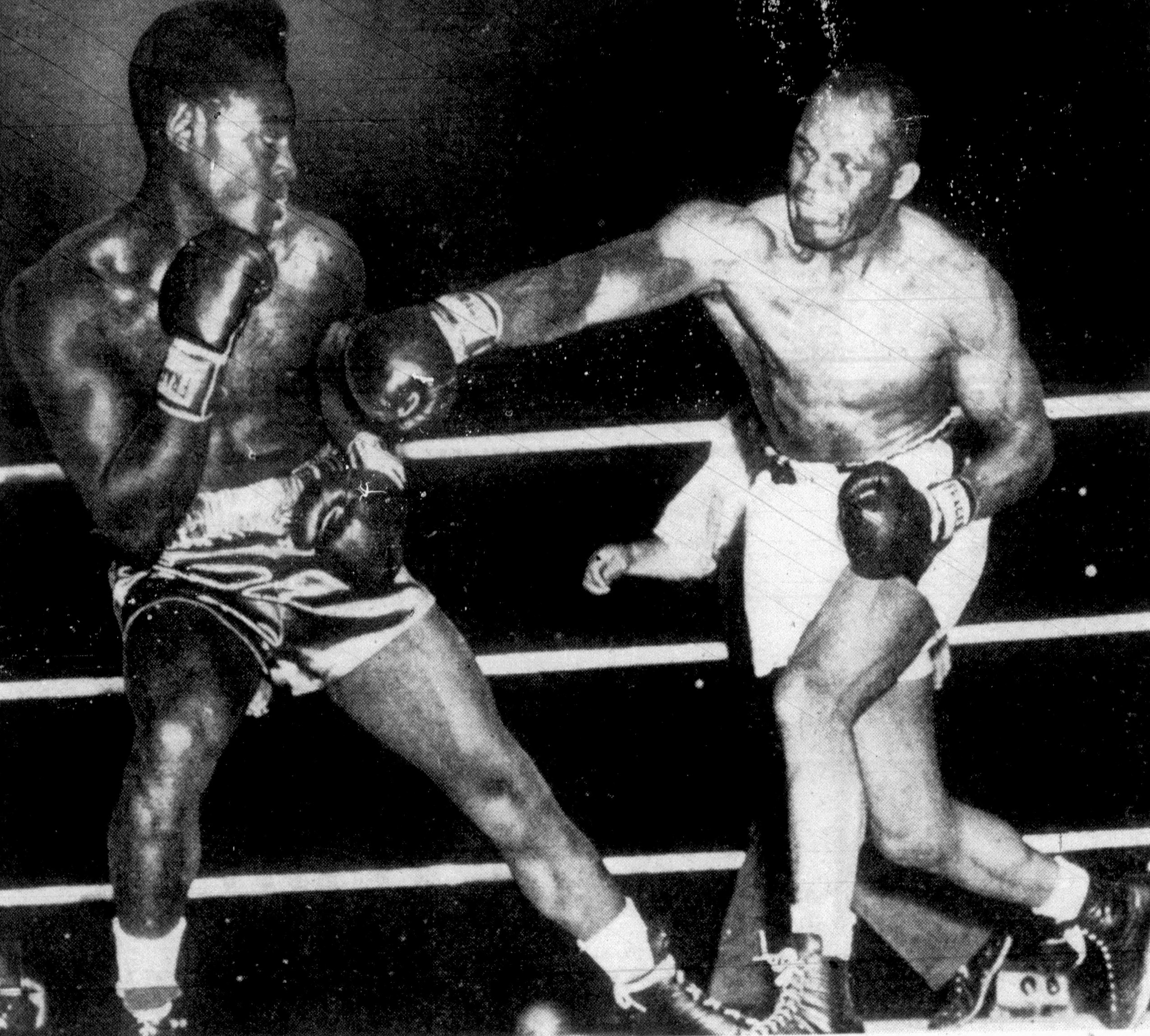
Charles (left) dodges a right hand from Walcott (right)

Walcott begin the fight strongly, looking for an early knockout and generally forcing the fight for most of the eight rounds, however as the rounds progressed he reverted back to his usual counter punching style. Charles, generally a counter puncher too, remained patient and waited for openings. This resulted in a lack of action, especially in the later rounds as Walcott tired and Charles failed to take advantage, prompting boos from the crowd of 25,932.

The fight went the full 15 round distance with Charles being awarded a unanimous decision victory, with scores of 77–73, 78–72 and 78–72. Charles' manager Jake Mintz collapsed in the ring after the result was announced, however he quickly recovered and was able to leave the ring under his own steam.

== Aftermath ==
Speaking after the bout the new champion told the press of his future plans "I'm going to Cincinnati and play a lot of golf until another fight is lined up for me. I want to be a great champion like Louis and do a lot of fighting. But I also want to be a good golfer like him."

Walcott meanwhile when interviewed in his dressing room said "I thought I won at least nine rounds, Charles is not a great fighter. He's a sneaky puncher. He hit me coming out of the clinches all of the time. When the referee broke us, I stopped punching, but that dirty fighter kept banging away." He would also claim that he had hurt his right hand in the 4th round.

Mintz would tell reporters that he was travelling to the UK for the planned 6 September bout between Savold and British, Commonwealth and European champion Bruce Woodcock, hoping to arrange a bout between the winner and Charles in late September or early October.

== Undercard ==
Confirmed bouts:

== Broadcasting ==
Country	Broadcaster
United States	NBC

Preceded by vs. Joe Louis II	Jersey Joe Walcott's bouts 22 June 1949	Succeeded by vs. Olle Tandberg
Preceded by vs. Joey Maxim	Ezzard Charles's bouts 22 June 1949	Succeeded by vs. Gus Lesnevich
