= Freddie Russo =

American featherweight boxer (1924-1987)

Freddie Russo (October 3, 1924 – 1987) was an American featherweight boxer who won the New Jersey Golden Gloves title on four occasions and defeated four world champions during his career, though he never won a title himself in a career in which he had an overall record of 102-14-4..

Born in Brooklyn, Russo was raised in Rahway, New Jersey. He received his first set of gloves as a four-year-old, a gift from an older brother, and the two started boxing each other. After winning a series of fights at school with classmates, he started fighting—and beating—fellow students in higher grades. His parents entered him into an instructional boxing program run by the local Police Athletic League, which became his gateway to amateur boxing. As an amateur, he was a four-time winner of the state Golden Gloves title.

He turned professional in April 1943, at the age of 18. With Irving Cohen as his manager and Whitey Bimstein as his trainer, he proceeded to go undefeated in his first 51 fights, which included wins against former world featherweight champions Mike Belloise, Harry Jeffra, and Jackie Wilson. A knockout of George Knox gave Russo the state's featherweight title, but he rejected the belt that came with the victory, saying that "it's the World Championship that I'm after". In July 1945, he fought Sal Bartolo in front of more than 10,000 fans at Madison Square Garden for the National Boxing Association featherweight title in the night's featured bout, losing his first professional fight by decision in ten rounds.

He was inducted into the New Jersey Boxing Hall of Fame in 1985.
