= Jersey Joe Walcott =

American boxer (1914–1994)

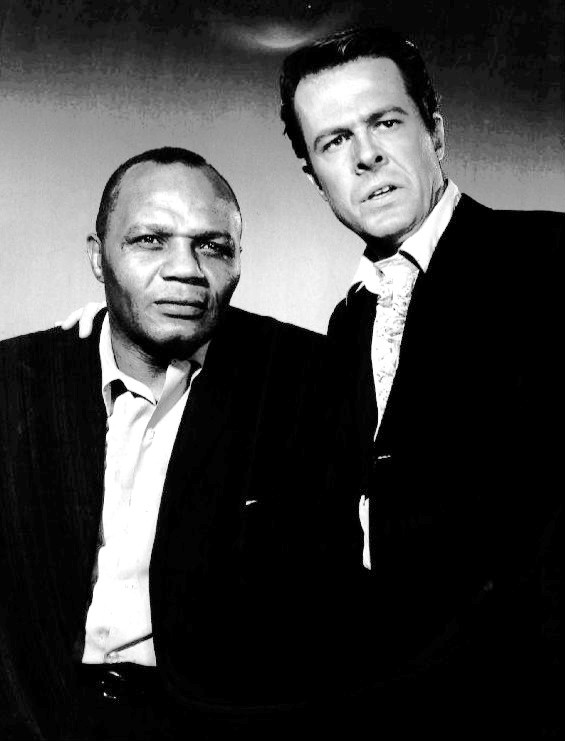
- Walcott (left) with Robert Culp in the television series Cain's Hundred in 1962

Personal information
- Nickname: Jersey Joe
- Nationality: American
- Born: Arnold Raymond Cream; January 31, 1914 Pennsauken Township, New Jersey, U.S.
- Died: February 25, 1994 (aged 80) Camden, New Jersey, U.S.
- Height: 6 ft 0 in (183 cm)
- Weight: Heavyweight

Boxing career
- Reach: 74 in (188 cm)
- Stance: Orthodox

Boxing record
- Total fights: 70
- Wins: 49
- Win by KO: 31
- Losses: 20
- Draws: 1

Sheriff of Camden County, New Jersey
- In office 1971–1974
- Preceded by: Martin Segal
- Succeeded by: Joseph W. Coyle

Personal details
- Resting place: Sunset Memorial Park Cemetery; Pennsauken Township, New Jersey
- Party: Democratic
- Occupation: Boxer

Arnold Raymond Cream (January 31, 1914 – February 25, 1994), best known as Jersey Joe Walcott, was an American professional boxer who competed from 1930 to 1953. He held the New York State Athletic Commission (NYSAC), National Boxing Association (NBA), and The Ring heavyweight titles from 1951 to 1952, and broke the record for the oldest man to win the title, at the age of 37. That record would hold for over four decades until it was eventually broken in 1994 by 45-year-old George Foreman. Despite holding the world heavyweight title for a relatively short period of time, Walcott was regarded among the best heavyweights in the world during the 1940s and 1950s.

After retiring from boxing, Walcott did some acting, playing small parts in a few movies and television shows. He also refereed several boxing matches, but after the controversial ending to the second fight between Muhammad Ali and Sonny Liston, Walcott was not asked to referee again. From 1971 to 1974, Walcott held the elected position of Sheriff of Camden County, New Jersey, the first African-American to do so. From 1975 to 1984, he was the chairman of the New Jersey State Athletic Commission.

== Early life ==
Walcott was born in Pennsauken Township, New Jersey on January 31, 1914. His father was an immigrant from St. Thomas, Danish West Indies. His mother was from Jordantown (Pennsauken Township), New Jersey. Walcott dropped out of school at age 15 after his father's death, and began working at the Campbell Soup factory in Camden, New Jersey to support his mother and 11 siblings. Later he married Lydia Cream, and the two had six children together.

From a relatively young age Walcott began training as a boxer. He took the name of his boxing idol, Joe Walcott, a welterweight champion from Barbados. He added "Jersey" to distinguish himself and show where he was from.

== Boxing career ==
Walcott debuted as a professional boxer at the young age of 16 on September 9, 1930, fighting Eddie "Cowboy" Wallace and winning by a knockout in the first round.

After this victory, Walcott fought on and off throughout the rest of the decade (Walcott lacked professional management and a regular training routine, causing him to struggle during his early career). Although he defeated a young Elmer Ray, he lost two bouts to Tiger Jack Fox and was knocked out by heavyweight contender Abe Simon in 1940. After losing to Simon, Walcott was inactive for over four years. During World War II, Walcott secured a wartime job, and did not fight again until 1944, winning two matches against local fighters Felix Del Paoli and Ellis Singleton.

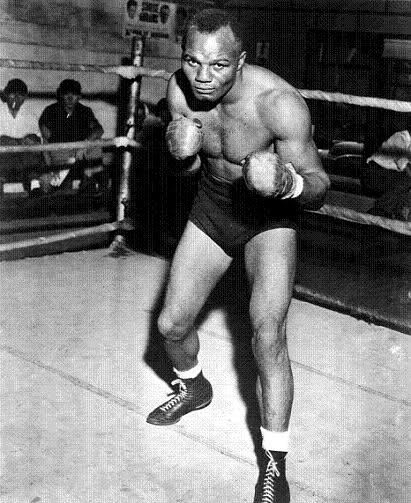
Jersey Joe Walcott in 1937

It was during these fights that Walcott was noticed by local boxing manager Felix Bocchicchio, who saw great potential in the fighter. Although Bocchicchio had a criminal history, he was well connected in the boxing scene and was able to provide Walcott and his family with financial stability, so that Walcott could now focus on fighting full time. He also got Walcott professional trainers, Nick and Dan Florio (two brothers who worked with several world champions). Together they got Walcott on a professional routine and diet, while improving his footwork and counter punching to turn him into a very crafty fighter.

Now under professional management, Walcott resumed his boxing career in 1945. He quickly rose through the heavyweight ranks, defeating top contenders including Joe Baksi, Jimmy Bivins, Lee Oma and Tommy Gómez. Despite closing out 1946 with losses to future light heavyweight champion Joey Maxim and a rematch with top ranked heavyweight contender Elmer Ray, he promptly avenged both of those defeats in 1947 and rose to the rank of #1 heavyweight contender.

=== Walcott vs Louis ===
Now the top contender, Walcott fought heavyweight champion Joe Louis on December 5, 1947. At 33 years of age Walcott broke the record as the oldest man to fight for the world heavyweight title, although he was only four months older than Louis at the time. At this point, Louis had been champion for over ten years and this would be his 24th title defense.

Walcott fought very well, dropping Louis in round one and again in round four, but lost a highly controversial 15-round split decision. Most boxing writers felt Walcott deserved the win; a debate ensued, and sportswriters carried the topic throughout America. The lone official to vote for Walcott, referee Ruby Goldstein, was cast as a hero. Letters and telegrams poured in to the Goldstein household, praising his judgment. There was talk of an investigation being assembled for rule revisions in judging. Louis went into seclusion for a couple of days, then quieted dissent with the following: "I know Ruby. He calls them as he sees them and that should be good enough for anybody."

What controversy remained was the kind that builds the gate, and Jersey Joe was rightfully granted a rematch on June 25, 1948. The heavily anticipated fight proved to also be competitive. Walcott dropped Louis once again, this time in the third round, but Louis went on to rally, and ultimately prevailed, scoring a knockout in round 11. The bout was Louis' record 25th and final title defense before announcing his first retirement. The rematch was also the world's first closed-circuit telecast (CCTV) sports broadcast, distributed via theatre television.

=== Walcott vs Charles ===
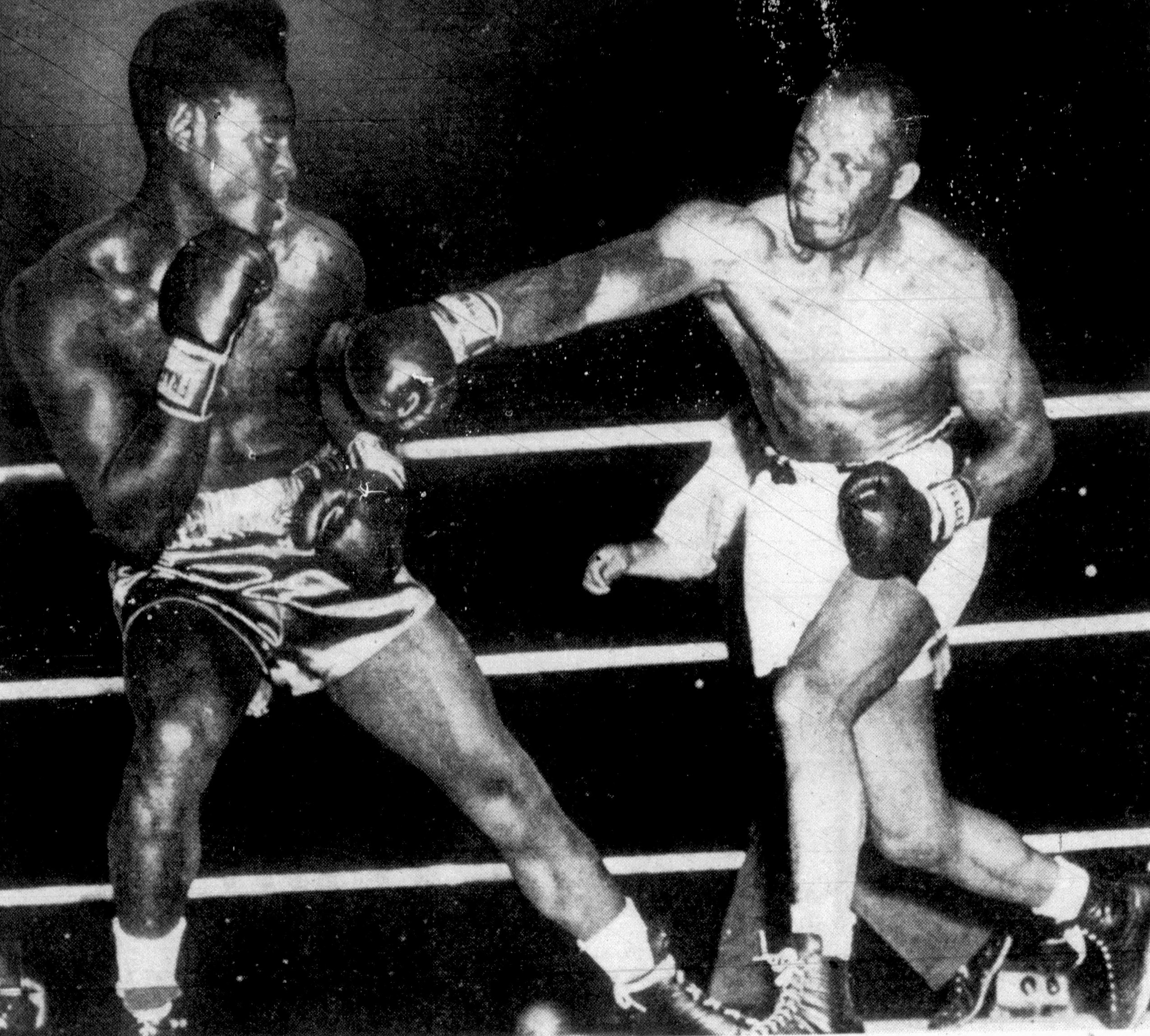
Ezzard Charles (left) dodges a right hand from Jersey Joe Walcott (right) during their first boxing match on June 22, 1949, at Comiskey Park in Chicago

On June 22, 1949, Walcott got another chance to become a world champion when he faced the highly skilled Ezzard Charles for the NBA heavyweight title left vacant by Louis. Charles prevailed, winning a unanimous decision over 15 rounds. Walcott, disappointed but eager to see his dream of being a champion come true, fought on, and in 1950 he won four of his five bouts, including a third-round knockout of future world light heavyweight champion Harold Johnson.

On March 7, 1951, he and Charles fought another title fight. Charles had defeated Louis the previous year, and was now the undisputed heavyweight champion. Walcott fought well, but was hurt in the ninth round when he was dropped by a sharp left hook. Walcott survived the round but once again Charles won a 15-round decision to retain his world title.

Despite losing four title shots, only four months later, Walcott joined a small handful of boxers who claimed the world title on their fifth try. Charles fought Walcott in another title fight on July 18, 1951, at Forbes Field in Pittsburgh. This time Walcott gave his best performance of their entire series of fights, winning most of the rounds and knocking out Charles in the seventh round, with a left hook to the jaw, to finally become world heavyweight champion at the age of 37. This made him the oldest boxer ever to win the world heavyweight crown, a distinction he would hold until George Foreman won the title at age 45 in 1994. Walcott retained his title in a fourth and final fight with his arch-rival Charles on June 5, 1952, this time winning a close 15-round decision. The Associated Press (AP) reported, "In the last round, [Charles] was bombing desperately with long right hands that slithered around Walcott's neck. Walcott's ability to spin, to make [Charles]'s punches miss, and counter with those damaging hooks, apparently won him the nod on two ballots. Judges McTieman and Tomasco gave that round to Walcott to win their close decision".

=== Walcott vs Marciano ===
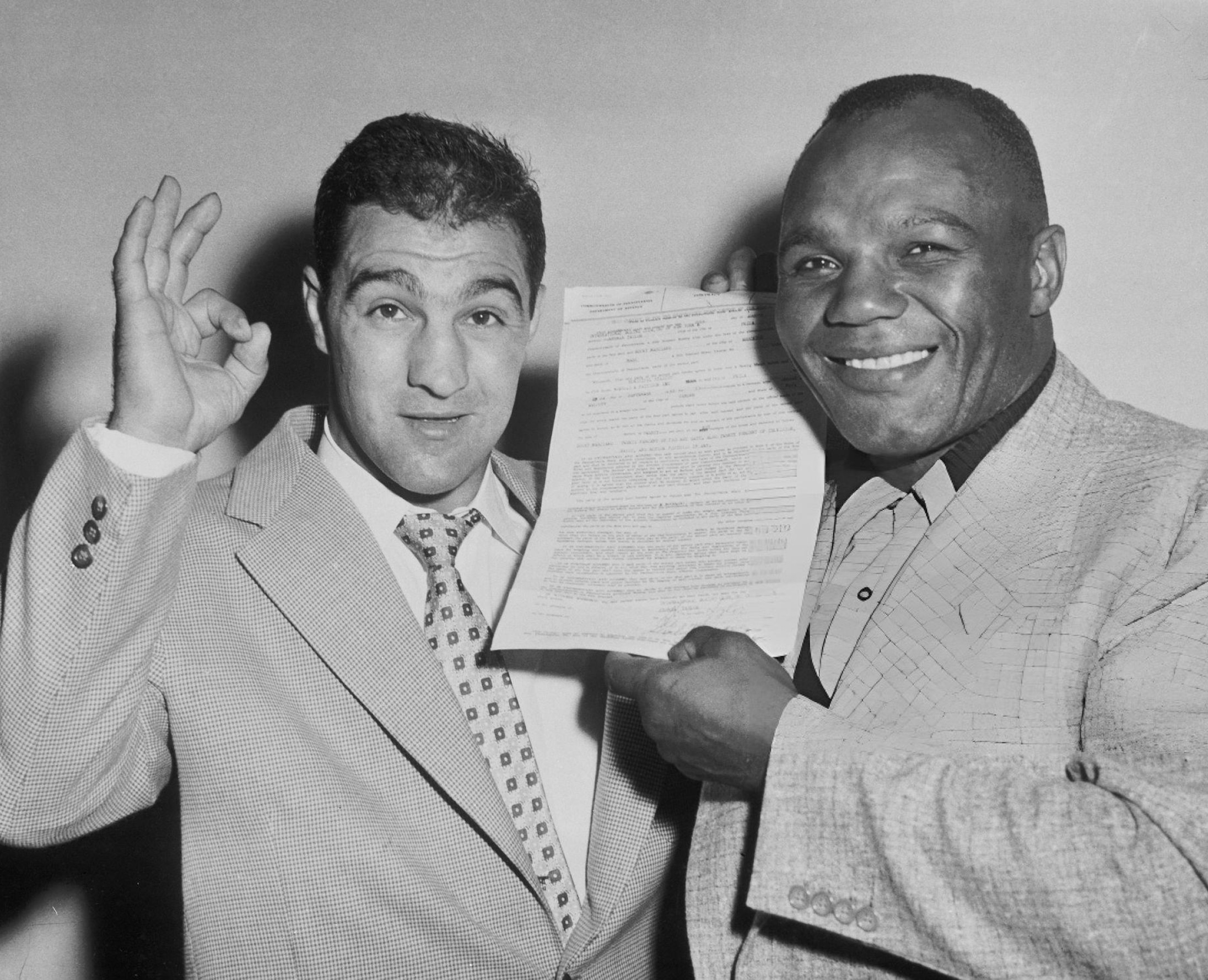
Rocky Marciano (left) and Walcott (right) pose with their signed contract to fight for the heavyweight title, c. August 1952

On September 23, 1952, at Municipal Stadium in Philadelphia, Walcott put his title on the line for the second time, and this time his opponent was the undefeated Rocky Marciano. In the first round, Walcott floored Marciano with a left hook; the first time in his career that Rocky had ever been down. After twelve intense rounds, Walcott stood well ahead on two of the three official scorecards, leaving Marciano needing a knockout to win. In the thirteenth round, with Marciano pressuring Walcott against the ropes, simultaneously each threw a right hand. Marciano landed first and flush on Walcott's jaw with a devastating right hook and a powerful left follow-up. The title changed hands in an instant. Walcott collapsed with his left arm hanging over the ropes, slowly sinking to the canvas, where he was counted out. An immediate rematch was set for May 15, 1953, at Chicago Stadium. The second time around Walcott was again defeated by Marciano by a knockout, this time in the first round. It would be Walcott's last bout.

== Fighting style ==
Walcott was known for his defense including his head movement, such as slipping, to avoid being hit. Jersey Joe was especially well known for his use of the shoulder roll. James Toney credits Walcott as the inspiration for his variation of the shoulder roll.

Jersey Joe was also known for his unique footwork such as his "Walcott Shuffle" which involved quickly switching from an orthodox lead to a southpaw lead, and vice versa, to distract his opponents and create angles. This became the inspiration for Muhammad Ali to create the "Ali Shuffle" used for the same purpose.

== Life after boxing ==
=== Acting career ===
Walcott did not go away from the celebrity scene after boxing. In 1956, he co-starred with Humphrey Bogart and Max Baer in the boxing drama The Harder They Fall.

=== Professional Wrestling career ===
He went into professional wrestling in 1956 in New Mexico. In 1963, he lost to Lou Thesz in a boxer vs. wrestler match in Memphis, Tennessee. Thesz pinned Walcott in the fourth round, but has stated that Walcott knocked him (Thesz) down and most likely out in that third round. As he fell to the floor, he relied on instinct, grabbing Walcott's knees, taking him down with him, and stretching him out for the pin. He lost to Thesz again in Florida in 1966. He continued wrestling until 1969.

=== Refereeing ===
Walcott also refereed several notable fights, but in 1965 he oversaw the controversial world heavyweight championship rematch between Muhammad Ali and Sonny Liston. Walcott lost the count as Ali circled around a floored Liston and Walcott tried to get him back to a neutral corner. Walcott then looked outside of the ring (presumably to the ringside count keeper) as Ali and Liston went at each other, before Walcott instructed them to keep on fighting. Walcott then approached the fighters and abruptly stopped the fight. This incident effectively ended his career as a referee, although he eventually returned to officiate two more fights in the late 1970s.

=== Political career ===
After retiring, Walcott worked for the Camden County corrections department. In 1968, he ran for Sheriff of Camden County, New Jersey, but lost in the Democratic primary to Spencer H. Smith Jr. That same year he was named director of community relations for Camden.

In 1971, he ran again for Camden County Sheriff. He defeated Republican William Strang in the general election. He was the first African-American to serve as Sheriff in Camden County.

He served as chairman of the New Jersey State Athletic Commission from 1975 until 1984, when he stepped down at the mandatory retirement age of 70. Walcott was inducted into the International Boxing Hall of Fame in Canastota, New York.

== Death ==
Walcott died from diabetes-related complications on February 25, 1994, at the age of 80.

== Honors ==
In 2013, Walcott was inducted into the New Jersey Hall of Fame.

== Partial filmography ==
- The Harder They Fall (1956) - George
- The Super Fight (1970) - Himself (voice)

== Professional boxing record ==
70 fights	49 wins	20 losses
By knockout	31	6
By decision	17	13
By disqualification	1	1
Draws	1	

No.	Result	Record	Opponent	Type	Round(s), time	Date	Location	Notes
70	Loss	49–20–1	Rocky Marciano	KO	1 (15), 2:25	May 15, 1953	Chicago Stadium, Chicago, Illinois, U.S.	For NYSAC, NBA, and The Ring heavyweight title
69	Loss	49–19–1	Rocky Marciano	KO	13 (15), 0:43	Sep 23, 1952	Municipal Stadium, Philadelphia, Pennsylvania, U.S.	Lost NYSAC, NBA, and The Ring heavyweight title
68	Win	49–18–1	Ezzard Charles	UD	15	Jun 5, 1952	Municipal Stadium, Philadelphia, Pennsylvania, U.S.	Retained NYSAC, NBA, and The Ring heavyweight title
67	Win	48–18–1	Ezzard Charles	KO	7 (15), 0:55	Jul 18, 1951	Forbes Field, Pittsburgh, Pennsylvania, U.S.	Won NYSAC, NBA, and The Ring heavyweight titles
66	Loss	47–18–1	Ezzard Charles	UD	15	Mar 7, 1951	Olympia, Detroit, Michigan, U.S.	For NYSAC, NBA, and The Ring heavyweight titles
65	Loss	47–17–1	Rex Layne	UD	10	Nov 24, 1950	Madison Square Garden, New York City, New York, U.S.	
64	Win	47–16–1	Hein ten Hoff	UD	10	May 28, 1950	Rhein-Neckar-Stadion, Mannheim, West Germany	
63	Win	46–16–1	Johnny Shkor	KO	1 (10), 1:34	Mar 13, 1950	Philadelphia Arena, Philadelphia, Pennsylvania, U.S.	
62	Win	45–16–1	Omelio Agramonte	TKO	7 (10), 2:11	Mar 3, 1950	Madison Square Garden, New York City, New York, U.S.	
61	Win	44–16–1	Harold Johnson	KO	3 (10), 1:03	Feb 8, 1950	Philadelphia Arena, Philadelphia, Pennsylvania, U.S.	
60	Win	43–16–1	Olle Tandberg	TKO	5 (12), 2:30	Aug 14, 1949	Råsunda Stadium, Stockholm, Sweden	
59	Loss	42–16–1	Ezzard Charles	UD	15	Jun 22, 1949	Comiskey Park, Chicago, Illinois, U.S.	For vacant NBA heavyweight title
58	Loss	42–15–1	Joe Louis	KO	11 (15)	Jun 25, 1948	Yankee Stadium, New York City, New York, U.S.	For NYSAC, NBA, The Ring heavyweight titles
57	Loss	42–14–1	Joe Louis	SD	15	Dec 5, 1947	Madison Square Garden, New York City, New York, U.S.	For NYSAC, NBA, and The Ring heavyweight titles
56	Win	42–13–1	Joey Maxim	SD	10	Jun 23, 1947	Gilmore Field, Los Angeles, California, U.S.	
55	Win	41–13–1	Elmer Ray	MD	10	Mar 4, 1947	Burdine Stadium, Miami, Florida, U.S.	
54	Win	40–13–1	Joey Maxim	MD	10	Jan 6, 1947	Convention Hall, Philadelphia, Pennsylvania, U.S.	
53	Loss	39–13–1	Elmer Ray	SD	10	Nov 15, 1946	Madison Square Garden, New York City, New York, U.S.	
52	Loss	39–12–1	Joey Maxim	PTS	10	Aug 28, 1946	Public Service Ballpark, Camden, New Jersey, U.S.	
51	Win	39–11–1	Tommy Gómez	TKO	3 (10), 1:21	Aug 16, 1946	Madison Square Garden, New York City, New York, U.S.	
50	Win	38–11–1	Lee Oma	UD	10	May 24, 1946	Madison Square Garden, New York City, New York, U.S.	
49	Win	37–11–1	Al Blake	TKO	4 (10), 2:17	Mar 20, 1946	Convention Hall, Camden, New Jersey, U.S.	
48	Win	36–11–1	Jimmy Bivins	SD	10	Feb 25, 1946	Cleveland Arena, Cleveland, Ohio, U.S.	
47	Win	35–11–1	Johnny Allen	KO	3 (12), 0:30	Jan 30, 1946	Convention Hall, Camden, New Jersey, U.S.	
46	Win	34–11–1	Curtis Sheppard	KO	10 (10), 2:12	Dec 10, 1945	Coliseum, Baltimore, Maryland, U.S.	
45	Win	33–11–1	Lee Q. Murray	DQ	9 (10)	Nov 12, 1945	Coliseum, Baltimore, Maryland, U.S.	Murray DQ'd for "not trying"
44	Win	32–11–1	Steve Dudas	TKO	5 (10), 1:50	Oct 24, 1945	Paterson, New Jersey, U.S.	
43	Win	31–11–1	Johnny Denson	KO	2 (10), 1:06	Sep 20, 1945	Convention Hall, Camden, New Jersey, U.S.	
42	Win	30–11–1	Joe Baksi	PTS	10	Aug 2, 1945	Convention Hall, Camden, New Jersey, U.S.	
41	Win	29–11–1	Johnny Allen	PTS	8	Mar 15, 1945	Convention Hall, Camden, New Jersey, U.S.	
40	Win	28–11–1	Austin Johnson	PTS	6	Feb 22, 1945	Convention Hall, Camden, New Jersey, U.S.	
39	Loss	27–11–1	Johnny Allen	PTS	8	Jan 25, 1945	Convention Hall, Camden, New Jersey, U.S.	
38	Win	27–10–1	Jackie Saunders	TKO	2 (6), 2:42	Jan 11, 1945	Convention Hall, Camden, New Jersey, U.S.	
37	Win	26–10–1	Ellis Singleton	KO	3 (8), 0:58	Jun 28, 1944	Batesville AC, Haddonfield, New Jersey, U.S.	
36	Win	25–10–1	Felix Del Paoli	PTS	8	Jun 7, 1944	Batesville AC, Haddonfield, New Jersey, U.S.	
35	Loss	24–10–1	Abe Simon	KO	6 (8), 2:32	Feb 12, 1940	Laurel Garden, Newark, New Jersey, U.S.	
34	Win	24–9–1	Tiger 'Red' Lewis	TKO	6 (10), 2:28	Jan 19, 1940	Cambria AC, Philadelphia, Pennsylvania, U.S.	
33	Win	23–9–1	Curtis Sheppard	PTS	8	Nov 18, 1939	Rockland Palace, New York City, New York, U.S.	
32	Win	22–9–1	Al Boros	PTS	8	Aug 14, 1939	Meadowbrook Bowl, Newark, New Jersey, U.S.	
31	Win	21–9–1	Bob Tow	PTS	8	Dec 23, 1938	114th Infantry Regiment Armory, Camden, New Jersey, U.S.	
30	Loss	20–9–1	Roy Lazer	PTS	8	Jun 14, 1938	Fairview Arena, Camden, New Jersey, U.S.	
29	Loss	20–8–1	Tiger Jack Fox	PTS	10	May 10, 1938	Convention Hall, Camden, New Jersey, U.S.	
28	Win	20–7–1	Lorenzo Pack	KO	4 (8), 2:44	Apr 12, 1938	Convention Hall, Camden, New Jersey, U.S.	
27	Win	19–7–1	Art Sykes	KO	4 (8), 2:07	Mar 25, 1938	Cambria A.C., Philadelphia, Pennsylvania, U.S.	
26	Win	18–7–1	Jim Whitest	PTS	8	Jan 20, 1938	Olympia A.C., Philadelphia, Pennsylvania, U.S.	
25	Win	17–7–1	Freddie Fiducia	PTS	8	Jan 10, 1938	Philadelphia Arena, Philadelphia, Pennsylvania, U.S.	
24	Loss	16–7–1	George Brothers	PTS	8	Oct 9, 1937	Rockland Palace, New York City, New York, U.S.	
23	Win	16–6–1	Elmer Ray	KO	3 (6), 0:43	Sep 25, 1937	Rockland Palace, New York City, New York, U.S.	
22	Win	15–6–1	Joe Lipps	KO	2 (8)	Sep 3, 1937	Garden Pier, Atlantic City, New Jersey, U.S.	
21	Loss	14–6–1	Tiger Jack Fox	KO	8 (10), 2:24	May 22, 1937	Rockland Palace, New York City, New York, U.S.	
20	Loss	14–5–1	Billy Ketchell	PTS	10	Sep 1, 1936	Arena, Pennsauken, New Jersey	
19	Draw	14–4–1	Billy Ketchell	PTS	10	Jul 14, 1936	Arena, Pennsauken, New Jersey, U.S.	
18	Win	14–4	Phil Johnson	TKO	3 (6), 1:12	Jun 22, 1936	Shibe Park, Philadelphia, Pennsylvania, U.S.	
17	Win	13–4	Louis LePage	KO	3 (6), 1:06	Jun 16, 1936	Coney Island Velodrome, New York City, New York, U.S.	
16	Win	12–4	Joe Colucci	KO	4 (10), 0:45	Apr 28, 1936	Convention Hall, Camden, New Jersey, U.S.	
15	Win	11–4	Willie Reddish	PTS	8	Mar 16, 1936	Philadelphia Arena, Philadelphia, Pennsylvania, U.S.	
14	Loss	10–4	Al Ettore	KO	8 (10), 1:18	Jan 21, 1936	Convention Hall, Camden, New Jersey, U.S.	
13	Win	10–3	Roxie Allen	KO	8 (8), 1:06	Nov 26, 1935	Convention Hall, Camden, New Jersey, U.S.	
12	Win	9–3	Al King	KO	1 (8), 1:21	Oct 29, 1935	Convention Hall, Camden, New Jersey, U.S.	
11	Win	8–3	Pat Roland	TKO	4 (8), 2:31	Oct 1, 1935	Convention Hall, Camden, New Jersey, U.S.	
10	Win	7–3	Lew Alva	KO	1 (8), 1:01	Aug 26, 1935	Arena, Pennsauken, New Jersey, U.S.	
9	Loss	6–3	Henry Taylor	PTS	6	Nov 16, 1933	New Broadway AC, Philadelphia, Pennsylvania, U.S.	
8	Win	6–2	Henry Taylor	KO	1 (6), 1:16	Jul 28, 1933	Arena, Pennsauken, New Jersey, U.S.	
7	Win	5–2	Bob Norris	KO	1 (6)	May 5, 1933	Camden, New Jersey, U.S.	Exact date unknown
6	Win	4–2	Carl Mays	KO	2 (6)	Apr 20, 1931	Waltz Dream Arena, Atlantic City, New Jersey, U.S.	
5	Loss	3–2	Carl Mays	PTS	6	Mar 19, 1931	Egg Harbor, New Jersey, U.S.	
4	Win	3–1	Frank Mitchell	TKO	4 (6)	Oct 24, 1930	Convention Hall, Camden, New Jersey, U.S.	
3	Win	2–1	Jimmy O'Toole	TKO	4 (6)	Oct 10, 1930	Convention Hall, Camden, New Jersey, U.S.	
2	Loss	1–1	K.O. Palmer	DQ	3 (6)	Sep 16, 1930	Ice Arena, Vineland, New Jersey, U.S.	Walcott dominated the fight but fouled Palmer when draped over the ropes
1	Win	1–0	Eddie Wallace	KO	1 (6)	Sep 9, 1930	Ice Arena, Vineland, New Jersey, U.S.	

== Titles in boxing ==
=== Major world titles ===
- NYSAC heavyweight champion (200+ lbs)
- NBA (WBA) heavyweight champion (200+ lbs)

=== The Ring magazine titles ===
- The Ring heavyweight champion (200+ lbs)

=== Undisputed titles ===
- Undisputed heavyweight champion

== See also ==
- List of heavyweight boxing champions

Sporting positions
World boxing titles
Preceded by Ezzard Charles	NYSAC heavyweight champion July 18, 1951 – September 23, 1952	Succeeded by Rocky Marciano
Preceded by Ezzard Charles	NBA heavyweight champion July 18, 1951 – September 23, 1952	Succeeded by Rocky Marciano
Preceded by Ezzard Charles	The Ring heavyweight champion July 18, 1951 – September 23, 1952	Succeeded by Rocky Marciano
Preceded by Ezzard Charles	Undisputed heavyweight champion July 18, 1951 – September 23, 1952	Succeeded by Rocky Marciano
Records
Previous: Jess Willard	Oldest world heavyweight champion July 18, 1951 – November 5, 1994	Next: George Foreman
