= 1969 Newton Cessna 172 crash =

Aviation accident which killed boxer Rocky Marciano

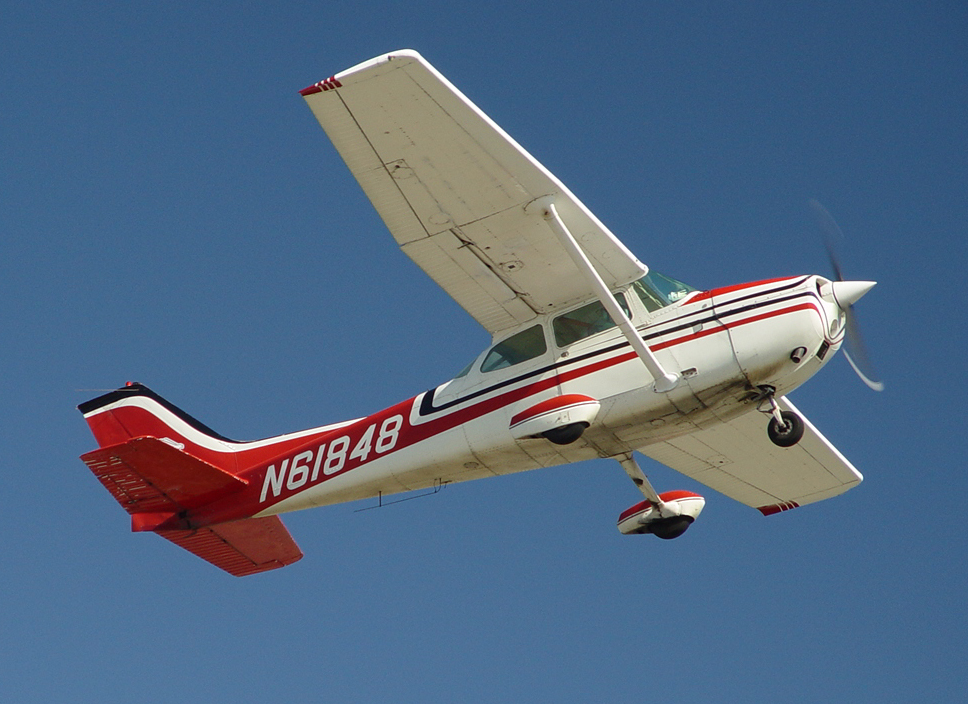
- A Cessna 172 similar to the accident aircraft

Accident
- Date: August 31, 1969 at 8:05 pm
- Summary: VFR flight into adverse weather.
- Site: Jasper County, Iowa, United States; 41.707°N 93.076°W

Aircraft
- Aircraft type: Cessna 172
- Call sign: NOVEMBER 3149 X-RAY
- Registration: N3149X
- Flight origin: Midway Airport
- Destination: Des Moines, Iowa
- Passengers: 2
- Crew: 1
- Fatalities: 3
- Survivors: 0

On August 31, 1969, a Cessna 172 crashed in Newton, Iowa, killing former world heavyweight champion boxer Rocky Marciano and two others.

== The flight ==
On Sunday, August 31, 1969 at 8:05 pm CDT, the Cessna 172 with registration number N3149X crashed in a pasture near Newton, Iowa, approximately thirty miles (50 km) east of Des Moines.

It had departed from Chicago Midway Airport at 6 pm (1800 hrs) and was en route to Des Moines, where Marciano was to celebrate his 46th birthday at a party the next day. This was to be a surprise party for him; he was to give a speech in support of his friend, Louis Fratto's son. Marciano intended to later fly to Florida to celebrate his birthday at home with his family.

== Accident ==
A storm system was building in the Des Moines region at the time of the accident. The airplane's pilot was 37-year-old Glenn Belz, who was not experienced with night flying or flying during bad weather. Belz decided to head to Newton instead of continuing to Des Moines as planned, to avoid the bad weather. While trying to land at Newton the aircraft entered a low cloud, attempted an overshoot and the pilot lost control, impacting a lone oak tree in a pasture. The airplane was also short of fuel at the time of the crash.

Witness Coleen Swarts observed the airplane reverse its course and then heard a loud sound as it crashed.
